= Medlow Bath railway station =

Railway station in New South Wales, Australia

Medlow Bath
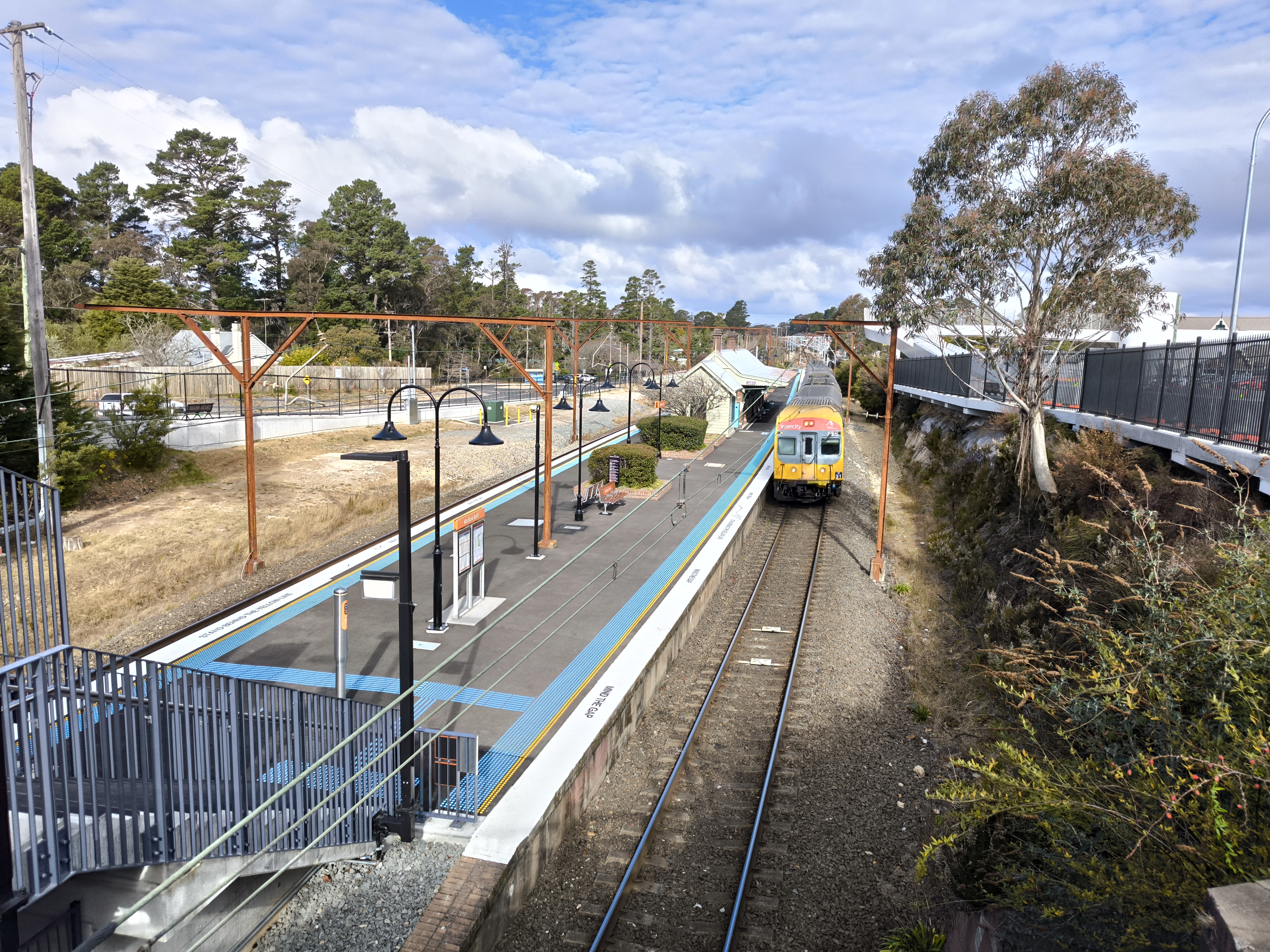
- Eastbound view from the footbridge, July 2025

General information
- Location: Great Western Highway, Medlow Bath; Australia
- Coordinates: 33°40′25″S 150°16′50″E
- Elevation: 1,059 metres (3,474 ft)
- Owner: Transport Asset Manager of New South Wales
- Operator: Sydney Trains
- Line: Main Western
- Distance: 115.80 km (71.95 mi) from Central
- Platforms: 2 (1 island)
- Tracks: 2
- Connections: Bus

Construction
- Structure type: Ground

Other information
- Station code: MED
- Website: Transport for NSW

History
- Opened: 21 January 1880
- Former names: Browns Siding Pulpit Hill (1880–1883); Medlow (1883–1903)

Passengers
- 2025: 19,364 (year); 53 (daily) (Sydney Trains, NSW TrainLink)

Services
Preceding station	Intercity Trains	Following station
Blackheath towards Lithgow	Blue Mountains Line	Katoomba towards Central

New South Wales Heritage Register
- Official name: Medlow Bath Railway Station group
- Type: State heritage (complex / group)
- Designated: 2 April 1999
- Reference no.: 1190
- Type: Railway Platform / Station
- Category: Transport – Rail
Location

Medlow Bath railway station is a heritage-listed railway station located on the Main Western line in Medlow Bath in the City of Blue Mountains local government area of New South Wales, Australia. It was designed by NSW Government Railways and built from 1902 to 1922. The property was added to the New South Wales State Heritage Register on 2 April 1999.

== History ==
The single track main line from Katoomba to Blackheath was opened in 1868. A halt stop was established at Medlow Bath in 1880. Upon opening, it was named Browns Siding Pulpit Hill, because of Brown's pioneering sawmill close by on Railway Parade. The station was renamed Medlow on 1 March 1883 and Medlow Bath on 1 October 1903 with the opening of Mark Foy's Hydro.

The 1881 platform was 30 metres (100 feet) long and was situated on the down side of the single line where the present station is located. Additions to the station buildings were made in 1899, but duplication of the line in 1902 prompted the replacement of the original platform by the present island platform. The existing buildings date from that time and like most stations between Emu Plains and Lithgow, Medlow Bath received a standard Federation style brick building.

Also on the platform is a small timber signal box. An open interlocking frame was erected on the platform in 1909 but evidence suggests that the frame was not covered by the existing structure until c. 1922. It was taken out of service in 1957 but continued to be used as a store. It is now a rare example of a separate platform level signal box.

An additional siding was built in 1926 and in 1942 the platform was extended at the Sydney end.

The gatekeepers cottage is now privately owned.

== Platforms and services ==
Medlow Bath has one island platform with two sides. It is serviced by Sydney Trains Blue Mountains Line services travelling from Sydney Central to Lithgow.

Platform	Line	Stopping pattern	Notes
1	Blue Mountains Line	services to Sydney Central	
2	Blue Mountains Line	services to Mount Victoria & Lithgow	

== Description ==
The complex comprises a type 11, island station building "A8" design, brick, completed in 1902; and a gabled roof, timber signal room, completed in c. 1922. Other structures include a brick faced island platform, completed in 1902; and a footbridge, completed in 1901 and 1994.

=== Station building (1902) ===
Constructed of face brick with corrugated metal gabled roof extending as an awning to both platforms, the Medlow Bath station building is an early phase island building in standard "A8" Federation style design. It features 6 bays with linear arrangement along the platform with tuckpointed red brickwork with engaged piers between the bays. Other features include rendered and moulded two rows of string courses, moulded cornice, timber framed windows and doors with contrasting decorative trims and sills, standard iron brackets over decorative corbels supporting ample platform awnings, fretted timber work to both ends of awnings and gable ends, timber finials to gable apex, tall corbelled chimneys, timber framed double-hung windows with multi-paned and coloured upper sashes, and timber door openings with multi-paned fanlights with coloured glazing.

Medlow Bath Station is an unattended station and its interiors are in an abandoned state. The floor layout of the building comprises a booking office, waiting room, ladies waiting and toilets and male toilets with access from the south end of the building. The interiors generally feature custom orb ceilings with ceiling roses, fireplaces with no grates, timber floor boards to main rooms and tiling to toilets, beaded dado line and timber bead style moulded cornices. Toilet fittings are modern.

=== Signal room (c. 1922) ===
A small timber building at the booking office end of the station on axis with the platform. Historical evidence suggest that this weatherboard building covered an interlocking frame, which was originally erected as an open frame. It appears to be used as a store room after being taken out of service in 1957. It has a steep gabled corrugated metal roof, rusticated timber boarding with small four-paned windows on three elevations, and a four-panelled timber door with timber awning on the south elevation.

=== Island platform (1902) ===
A typical island platform running north–south, with the buildings located approximately at the centre. The platform is brick faced with a concrete deck and asphalt finish. Two raised round shaped slabs are located to the south of the station building probably for access to the services below the platform. A number of garden beds along the axis of the platform enhance the setting of the station. Modern platform furniture including light fittings, signage, timber bench seating and aluminium palisade fencing at both ends of the platform are other features along the platform.

=== Footbridge (1901, 1994) ===
A standard concrete slab structure supported on original brick abutments and two steel trestles with new stairs to the platform and bridge with new concrete deck over the tracks spanning between the Great Western Highway and Railway Parade. The footbridge marks the northern end of the station. A concrete level crossing with relatively new fabric is also located on the southern end of the station. 1994 metal balustrades provides safety along the edges of the stairs and the bridge.

=== Moveable items ===
Two timber bench style seats in the waiting room.

=== Condition ===
As of 3 December 2008, the condition was assessed as follows:

- Station Building – Good externally, however; internally it is in poor condition.
- Signal Room – Good externally, internal condition unknown
- Island Platform – Very Good
- Footbridge – Very Good

The station building has a high degree of integrity externally, however; the interiors have lost their intactness due to the poor condition. The timber signal room is intact. The footbridge is relatively intact as it retains its original steel superstructure.

=== Modifications and dates ===
- c. 1922 – 1909 interlocking frame covered by timber Signal box
- 1926 – additional siding built
- 1942 – platform extended at the Sydney end
- 1957 – line electrified
- 1994 – footbridge upgraded with new deck, stepway, and the superstructure cleaned and repainted.

== Transport links ==
Blue Mountains Transit operates two bus routes via Medlow Bath station, under contract to Transport for NSW:

- 698: Katoomba to Blackheath
- 698V: Katoomba to Mount Victoria

== Gallery ==
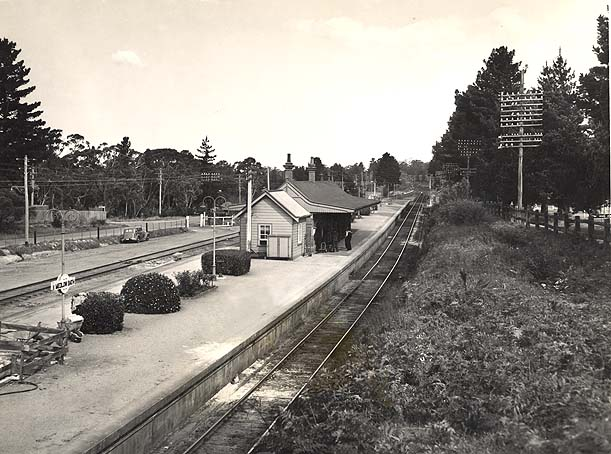
Eastbound view in December 1954

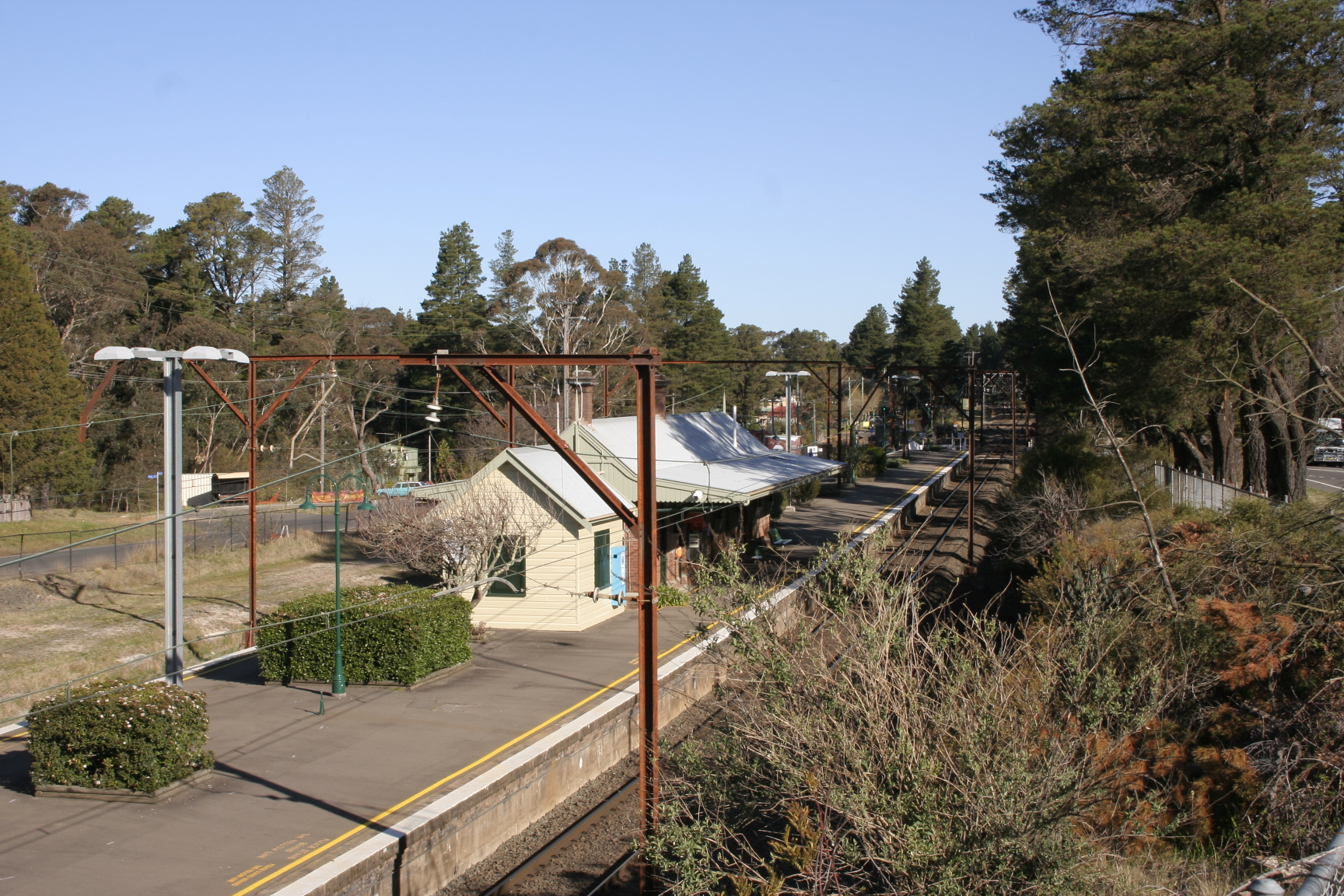
Eastbound view in September 2007

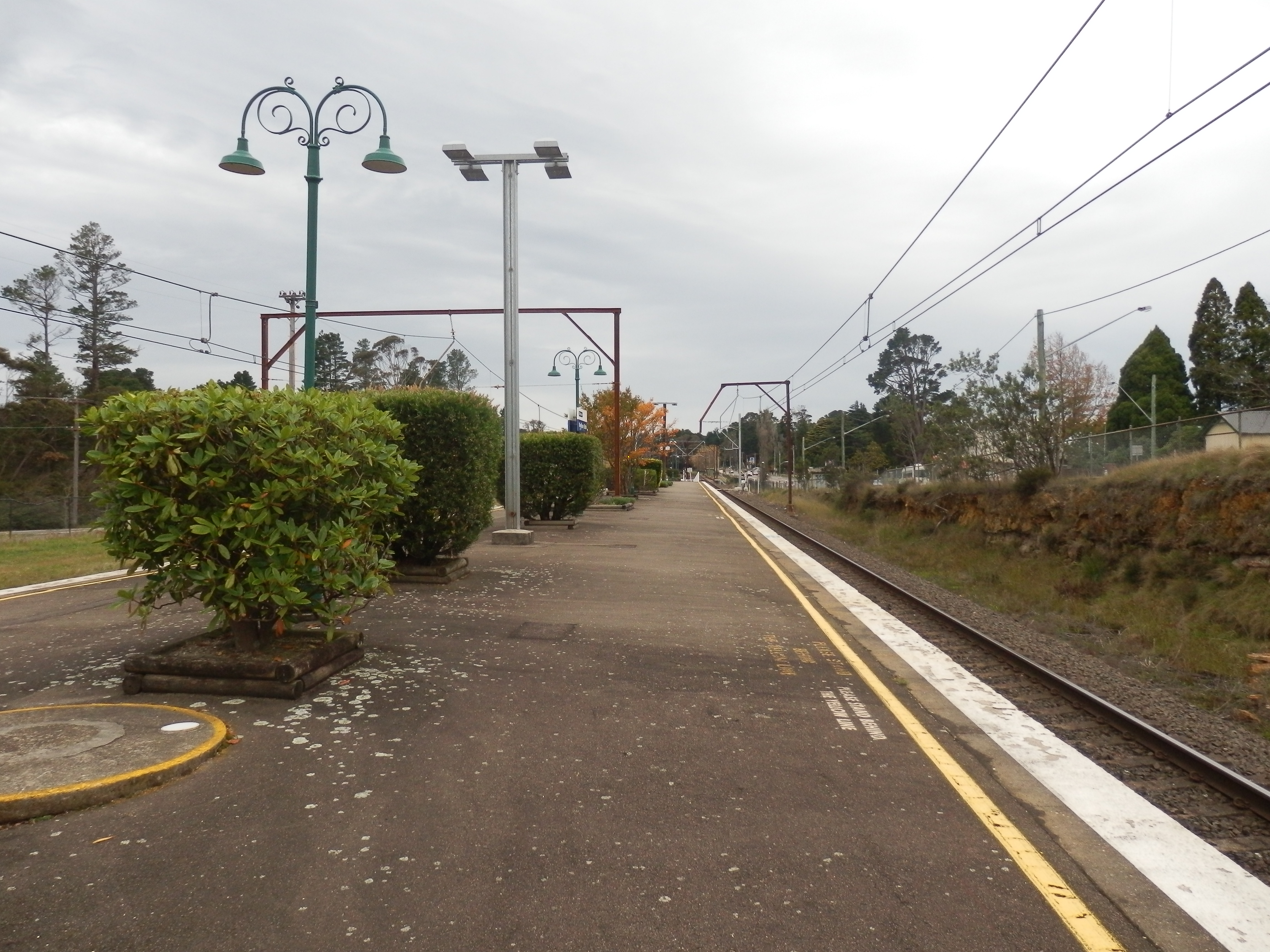
Eastbound view from platform 2, April 2012

== Heritage listing ==
As at 15 April 2013, Medlow Bath Railway Station is significant as part of the early construction phase of railway line duplication on the upper Blue Mountains demonstrating the technological and engineering achievements in railway construction at the beginning of the 1900s. Constructed in anticipation of a boom period in the mountains particularly in connection with large holiday resorts such as the Hydro-Majestic Hotel, Medlow Bath station building is a good example of a Federation free classical railway station. The station building demonstrates typical architectural elements of the standard Federation style island platform buildings that were built between Penrith and Lithgow when the line was duplicated.

Medlow Bath railway station was listed on the New South Wales State Heritage Register on 2 April 1999 having satisfied the following criteria.

The place is important in demonstrating the course, or pattern, of cultural or natural history in New South Wales.

Medlow Bath Station Group is of historical significance as part of the early construction phase of railway line duplication on the upper Blue Mountains demonstrating the technological and engineering achievements in railway construction at the beginning of the 1900s. It was built in anticipation of a boom period in the mountains, particularly in connection with large holiday resorts such as the nearby Hydro-Majestic Hotel.

The place is important in demonstrating aesthetic characteristics and/or a high degree of creative or technical achievement in New South Wales.

Medlow Bath station building is a good example of a standard design island platform building and demonstrates typical architectural elements of Federation period standard buildings that were built between Penrith and Lithgow following the duplication of the railway line. It maintains its overall architectural quality and setting.

The place has strong or special association with a particular community or cultural group in New South Wales for social, cultural or spiritual reasons.

The place has the potential to contribute to the local community's sense of place, and can provide a connection to the local community's past.

The place possesses uncommon, rare or endangered aspects of the cultural or natural history of New South Wales.

The timber signal room is a rare example of a separate platform level signal box as the majority of the signal rooms along Blue Mountains Line are incorporated into the main station building.

The place is important in demonstrating the principal characteristics of a class of cultural or natural places/environments in New South Wales.

The station building is one of the early examples of a large number of standard railway designs that were commonly used in the 1910s-20s after a decade from the construction of Medlow Bath station building. The 1901 superstructure of the footbridge is a typical example of standard steel beam structure supported on trestles and brick abutments with later concrete deck and steps.

== See also ==
- List of railway stations in New South Wales
