= Blackheath railway station, New South Wales =

Railway station in New South Wales, Australia

Blackheath
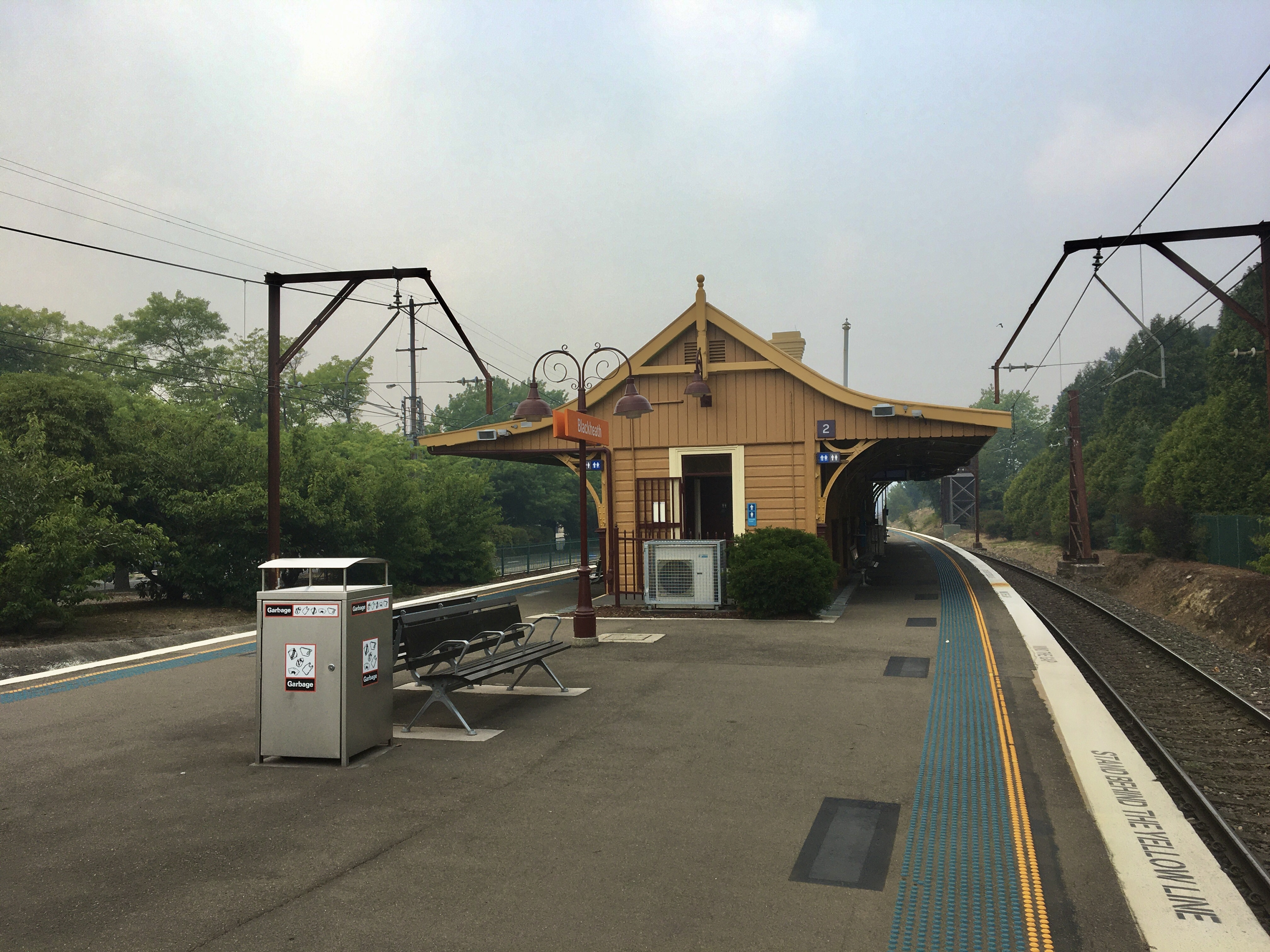
- Southbound view from the platform 2 side of the island platform, in December 2019. The clouds obscuring the sky are bushfire smoke from the Gospers Mountain fire.

General information
- Location: Railway Parade, Blackheath; Australia
- Coordinates: 33°38′00″S 150°17′04″E
- Elevation: 1,065 metres (3,494 ft)
- Owner: Transport Asset Manager of New South Wales
- Operator: Sydney Trains
- Line: Main Western
- Distance: 120.72 km (75.01 mi) from Central
- Platforms: 2 (1 island)
- Tracks: 2
- Connections: Bus; Coach; School Bus

Construction
- Structure type: Ground
- Accessible: Yes

Other information
- Status: Weekdays: Staffed: 5am to 4.30pm: Weekends and public holidays: Unstaffed
- Station code: BKE
- Website: Transport for NSW

History
- Opened: 28 December 1869

Passengers
- 2025: 127,329 (year); 349 (daily) (Sydney Trains, NSW TrainLink)

Services
Preceding station	Intercity Trains	Following station
Mount Victoria towards Lithgow	Blue Mountains Line	Medlow Bath towards Central

New South Wales Heritage Register
- Official name: Blackheath Railway Station Group
- Type: State heritage (built)
- Designated: 2 April 1999
- Reference no.: 1088
- Type: Railway Platform / Station
- Category: Transport – Rail
- Builders: NSW Government Railways
Location

Blackheath railway station is a heritage-listed former railway bridge and now railway station located on the Main Western line in Blackheath in the City of Blue Mountains local government area of New South Wales, Australia. It was designed and built by NSW Government Railways and built from 1897 to 1985. It is also known as the Blackheath Railway Station Group. The property was added to the New South Wales State Heritage Register on 2 April 1999. The station opened on 28 December 1869.

== History ==
The contract for extending the railway from Lawson to Blackheath was awarded in 1863 to W. Watkins, who completed the track a year ahead of schedule in 1866, although the ballasting of the line by a separate contractor took longer. Blackheath was to be the temporary terminus because of its level site and good water supply, but before the station was finished the destruction of the road bridge over the Nepean River at Emu Plains in the flood of 1867 prompted John Whitton, in charge of railways, to open the line as far as Wentworth Falls to assist stranded travellers to the west. Wentworth Falls, therefore, was for a short time the terminus. In the meantime, Watkins had won the contract to extend the line from Blackheath to Mount Victoria and the completion of this stretch in May 1868 led to Wentworth Falls being replaced by Mount Victoria, not by Blackheath, as the temporary terminus of the Western line. Plans to build a two-storied station at Blackheath were abandoned and this grander building was erected instead at Mount Victoria.

Blackheath station opened in 1868 as a "halt" and as a platform in 1869. The Great Western Railway was intended to initially reach Bathurst but, beyond that town, its terminus was not stated. The line was duplicated between Blackheath and Mount Victoria in 1898 and the present platform building was erected on an island platform to serve both lines at that time. A signal frame was provided at the Sydney end of the building and would appear to have been open-air, later enclosed. When duplication extended from Medlow Bath to Blackheath in 1902, a new platform building was not provided.

The Footbridge at Blackheath Station that provides access to the platforms was built in 1911. Its twin beam construction is typical of NSWGR practice. Since 1990, every component of the bridge, except the steel structure, has been replaced.

Then Chief Executive, David Hill, authorised in 1985 the reconstruction of the 1897 building when fire virtually destroyed much of the platform building. The Blackheath reconstruction, together with the restoration of Mortuary station, marked the start of heritage management in the NSW railway organisation.

In June 2023, the station was upgraded, involving replacing the level crossing with lifts connecting the footbridge and platforms.

== Platforms and services ==
Blackheath has one island platform with two sides. It is serviced by Sydney Trains Blue Mountains Line services travelling from Sydney Central to Lithgow.

Platform	Line	Stopping pattern	Notes
1	Blue Mountains Line	services to Sydney Central	
2	Blue Mountains Line	services to Mount Victoria & Lithgow	

== Description ==
The complex comprises a type 11 station building, completed in 1898 and partially reconstructed 1985. Other structures in the complex include the brick-faced island platform, completed in 1898; and the steel-framed footbridge, completed in 1911 and partially replaced in 1990.

=== Station building ===
External: This station building is a rare example of a large (type 11) timber island platform building. It has eight bays with cantilevered bracketed awnings to each platform elevation. Verandah brackets are plain with standard circular bracing sitting on decorative timber supports. Detailing is generally restrained with rusticated weatherboard siding and V-jointed timber panelled gable ends. Doors and windows are panelled with decorative architraves and sills, similar in design to rendered details on brick buildings from the period. A corrugated iron roof with timber fretwork gables with decorative finials to flying gable ends is a distinctive feature of the building. Two brick chimneys with corbelled tops are extant.

Internal: The internal original layout of the building as well as a number of original finishes remain, however the Station Master's office together with the parcels office (at the Sydney end) have been reconstructed after the 1985 fire. The planning is linear with booking office, Station Master's office, parcels office (formerly enclosed signal box with no surviving equipment), ladies waiting and toilet and at the far end with access from the gable wall, the men's toilet. Original features include decorative moulded pressed metal ceiling to the general waiting room, double-hung sash windows with multi-paned upper sashes and coloured glazing, timber panelled doors with multi-paned fanlights, and chimney breasts. Later modifications included changes to all other room finishes including plasterboard ceilings with simple cornices, tile and carpet flooring and new toilet fittings.

=== Island platform ===
Blackheath Station has an island platform, completed in 1898, in slightly curved form, which is wide at the centre and narrow at both ends of the platforms. This form is typical of Blue Mountains stations dictated by the topography and the deviation of the railway line. The platform is brick faced with brick projecting edge at the top and asphalt finish to the concrete deck. Platform furniture including period light fittings, and modern signage, timber bench seating and aluminium palisade fencing at both ends of the platform are other features along the platform. A number of small garden beds with small plantings and shrubs are scattered along the northern end of the platform.

=== Footbridge ===
A modified standard steel beam bridge, erected in 1911, supported on steel trestles with bracing extending over the Up main tracks with stairs to the island platform and to both streets. With the exception of original steel structure all components of the bridge have been replaced since the 1990s. The footbridge has contemporary canopies and metal balustrades.

=== Landscape ===
Station gardens, mature trees and landscaped surrounds within property boundaries adjoining the Council landscaped gardens. The plantings on the platform are not considered significant.

=== Shops ===
266 Great Western Highway consists of a pair of similarly scaled and configured retail buildings. Both have gabled roofs that assume a broken backed form above verandahs that span the footpath on the eastern sides of the buildings. The external surface walls are of textured cement render and symmetrical facades are designed with central doors flanked by large display windows. The varandah roofs are supported off similarly detailed chamfered timber posts.

The roof of the northern building is covered with fibro slates and features terracotta cresting and rams horn finials along the ridge. The display windows on the eastern side of the building have architraves and sills of cement render, the sills being formed into decorative scrolls and the heads being wide and splayed at each end. The door is partially glazed and divided into a number of glazed and solid panels; both door and windows have highlights over. The window at the southern end of the building is set into an arched opening and has a multi paned highlight over the main sash. The word "Auctioneer" has been formed in the cement render lining the northern wall.

The roof of the southern building is covered with terracotta tiles. The architrave around the windows and door in the eastern facade are more simple in design than those of the northern building, while the building has windows in each end consisting of casement type sashes with highlights over.

=== Condition ===
As at 8 September 2008, the station building was in a good condition. Also in good condition were the platform and the footbridge.

=== Potential archaeological features ===
There are no known archaeological features. Although intact, the building has partially been reconstructed after the 1980s fire. Thus its integrity is moderate. Similarly, other than its steel beam structural elements the fabric of the footbridge has also been replaced in 1990 and has moderate integrity. The overall integrity of the station as a group is moderate.

=== Modifications and dates ===
- c. 1982: original timber platform building was severely burnt c. 1982 and approximately 40% of the structure that is extant today (at the Sydney end of the building) is new fabric.
- post 1990: footbridge upgraded with covered deck etc.

=== Further information ===
Also see separate listing for Blackheath Railway Station – Shops (266 Great Western Highway). The Relay Hut is not considered to be of significance and has been excluded from the listing. The nearby railway residence is in private ownership and is not part of this listing. Constructed in c. 1890s the Station Master's residence is a type 5 standard railway residence (officially known as the "J1" or 'K1'). It is of brick construction with two corrugated metal hipped roofs over the main structure and the projecting bay presenting an asymmetrical facade with a side verandah featuring hipped awning supported on turned timber posts. Fenestration includes narrow tall sash windows with segmental arch lintels.

== Transport links ==
Blue Mountains Transit operates two bus routes via Blackheath station, under contract to Transport for NSW:

- 698: to Katoomba
- 698V: Katoomba to Mount Victoria

== Heritage listing ==
As of 22 February 2012, Blackheath Railway Station is of state significance as part of the early construction phase of railway line duplication on the upper Blue Mountains, demonstrating the technological and engineering achievements in railway construction at the end of the 19th century. The building is significant for its contribution to the scenic qualities of the Blue Mountains railway landscape, forming part of a cohesive group of intact stations along the line. The platform building at Blackheath station is a representative example of a standard Federation era railway building and is one of only two timber railway buildings along the Blue Mountains line. Partial reconstruction of the building following a fire in 1985, together with the restoration of Mortuary station, marked the beginning of heritage management in the NSW railways. The place is also significant for its local setting within well landscaped gardens and adjacent to the historic town centre.

The Blackheath Railway Station Shops have historical significance as an important and distinctive component of the precinct around Blackheath Railway Station. The buildings have some aesthetic significance as small Federation-era buildings with similarities in scale, detail, and form and are important elements in the local townscape. The buildings are also of significance for their associations with the prominent and influential identity Tomas Rodriguez, former Station Master at Blackheath Railway Station.

Blackheath railway station was listed on the New South Wales State Heritage Register on 2 April 1999 having satisfied a series of criteria marking its historical importance.

== See also ==
- List of railway stations in New South Wales
