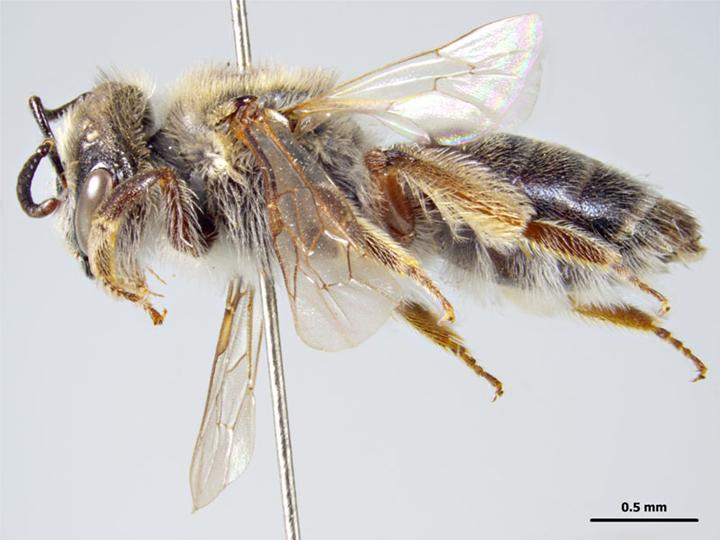
- Female

Scientific classification
- Kingdom: Animalia
- Phylum: Arthropoda
- Clade: Pancrustacea
- Class: Insecta
- Order: Hymenoptera
- Family: Colletidae
- Genus: Leioproctus
- Species: L. versicolor

Binomial name
- Leioproctus versicolor (Smith, 1853)

Synonyms
- Lamprocolletes versicolor Smith, 1853; Paracolletes spatulatus Cockerell, 1905

= Leioproctus versicolor =

Species of bee

Leioproctus versicolor, or Leioproctus (Leioproctus) versicolor, is a species of bee in the family Colletidae and subfamily Colletinae. It is endemic to Australia. It was described by English entomologist Frederick Smith in 1853.

== Distribution and habitat ==
The species occurs in south-eastern Australia. Type localities include Adelaide, South Australia, and Blackheath, New South Wales.

== Behaviour ==
The adults are flying mellivores. Flowering plants visited by the bees include Eucalyptus species.

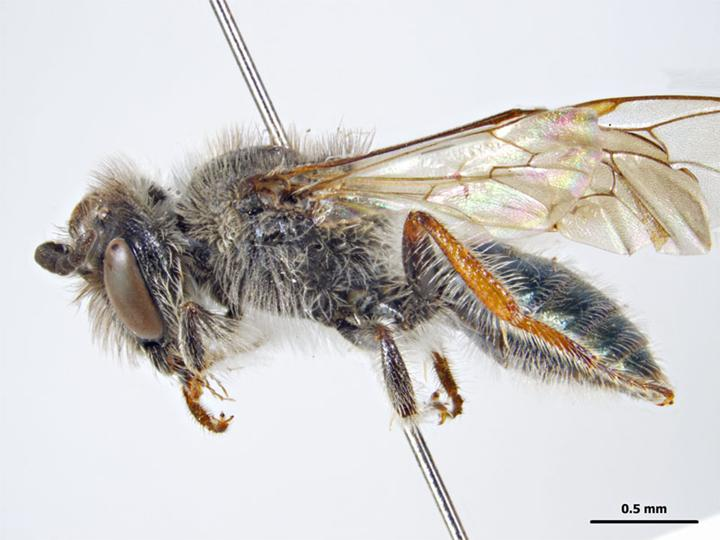
Male
