= Katoomba railway station =

Train station in New South Wales, Australia

Katoomba
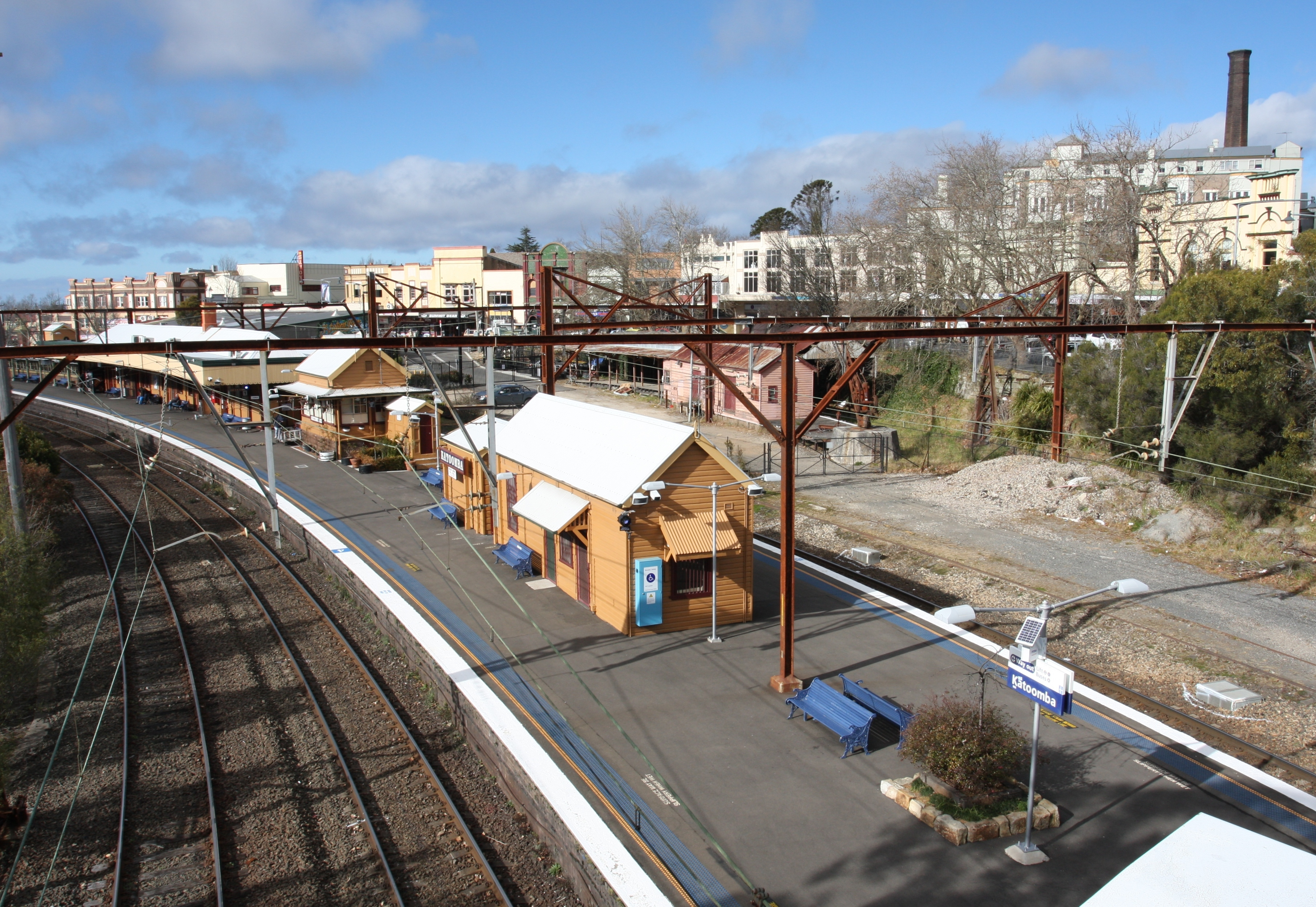
- Eastbound view of platforms and station buildings, April 2012

General information
- Location: Goldsmith Place, Katoomba; Australia
- Coordinates: 33°42′43″S 150°18′41″E
- Elevation: 1,016.8 metres (3,336 ft)
- Owner: Transport Asset Manager of New South Wales
- Operator: Sydney Trains
- Line: Main Western
- Distance: 109.94 kilometres (68.31 mi) from Central
- Platforms: 2 (1 island)
- Tracks: 3
- Connections: Bus; Coach

Construction
- Structure type: Ground
- Accessible: Yes

Other information
- Status: Staffed
- Station code: KTO
- Website: Transport for NSW

History
- Opened: 2 February 1874
- Former names: Crushers (1874–1877)

Passengers
- 2025: 774,133 (year); 2121 (daily) (Sydney Trains, NSW TrainLink)

Services
Preceding station	Intercity Trains	Following station
Medlow Bath towards Lithgow	Blue Mountains Line	Leura towards Central
Mount Victoria towards Bathurst	Blue Mountains Line (twice daily) Bathurst Bullet	Springwood towards Central
Preceding station	NSW TrainLink	Following station
Lithgow towards Dubbo	NSW TrainLink Western Line Dubbo XPT	Penrith towards Sydney
Lithgow towards Broken Hill	NSW TrainLink Western Line Broken Hill Outback Xplorer	Penrith towards Sydney
Location

Katoomba railway station is a heritage-listed railway station located on the Main Western line in Katoomba, New South Wales, Australia. It serves the Blue Mountains town of Katoomba opening on 2 February 1874 as Crushers, being renamed Katoomba on 9 July 1877.

A passing loop exists to the north of the station. West of the station is a disused yard. A level crossing immediately east of the station was replaced by a bridge west of the station on 31 January 1986.

The station was upgraded in 2001 with the provision of a lift.

It was added to the New South Wales State Heritage Register on 2 April 1999.

== Platforms and services ==
Katoomba has one island platform with two sides. It is serviced by Sydney Trains Blue Mountains Line services travelling from Sydney Central to Lithgow. Some services from Sydney terminate at Katoomba. The Bathurst Bullet operates 2 evening services to Bathurst.

It is also serviced by NSW TrainLink's Central West XPT and Outback Xplorer long-distance services to Dubbo and Broken Hill.

Platform	Line	Stopping pattern	Notes
1	Blue Mountains Line	services to Sydney Central & the occasional westbound service	
1	Western Region	services to Sydney Central	Set down only
2	Blue Mountains Line	services to Mount Victoria & Lithgow; 2 evening services to Bathurst terminating services from Sydney Central	
2	Western Region	services to Dubbo & Broken Hill	Pick up only

== Transport links ==
Blue Mountains Transit operates ten bus routes via Katoomba station, under contract to Transport for NSW:

- 685: to Wentworth Falls & North Wentworth Falls
- 685H: to Hazelbrook & North Hazelbrook
- 686: to Katoomba Golf Glub and Echo Point & Scenic World
- 690K: to Springwood
- 690H: to Katoomba Hospital
- 695: to South Leura
- 696: to South Katoomba
- 697: to North Katoomba
- 698: to Blackheath
- 698V: to Blackheath & Mount Victoria

== Description ==
=== Station building (1891) ===
External: The station building is a unique type 10 "Standard Eddy" design, with its curved form along the platform. The building is a single storey building of rusticated weatherboards with a hipped corrugated steel roof largely hidden behind the encircling cantilevered awning with a deep valance of fretwork timber boards. This building type is one of the first major buildings to have a cantilevered awning. The building and awning are constructed on a curve following the platform shape. Cast iron decorative brackets on timber moulded posts support the awning along both of the platforms. Fenestration includes timber double-hung windows with multi-paned upper sashes (coloured glazing), frosted glazing to bottom sashes, and timber panelled doors with multi-paned fanlights (coloured glazing). The building retains its original/early external configuration and fenestration.

Internal: The interiors of the station building generally retain the original layout combining (from west to east) a waiting room, booking office, staff room, clock room, station managers office, ladies toilet and gentlemen's toilets. The overall finishes include timber board wall and ceiling linings, moulded timber cornices and dado line, ceiling roses, fluorescent lighting, a fireplace in the SM's office with cast iron grate timber surrounds and tile hearth, and tile, linoleum or carpet floor finishes. Toilet fittings are modern.

=== Signal box (1902) ===
External: The signal box is a small timber structure on brick base with corrugated iron gabled roof and curved corrugated iron awning to all sides. It is 21 ft 6 in (6.55 m) long x 12 ft 6 in (3.81 m) wide located on the country end of the platform. The operating floor is 4 ft 2 in (1.27 m) above the platform level with L-shape stair access from the eastern side. Tall multi-paned ribbon windows all around the building provide a visual connection with the other platform structures. A small gabled timber panelled relay room with brick base and concrete steps is located just off the west elevation of the signal box.

Internal: The internal finishes of the signal box are similar to the main station building with timber board ceiling and wall linings and timber skirtings. A 40 lever type A PL interlocking machine with associated signalling equipment is the major element in the space and is still in operation. Access to the relay room is prohibited.

=== "Out of" shed (c. 1902) ===
External: A small rusticated weatherboard out-of-shed with gabled corrugated metal roof is located to the west of the signal box. It is used for flammable liquid storage and has only a timber board door with fanlight and a band window on the opposite elevation. Simple timber bargeboards and finials complete the gable ends.

Internal: Timber-framed structure with no internal wall and ceiling lining exposing the underside of the corrugated metal roofing and rusticated weatherboard. The floor is concrete.

=== Former inspector/electrician's office (1909 & 1945) ===
From 2009, this was used as a CCTV and meals room.

External: Combining the 1909 two-room former inspector/electrician's office structure and the 1945 staff meal room extension, the shed is the most western structure on the platform. It is of a rectangular rusticated weatherboard building with corrugated metal gabled roof. Skillion corrugated metal awnings with timber brackets above a window and main door. Vertically proportioned sash windows are placed equally on the long sides while the shorter sides have a window and a door opening with awning. Security grilles installed to the windows.

Internal: Internal features and finishes of the Shed are contemporary consisting of plaster board walls and ceilings with simple cornices. The kitchen of the staff meal room has a wall with rusticated weatherboard.

=== Island platform (1891) ===
Katoomba Railway Station has a curved island platform running approximately east–west. It is brick faced with concrete deck and asphalt finish. A number of garden beds and hanging pot plants together with remnant railway equipment/tools scattered between the buildings further enhance this unique curved station's setting. Modern lighting, timber bench seating, and signage are the other typical features of the platform. A new glass canopy is attached to the subway canopy at the eastern end.

=== Subway and awning (1891 & 1920) ===
The subway was constructed in 1891 with the awning added in 1920. The subway is constructed of face brick and displays unusual and well detailed construction with a curved flight of stairs leading from Bathurst Road. The scale of the subway is consistent with the importance accorded to Katoomba in the early 1890s. An exposed gabled roof in clearstory form with original/early iron truss roof structure and new corrugated metal roofing covers the ramp to the platform. Notable murals are located on both walls of the subway tunnel.

=== Signals branch office (1910) and yard office (1881/1891) ===
These two structures located adjacent to each other at the entrance to the yard form part of a relatively intact yard group. They are still used for railway purposes. They also have a close relationship to the railway station buildings. The structures are of a small scale with detailing consistent with the platform buildings.

Signals Branch Office: The signals branch office is a single storey weatherboard building to the northwest of the Progress Building. It is a simple rusticated weatherboard shed with a gabled roof and a vaulted roof vent running along the ridge of the roof. The original windows are small multi- pane double-hung sashes. A large double hung window and a door opening with a skillion roof on timber brackets has been added on the west wall. Internally it appears to have been recently reclad with plasterboard panels and painted. It is not in regular use at this time (2009).

Yard office: The yard office is also a weatherboard building with a simple gabled roof immediately south of the signals branch building. It is elevated on brick piers with no mortar and steel posts where the brick pier is missing. Two small four-pane casement windows are located on the side elevations while an unused door is located on the Station side of the shed. The shed appears to have been accessed from the Signals Branch Office (access was locked). An elevated ventilation roof at the ridge level with louvered sides and a skillion roofed timber lean-to the rear are other features of the Yard office.

=== Progress Building (1938) ===
The Progress Building is a single storey group of three shops facing south to Bathurst Road with an additional shopfront facing east to the exit from the railway station subway. The building has a rendered parapet wall to the street with curved elements and a simple cornice. Panels in the parapet wall indicate the names of the shops. The easternmost shop, 283-285 Bathurst Road, retains its original brass shopfront, albeit with some modification, and tiled piers between, the shop entries are recessed from the street with splayed shopfront reveals. The tiled and marble threshold records the name "MARX" an early Katoomba businessman who used the premises. The building has a skillion roof behind the parapet. The rear walls are of fibro with a weatherboard spandrel and have paired 2 pane casements windows with fanlights.

=== Goods shed (1881, altered 1884, moved 1891) ===
External: The goods shed is a standard building with significant alterations. The original structure was built around 1881 as the original station building with extension in 1891. The additions illustrate the increased freight handling of the yard. The goods shed is a simple gabled timber building on an east–west axis sited close to the south side of the yard. It is clad in weatherboard and elevated on brick piers and dwarf walls with timber floor. There is evidence of window openings being changed. A number of timber framed four-pane sash windows in various sizes are placed to the end of the front elevation and the side elevations. Two timber boarded double loading doors with timber docks and a timber panelled office door in the centre with timber ladder are also located on the front elevation.

Internal: Access to the interiors was not available (2009).

=== Timber platforms (1881) ===
A timber loading platform supported on brick piers and timber beams with a rail siding is attached to the western side of the Goods Shed. A timber corrugated metal awning widened by steel truss awning covers the entire platform. Another timber loading platform on timber posts is also attached to the eastern side of the Goods Shed just to the west of the Crane.

=== Crane (1884, moved 1891) ===
The crane is a Class 1, standard 5 tonne jib hand crane, No. T171, fixed on a stone base adjacent to the western timber platform. The stone base was not widely used. It is still in use irregularly and in fair condition.

=== Yard and gates (1883–1884) ===
The material and form of the original 1891 gates appear to have been removed and replaced with wire mesh and pipe gates at an unknown date. The yard is no longer used for regular loading and goods yard purposes. A sandstone retaining wall raises the railway boundary of the site, behind the goods shed, extending the Yeaman Bridge at the west. Another sandstone retaining wall raises along the railway site above Goldsmith Place on the northern side.

=== Eastern store shed (modern) ===
Located to east of platform is a large shed building, painted with a mural and corrugated iron roof. It does not form part of the heritage listing.

=== Moveable items ===
The following moveable items have been observed:

- 2 x Seth Thomas clocks: in the Booking office and the Signal Box
- A number of railway equipment, machinery and tools are scattered within the site including Simmos Siding display.
- 40 lever interlocking machine and signalling tools in the Signal Box
- First generation railway steel container at the station site
- Road tanker TBX from Hamilton Depot at the station site
- An early timber station naming sign attached to timber posts is located on the north side of the store.

=== Landscape features ===
A number of platform garden beds with shrubs and small trees and hanging pot plants exist along the platform. The Signal Box is adorned with hanging plants, memorabilia and stone edged planter beds, which form part of the significance of the station precinct.

The most significant landscape elements of the station are the brick walls around the station with sandstone retaining walls between the Progress Building and the Goods Yard. A mural by Vernon Treweeke below the Great Western Highway overbridge and the murals in the subway tunnel enhance the setting of the station group.

=== Potential for Archaeology ===
The goods yard has archaeological potential in providing evidence of the first station buildings and structures as well as the operational elements of the yard.

=== Modifications and dates ===
The following modifications were undertaken over the years:

- 10 September 1898: Platform extended.
- 21 August 1901: Platform extended at the eastern end.
- 1 November 1907: Platform extended at the western end.
- 7 July 1917: Up Refuge siding extended.
- 10 May 1920; Awning erected between station building and steps.
- 4 August 1923; Additions made to station building and booking office and electric light fitted to the station.
- 15 September 1925: Up Refuge siding extended.
- 1964: Residence at 8 Abbotsford Rd sold
- 9 July 1977: Transfer of "F" level crossing lights to signal box which was in the gate cabin WN27, and installation of closed-circuit television to view the level crossing.
- 1981: Gate house at 109.817 km demolished
- Unknown date: Level crossing closed, replaced by an overbridge further west.
- Unknown date: Entrance to station considerably altered. Numerous changes to other buildings on the platform and in the goods yard.

== History ==
The railway from Wentworth Falls to Mount Victoria was opened in 1868, passing through what was to become Katoomba. The Great Western Railway was intended to initially reach Bathurst but, beyond that town, its terminus was not stated.

The Katoomba station opened in 1874 as "The Crushers". A sandstone quarry suitable for producing ballast for the construction and maintenance of the line was developed just to the north of the line, and from 1874 The Crushers was a stopping-place for trains with quarrymen, equipment and wagons for transporting ballast. A platform was provided in 1877 close to the level-crossing keeper's cottage (demolished in 1902).

In 1881, a new timber platform and station were built, to the west of the level-crossing. The goods yard between the stations and Bathurst Road (then the Great Western Highway) was developed in 1883–4. This expansion was necessary because of Katoomba's growth in the 1880s and 1890s as a tourist and local commercial centre. The goods yard contains a valuable collection of traditional railway structures, including the 5 ton jib crane (no. T171), the goods shed 54' x 12' dating in part from 1881 and an unusual curved timber loading platform. There is also an office for the yard gatekeeper and for a signalman, all dating from the early 1900s.

In 1891, the 1881 station building was moved to the improved goods yard to the south. The Katoomba Times reported on 10 October 1891 that "the old Katoomba station building is to be the goods shed, and was put into position last Wednesday (7 October 1891)", with the 1884 crane adjacent to the east. Around 1921 the goods yard was altered, the siding was realigned and the goods shed (the former station of 1881) was moved 18 metres to the east, where it still resides. The 1884 five-tonne crane was moved along with the shed to its present position.

The present island platform and building at Katoomba date from 1891 and was constructed for £6,922 (including the subway) by builders Quiggan and Kermode. They are unusual for two reasons. Firstly, the timber building is curved and, secondly, the building design was only used in the Sydney metropolitan rail system. It is the only such building constructed outside the Central-to -Parramatta line. It is one of four such structures remaining extant from a number of stations containing Type 10 buildings including Newtown, MacDonaldtown, Ashfield, Lewisham (all demolished – possibly other examples) and Summer Hill, Homebush and Croydon (extant). Extensions to the building in the same style were carried out in 1913 for £216. Its dominant feature is the extension of the roof bearers to form awnings on both sides and the position of small ornate brackets under the awning beams, marking a transition from the use of posted verandas to cantilevered awnings. The platform was reached by the use of a pedestrian subway constructed in 1891, which were rare outside Sydney.

The other main platform building is the elevated, timber signal box, which was commissioned in 1903. The signal box contains a cam and tappet 40 lever interlocking machine that was installed in 1945. It is typical of the construction time and is similar to boxes at Mount Victoria, Newnes Junction, Lithgow Yard and Exeter.

The line was duplicated in 1902. A two-room timber building was built on the western end of the platform in 1909 for an inspector and an electrician and this building was extended in 1945 for use as a staff meal room. An "out-of" shed completed the platform structures.

At the entrance to the Station are the "Progress Buildings" which are shown on a plan as part of a new "Booking and Parcels Office Building" dated 20 December 1938. The buildings are a single storey group of three shops facing south to Bathurst Road with an additional shopfront facing east to the exit from the railway station subway. The easternmost shop, 283-285 Bathurst Road, retains its original brass shopfront, albeit with some modification, and tiled piers between, the shop entries are recessed from the street with splayed shopfront reveals. The tiled and marble threshold records the name "MARX" an early Katoomba businessman who used the premises. The Progress Buildings are still owned by Transport Asset Holding Entity and leased for private business.

The railway residence at 8 Abbotsford Road was sold in 1964.

== Heritage listing ==
As at 23 September 2010, Katoomba Railway Station and Yard is of state significance as a unique railway site in NSW developed around a former ballast quarry and is significant for demonstrating Katoomba's growth in the 1880s and 1890s as the first tourist and local commercial centre in the Blue Mountains, before the duplication of the Western line in 1902.

The 1891 station building is significant as one of few surviving timber railway station buildings known as " Standard Eddy", designed under Commissioner Eddy, and demonstrating the introduction of island platform buildings in NSW. Katoomba station building is the only known example of this station type outside the inner city area and is unique to the other examples for its curved form along the platform. The adjacent signal box with its garden beds and planting is also an important and integral element within the station group and is a rare example of a timber on-platform signal box.

The site of the goods yard is of particular significance as it was part of the original Katoomba station precinct dating from 1878, which was used for locomotive turning and minor servicing and stabling of trains. While fulfilling a minor railway use at present for per way maintenance, it contains two relatively rare items, which are the former 1881 timber station building as its goods shed and the 1891 crane.

The station group comprises a homogenous collection of timber structures adding significance to the townscape and streetscape with direct relationships to both. Situated at the focal point of Katoomba, the station is connected visually and physically to the town's commercial heart by the pedestrian subway and landscaped surrounds. The adjacent Progress Buildings from part of the station group and contribute to the early 20th Century character of the commercial precinct of Katoomba with their largely intact shopfronts.

Katoomba railway station was listed on the New South Wales State Heritage Register on 2 April 1999 having satisfied the following criteria.

The place is important in demonstrating the course, or pattern, of cultural or natural history in New South Wales.

Katoomba Station and Yard Group is of historical significance as a unique early station and yard developed around a ballast quarry demonstrating Katoomba's growth in the 1880s and 1890s as a tourist and local commercial centre before the duplication of the Western line in 1902.

The site of the goods yard was part of the original Katoomba station precinct dating from 1878, which was used for locomotive turning and minor servicing and stabling of trains. While fulfilling a minor railway use at present for per way maintenance using temporary buildings it contains two relatively rare items of mid-20th Century railway heritage significance, which are 1881 timber station building as its goods shed and the 1891 crane.

The place has a strong or special association with a person, or group of persons, of importance of cultural or natural history of New South Wales's history.

The station has historical association with Commissioner Eddy due to his involvement in the design of the 1891 station building known as "The Standard Eddy" design.

The place is important in demonstrating aesthetic characteristics and/or a high degree of creative or technical achievement in New South Wales.

Katoomba Railway Station is of aesthetic significance as one of few surviving timber railway station buildings known as "The Standard Eddy" (as it was designed under Commissioner Eddy) outside of the Sydney metropolitan area including Newtown, MacDonaldtown, Ashfield, Lewisham (all demolished) and Summer Hill, Homebush and Croydon (extant). Katoomba station building features an unusual deep timber valance to the awnings and it is unique to the other examples for its curved form along the platform. The tunnel connection with its gabled roof and associated glazing makes a pleasant sheltered walkway connecting the station to the town's commercial heart. The sandstone retaining walls to the north and south of the site are well built solutions to the perpetual problems of dealing with the Katoomba's topography and contribute to the character of the townscape. The Progress Building contributes to the character of the commercial precinct of Katoomba with their intact shopfronts and simple weatherboards and fibro character to the rear. The signal box is also an important and integral element within the station-scape of Katoomba.

The place has a strong or special association with a particular community or cultural group in New South Wales for social, cultural or spiritual reasons.

The place has the potential to contribute to the local community's sense of place, and can provide a connection to the local community's past.

The place has potential to yield information that will contribute to an understanding of the cultural or natural history of New South Wales.

Katoomba Station and Yard Group is of research significance for its demonstrative ability in providing evidence of construction techniques and form of a station and yard in the 1880s and 1890s before the Western railway line duplication. The goods yard has archaeological potential in providing evidence of the first station buildings and structures as well as the operational elements of the yard.

The place possesses uncommon, rare or endangered aspects of the cultural or natural history of New South Wales.

This item is assessed as historically rare. This item is assessed as scientifically rare. This item is assessed as arch. rare. This item is assessed as socially rare.

The place is important in demonstrating the principal characteristics of a class of cultural or natural places/environments in New South Wales.

Katoomba Station and Yard Group is representative of Victorian era station development combining unique station buildings and yard demonstrating the close relationship between the yard and station as well as reflecting the direct relationship between the station layout and the growth of the local area.
