= The Blackheath Beacon =

Former newspaper in New South Wales, Australia

Joseph Bennett & Son began publication of The Blackheath Beacon in November 1930 and ceased publication with its twentieth issue on 27 March 1931. It was published in Blackheath.

== History ==
Joseph Bennett & Son began publication of The Blackheath Beacon in November 1930. A local office and printery was opened in Blackheath on the corner of Hat Hill Road and Wentworth Street and the paper circulated through Blackheath, Medlow Bath, Mount Victoria and Hartley Vale. However, the Beacon proved not to be “a paying concern” and the local office closed in February 1931. The paper continued to be printed at Bennett’s Cascade Street office in Katoomba for another month or so but finally ceased publication with its twentieth issue on 27 March 1931.

Issues 1-8 (i.e. 7 November 1930 - 2 January 1931) are very badly damaged. The top half of each page has been torn off. Issue No.3 (21 November 1930) is missing. A facsimile copy of issue No.5 (5 December 1930) was published some years ago and a copy is held in the Blue Mountains City Library’s Local Studies Collection.

== Digitisation ==
The Blackheath Beacon has been digitised as part of the Australian Newspapers Digitisation Program project of the National Library of Australia.

== See also ==
- List of newspapers in New South Wales
- List of newspapers in Australia
