= Medlow Bath, New South Wales =

Medlow Bath
- Suburb
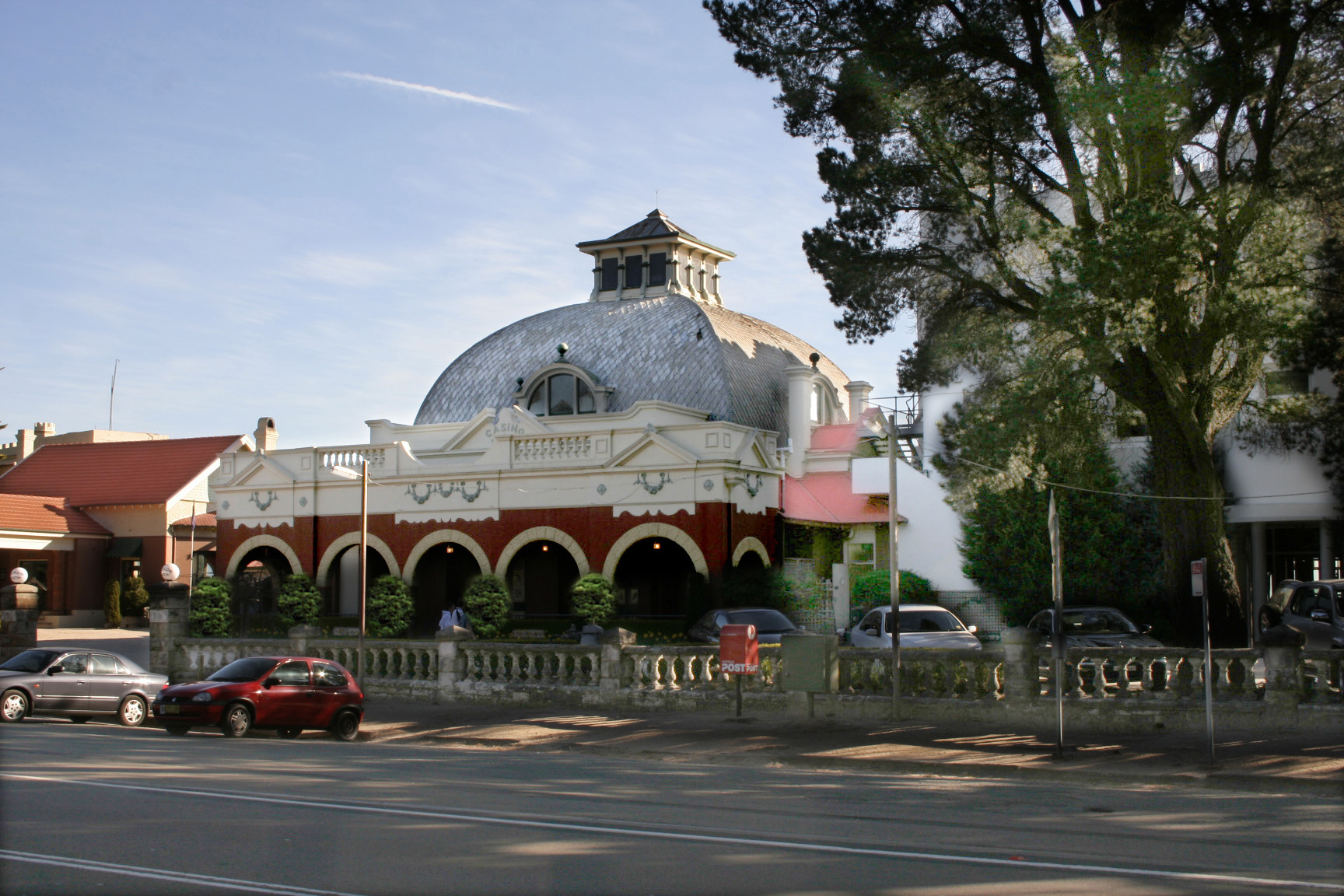
- Hydro Majestic Hotel, at Medlow Bath, 2008

- Interactive map of Medlow Bath
- Coordinates: 33°40′26″S 150°16′50″E
- Country: Australia
- State: New South Wales
- LGA: City of Blue Mountains
- Location: 115 km (71 mi) west north-west of Sydney CBD; 5 km (3.1 mi) NW of Katoomba; 35 km (22 mi) SE of Lithgow
- Established: circa 1870

Government
  - State electorate: Blue Mountains
  - Federal division: Macquarie
- Elevation: 1,050 m (3,440 ft)

Population
  - Total: 569 (2021 census)
- Postcode: 2780
Suburbs around Medlow Bath
Megalong Valley	Blackheath	Blue Mountains National Park
Megalong Valley	Medlow Bath	Blue Mountains National Park
Blue Mountains National Park	Katoomba	Katoomba

Medlow Bath (postcode: 2780) is a village located near the highest point of the Blue Mountains, New South Wales, Australia. Located between Katoomba and Blackheath, its altitude is about 1,050 metres (3,440 ft) AHD. It is about 115 kilometres (71 mi) west-north-west of the Sydney central business district and 5 kilometres (3.1 mi) north-west of Katoomba. At the 2021 census, Medlow Bath had a population of 569 people.

== Description and history ==
Medlow Bath is set in a semi-rural area which includes fire-prone eucalypt forest, and has been subject to bushfire threats many times during its history.

The Hydro Majestic Hotel was developed by Sydney businessman, Mark Foy in the early years of the twentieth century and was the main economic activity in the area, until bushfires nearly destroyed the hotel in the summer of 2003.

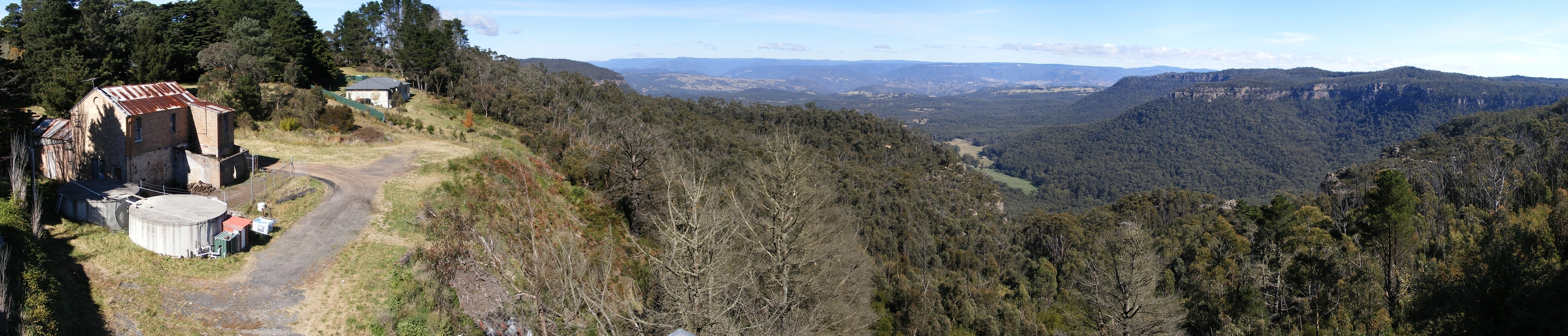
View from behind the Hydro Majestic Hotel, with Shipley Plateau on the right.

There is an elaborate network of walking tracks, which were developed in the bushland between the hotel and the escarpment of the Megalong Valley. The tracks offer scope for many fine bushwalks and views of the Megalong Valley, but in more recent years have deteriorated due to lack of maintenance. Other tracks in the area include Bruce's Walk, an old track that was upgraded by bushwalkers and other volunteers in the 1980s. Bruce's Walk is located a few kilometres east of Medlow Bath, on the fringes of the Blue Mountains National Park, a huge park that is now a World Heritage Site.

Australia's first Prime Minister, Edmund Barton, died at the Hydro Majestic Hotel in 1920.

Medlow Bath was originally known as Brown's Siding when it gave its name to a railway siding in 1880 because Brown's Sawmill was the main business in the area. In 1883, the town was renamed Medlow because there was another Brown's Siding near Lithgow.

== Heritage listings ==
Medlow Bath has a number of heritage-listed sites, including:

- Blue Mountains National Park: Blue Mountains walking tracks
- Beauchamp Road: Medlow Dam
- Great Western Highway: Medlow Bath railway station

== Population ==
72.9% of people were born in Australia and 85.0% of people spoke only English at home. The most common responses for religion were No Religion 39.6%, Catholic 19.1% and Anglican 11.0%.

== Transport ==
Medlow Bath was connected to the Main Western railway line in 1880, when the station was called Brown's Siding. Medlow Bath railway station is now served by the Blue Mountains Line.

The Great Western Highway is the main road access route.

Katoomba Airfield, now disused except in emergency situations, is also located a few kilometres east of Medlow Bath.

Blue Mountains Transit operates two bus routes through the suburb of Medlow Bath:

- 698: Katoomba to Blackheath
- 698V: Katoomba to Mount Victoria
