= Mount Victoria railway station =

Railway station in New South Wales, Australia

Mount Victoria
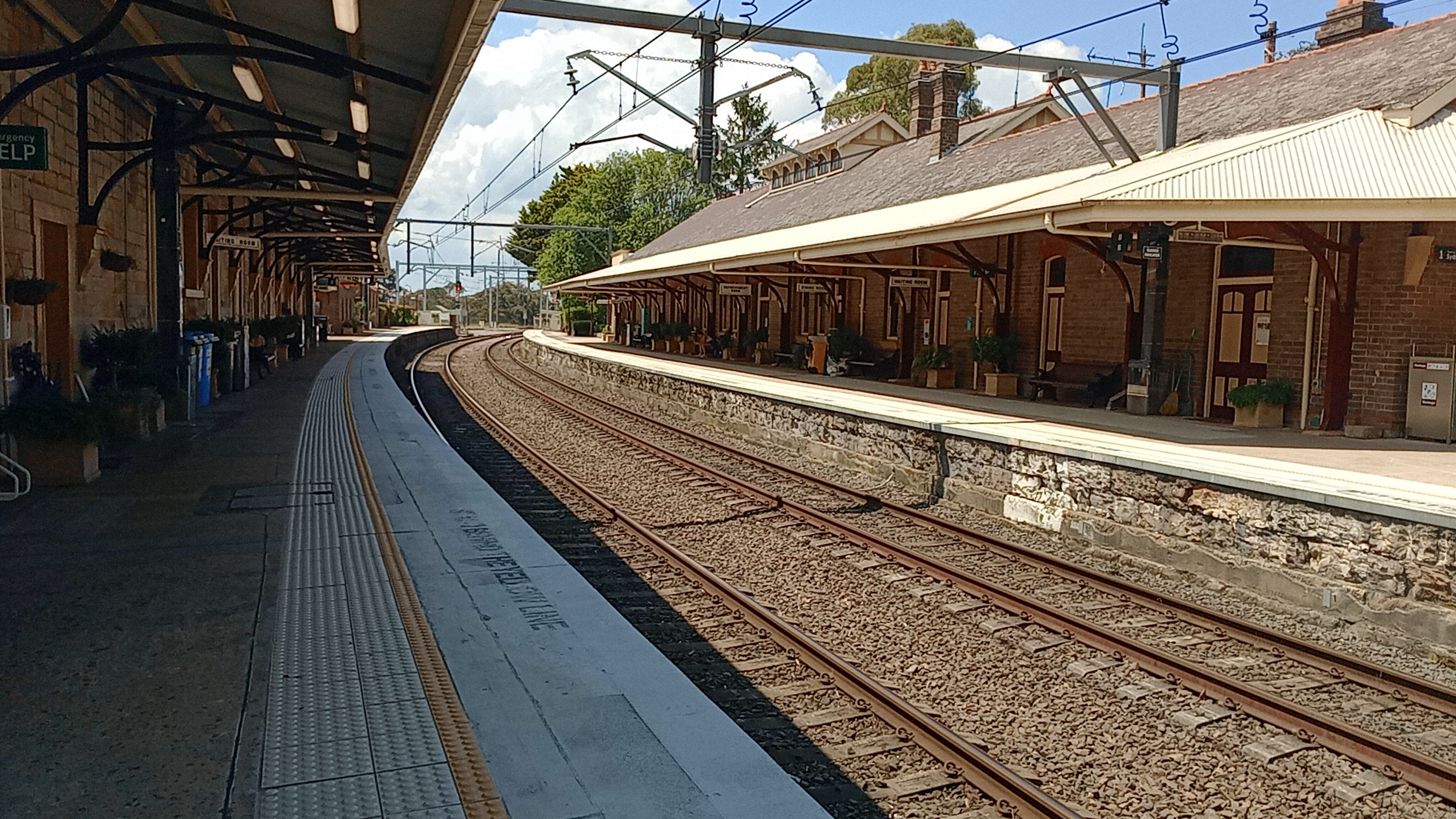
- Westbound view from Platform 2 looking at station buildings, December 2024

General information
- Location: Darling Causeway, Mount Victoria; Australia
- Coordinates: 33°35′16″S 150°15′25″E
- Elevation: 1,043.6 metres (3,424 ft)
- Owner: Transport Asset Manager of New South Wales
- Line: Main Western
- Distance: 126.72 km (78.74 mi) from Central
- Platforms: 2 side
- Tracks: 2
- Train operators: Sydney Trains
- Bus stands: 1
- Connections: Coach

Construction
- Structure type: Ground
- Accessible: No

Other information
- Status: Staffed
- Station code: MVR
- Website: Transport for NSW

History
- Opened: 1 May 1868

Passengers
- 2025: 58,214 (year); 159 (daily) (Sydney Trains, NSW TrainLink)

Services
Preceding station	Intercity Trains	Following station
Bell towards Lithgow	Blue Mountains Line	Blackheath towards Central
Bell towards Lithgow	Blue Mountains Line Limited express	Blackheath towards Central
Lithgow towards Bathurst	Blue Mountains Line (4 daily services) Bathurst Bullet	Katoomba towards Central
Preceding station	Journey Beyond	Following station
Broken Hill One-way operation	Indian Pacific Stops en route to Sydney only	Sydney Terminus

New South Wales Heritage Register
- Official name: Mount Victoria Railway Station group
- Type: State heritage (complex / group)
- Designated: 2 April 1999
- Reference no.: 1203
- Type: Railway Platform / Station
- Category: Transport – Rail
- Builders: Allan McClean and James Barrie (1868 building)
Location

Mount Victoria railway station is a heritage-listed former barracks and now staff accommodation, guest accommodation, railway signal box and railway station located on the Main Western line in Mount Victoria in the City of Blue Mountains local government area of New South Wales, Australia. It was designed by NSW Government Railways and built from 1868 to 1913 by Allan McClean and James Barrie (1868 building). The property was added to the New South Wales State Heritage Register on 2 April 1999. The station opened on 1 May 1868.

The Platform 2 building dates from 1868 with a railway refreshment room added in 1884. The Platform 1 building dates from 1911 when the line was duplicated. An extensive yard including a locomotive depot existed west of the station.

== History ==
Mount Victoria has always been an important railway centre since its opening in 1868. It was the first platform structure made of material other than timber built after Penrith station. The original station building still remains and was to a design consistent with the time of John Whitton, Engineer-in-Chief of the NSW Railways. Further additions were carried out in 1899 to the ladies' toilet and other areas. The parcels office was added in 1911 to the Sydney end of the building.

In 1884, the two level stone addition containing the Railway Refreshment Room was built under the supervision of George Cowdery, Engineer-in-Chief for Existing Lines and was built by George Dengate. The Refreshment Room contained on the upper level eight bedrooms for travellers and quarters for the Manager and family, again typical of NSW practice. Alterations to the Refreshment Room occurred in 1919 and additional bedrooms were built at the rear in 1943. The Refreshment Room closed in 1957.

A locomotive depot existed at Mount Victoria in 1897 and was greatly expanded in 1911-13 when duplication of the line through Mount Victoria was completed. The depot was home to the locomotives and crews who worked the famous "The Fish" commuter train to Sydney. Mount Victoria also was the destination of the Caves Express from Sydney, which conveyed holidaymakers to the Blue Mountains.

The construction of accommodation for enginemen, train guards and other on-board staff has been provided by the NSW Government Railways from the 1880s. In the late 1890s, a standard design of barracks was approved. Those at Mount Victoria reflected a standard arrangement with rows of four bedrooms on each side of the building. There was also a central kitchen and meal room, reflected in the roof scape by a large transverse gable. A toilet and Attendant's Room completed the plan. It continues also to be used for non-overnight purposes, for meals and locker accommodation.

Also on the Lithgow-bound platform is an elevated signal box. It was constructed in 1911 and continues in service (2009). It is built to the typical elevated signal box design dominant between 1910 and 1920.

A free-standing male toilet was built towards the western end of the Lithgow-bound platform in 1900. The verandah posts which supported the original platform awnings on the Lithgow-bound platform were removed in 1927. This was part of a programme to modernise the appearance of platform buildings by the use of large brackets which had begun in the 1890s under Chief Commissioner, E.M.G. Eddy.

The present Sydney-bound platform was built to serve the duplication west to Hartley in 1911, and the present buildings provided. It featured a second Railway Refreshment Room with the traditional lantern roof, which closed in 1957. The 1911 Up platform building is roofed with slates. This is possibly the last station to utilise slates as a roofing material.

The station's history is closely linked to Jenolan Caves. The station was the destination for the famous "Caves Express" which operated between the 1920s and 1942 conveying holidaymakers to the Blue Mountains. It was also the nightly destination of the famous "The Fish" train from Sydney. It was the only destination on the NSW railway system to have two named trains terminate, one for commuters and the other for tourists.

The pedestrian footbridge linking both platforms was of truss form and built in 1911, replacing an earlier c.1896 bridge. It is largely in original condition and is typical of the design used throughout the NSW railway system.

A Station Master's Cottage was also constructed in 1868 and was similar to another 11 residences on the Blue Mountains built in stone. The structure was demolished over 30 years ago but the keystone showing the date of construction is still extant. It is now located in the Baden Powell Park, Mount Victoria. The history of the cottage is important as it illustrates that residences not always reflected the status of the occupant. In this case, the Station Master received the same type and size structure as did Gatekeepers on the line.

The train involved in the 1977 Granville Rail Disaster, consisting of eight passenger carriages hauled by 46 class electric locomotive 4620, commenced its journey towards Sydney's Central Railway Station at 6:09 am. At approximately 8:10 am, whilst approaching Granville railway station, the locomotive derailed and struck one of the steel-and-concrete pillars supporting the bridge carrying Bold Street over the railway cutting, causing the bridge to fall on the derailed train, killing 84 passengers. "The Day of the Roses" and its associated death toll has been regarded as Australia's worst peacetime railway accident, eclipsing the death toll of the Camp Mountain Rail Accident that occurred in Queensland on 5 May 1947.

== Platforms and services ==
Mount Victoria has two side platforms. It is serviced by Sydney Trains Blue Mountains Line services travelling from Sydney Central to Lithgow. Some services terminate at Mount Victoria and stable in the sidings west of the station. The Bathurst Bullet operates two evening services to Bathurst.

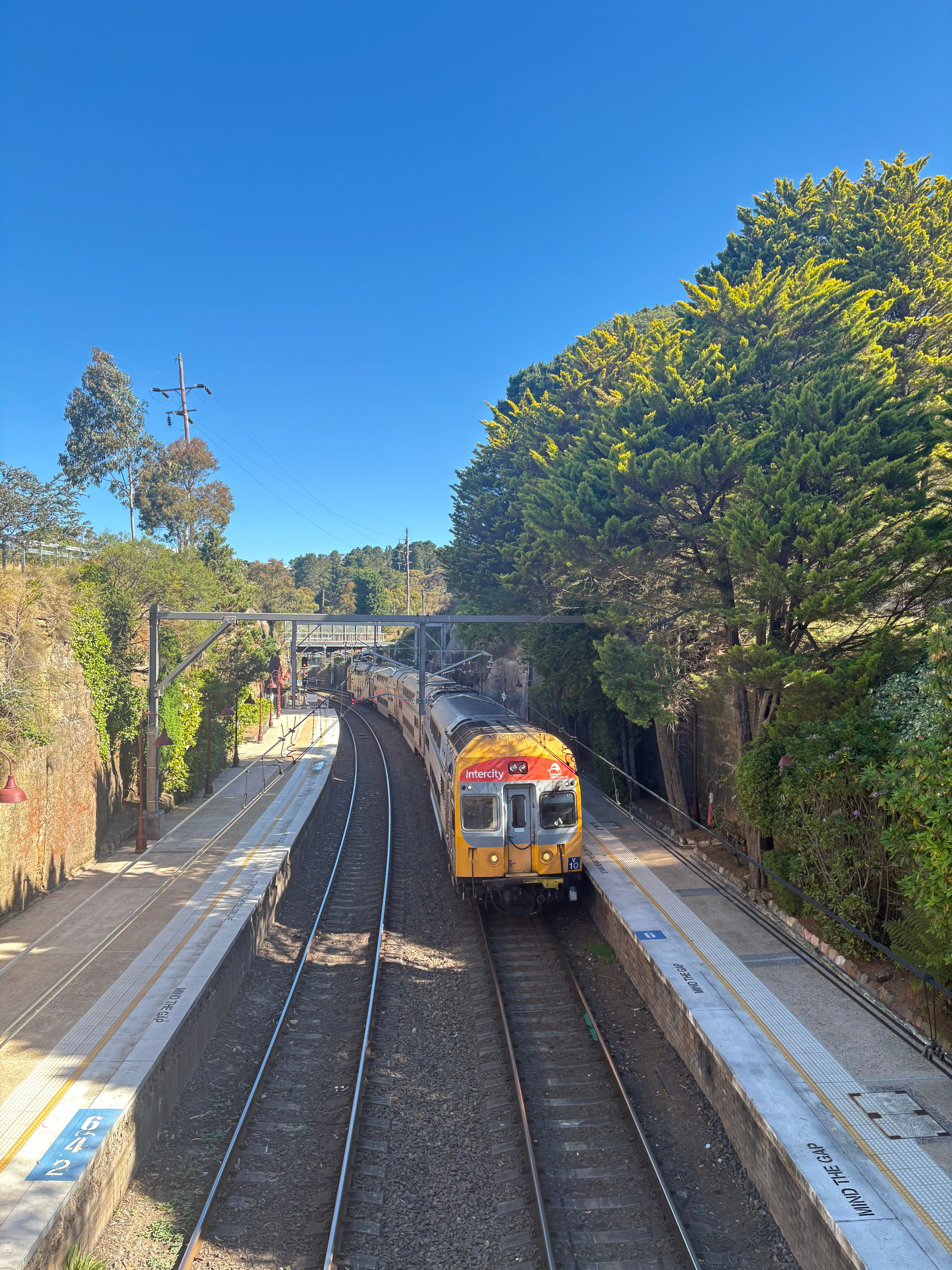
Eastward view from the footbridge, as a V set arrives on a Lithgow service

Journey Beyond's weekly Indian Pacific also passes through Mount Victoria, but stops when traveling towards Sydney only.

Platform	Line	Stopping pattern	Notes
1	Indian Pacific	to Sydney Central	disembarkation only
1	Blue Mountains Line	services to Sydney	
2	Blue Mountains Line	services to Lithgow; 2 evening services to Bathurst	

== Description ==
The complex includes a type 3, second class, sub-type 1, stone station building for platform 2, erected in 1869 with a refreshment room, erected in 1884; and a type 11, brick station building for platform 1, erected in 1913; platform 1 Lavatory Block 1 (c. 1900); platform 2 Lavatory Block (c. 1900); a signal box – type E, 48 lever, brick on platform 2 (1911); barracks/Rest house, brick (1911–1913); and the site of the former Station Master's Cottage (1868).

Other structures include a part stone and part brick faced platform 1, erected in the 1870s; a brick faced platform 2, erected in 1911; a footbridge (1911); and various other structures.

=== Station building platform 2 (1869, 1884) ===
External: Constructed of stone with a slate roof the station building on Platform 2 is a "type 3", second class station building altered to include refreshment rooms on the upper level with later brick extensions to both Up and Down ends. Its key features include a large two-storey central stone building flanked by attached stone and brick single-storey wing structures, a hipped slate roof to main building, gambrel roof to the Up end wing and flat roof to Down end wing, timber framed double-hung windows and timber panelled doors with standard iron brackets over decorative corbels supporting wide platform awnings, fretted timber work to both ends of awnings. The main two-storey central building features four tall brick chimneys with stone base and tops (one with chimney pot), bracketed eaves and segmental arched tall windows to the upper level. The single-storey sandstone south wing is part of the original station building with pitched slate roof and brick extension with corrugated metal gambrel roof and a brick chimney. The stone eaves of the original south wing are visible over the later platform awning. The south wing (ladies room) is a painted brick on the platform side and face brick on the car park side featuring tall face brick chimneys with corbelled tops and double-hung timber framed windows. An enclosed cantilevered balcony is located on the west side of the central wing, supported on cast iron brackets with iron lace (mostly removed). A ground floor brick and weatherboard skillion addition with a tall brick chimney is also located on the west side of the central wing.

Internal: The original layout of the station building in its extended form remains. The room arrangement on the ground floor includes combined station master's office, ticket office and booking office, general waiting room, and ladies room. The upper level accommodates the local museum with entry via the rear staircase. The station refreshment rooms no longer function. The original internal finishes include decorative plaster ceiling and moulded plaster cornices to the waiting room and ladies waiting room, moulded timber architraves to original building joinery, plasterboard ceilings to amenities, and tile and carpet floorings. All fireplaces have been enclosed.

=== Station building platform 1 (1913) ===
External: A single-storey building with slate gabled roof, gabled lantern roof to the centre and terracotta ridge capping. The walls are of face brick with black tuckpointed red brick jack arches to the openings. The walls have a brick plinth with red splay bricks. The south 5 bays are recessed with red bricks to the head of the recesses. The platform side of the building has timber framed double-hung windows with multi-paned upper sashes and double doors with coloured multi-pane fanlights. A double-hung ticket window is also located at the south end of the building. The building has various gabled wings at the rear. A cantilevered awning over the platform is supported on steel brackets on stanchions. It returns around the south side of the building and extends north to link with the lavatory building. A fretwork valance finishes the bay between the platform building and the lavatory. The half timber panelled gable end is visible behind the awnings.

Internal: The Platform 1 building is generally used by station staff and consists of two locked rooms and a general waiting room in the centre. The waiting room features decorative plaster ceiling, moulded timber architraves to window and door surrounds, a timber moulded dado above rendered dado line, timber skirting board and bricked in fireplace. Staff rooms were not accessible.

=== Platform 1 Lavatory Block (c. 1911) ===
External: A single-storey face brick men's lavatory building with a parapeted gable on the platform side featuring roughcast frieze between moulded string courses. The roof is of corrugated metal with exposed rafters. The other features include a four-panelled door with arched fanlight, a louvered/fixed window on the north side with segmental brick arch and decorative stone sill, and a double window on the platform elevation with louvered upper sashes, segmental arch and decorative stone sill.

=== Platform 2 Lavatory Block (c. 1900) ===
External: A single storey face brick gabled building with a brick screen wall on the south side providing privacy to the men's toilet entry. The building has a corrugated metal roof and plain bargeboards. The door and window openings have segmental arch lintels with louvers to the windows on east side and slots for ventilation in the gable ends.

=== Signal box (1911) ===
External: A large two-storey face-brick and timber signal box with a corrugated iron gabled roof featuring simple bargeboards, turned timber finial and boxed eaves. The gable end is clad with rusticated weatherboards and has a timber vent. The signal box is located on the Platform 2 (Down side) with the floor level raised above platform level. It has 6-pane horizontal sliding band windows on the upper floor some with internal steel security mesh. There are 9-pane arched windows on the ground floor with rendered sills. Access is via steel stairs to a landing on the south elevation.

Internal: The signal box retains many of its original/early equipment within a refurbished and interiors including plasterboard panelled ceilings, modern light fittings, vinyl floor coverings, modern kitchen facility and cupboards. Early timber panelled walls in the store room still exist. The signal box and its 48 lever mechanical frame were decommissioned in 2022.

=== Barracks/Rest House (1911–1913) ===
External: Located to the northeast of the station near No.26 Patrick Street, the barracks building is a single-storey gabled building on north–south axis with enclosed verandahs on the east and west elevations. The building is constructed of face brickwork, stretcher bond to the end walls, and Flemish bond under the verandahs. The gables have plain bargeboards with fretted timber boards to enclosed verandah ends. The large roof has been sheeted with corrugated metal. A large brick gable on the east side facing Patrick Street marks the original entry and is emphasized by a breakfront in the verandah. The verandah feature fibrocement panels to the bottom with brick base and band single-pane louvered windows to the upper portion. A brick chimney is located on the kitchen side of the building.

Internal: The floor layout of the barracks has been altered. An outer passageway exists, which was formally the verandah and external facades. Double-hung windows with simple concrete window sills, timber doors and simple face-brick walls are evident with ventilation grilles along the concrete base. The interior consists of six bedrooms, and a communal kitchen and lounge room area. Floors are tiled and modern fluorescent lights have been installed. Rooms were refurbished with modern skirting boards, architraves, bathroom amenities, and kitchen facilities.

=== Site of former Station Master's Cottage (1868) ===
The site of former Station Master's Cottage was built in 1868 and was constructed of stone similar to the pointsman's cottage at Glenbrook. The cottage was located a short distance to the south of the station and continued to be occupied by successive station masters until the twentieth century. It was demolished in 1934 when it became redundant and in poor condition due to vacancy for a long period. The site of the former cottage is now in a park named after Errol Barden, a Blue Mountains Shire Council employee who took a special interest in the environment of Mount Victoria.

=== Platform 1 (1870) ===
Platform 1 is a curved side platform and constructed of part stone and part brick faced with concrete deck and asphalt finish. The platform is highly vegetated along the eastern side rocky escarpments with various mature trees, shrubs and potted plants along the length of the platform. The platform also features period and modern light fittings, timber bench seating, a number of early and modern signage and aluminium palisade fencing to both ends of the platform.

=== Platform 2 (1911) ===
Platform 2 is a roadside platform and constructed of brick faced with concrete deck and asphalt finish. It was widened at the time of duplication and the addition of the new awning. This platform is also highly vegetated with various mature trees, shrubs and potted plants along the length of the platform. It also features period and modern light fittings, timber bench seating, early and modern signage, an early bubbler and aluminium palisade fencing to both ends and along the street side of the platform.

=== Footbridge (1911) ===
The footbridge is a standard Warren truss trestle and stairway with Hardie board long plank timber deck and channel iron stair stringers. The railing is supported on curved mild steel brackets. The footbridge connects both platforms and as the station is situated in a cutting, it extends on one side to the top of the embankment to connect to Patrick Street in the east and Station Street to the west. The balustrades to the stairs are timber post and handrail with wire mesh infill while the sides of the bridge enclosed with corrugated metal sheeting.

=== Moveable items ===
- Early Platform signs
- Platform Lighting – pendant style period pole lighting in group of two or one pendants with decorative brackets and pole base
- Bubbler on platform 2 near the waiting room
- Seth Thomas brand clock ID # 2418 in the signal box
- 48 lever interlocking frame, CTC panel, signal tools, emergency board and equipment, boarded fireplace & chimney breast, glass fronted framed notice board, framed signal information board, 1956 book shelf and supports in the signal box
- 2 x L-shaped early timber seats in the Platform 1 waiting room
- Early iron scale outside of SM's office on Platform 2
- Period timber bench seats on both platforms

=== Landscape features ===
The setting of the station within the rock escarpment is the typical natural setting of the Blue Mountains stations. The station features a numerous collection of flora ranging from mature trees, shrubs and potted plants along both platforms, adding to the historic character of the station group.

=== Potential archaeological features ===
There are no known potential archaeological elements on the station. However, a number of remnant sidings, levers and giants from the earlier electrification system exist along the rock escarpment of Platform 1 and may have archaeological potential. The site of the former Station Master's cottage also has archaeological potential.

=== Condition ===
- Platform 1 Station Building – Good
- Platform 2 Station Building – Generally Good Condition (cement render at the bottom of the stone walls detrimental to the stone walls)
- Lavatory Blocks – Very Good externally
- Signal Box – Very good
- Barracks/Rest House – Generally in Good condition
- Site of former SM's cottage – not inspected
- Platforms – Good
- Footbridge – Generally Good with evidence of natural wear & rusting

The overall integrity of the station and its buildings is high. The majority of the buildings at the station are intact with minor changes to their exteriors. Although modified, the barracks maintains their overall integrity at a moderate level. The footbridge has high integrity and intactness.

=== Modifications and dates ===
- 1868–1884: Platform 2 station building extended to provide refreshment rooms with extended awning, rear awning removed
- 1891: Minor renovations and extension to awning of Platform 2 station building.
- 1898: Additions and repairs to Platform 2 station building.
- 1902: Improvements to Platform 2 station building.
- 1993: Internal upgrade works to Platform 1 and Platform 2 station buildings
- N.d: Ticket window at south end of Platform 1 station building bricked up and the cantilevered balcony has most cast iron removed and is infilled with fibro and louvred windows.
- N.d: Flush doors added to barracks building, internal layout altered, and the verandah enclosed with fibro and louvres.

=== Further information ===
==== Other structures ====
Located within the curtilage are various other 20th Century subsidiary structures, that have not been assessed as part of this listing. These include:

- Carport/Gangshed – clad in sheet metal (Down side)
- Section Hut – concrete drop-slab x 2 (Down side)
- Decant Pump Shelter (Down side)
- Possible Traction-section Hut (south of barracks)
- Cleaners Amenities Building (north of barracks).

== Transport links ==
As of 2026, NSW Trainlink operates coach services to Bathurst and Katoomba from Mount Victoria.

== Heritage listing ==
Mount Victoria Railway Station Group is of state significance as a large complex of buildings illustrating clearly the pattern of development of railway facilities in the Blue Mountains area. It is the most substantial railway station complex in the Blue Mountains and indicates the former importance of the location with the former locomotive depot (now demolished) to service terminating trains for railway tourism associated with Jenolan Caves and handling goods trains over the steep grades of the Blue Mountains, particularly the section to Lithgow. The structures indicate the importance of Mount Victoria as a health and holiday resort, the RRR accommodation provided in the station building reinforcing this.

The Mount Victoria Railway Station Group has a high degree of research potential for its ability to demonstrate construction techniques and architectural character of various types of buildings in one station. The station is a fine example of railway architecture including Victorian Regency and Federation buildings and is an important landmark in the townscape of Mt Victoria being located at the lower end of the town at the termination of the main street vista. The Mount Victoria Railway barracks is an unusual surviving example of a purpose-built rest-house still used by the railways for staff accommodation. The signal box is one of a few examples of brick on platform elevated signal boxes that remain in operation in the state. The footbridge is rare as an intact example of a standard Warren Truss trestle and stairway with channel iron stair stringers. The overall aesthetic character of the station is further enhanced by the setting of the station within the rock escarpment, a typical natural setting of the Blue Mountains stations, featuring a collection of numerous flora ranging from mature trees, shrubs and potted plants along both platforms.

The Mount Victoria Railway Station is associated with John Whitton, Engineer-in-Chief of the NSW Railways, as the original station building was built to a design from his time, and with George Cowdery, Engineer-in-Chief for Existing Lines, as the two-level stone addition containing the Railway Refreshment Room was built under his supervision.

Mount Victoria railway station was listed on the New South Wales State Heritage Register on 2 April 1999 having satisfied the following criteria.

The place is important in demonstrating the course, or pattern, of cultural or natural history in New South Wales.

The historical importance of Mount Victoria Railway Station Group as a railway location is demonstrated by a variety of high quality buildings which clearly show the development of the Station over time, particularly between 1872 and 1912, illustrating clearly the growth and decline of railway facilities in the Blue Mountains area. Mt Victoria was a convenient place to construct a locomotive facility (now demolished) to service terminating trains to serve railway tourism associated with the Jenolan Caves and handling goods trains over the steep grades of the Blue Mountains, particularly the section to Lithgow. The structures indicate the importance of Mt Victoria as a health and holiday resort, the Railway Refreshment Rooms and accommodation provided in the station building reinforcing this. The Mount Victoria Railway Rest-House (Barracks) is associated with the duplication of the railway line over the Blue Mountains in 1910 and is significant for its continued use as accommodation. The Station Group is the most substantial railway station complex in the Blue Mountains, demonstrating clear layers of growth from its original construction as a terminus station, through its growth at the turn of the century to the duplication of the railway line.

The place has a strong or special association with a person, or group of persons, of importance of cultural or natural history of New South Wales's history.

The Mount Victoria Railway Station is associated with John Whitton, Engineer-in-Chief of the NSW Railways, as the original Station building was built to a design from his time, and with George Cowdery, Engineer-in-Chief for Existing Lines, as the two-level stone addition containing the Railway Refreshment Room was built under his supervision.

The place is important in demonstrating aesthetic characteristics and/or a high degree of creative or technical achievement in New South Wales.

The Mount Victoria Railway Station Group is of aesthetic significance for its cohesive group of Victorian Regency and Federation buildings and is an important landmark in the townscape of Mt Victoria, being located at the lower end of the town at the termination of the main street vista.

While contemporary with the majority of station buildings surviving on the Blue Mountains railway line, the Platform 1 building and adjoining lavatory building do not derive from the standard pattern used for those buildings as it has been built for a side platform rather than an island platform. It has high quality detailing with its brick detailing, clearstory window and use or roughcast render.

The signal box on Platform 2 is a representative example of its type, adapted to suit the side platform rather than the more typical island platform. It is a well detailed building designed and orientated to maximise views of the lines in each direction. The Mount Victoria barracks has a simple gabled form with wide verandahs and has been modified significantly yet still provides an example of a former rest-house facility established within close proximity of the railway line.

The overall aesthetic character of the station is further enhanced by the setting of the station within the rock escarpment, a typical natural setting of the Blue Mountains stations, featuring a collection of numerous flora ranging from mature trees, shrubs and potted plants along both platforms.

The place has a strong or special association with a particular community or cultural group in New South Wales for social, cultural or spiritual reasons.

The place has the potential to contribute to the local community's sense of place, and can provide a connection to the local community's past.

The place has potential to yield information that will contribute to an understanding of the cultural or natural history of New South Wales.

The Mount Victoria Railway Station Group has a high degree of research potential for its demonstrative ability in providing construction techniques and architectural character of various types of buildings in one station. The station building on Platform 2 is of particular research significance for its staged construction over time to accommodate different staff and passenger needs. The site of the former SM's cottage also has archaeological potential.

The place possesses uncommon, rare or endangered aspects of the cultural or natural history of New South Wales.

The Mount Victoria Station group is a rare Victorian era railway station combining a number of individually significant buildings and structures. The signal box is one of a few brick on platform signal boxes remaining in the state. The Railway Refreshment Rooms, though no longer used for their original purpose, are rare examples of such railway facility associated with the station's important location.

The barracks are relatively rare in the metro area (8 in 2009) though at least 37 remain in NSW. While of later construction it is representative of the late 1890s standard design of rest-house that provided accommodation to railway staff.

The footbridge is rare as an intact example of a standard Warren Truss trestles and stairway with Hardie Board long plank timber deck and channel iron stair stringers as almost all similar footbridges have been replaced with concrete.

The place is important in demonstrating the principal characteristics of a class of cultural or natural places/environments in New South Wales.

Mount Victoria Railway Station Group is a representative example of a substantial railway station complex combining various types, periods and styles of buildings dating from the 19th Century and early 20th Century, each individually representing their standard designs and types.

The footbridge is an intact representative example of a standard Warren Truss trestle footbridge with stairway, Hardie Board long plank timber deck and channel iron stair stringers. The barracks, although modified still demonstrates the key characteristics of standard accommodation for railway staff constructed during the early 20th Century.

== See also ==
List of railway stations in New South Wales
