= Blue Mountains Line =

Rail service in New South Wales, Australia

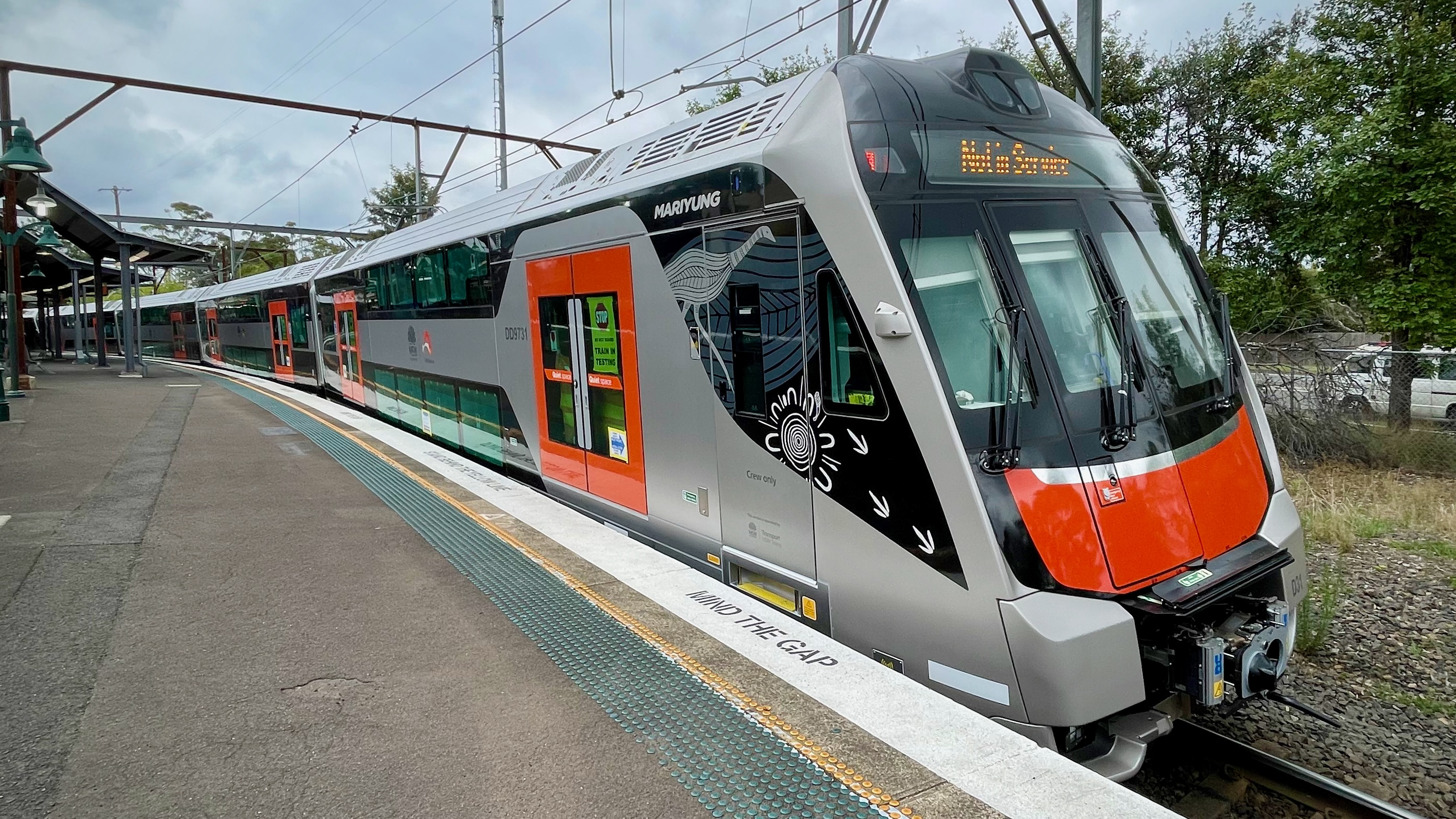
- A D set at Springwood

Overview
- Service type: Commuter rail
- Status: In operation
- Locale: Blue Mountains and Central West, New South Wales
- First service: 1868 (as part of the Main Western Line)
- Current operator: Sydney Trains
- Former operators: State Rail Authority, CityRail, NSW TrainLink
- Ridership: 10,154,000 passengers in 2019
- Website: transportnsw.info/routes/details/trainlink/bmt/02bmt

Route
- Termini: Central; Bathurst
- Stops: 21
- Distance travelled: 228.7 km
- Average journey time: 2 hours 55 minutes (to Bathurst)
- Line used: Main Western

Technical
- Rolling stock: D set Mariyung (electric services) Endeavour Railcar (non-electric services)
- Track gauge: 1,435 mm (4 ft 8 1/2 in) standard gauge
- Electrification: 1957 (to Lithgow)
- Track owner: Transport Asset Manager of New South Wales
- Timetable number: BMT
Route map
Sydney Trains intercity services
- Blue Mountains
- Central Coast & Newcastle
- Hunter
- South Coast
- Southern Highlands

The Blue Mountains Line (BMT) is an intercity rail service serving the Blue Mountains and Central West regions of New South Wales, Australia. The line travels west from Sydney to the major town of Katoomba and on to Mount Victoria, Lithgow and Bathurst. Mount Victoria is the terminus for most electric services, but some services terminate at Lithgow instead. Two express services per day in each direction, known as the Bathurst Bullet, extend to the regional city of Bathurst, which is supplemented by road coaches connecting Bathurst to Lithgow. Due to electrification limits at Lithgow, the Bathurst Bullet is run using the Endeavour railcars, which operate on diesel. The Blue Mountains Line operates over a mostly duplicated section of the Main Western line. As such, the tracks are also traversed by the Central West XPT, Outback Xplorer and Indian Pacific passenger services and by freight trains.

== History ==
The Blue Mountains line is a section of the Main Western line which opened in 1868. The line was built with gradients as steep as 1 in 33 (3%) and curves as sharp as 8 chains (160 m; 530 ft). Most of the curves were eased to 12 chains (240 m; 790 ft) with duplication.

The line originally ascended the eastern and descended the western sides of the Blue Mountains via a series of zig-zag track sections. The eastern zig zag was by passed by a tunnel in 1892 and the western zig zag (currently a tourist railway) was bypassed in 1910 with the Ten Tunnels Deviation.

=== Electrification and further upgrades ===
In the 1950s, the line was electrified primarily as a means of easing the haulage of coal freight from the western coalfields to the coastal ports, but a by-product of this programme was the introduction of electric interurban passenger services as far west as Bowenfels, later cut back to Lithgow. Goods trains are now exclusively diesel hauled. Electric passenger services were originally provided by a combination of electric locomotive hauled carriages and single deck electric multiple unit sets (known as U sets), both of which have now been withdrawn and replaced by more modern rolling stock.

In June 2012, New South Wales Premier Barry O'Farrell announced that services would be extended to Bathurst. The service, commonly known as the Bathurst Bullet, commenced on 21 October 2012. A second Bathurst Bullet return service was introduced on 16 September 2019. Springwood services were previously the only services where an H set train would be scheduled. Due to the width of H sets, they risked striking platforms past Springwood with their outward opening plug doors and tunnels past Katoomba. The last H sets were removed from the line in 2017 and 2018, but they are still used as a replacement train.

Due to the increased width of the New South Wales D set compared with its predecessor, the V sets the loading gauge of the line past Springwood was increased. This was done by a combination of carving notches into tunnel walls and reducing required clearances by lowering speed limits. The New South Wales D set or Mariyung trains entered service on the line on 13 October 2025.

Station upgrades as part of the Transport Access Program (TAP) were carried out, as well as more minor upgrades. A full list of completed upgrades can be viewed at the TAP's completed projects page, whilst current projects can be viewed here.

Station upgrades for the Blue Mountains Line (Information accurate as of March 2024)
Station	Upgrade details	Upgrade status	Year completed	Notes
Lapstone	New lift, new toilets, general station refresh, upgrades to footbridge and ramp, and new kiss and ride bay.	Complete	April 2021	
Glenbrook	New lift, new kiss and ride bay, general station refresh, and new bathrooms.	Complete	December 2019	
Faulconbridge	New lifts, new toilets, general station refresh, upgrades to ramp, accessible car space and kiss and ride bay.	Complete	April 2021	
Hazelbrook	New toilet, new lift, upgrades to pathways and accessible parking spaces.	Complete	December 2019	
Wentworth Falls	New lifts, new canopies, new kiss and ride bays, improved forecourt, improvements to toilets and waiting areas.	Complete	December 2017	
Leura	New lift and stairs, new canopy, new taxi rank, new pathway, general station refresh, new kiss and ride bay, and new bicycle facilities.	Complete	February 2018	
Katoomba	New commuter carpark and new accessible parking spaces.	Complete	July 2010	
Katoomba	Platform extension as part of new fleet program, as well as modifications to canopies and platform edges.	Complete	July 2020	
Blackheath	New lifts, upgrades to taxi rank, kiss and ride bay, accessible parking spaces, general station and platform refresh, new water fountain, removal of pedestrian level crossing, and new bicycle hoops.	Complete	August 2023	
Mount Victoria	Platform extension as part of new fleet program, as well as modifications to canopies and platform edges.	Complete	July 2020	
Lithgow	Platform extension as part of new fleet program, as well as modifications to canopies and platform edges.	Complete	July 2020	

== Services ==
All electric Blue Mountains line services start and terminate from the intercity platforms (4–14) of Central (Sydney Terminal) station. During the weekday off-peak, they operate hourly, alternating between services to Mount Victoria and Lithgow. During the morning and afternoon peaks, some express services operate, together with short workings to Springwood and Katoomba.

There are two daily services each way between Bathurst to Central, known as the Bathurst Bullet, mainly catering for commuters working in Sydney. Two services run toward Central in the morning and return in the afternoon. Two shuttle services operate from Lithgow to Bathurst in the early morning and return to Lithgow late at night. Some off-peak electric interurban services on the line only consist of four carriages, with peak hour services usually consisting of eight carriages. Regional diesel services on the line consist of two carriages.

== Rolling stock ==
- Endeavour Railcar 2 car DMUs — (Central–Bathurst services)
- D set 4 or 8 car EMUs — (Central to Springwood, Katoomba, Mount Victoria or Lithgow)
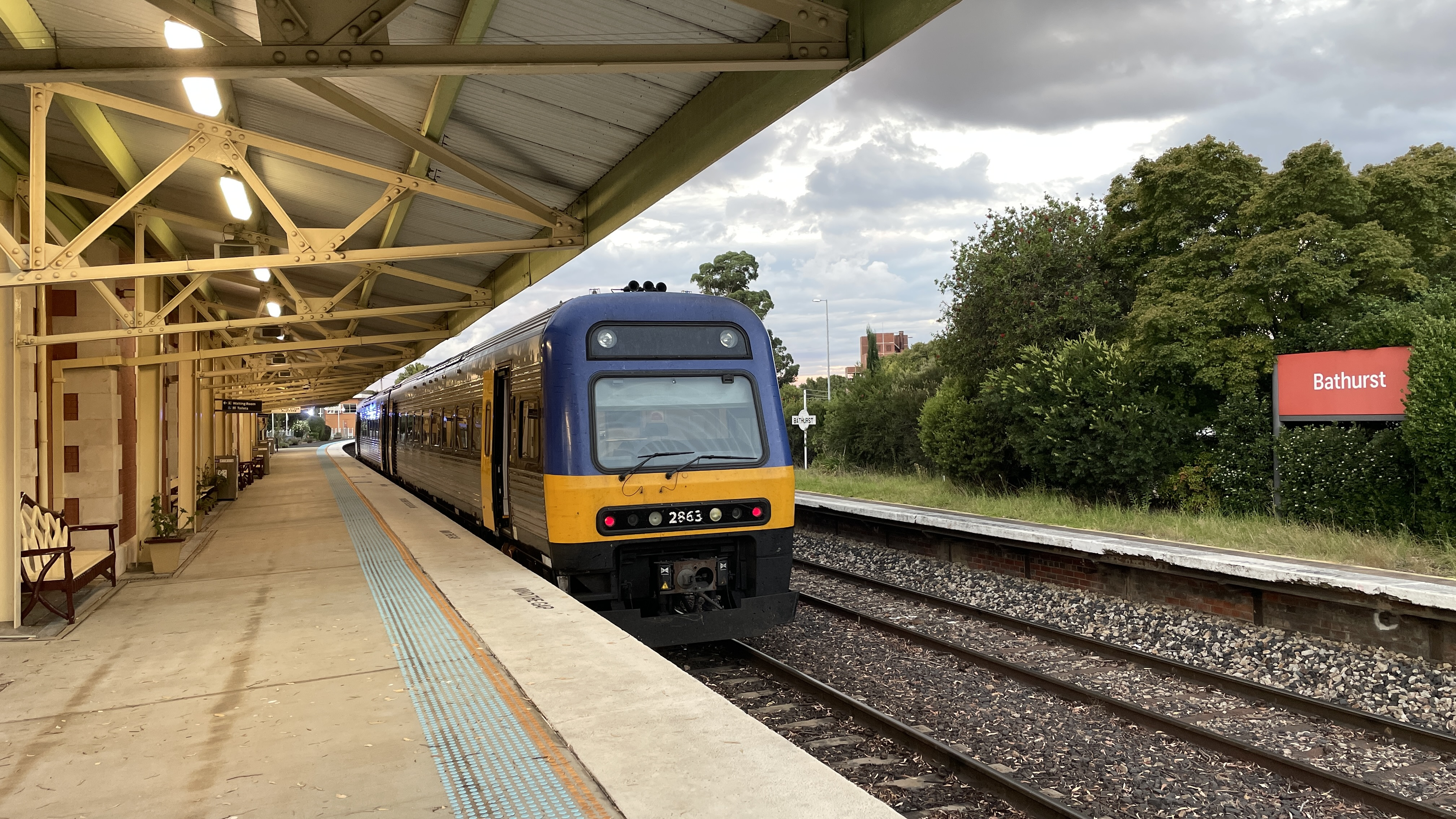
Endeavour railcar

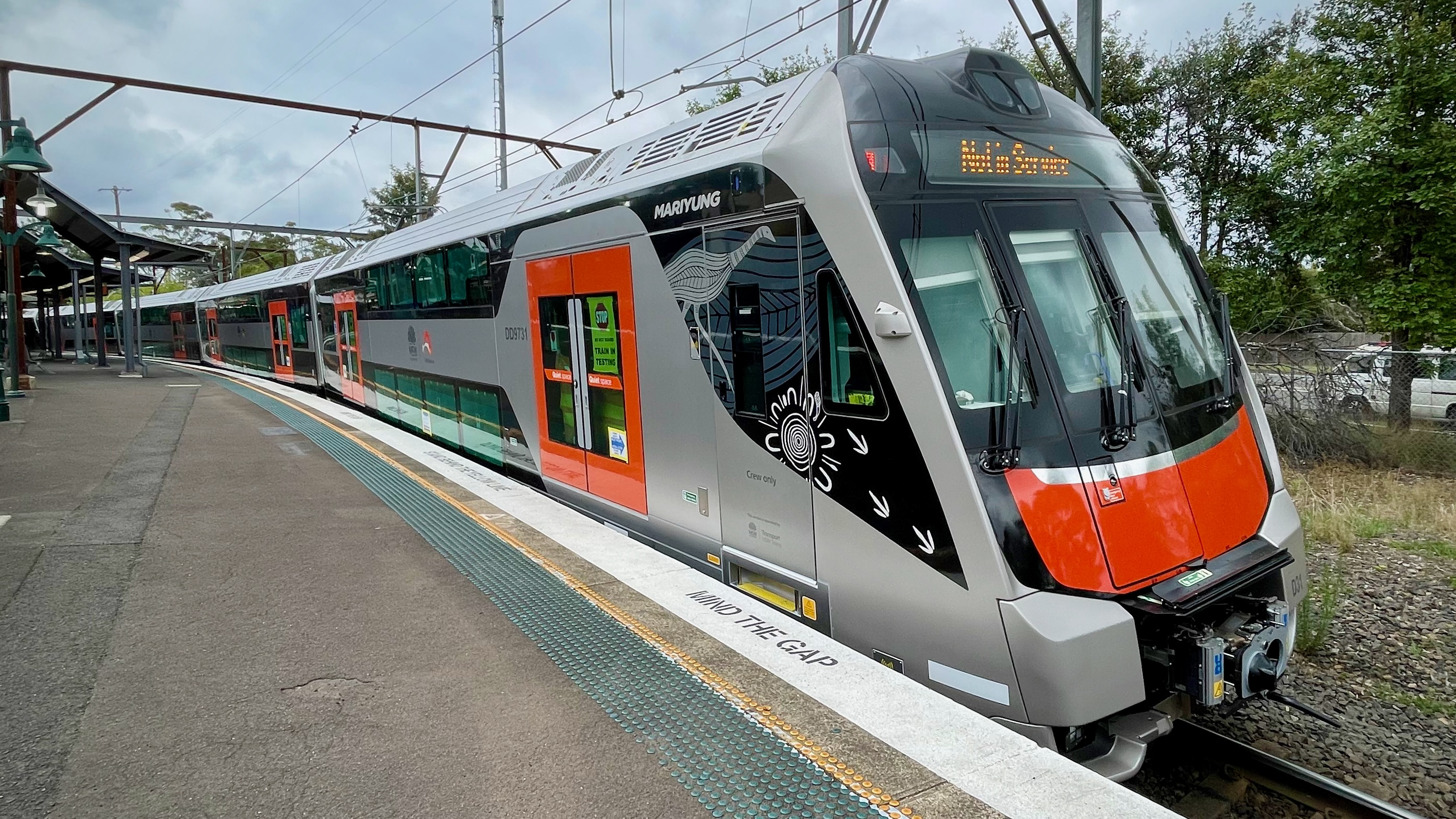
D set

== Patronage ==
The following table shows the patronage of each line of the NSW TrainLink Intercity network for the year ending 30 June 2026, based on Opal tap on and tap off data.

2025–26 NSW TrainLink Intercity patronage by line
Blue Mountains Line	6,634,999
Central Coast & Newcastle Line	12,765,284
Hunter Line	839,041
South Coast Line	7,445,930
Southern Highlands Line	553,390
