= Blackheath, New South Wales =

Blackheath
- Suburb
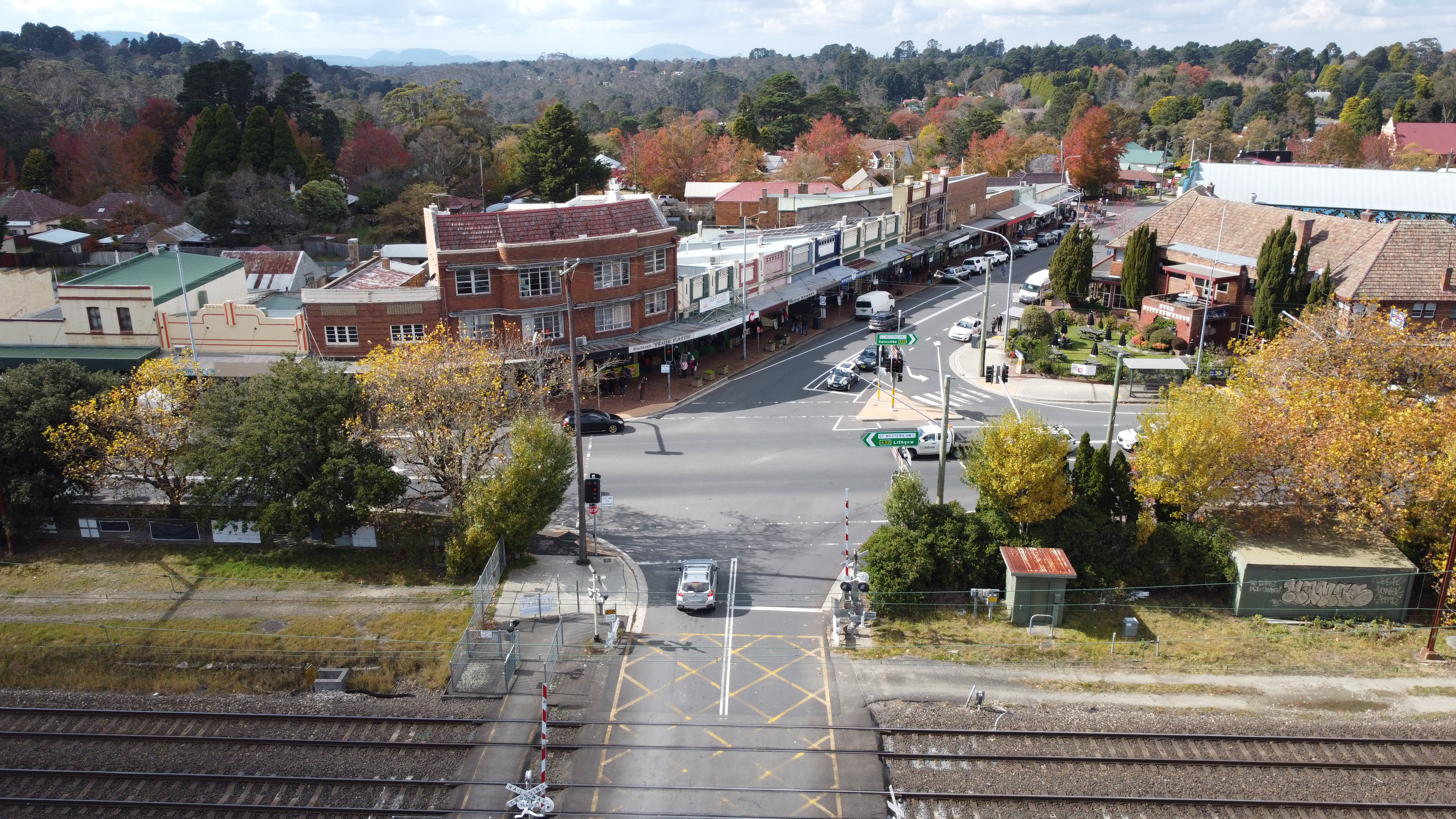
- Town centre

- Interactive map of Blackheath
- Coordinates: 33°38′02″S 150°17′05″E
- Country: Australia
- State: New South Wales
- LGA: City of Blue Mountains
- Location: 120 km (75 mi) West-NW of Sydney CBD; 11 km (6.8 mi) NW of Katoomba; 30 km (19 mi) SE of Lithgow
- Established: 1815

Government
  - State electorate: Blue Mountains
  - Federal division: Macquarie
- Elevation: 1,066 m (3,497 ft)

Population
  - Total: 4,479 (2021 census)
- Postcode: 2785
- Mean max temp: 17.2 °C (63.0 °F)
- Mean min temp: 8.1 °C (46.6 °F)
- Annual rainfall: 966.6 mm (38.06 in)
Suburbs around Blackheath
Mount Victoria	Blue Mountains National Park	Blue Mountains National Park
Megalong Valley	Blackheath	Blue Mountains National Park
Megalong Valley	Medlow Bath	Blue Mountains National Park

Blackheath (postcode: 2785) is a town located near the highest point of the Blue Mountains, between Katoomba and Mount Victoria in New South Wales, Australia. The town's altitude is about 1,065 m (3,494 ft) AHD and it is located about 120 km (75 mi) west north-west of Sydney, 11 km (6.8 mi) north-west of Katoomba, and about 30 km (19 mi) south-east of Lithgow.

Blackheath has a vibrant artistic community and hosts two monthly markets – the Blackheath Growers Market and The Blackheath Community Market, as well as annual Christmas markets, antique markets and bimonthly craft markets. The town has many community activities, such as the Blackheath Philosophy Forum, which was founded in 2002 to arrange public discussion forums on philosophy and related topics.

As Blackheath has grown, more shops have appeared. Various shops from the late 1800s still stand in Blackheath.

== History ==
The surrounding areas of Blackheath were thought to be a summer corroboree meeting place for peoples of the Darug, Gundungurra and Wiradjuri nations.

Following European settlement of Australia, the site was originally named Hounslow. After crossing the Blue Mountains in 1815 and returning from Bathurst, Governor Lachlan Macquarie renamed the settlement as "Black-Heath", in reference to the colour and texture of the native shrubbery in the area. Macquarie recorded in his journal:

"This place having a black wild appearance I have this day named it Black-Heath."

The first building in Blackheath, the "Scotch Thistle Inn", was erected by Andrew Gardner in 1831 and Charles Darwin visited the inn in 1836. The extent of the original grant of land to Gardner can be seen today as the area bound by the Great Western Highway, Govetts Leap Road and (the misspelt) Gardiners Crescent.

In 1844 a convict road-gang of some 130 convicts and over 40 military personnel under Captain John Bull was moved to Blackheath. The convict stockade operated until 1 April 1849 when work on The Western Road to Bathurst moved further west. The convicts were transferred to Cockatoo Island in Sydney Harbour. The Blackheath convict stockade is the last convict stockade in NSW.

Blackheath developed into a town after the Main Western railway line was built in 1869; the current station location was completed in 1883. A large dam built to supply water for railway steam engines became the public baths well before steam operations ceased upon electrification. The baths opened for public swimming in 1931 and since then have been redeveloped to include swimming pools, children's play facilities and surrounding park lands. Blackheath's original post office opened in 1910 and has now been converted into a clothing shop.

Blackheath's sporting claim to fame is that Don Bradman hit a century off three overs for the Blackheath team in November 1931 at Blackheath Oval in a social match against Lithgow. He went on to make 256. Blackheath Oval is now home to the Blackheath Cricket Team.

== Heritage listings ==
Blackheath has a number of heritage listed sites, including:

- Blue Mountains National Park: Blue Mountains walking tracks
- Main Western railway: Blackheath railway station

== People ==
Historical population
Year	Pop.	±%
1921	2,182	—
1933	1,427	−34.6%
1947	2,349	+64.6%
1954		—
1961		—
1966	2,077	—
1971	2,228	+7.3%
1976	2,371	+6.4%
1981	3,027	+27.7%
1986	3,599	+18.9%
1991	3,749	+4.2%
1996	4,119	+9.9%
2001	4,047	−1.7%
2006	4,177	+3.2%
2011	4,353	+4.2%
2016	4,265	−2.0%
2021	4,479	+5.0%
Source: Australian Bureau of Statistics data.

At the 2021 census, Blackheath had a population of 4,479 people. Of these:

- Age distribution: The residents' median age was 53 years, which is fifteen years older than the national median age of 38. Children aged under 15 years made up 13.6% of the population (national average is 18.2%) and people aged 65 years and over made up 29.9% of the population (national average is 17.2%).
- Ethnic diversity: 73.0% of people were born in Australia. The next most common country of birth was England at 6.9%. 87.8% of people only spoke English at home.
- Finances: The median household weekly income was $1,322, compared to the national median of $1,746. This difference is also reflected in real estate, with the median mortgage payment being $1,842 per month, compared to the national median of $1,721.
- Housing: Of occupied private dwellings in Blackheath, 96.2% were separate houses. The average household size was 2.0 people.
- Religion: The most common responses for religion were No Religion 51.9%, Anglican 11.5% and Catholic 12.7%.

== Local attractions ==
=== Govetts Leap ===
From Blackheath town centre, a short drive to the east-north-east takes visitors to Govetts Leap, a lookout with views of the Grose Valley and nearby waterfalls. The fall is named after William Romaine Govett, an assistant to the Surveyor General at the time, who first came upon the falls in June 1831. The name 'leap' is an old Scottish word meaning waterfall or cascade.

=== Kanimbla Valley ===
West of Blackheath is the Kanimbla Valley surrounded by rolling hills, lush farmland, hobby farms and residential properties.

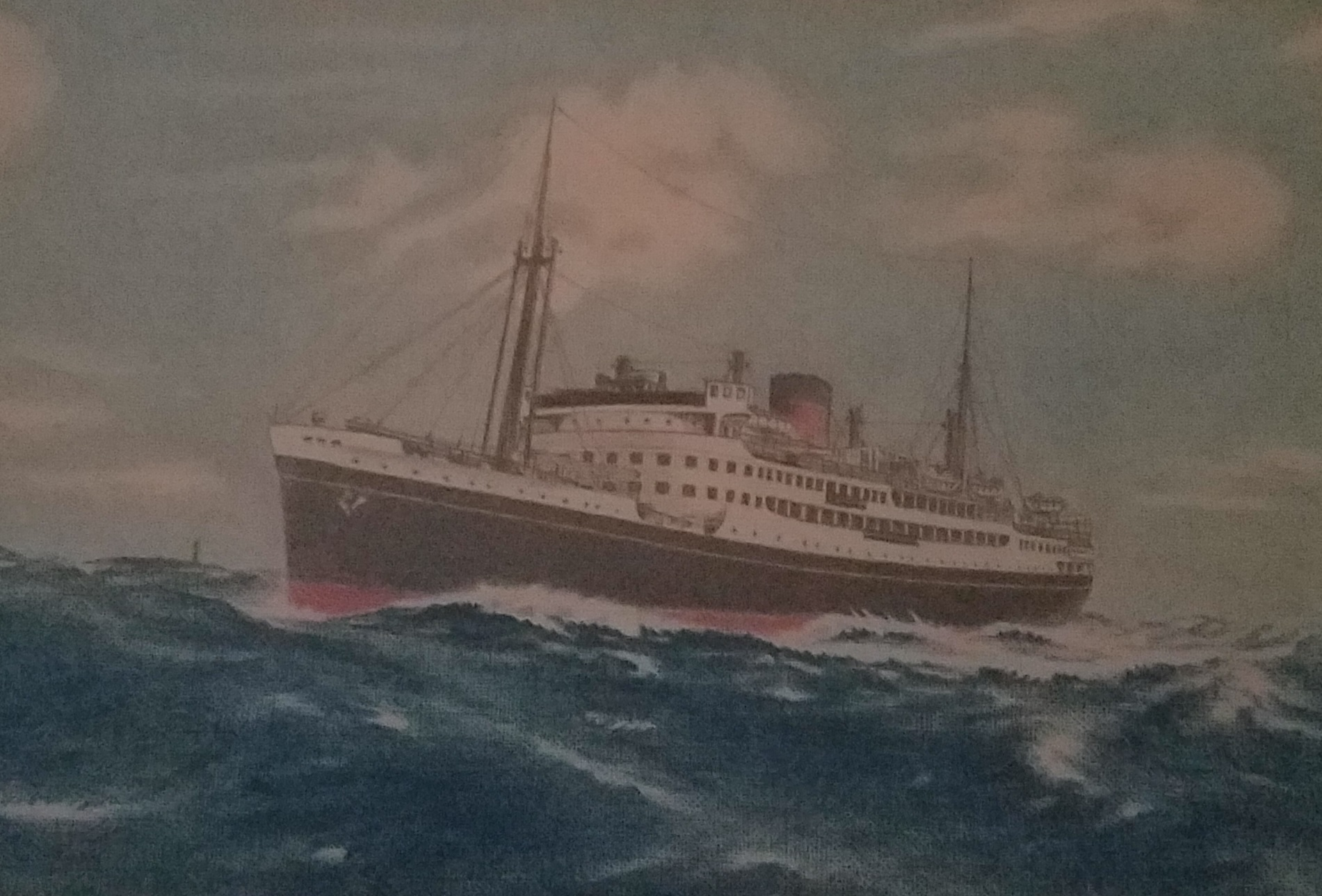
MV Kanimbla off Gabo Island 16 June 1937

The ship HMAS Kanimbla (C78) was named after this region.

=== Evans Lookout ===
Evans Lookout provides an alternate vantage point for views, also into Grose Valley.

=== Other lookouts, walking tracks and attractions ===
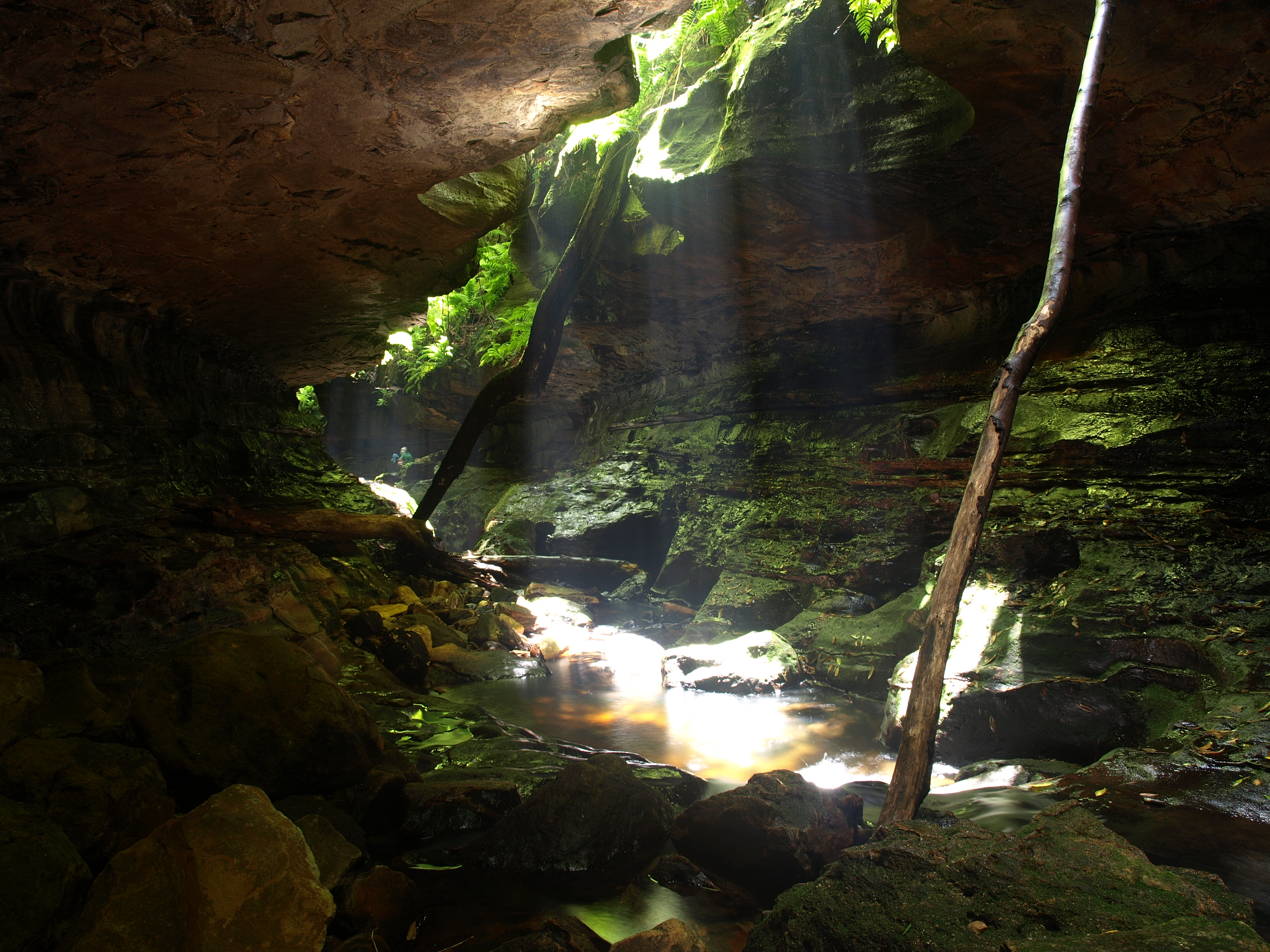
Inside the slot of the Grand Canyon at Blackheath in the Blue Mountains west of Sydney. Note the canyoner in the far end of the slot.

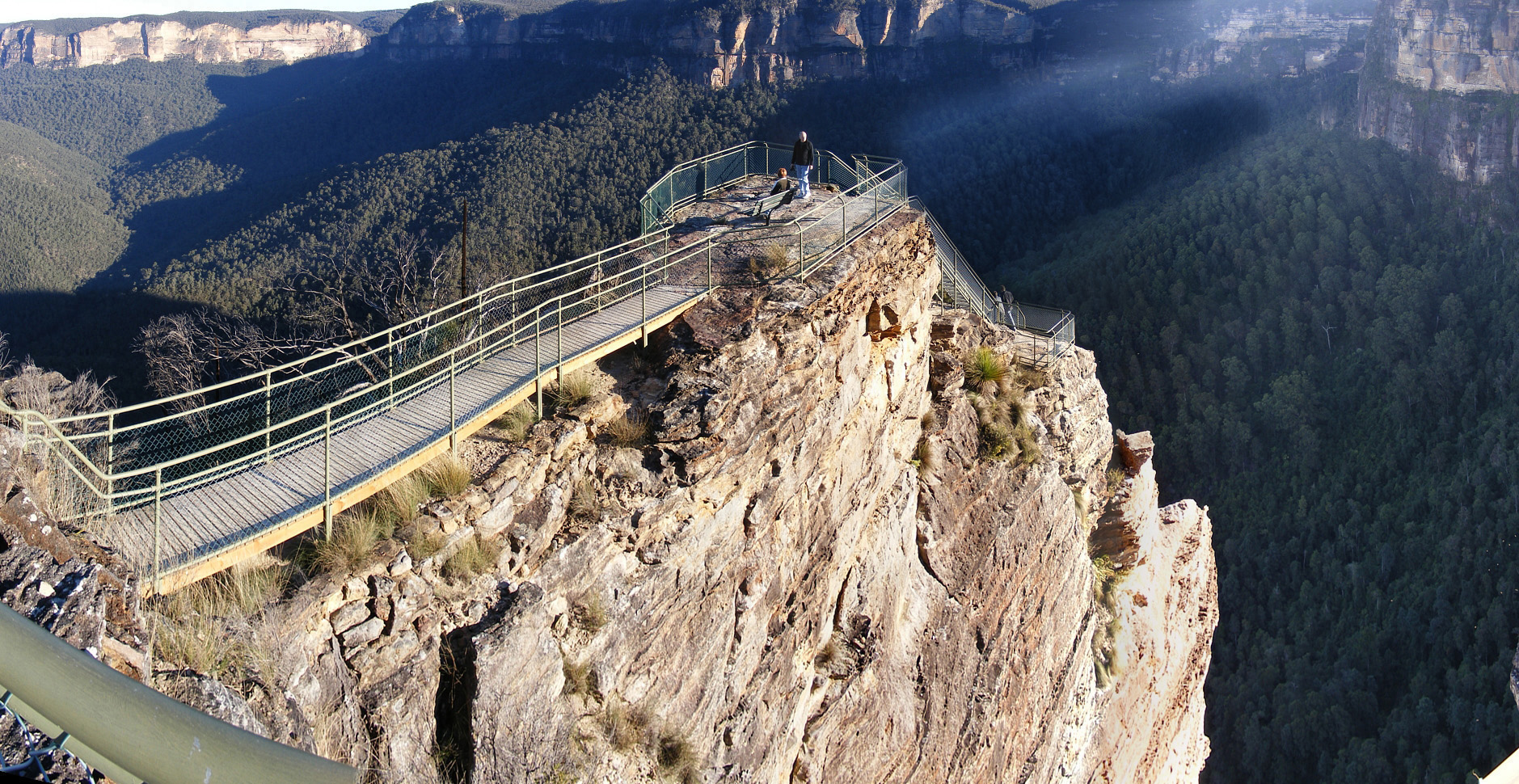
Pulpit rock

Pulpit Rock, Perrys Lookdown, and Anvil Rock are other lookouts to the north-northeast of the town centre, off Hat Hill Road. There are several walking tracks starting from the lookouts, including short walks to enjoy different views, longer half and whole day walks, and walks involving camping overnight or several days' walk. Canyoners and rockclimbers also base themselves at Blackheath for activities in the surrounding national park. The Blue Gum Forest may be accessed from Perrys Lookdown.

The area is known today for its colourful blooms in Spring and golden Autumn foliage as the weather begins to cool. In September, daffodils bloom, and on the first weekend of November, Blackheath hosts an annual Rhododendron Festival.

The Campbell Rhododendron Gardens are located north-north-east of the town centre, in Bachante Street. The 18.5-hectare (46-acre) gardens comprise rhododendrons/azaleas planted underneath a native Australian bush canopy tended by the volunteers of The Blue Mountains Rhododendron Society of NSW.

The ornamental cherry trees that line the streets are usually in full bloom in the first week of October.

Mount Boyce lookout is located northwest of Blackheath, towards Lithgow. The Megalong Valley can be accessed from Blackheath, about 18 km (11 mi) away to the west, via Mount Victoria.

Blackheath has a number of cafés and restaurants, a large antique centre, and other shops. It is a common destination for people from Sydney for a weekend excursion or a Sunday drive. Due to the climate, Blackheath is a popular destination for Christmas in July.

== Rhododendron Festival ==
One of Blackheath's main festivals and celebrations is the Rhododendron Festival, commonly known as the "Rhodo" Festival. Occurring on the first Sunday of November, the festival commemorates the flowering of the Rhododendron Tree, a species commonly planted throughout Blackheath by European settlers, especially in the Blackheath Soldiers Memorial Park and the Campbell Rhododendron Gardens The festival includes a parade, as well as stalls from local businesses. The date also coincides with the opening weekend of the Blackheath Pool.

== Transport ==
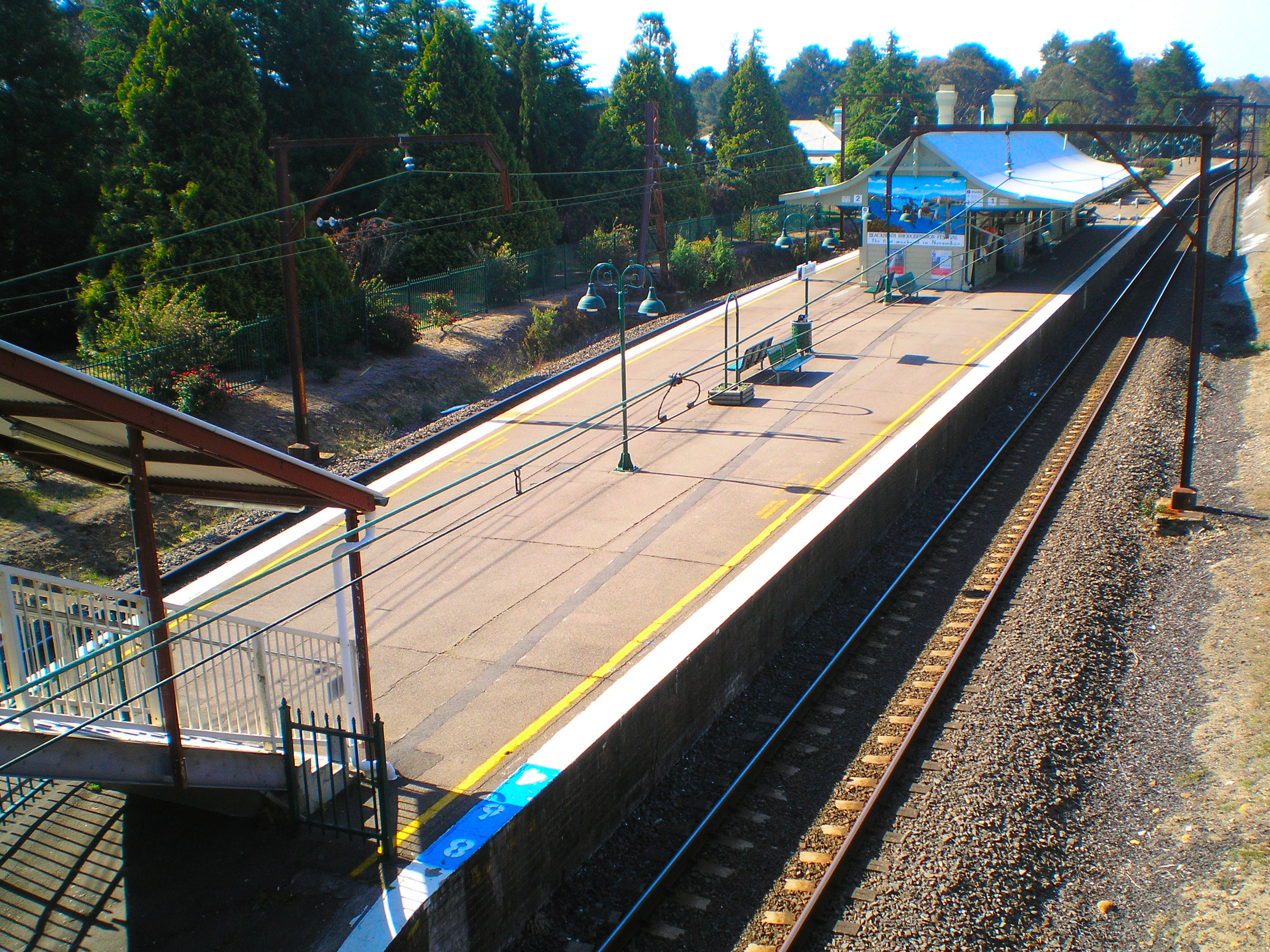
Blackheath railway station

Blackheath was connected to the Main Western railway line in 1869, and the town is now served by the Blackheath railway station located on the Blue Mountains Line.

The Great Western Highway is the main road access route, through the town's main business district. To the northwest of Blackheath, at Mount Victoria, the Darling Causeway connects the Great Western Highway to the Bells Line of Road at Bell. Several proposals have been investigated for upgrading the Great Western Highway west of Blackheath as a tunnel. As of 2024, the tunnel project has been indefinitely shelved.

On the day of the 2016 Census, the most common methods of travel to work for employed people were: Car, as driver 56.6%, Worked at home 12.7% and Train 5.4%.

Blue Mountains Transit operates two bus routes through the suburb of Blackheath:

- 698: Katoomba to Blackheath
- 698V: Katoomba to Mount Victoria

== Wildlife ==
A large amount of wildlife inhabit in and around Blackheath. Mammals such as the eastern grey kangaroo and echidna live in the forests around Blackheath.

Rare bird species also occur, such as the lesser sooty owl and regent honeyeater.

== Geography and climate ==
2025 autumn foliage in Blcakheath

The area around Blackheath has views over the Grose Valley from Evans Lookout and Govetts Leap in the east, and the vista of the Megalong Valley from Hargraves Lookout in the west, past the small hamlet of Shipley.

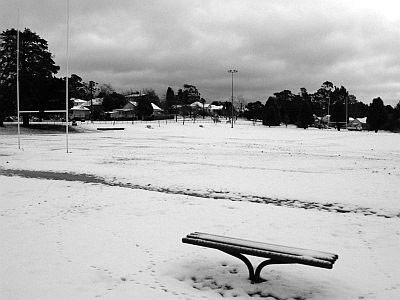
Blackheath Oval under snow, early morning, June 2007

As the highest town in the Blue Mountains, Blackheath receives snow in winter (two settled falls per season is the average with another five to ten days of light snow showers) and even in summer the temperatures are generally mild in comparison to other locations at the same latitude. Average maximum temperature in winter is around 9 to 10 °C (48 to 50 °F) although some days struggle to get above 5 to 6 °C (41 to 43 °F). Frosts are fairly common but not as common or strong as frosts on the Oberon Plateau or in places further west, like Bathurst and Orange. Local topography tends to keep minimum temperatures in the −3 to 5 °C (27 to 41 °F) range as the coldest air during radiative cooling (clear, calm nights) drains into the valleys.

In summer, average maximum temperatures are around 23 °C (73 °F) but temperatures occasionally peak at 30 °C (86 °F) on some days during mid-summer and can also drop to the mid teens, or lower, during southerly changes or when onshore troughs persist on the east coast. Minimum temperatures in summer are typically around 10 to 15 °C (50 to 59 °F) but minimums in single figures also occur, more commonly in December. In December 2011, a minimum of 2.4 °C (36.3 °F) was recorded.

Blackheath's location on a high ridge makes it vulnerable to strong and sometimes destructive winds, especially in the winter months when cold fronts surge up from the Southern Ocean, producing land gales. On 5 July 2011 a strong cold front passed over the area that produced winds that officially gusted up to 139 km/h (86 mph), causing many trees to be uprooted and extensive damage to some property. The Venturi effect, where airflow is constricted by vertical cliffs and deep valleys, would probably have produced winds notably stronger than this in vulnerable locations in town and nearby. Land gales are more likely to occur from around April to November but vary in their intensity from year to year. Spring and summer storms can also produce fresh to strong winds, typically in the range of 70 to 90 km/h (43 to 56 mph).

Blackheath can also be prone to fogs and thunderstorms, although this varies notably from year to year. Some days in summer are quite humid, allowing for moisture to build during the day, sometimes creating severe storms that can last for hours. The most common cause for quite frequent spring/summer thunderstorms in and around Blackheath is related to the early, mid morning heating of the lower atmosphere, due to the town's elevation.

Blackheath is surrounded by the Blue Mountains National Park which is prone to bushfires. In November 2006 severe bushfires threatened Blackheath from the north.

Blackheath experiences a subtropical highland climate with monthly average temperatures not falling below −3 °C (27 °F) and not exceeding 25 °C (77 °F). Blackheath's average annual precipitation is just over 1,000 mm (39 in).

Climate data for Mount Boyce AWS (1990–2020); 1,080 m AMSL; 33.62° S, 150.27° E
Month	Jan	Feb	Mar	Apr	May	Jun	Jul	Aug	Sep	Oct	Nov	Dec	Year
Record high °C (°F)	38.0 (100.4)	38.0 (100.4)	32.5 (90.5)	27.9 (82.2)	26.3 (79.3)	23.0 (73.4)	17.4 (63.3)	20.7 (69.3)	27.6 (81.7)	29.3 (84.7)	35.5 (95.9)	37.5 (99.5)	38.0 (100.4)
Mean daily maximum °C (°F)	24.4 (75.9)	23.0 (73.4)	20.6 (69.1)	17.3 (63.1)	13.6 (56.5)	10.1 (50.2)	9.6 (49.3)	11.3 (52.3)	14.8 (58.6)	17.9 (64.2)	20.4 (68.7)	22.8 (73.0)	17.2 (62.9)
Mean daily minimum °C (°F)	13.5 (56.3)	13.2 (55.8)	11.4 (52.5)	8.8 (47.8)	6.1 (43.0)	3.8 (38.8)	2.6 (36.7)	3.0 (37.4)	5.4 (41.7)	7.7 (45.9)	9.8 (49.6)	11.7 (53.1)	8.1 (46.5)
Record low °C (°F)	4.5 (40.1)	3.8 (38.8)	2.9 (37.2)	−0.9 (30.4)	−2.2 (28.0)	−3.0 (26.6)	−3.4 (25.9)	−3.6 (25.5)	−3.6 (25.5)	−1.5 (29.3)	0.2 (32.4)	2.4 (36.3)	−3.6 (25.5)
Average precipitation mm (inches)	118.1 (4.65)	138.6 (5.46)	117.5 (4.63)	63.9 (2.52)	52.1 (2.05)	77.7 (3.06)	41.4 (1.63)	53.8 (2.12)	54.6 (2.15)	67.7 (2.67)	99.8 (3.93)	81.4 (3.20)	966.6 (38.07)
Average precipitation days	16.1	16.2	17.0	14.4	12.6	15.0	14.2	11.9	11.3	13.5	16.5	16.2	174.9
Average afternoon relative humidity (%)	58	66	65	63	69	72	69	59	56	54	61	57	62
