= List of Blue Mountains subjects =

This is a list of articles about the Blue Mountains in New South Wales, Australia.

== A ==
- Aboriginal sites of New South Wales (includes Blue Mountains)

== B ==
- Bargo River
- Barrallier, Francis
- Bell railway station, New South Wales
- Bell, New South Wales
- Bells Line of Road
- Berambing, New South Wales
- Bilpin, New South Wales
- Blackheath railway station, New South Wales
- Blackheath, New South Wales
- Blaxland railway station
- Blaxland, Gregory
- Blaxland, New South Wales
- Blue Gum Forest
- Blue Labyrinth (New South Wales)
- Blue Mountains Botanic Garden
- Blue Mountains Conservation Society
- Blue Mountains Dams
- Blue Mountains electoral district
- Blue Mountains Family History Society Inc
- Blue Mountains National Park
- Blue Mountains (New South Wales)
- Blue Mountains railway line
- Blue Mountains tree frog
- Bruce's Walk
- Bullaburra railway station
- Bullaburra, New South Wales
- Burra-Moko Head Sandstone

== C ==
- Caley, George
- Capertee River
- Cascade Dams
- Colo River
- City of Blue Mountains
- Clarence, New South Wales
- Clarence Tunnel
- Cox, William
- Coxs River

== D ==
- Darug

== E ==
- Echo Point (lookout)
- Evans, George
- Evans Lookout
- Everglades Gardens
- Explorers tree

== F ==
- Faulconbridge railway station
- Faulconbridge, New South Wales

== G ==
- Gandangara
- Gardens of Stone National Park
- Glenbrook, New South Wales
- Glenbrook rail accident
- Glenbrook railway station
- Glenbrook Tunnel (1892)
- Glenbrook Tunnel (1913)
- Glen Davis, New South Wales
- Glen Davis Shale Oil Works
- Govetts Leap Falls
- Greater Blue Mountains Area
- Greaves Creek Dam
- Grose River
- Grose Valley

== H ==
- Hartley, New South Wales
- Hartley Vale, New South Wales
- Hawkesbury Heights, New South Wales
- Hawkesbury River
- Hazelbrook railway station
- Hazelbrook, New South Wales
- Hollanders River
- Hydro Majestic Hotel

== J ==
- Jamison Valley
- Jenolan Caves
- Jenolan Caves Road
- Jenolan River
- Jooriland River

== K ==
- Kanangra-Boyd National Park
- Kanangra Creek
- Katoomba Cascade
- Katoomba Falls
- Katoomba railway station
- Katoomba, New South Wales
- Katoomba to Mittagong Trail
- Kedumba River
- Kedumba Valley
- Kings Tableland
- Kowmung River
- Knapsack Viaduct
- Kurrajong, New South Wales
- Kurrajong Heights, New South Wales

== L ==
- Lake Burragorang
- Lake Medlow
- Lapstone railway station
- Lapstone, New South Wales
- Lawson, William
- Lawson railway station
- Lawson, New South Wales
- Lennox Bridge, Glenbrook
- Leura railway station
- Leura, New South Wales
- Leuralla
- Lilianfels, Katoomba
- Linden railway station
- Linden, New South Wales
- List of mountain peaks of the Blue Mountains (New South Wales)
- Lithgow Blast Furnace
- Lithgow railway station
- Lithgow Small Arms Factory
- Lithgow Zig Zag
- Lithgow, New South Wales
- Little Hartley, New South Wales
- Little River (Oberon)
- Little River (Wollondilly)
- Locomotive Depot Heritage Museum

== M ==
- Macdonald River
- Medlow Bath railway station
- Medlow Bath, New South Wales
- Medlow Dam
- Megalong Valley
- Michael Eades Reserve
- Mount Banks
- Mount Bindo
- Mount Boyce
- Mount Hay, New South Wales
- Mount Irvine
- Mount Piddington
- Mount Riverview, New South Wales
- Mount Solitary
- Mount Trickett (New South Wales)
- Mount Victoria railway station
- Mount Victoria, New South Wales
- Mount Wilson, New South Wales
- Mount York
- Mountains Christian Academy

== N ==
- Narrow Neck Plateau
- Nattai National Park
- Nattai River
- Nepean River
- Newnes, New South Wales
- Newnes Glow Worm Tunnel
- Norman Lindsay Gallery and Museum (in Blue Mountains)

== P ==
- Parkes, Henry (lived in Blue Mountains)
- Perrys Lookdown
- Prime Ministers' Corridor of Oaks

== R ==
- Red Hands Cave
- Ruined Castle

== S ==
- Scenic World
- Shipley Plateau
- Six Foot Track
- Springwood, New South Wales
- Springwood High School
- Springwood railway station

== T ==
- The Blue Mountains (Elgar)
- Thirlmere Lakes National Park
- Three Sisters
- Tonalli River

== V ==
- Valley Heights Locomotive Depot Heritage Museum
- Valley Heights railway station
- Valley Heights Steam Tram Rolling Stock
- Valley Heights, New South Wales

== W ==
- Warrimoo railway station
- Warrimoo, New South Wales
- Wentworth, William Charles
- Wentworth Falls (waterfall)
- Wentworth Falls railway station
- Wentworth Falls, New South Wales
- Wingecarribee River
- Winmalee, New South Wales
- Winmalee High School
- Wolgan River
- Wolgan Valley
- Wollemi National Park
- Wollondilly River
- Woodford Creek Dam
- Woodford railway station
- Woodford, New South Wales

== Y ==
- Yellow Rock
- Yengo National Park
- Yerranderie, New South Wales

== Z ==
- Zig Zag Railway
