= Tuglow River =

Coordinates: 33°59′S 149°59′E

Tuglow

Location
- Country: Australia
- State: New South Wales
- Region: Sydney Basin (IBRA), Central Tablelands
- Local government area: Oberon

Physical characteristics
- Source: Great Dividing Range
  - location: Shooters Hill
  - elevation: 1,170 m (3,840 ft)
- Mouth: confluence with the Kowmung River
  - location: near the locality of Tuglow
  - elevation: 941 m (3,087 ft)
- Length: 22 km (14 mi)

Basin features
- River system: Hawkesbury-Nepean catchment
- National park: Nattai National Park

The Tuglow River, a perennial river that is part of the Hawkesbury-Nepean catchment, is located in the Central Tablelands region of New South Wales, Australia.

== Course and features ==
The Tuglow River rises on the eastern slopes of the Great Dividing Range south of Shooters Hill, and flows generally south southeast and then northeast, before reaching its confluence with the Kowmung River, near its junction with the Hollanders River. The river descends 229 metres (751 ft) over its 22-kilometre (14 mi) course.

In its lower reaches, the river adjoins Nattai National Park.

== See also ==
- List of rivers of Australia
- List of rivers of New South Wales (L–Z)
- Rivers of New South Wales
