= List of mountain peaks of the Blue Mountains (New South Wales) =

List of mountain peaks in the Greater Blue Mountains Area:

- Mount Boyce
- Mount Bindo
- Mount Trickett
- One Tree Hill
- Mount Piddington
- Mount York
- Mount Solitary
- Mount Banks
- Mount Stormbreaker
- Mount Hay, New South Wales
- Mount Cloudmaker
- Mount Wilson, New South Wales
- Mount Irvine
- Mount Tomah
