= HZK =

HZK may refer to:

- HZK, the IATA code for Húsavík Airport, Iceland
- HZK, the station code for Hazelbrook railway station, New South Wales, Australia
