= Hollanders River =

Coordinates: 33°59′S 149°59′E

Hollanders

Location
- Country: Australia
- State: New South Wales
- Region: Sydney Basin (IBRA), Central Tablelands
- Local government area: Oberon

Physical characteristics
- Source: Moorara Range, Great Dividing Range
  - location: Edith
  - elevation: 1,020 m (3,350 ft)
- Mouth: confluence with the Kowmung River
  - location: Shooters Hill
  - elevation: 939 m (3,081 ft)
- Length: 11 km (6.8 mi)

Basin features
- River system: Hawkesbury-Nepean catchment

The Hollanders River, a perennial river that is part of the Hawkesbury-Nepean catchment, is located in the Central Tablelands region of New South Wales, Australia.

== Course and features ==
The Hollanders River rises within the Moorara Range, on the eastern slopes of the Great Dividing Range southeast of Edith, and flows generally south by west before reaching its confluence with the Kowmung River, near its junction with the Tuglow River, southeast of Shooters Hill. The river descends 80 metres (260 ft) over its 11-kilometre (6.8 mi) course.

== See also ==
- List of rivers of Australia
- List of rivers of New South Wales (A–K)
- Rivers of New South Wales
