= Shooter's Hill (disambiguation) =

Shooter's Hill or Shooters Hill is district of South East London, England.

Shooter's Hill or Shooters Hill may also refer to:

- Shooter's Hill, part of the A207 road in Shooter's Hill, London
- Shooters Hill, New South Wales, Australia
- Shooters Hill, Jamaica, a settlement in Saint Andrew Parish, Jamaica
