= The Blue Mountains Times =

1931–1937 Australian newspaper

The Blue Mountains Times was an Australian newspaper from 1931 to 1937 that was based in Katoomba, New South Wales.

== History ==
The first issue of The Blue Mountains Times appeared on Friday, 16 October 1931. It circulated from Mount Victoria to Hazelbrook/Woodford and was printed and published at the office of Joseph Bennett & Son in Cascade Street, Katoomba, for Lorin Grant Christie. From August 1937 Ralph Bennett is listed as the proprietor. (Bennett says the paper was taken over by the management of The Katoomba Daily, Blue Mountains Newspapers Ltd., and soon closed.)

== Digitisation ==
The Blue Mountains Times has been digitised as part of the Australian Newspapers Digitisation Program project of the National Library of Australia.

== See also ==
- List of newspapers in New South Wales
- List of newspapers in Australia
