= Linden railway station =

Linden railway station may refer to:

- Linden railway station, New South Wales, on the Main Western line in Australia
- Linden railway station, Wellington, on the North Island Main Trunk Railway (NIMT) in Wellington, New Zealand
- Linden station (CTA), an 'L' station on the Purple Line in Wilmette, Illinois, United States
- Linden station (NJ Transit), on the Northeast Corridor in Linden, New Jersey, United States
