= Woodford railway station =

Railway station in New South Wales, Australia

Woodford
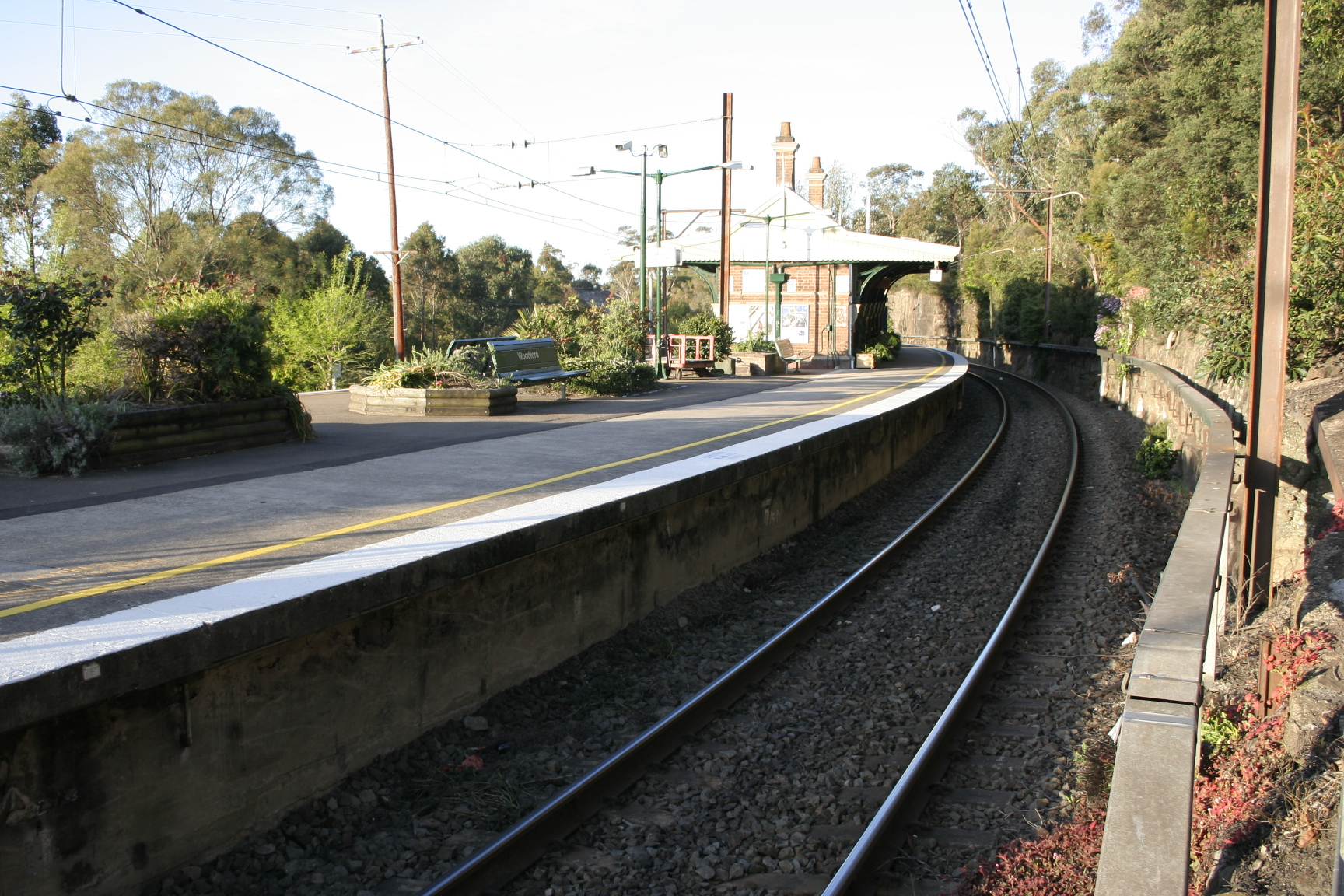
- Eastbound view of station platform and building, September 2007

General information
- Location: Railway Parade, Woodford; Australia
- Coordinates: 33°44′08″S 150°28′56″E
- Elevation: 603 metres (1,978 ft)
- Owner: Transport Asset Manager of New South Wales
- Operator: Sydney Trains
- Line: Main Western
- Distance: 90.37 kilometres (56.15 mi) from Central
- Platforms: 2 (1 island)
- Tracks: 2
- Connections: Bus

Construction
- Structure type: Ground

Other information
- Status: Weekdays: Staffed: 5.45am to 9.45am: Weekends and public holidays: Unstaffed
- Station code: WFO
- Website: Transport for NSW

History
- Opened: 11 July 1868
- Former names: Buss's Platform (1868–1871)

Passengers
- 2025: 35,819 (year); 98 (daily) (Sydney Trains, NSW TrainLink)

Services
Preceding station	Intercity Trains	Following station
Hazelbrook towards Lithgow	Blue Mountains Line	Linden towards Central
Location

Woodford railway station is a heritage-listed railway station located on the Main Western line in New South Wales, Australia. It serves the Blue Mountains village of Woodford opening on 11 July 1868 as Buss's Platform, being renamed Woodford on 1 June 1871.

== Platforms and services ==
Woodford has one island platform with two sides. It is serviced by Sydney Trains Blue Mountains Line services travelling from Sydney Central to Lithgow.

Platform	Line	Stopping pattern	Notes
1	BMT	services to Sydney Central	
2	BMT	services to Katoomba, Mount Victoria & Lithgow	

== Transport links ==
Blue Mountains Transit operates two bus routes via Woodford station, under contract to Transport for NSW:

- 685H: Springwood to Hazelbrook
- 690K: Springwood to Katoomba
