= Little River (Oberon) =

Coordinates: 33°46′S 150°08′E

Little

Location
- Country: Australia
- State: New South Wales
- Region: South Eastern Highlands (IBRA), Central Tablelands
- Local government area: Oberon

Physical characteristics
- Source: Mini Mini Range and Black Range
  - location: north of the Jenolan Caves
  - elevation: 1,000 m (3,300 ft)
- Mouth: confluence with the Coxs River
  - location: near Ironpot Mountain
  - elevation: 254 m (833 ft)
- Length: 16 km (9.9 mi)

Basin features
- River system: Hawkesbury-Nepean catchment
- National park: Blue Mountains, Kanangra-Boyd

The Little River, a perennial river that is part of the Hawkesbury-Nepean catchment, is located in the Central Tablelands region of New South Wales, Australia.

== Course and features ==
The Little River rises between the Mini Mini Range and Black Range within the Great Dividing Range, and flows generally east southeast, before reaching its confluence with the Coxs River on the south-western boundary of the Blue Mountains National Park, near Ironpot Mountain, within the Kanangra-Boyd National Park. The river descends 746 metres (2,448 ft) over its 16-kilometre (9.9 mi) course as it flows through the Jenolan State Forest.

== See also ==
- List of rivers of New South Wales (L–Z)
- List of rivers of Australia
- Rivers of New South Wales
