= Coxs River railway bridges, Wallerawang =

Heritage listed railway bridges in New South Wales

Coxs River railway bridges
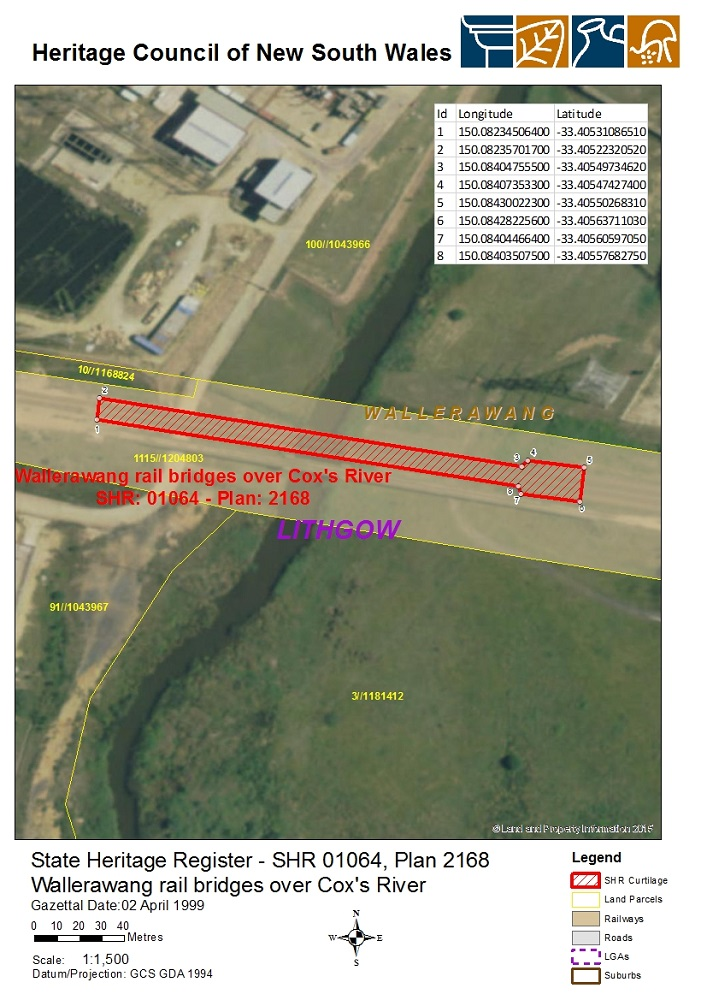
- Heritage boundaries
- Coordinates: 33°24′19″S 150°05′00″E
- Carries: Main Western Line
- Crosses: Coxs River
- Locale: Wallerawang, City of Lithgow, New South Wales, Australia
- Owner: Transport Asset Manager of New South Wales

Characteristics
- Design: Arch viaduct
- Material: Stone and masonry
- Total length: 139.6 metres (458 ft)
- Longest span: 16.5 metres (54 ft)
- No. of spans: 17

Rail characteristics
- No. of tracks: 2
- Track gauge: 4 ft 8 1/2 in (1,435 mm) standard gauge

History
- Designer: John Whitton
- Contracted lead designer: New South Wales Government Railways
- Construction end: 1870

New South Wales Heritage Register
- Official name: Wallerawang rail bridges over Cox's River
- Type: State heritage (built)
- Designated: 2 April 1999
- Reference no.: 1064
- Type: Railway Bridge/Viaduct
- Category: Transport – Rail
- Builders: Day labour

Location
- Interactive map of Coxs River railway bridges

The Coxs River railway bridges are two heritage-listed railway bridges that carry the Main Western Line over the Coxs River at Wallerawang, New South Wales, Australia. The bridges were designed by engineering staff of the New South Wales Government Railways and built in 1870 by day labour. The property is owned by Transport Asset Manager of New South Wales, an agency of the Government of New South Wales. It was added to the New South Wales State Heritage Register on 2 April 1999.

== History ==
By the early 1900s the original single track from Bowenfels to Wallerawang was inadequate for railway operations so plans were made to duplicate that section of line and at the same time ease the grades and flatten some curves.

A major programme of similar works was begun in 1910 and continued until the mid-1920s but, because steel was an expensive import from Britain, the dominant material for bridging the many waterways was bricks, mostly from the 1912 State Brickworks at Homebush and mostly in the form of brick arch culverts and viaducts. The quantity of bricks used in the programme was enormous and the period could be aptly described as the "era of the brick arch".

Normally the 6.1-metre (20 ft) clear span would have been bridged by a simple steel plate web girder, but the shortage of steel meant a continuance of brick arch construction. The Bowenfels to Wallerawang work was delayed until after World War I.

This bridge is easily accessible via Springvale Lane which is off the Mudgee Road, south-east of the Wallerawang Power Station.

== Description ==
The bridge is a significant technical accomplishment. It has seventeen stone arch spans totalling 139.6 metres (458 ft) and is the longest masonry arch bridge ever built in Australia. Its main span of 16.5 metres (54 ft) is also large, being the fifth longest of its type for its age (1870). It is also unusual in having an elliptical arch rib. The main span is flanked by stone buttresses or columns which extend above the deck. The treatment of the spandrel is unusual in that the radial joints of the arch rib are extended out to fill the entire spandrel space The bridge is thus an integral part of a section of the New South Wales rail system of immense historical significance.

The brick double track underbridge over Coxs River, 1923.

The bridge retains its original fabric.

== Heritage listing ==
As at 15 March 2006, this 1870 bridge is significant because it is one of the oldest stone arch railway viaducts in New South Wales. It is associated with John Whitton the "father of New South Wales railways", it is an impressive sandstone structure on the outskirts of historic Wallerawang, its construction contributed significantly to the subsequent railway extension to Bathurst and on to western New South Wales and when John Whitton was denied funds to continue with the expensive wrought iron girder bridges he chose the stone arch viaduct for his major bridge works, particularly for the Zig Zag east of Lithgow and the extension west to Wallerawang. It is the largest of Whitton's stone arch viaducts. It is a fine representative example of a stone arch railway viaduct and it retains its original fabric.

Wallerawang rail bridges over Cox's River was listed on the New South Wales State Heritage Register on 2 April 1999 having satisfied the following criteria.

The place is important in demonstrating the course, or pattern, of cultural or natural history in New South Wales.

This bridge is part of the Bowenfels to Wallerawang duplication, the last of such works dominated by brick arch construction.

The place has a strong or special association with a particular community or cultural group in New South Wales for social, cultural or spiritual reasons.

The duplication work contributed significantly to the railway extension to Bathurst and to the continued development of Western New South Wales, for land transport to Sydney.

The place has potential to yield information that will contribute to an understanding of the cultural or natural history of New South Wales.

The brick arch was still the most common form of railway bridge in the early 1920s due to the shortage of steel after World War I.

The place is important in demonstrating the principal characteristics of a class of cultural or natural places/environments in New South Wales.

It is a good representative example of brick arch construction.

== See also ==
- Historic bridges of New South Wales
