= Linden railway station, New South Wales =

Railway station in New South Wales, Australia

Linden
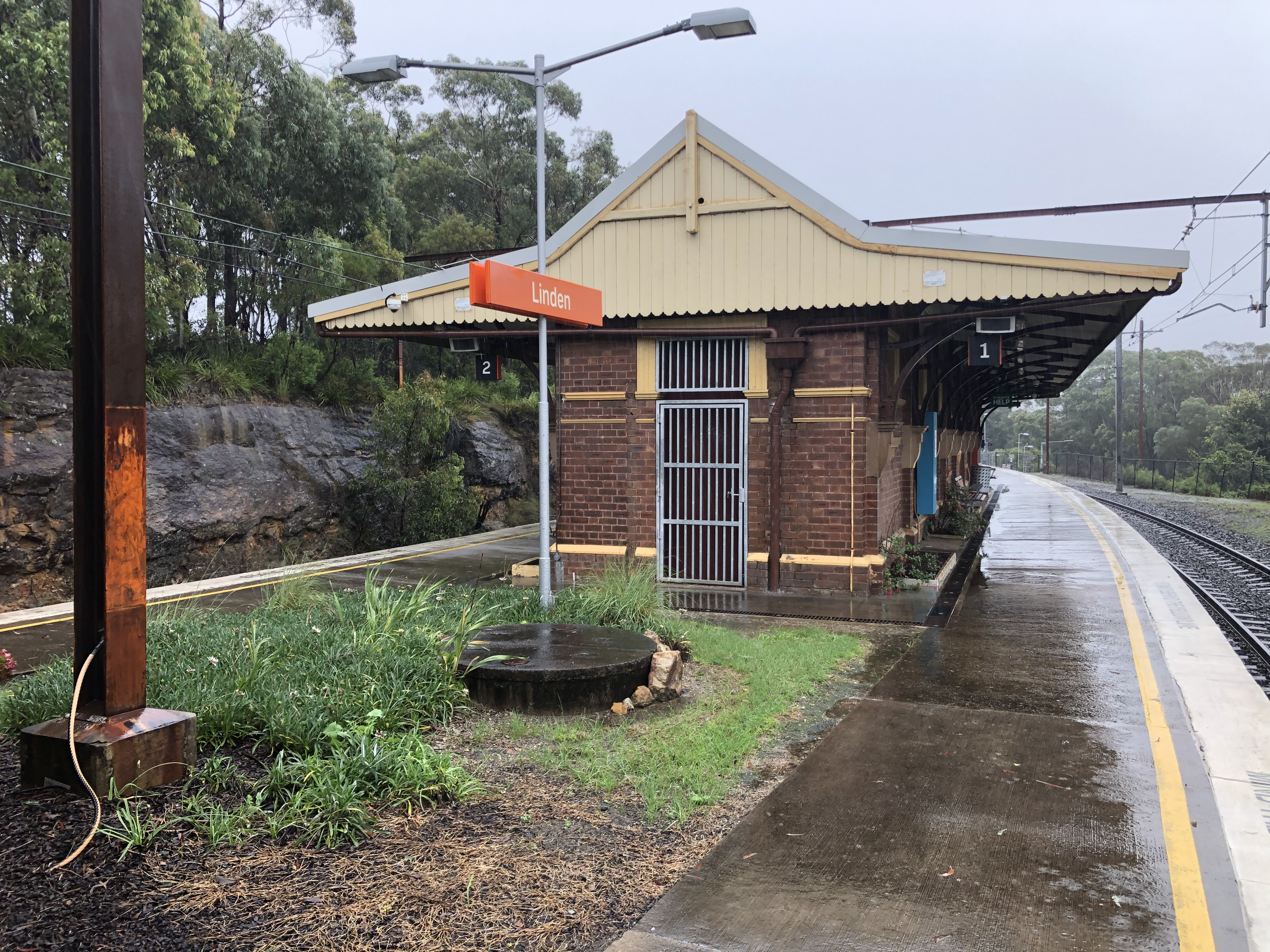
- Station platform and building, March 2021

General information
- Location: Great Western Highway, Linden; Australia
- Coordinates: 33°42′54″S 150°30′20″E
- Elevation: 523 metres (1,716 ft)
- Owner: Transport Asset Manager of New South Wales
- Operator: Sydney Trains
- Line: Main Western
- Distance: 86.81 kilometres (53.94 mi) from Central
- Platforms: 2 (1 island)
- Tracks: 2
- Connections: Bus

Construction
- Structure type: Ground

Other information
- Status: Weekdays: Staffed: 6am to 8.20am: Weekends and public holidays: Unstaffed
- Station code: LND
- Website: Transport for NSW

History
- Opened: August 1874
- Former names: Linden Tank (1874); Hendersons Platform (1874–1879)

Passengers
- 2025: 6,872 (year); 19 (daily) (Sydney Trains, NSW TrainLink)

Services
Preceding station	Intercity Trains	Following station
Woodford towards Lithgow	Blue Mountains Line	Faulconbridge towards Central
Location

Linden railway station is a heritage-listed railway station located on the Main Western line in New South Wales, Australia. It serves the Blue Mountains village of Linden opening in August 1874 as Linden Tank before being renamed Hendersons Platform on 26 October 1874, and finally Linden in 1879.

== Platforms and services ==
Linden has one island platform with two sides. It is serviced by Sydney Trains Blue Mountains Line services travelling from Sydney Central to Lithgow.

Platform	Line	Stopping pattern	Notes
1	BMT	services to Sydney Central	
2	BMT	services to Katoomba, Mount Victoria & Lithgow	

== Transport links ==
Blue Mountains Transit operates two bus routes via Linden station, under contract to Transport for NSW:

- 685H: Springwood to Hazelbrook
- 690K: Springwood to Katoomba
