= Medlow Dam =

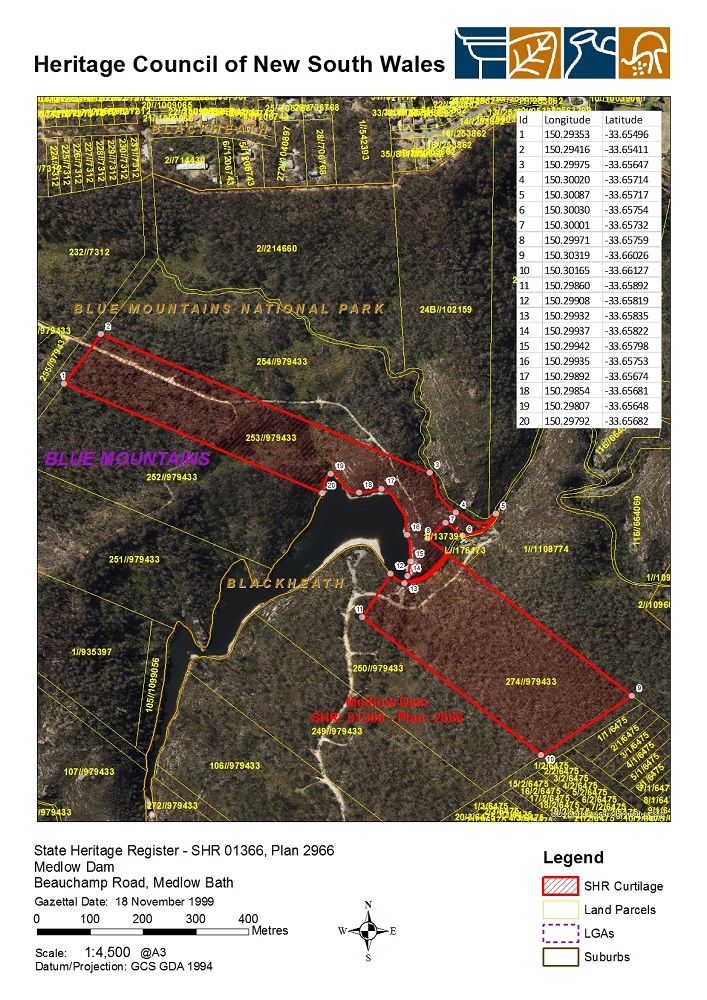
- Heritage boundaries

- Location in New South Wales
- Country: Australia
- Location: Beauchamp Road, Medlow Bath, City of Blue Mountains, New South Wales
- Coordinates: 33°39′30″S 150°17′57″E
- Purpose: Potable water supply
- Status: Operational
- Opening date: 1907
- Built by: NSW Department of Public Works
- Owner: Sydney Water

Dam and spillways
- Type of dam: Arch dam
- Impounds: Adams Creek
- Height (foundation): 20.6 metres (68 ft)
- Length: 38.2 metres (125 ft)
- Width (crest): 1.1 metres (3 ft 7 in)
- Dam volume: 1 thousand cubic metres (35×10^{3} cu ft)
- Spillways: 1
- Spillway type: Uncontrolled
- Spillway capacity: 22 cubic metres per second (780 cu ft/s)

Reservoir
- Creates: Medlow Bath Reservoir
- Total capacity: 304.5 megalitres (10.75×10^{6} cu ft)
- Active capacity: 297 megalitres (10.5×10^{6} cu ft)
- Catchment area: 4.8 square kilometres (1.9 sq mi)
- Surface area: 5 hectares (12 acres)

New South Wales Heritage Register
- Official name: Medlow Dam; Medlow Bath Dam; Lake Medlow Dam; Adams Creek Dam; Medlow Bath Reservoir
- Type: State heritage (built)
- Designated: 18 November 1999
- Reference no.: 1366
- Type: Water Supply Reservoir/ Dam
- Category: Utilities - Water
- Builders: NSW Department of Public Works

Medlow Dam is a heritage-listed major gated concrete-walled arch dam across the Adams Creek in the Blue Mountains region, located at Beauchamp Road, Medlow Bath in the City of Blue Mountains local government area of New South Wales, Australia. The dam was designed and built in 1907 by the NSW Department of Public Works. The dam's purpose is primarily for the potable water supply of the upper Blue Mountains region. The impounded reservoir is called Medlow Bath Reservoir. The dam is also known as Medlow Bath Dam, Lake Medlow Dam, Adams Creek Dam and Medlow Bath Reservoir. The property is owned by Sydney Water, a state-owned corporation of the Government of New South Wales. The dam was added to the New South Wales State Heritage Register on 18 November 1999.

== History ==
Medlow Dam is a thin-wall arch concrete dam constructed by the Public Works Department of NSW in 1907, for water supply to nearby townships and possibly for ornamental purposes. Control was vested in the Municipality of Blackheath in 1940, then transferred to the MWS&DB; in 1980. Water supply was first furnished to Medlow Bath in 1907 and subsequently extended to Blackheath, Megalong and Mount Victoria.

Medlow Dam is one of the series of so-called "Wade Dams", constructed in the late years of the nineteenth century and the early years of the twentieth century by the NSW Public Works Department under the supervision and/or design of Mr L. A. B. Wade, for water supply to country towns. They were remarkable in pioneering the general use of thin-arch concrete walls under high stresses. It is claimed that this dam, when constructed, was the thinnest of its type in the world and the basic design attracted grave misgivings in the engineering world.

Both this dam and a similar example at Lithgow are recognised in the standard engineering work "A History of Dams" as world leaders in dam design and construction and they excite continuing engineering interest for the thinness of their wall section. It is stated in the 1909 Institution of Civil Engineers paper that Mr C. W. Darley, Engineer in Chief of Public Works, was responsible for initiating the construction of this type of dam in Australia and for the completion of the earlier structures. The paper's author (L. A. B. Wade) acted under Mr Darley as Supervisor of Works and subsequently succeeding to the latter's position, was responsible for the design as well as construction of the Lithgow No. 2, Katoomba and Medlow dams.

The thirteen dams of this type were built of concrete (not reinforced), curved in plan, reliance for stability being placed only on the capacity of the material in the wall and sides of the valley to resist compression. In designing these dams, the complex question of the exact stresses that may occur and the assistance that may be afforded by the weight of the wall was disregarded; as it was considered that all practical requirements would be met if in theory the dams were treated simply as sections of rigid cylinders subject to exterior water pressure. The radius of this cylinder depended upon the natural features of the sites, it being stated elsewhere in the paper that the use of such curved walls was restricted to comparatively narrow valleys and gorges.

This local (and as it turned out, entirely successful) design followed an earlier and perhaps even bolder 1884 precedent at the Bear Valley Dam in California but it led, as had the Californian work, to a storm of criticism from the engineering profession of the day, not least, because it had proved to be successful in the face of orthodox theory, which at that time concentrated on gravity dam walls.

Comments of members of the Institution in 1909 included:

- Walter Hunter: Looking at the cross sections, he would feel a little nervous if he had to sleep on the down-stream side of one of the dams.
- Mr C. E. Jones: His fears were aroused and he thought a dangerous point had been reached. He felt very much concerned about the engineers who had charge of the dams described in the Paper, and he thought that the responsible engineers in Australia might at times pass sleepless nights.
- Mr Reginald E. Middleton: "admired the pluck" of the designers.
- Col. J. Pennycuick: "did not know that any engineers had the courage of their opinions until the NSW works were constructed".

Even the eminent Sir Alexander Binnie, Past President of the Institution, was moved to remark that "to look at the cross sections produced a blood-curdling sensation". He went on, however, to support the design as a practical achievement: it was not a matter of cavilling at theory or formulas; the dams were built and were standing. The problem that now arose was for mathematicians to show how the strains were accommodated in such apparently narrow walls. The entire justification of this then-daring and unorthodox design was economic. As stated by its originator, Mr Darley: small towns could not afford expensive gravity dams, and therefore it was a case of either building a cheap dam or not giving a water supply.

== Description ==
Medlow Dam is a small water storage dam which utilises a thin-arch concrete wall under high stress. Its design capacity for the reservoir is 304.5 megalitres (10.75×10^{6} cu ft), with a wall height (maximum) of 20.6 metres (68 ft). The radius of curvature for the dam wall is 18.5 metres (61 ft), the length of the wall is 38.2 metres (125 ft) and the thickness of the wall at its top is 1.1 metres (3 ft 7 in). It remains in everyday use for the purpose for which it was designed. It is built of concrete (not reinforced), curved in plan, with reliance for stability being placed only on the capacity of the material in the wall and sides of the valley to resist compression.

Associated with the dam is a small corrugated iron clad pumping shed, which contained three pumps. In 1993, these were rated as being of some significance, with two dating from 1927 and the third from the mid-1930s.

=== Condition ===
As at 24 September 2008, the Medlow Dam is intact and in good condition.

=== Modifications and dates ===
- 1993 - Calcite deposits were removed from the downstream face using high pressure water jets.
- 2008 - Trunnion winch was replaced and the original winch moved to the side of the carpark for interpretive purposes.

== Heritage listing ==
As at 26 August 2009, the Medlow Dam was the first of the water supply dams built as part of the development of the Upper Blue Mountains and is an important example of the "Wade" series of dams erected in NSW between the 1890s and early 1900s for NSW country town water supplies which utilised a concrete arch wall. It is associated with the NSW Department of Public Works and its design is a product of the work of two of Australia's leading engineers, L. A. B. Wade and C. W. Darley. The Medlow Dam was a world leader in the development of thin-walled concrete arch dams and created considerable controversy when completed, reputedly having the thinnest wall of any comparable dam in the world. It remains a textbook example of this form of design and construction. The completion of the Medlow Dam was a significant step in the process of providing a reliable water supply for Medlow Bath, Blackheath and the surrounding areas.

Medlow Dam was listed on the New South Wales State Heritage Register on 18 November 1999 having satisfied the following criteria.

The place is important in demonstrating the course, or pattern, of cultural or natural history in New South Wales.

The Medlow Dam was the first of the water supply dams built as part of the development of the Upper Blue Mountains and was an important example of the "Wade" series of dams erected in NSW between the 1890s and early 1900s for NSW country town water supplies which utilised a concrete arch wall. It was designed by the NSW Department of Public Works and its design is a product of the work of one of Australia's leading water supply engineers, L. A. B. Wade, who carried on the earlier work of C. W. Darley, President of the Metropolitan Water and Sewerage Board from 1893. The Medlow Dam was a world leader in the development of thin-walled concrete arch dams and created considerable controversy when completed. It remains a textbook example of this form of design and construction. The completion of the Medlow Dam was a significant step in the process of providing a reliable water supply for Medlow Bath, Blackheath and the surrounding areas.

The place is important in demonstrating aesthetic characteristics and/or a high degree of creative or technical achievement in New South Wales.

The Medlow Dam is a simple and attractive construction, located in a picturesque setting. It is an excellent example of a thin-walled concrete arch dam. The thinness of the wall sections provides a spectacular appreciation of the engineering behind the design of the dam.

The place has a strong or special association with a particular community or cultural group in New South Wales for social, cultural or spiritual reasons.

The Medlow Dam is of significance to the engineering profession, as evidenced by its listing in the Engineering Heritage Register of NSW (1994).

The Medlow Dam is of significance to the community of NSW, as evidenced by its inclusion in the National Trust of Australia (NSW) Register (1985).

The place has potential to yield information that will contribute to an understanding of the cultural or natural history of New South Wales.

The Medlow Dam represents the thinnest thin-walled concrete arch dam erected in Australia and both individually and collectively, as one of a number of dams built in NSW in the early twentieth century which utilise a similar design and similar materials, it provides continuous data as to the long-term performance of this type of dam construction.

The place possesses uncommon, rare or endangered aspects of the cultural or natural history of New South Wales.

The Medlow Dam was the first of the water supply dams built as part of the development of the Upper Blue Mountains. The Medlow Dam was a world leader in the development of thin-walled concrete arch dams and had the thinnest wall of any comparable dam in the world at the time that it was built.

The place is important in demonstrating the principal characteristics of a class of cultural or natural places/environments in New South Wales.

The Medlow Dam is representative of the "Wade" series of dams erected in NSW between the 1890s and early 1900s for NSW country town water supplies which utilised a thin concrete arch wall, although it is a notable example of that set.

== Engineering heritage award ==
The dam received a Historic Engineering Marker from Engineers Australia as part of its Engineering Heritage Recognition Program.

== See also ==
- Blue Mountains Dams
- List of reservoirs and dams in New South Wales
- Sydney Water
