= Jenolan River =

River in New South Wales, Australia

Coordinates: 33°49′S 150°06′E

Jenolan Harrys River
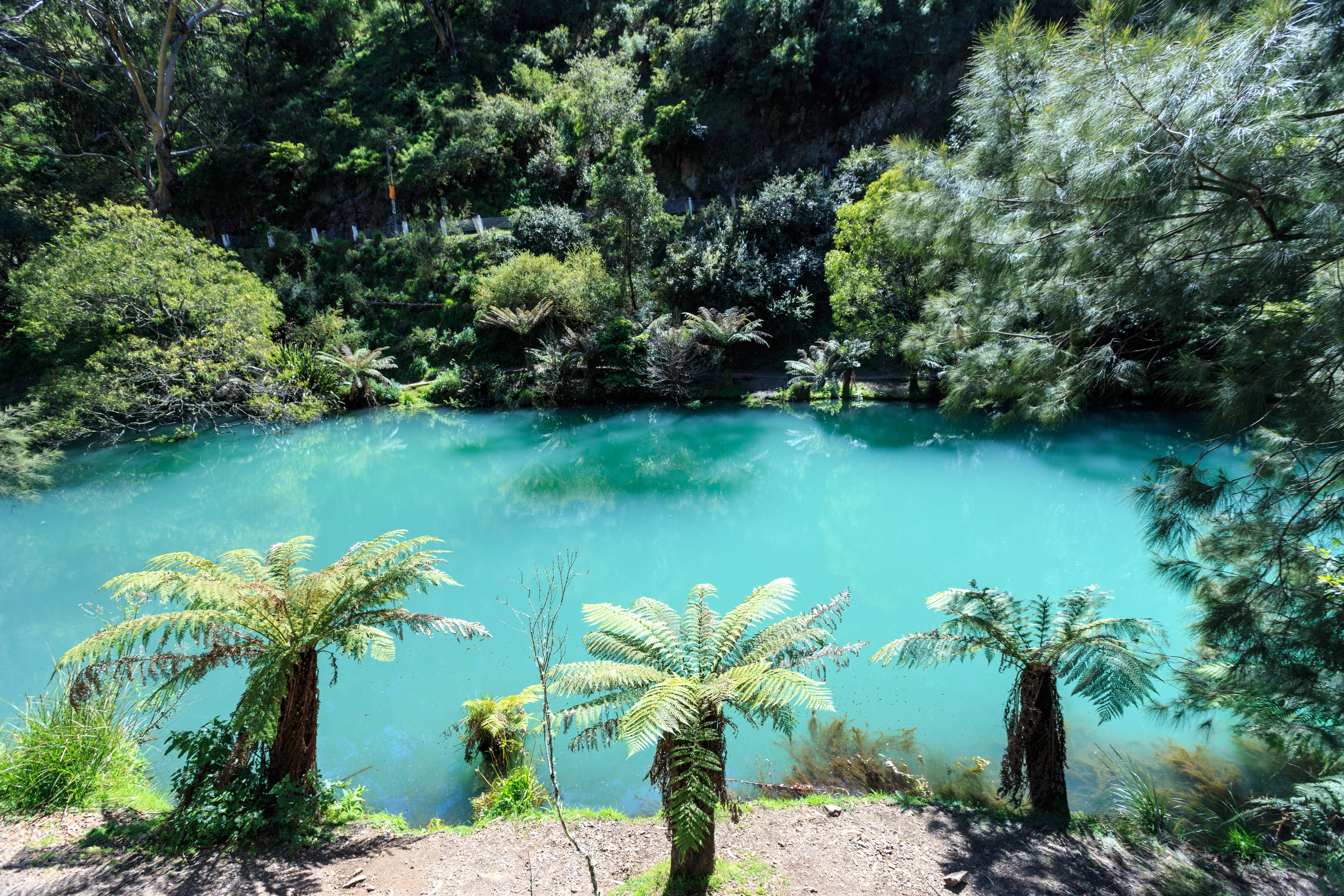

Location
- Country: Australia
- State: New South Wales
- Region: Sydney Basin (IBRA), Central Tablelands
- Local government area: Oberon

Physical characteristics
- Source: Black Mount, Great Dividing Range
  - location: Oberon
  - elevation: 1,190 m (3,900 ft)
- Mouth: confluence with the Coxs River
  - location: below Mount Jenolan
  - elevation: 939 m (3,081 ft)
- Length: 11 km (6.8 mi)

Basin features
- River system: Hawkesbury-Nepean catchment
- Tributaries
  - right: Mumbedah Creek
- Forest: Jenolan State Forest

The Jenolan River is a perennial river that is part of the Hawkesbury-Nepean catchment, located in the Central Tablelands region of New South Wales, Australia.

== Course and features ==
The Jenolan River rises below Black Mount on the eastern slopes of the Great Dividing Range southeast of Oberon, and flows generally southeast and east, joined by several minor tributaries before reaching its confluence with the Coxs River below Mount Jenolan. The river descends 80 metres (260 ft) over its 11-kilometre (6.8 mi) course.

At Jenolan Caves the river flows underground for approximately 400 metres (1,300 ft).

== See also ==
- Jenolan Caves
- List of rivers of Australia
- List of rivers of New South Wales (A–K)
- Rivers of New South Wales
