= Mount Trickett =

Mountain in New South Wales, Australia

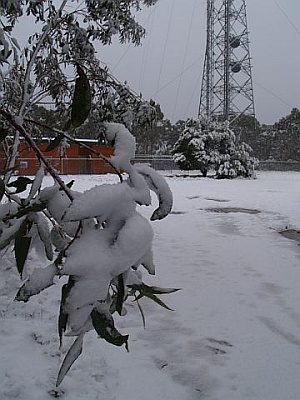
- Mount Trickett under snow, 2007

Highest point
- Elevation: 1,362 m (4,469 ft) AHD
- Coordinates: 33°49′59″S 149°59′01″E

Geography
- Location within New South Wales
- Location: Central Tablelands, New South Wales, Australia
- Parent range: Great Dividing Range

Climbing
- Easiest route: drive

Mount Trickett, a mountain on the Great Dividing Range, is located approximately 6 kilometres (3.7 mi) west of Jenolan Caves, in the Central Tablelands region of New South Wales, Australia.

With an elevation of 1,362 metres (4,469 ft) above sea level, the mountain can be seen from the nearby Jenolan-Oberon Road. The 'summit' or the area generally known as Mount Trickett is topped by a high tower, and stands over 500 metres (1,600 ft) above Jenolan Caves in the valley below. The tower location (around 1,349 metres (4,426 ft) and called "The Porcupine") is not actually Mount Trickett or the highest point. The true location of Mount Trickett is approximately 800 metres (2,600 ft) further west along Edith Road.

== Features ==
Snowfalls are relatively common on Mount Trickett from autumn through to spring with perhaps ten to fifteen falls per season. Five or six of these snowfalls are typically heavy enough to close the roads near the summit. Icy roads during the colder months can also make travel in the area hazardous although it is usually navigable by 2WD vehicles. Particularly strong cold outbreaks make an approach from the Jenolan Caves side quite risky and the Oberon road is preferred. There is an undistinguished gravel turnoff which leads to a brick building at the summit with a sign that says "Navigational Facility". As with nearby Mount Bindo and Shooters Hill, this is a common spot for 'snow chasers' to look for snow when coming in from Sydney and the Blue Mountains.

There are no survey control marks (including trigonometrical stations) located at the summit of Mount Trickett.

== Etymology ==
Mount Trickett may well have been named after Oliver Trickett L.S. M.S., as he was the licensed surveyor, mapper and modeller of the Jenolan Caves over twenty years in the late 1800s to early 1900s, (along with surveying and mapping most other major limestone caves in NSW, and surveying, mapping and modelling the mining loads of NSW, chief being the Broken Hill silver, lead and zinc load). This work was conducted whilst in the employ as Surveyor for the NSW Department of Lands and Mining Surveyor for the NSW Department of Mines. He became the chief superintendent of Jenolan Caves in terms of overseeing all access improvements at Jenolan in the early 1900s.

== See also ==
- List of mountains in New South Wales
