= Blue Mountains Dams =

Dams in New South Wales, Australia

The Blue Mountains Dams are a series of six dams in the Blue Mountains which supply water to the Blue Mountains and Sydney, Australia. The Dams are managed by the WaterNSW. Water in this scheme may be supplemented from the Fish River Scheme.

== Cascade Dams ==
There are three dams built on the Cascade Creek, near Katoomba, known as Cascade numbers 1, 2 and 3. The Middle Dam was first, completed in 1908. It is 15 metres (49 ft) tall; 105 metres (344 ft) long; and holds 160 megalitres (35×10^{6} imp gal; 42×10^{6} US gal). The Lower Cascade Dam is an earthfill embankment dam with a central concrete core which was completed in 1926. It is 26 metres (85 ft) high; 128 metres (420 ft) long; and holds 320 megalitres (70×10^{6} imp gal; 85×10^{6} US gal). The Upper Cascade Dam is another earthfill embankment dam, built in 1938. It is 30 metres (98 ft) high; 247 metres (810 ft) long; and it holds 1,700 megalitres (370×10^{6} imp gal; 450×10^{6} US gal).

Middle Cascade Dam is a "Darley-Wade" dam named after the series of dams designed by L.A.B Wade, a prominent dam engineer of the era and CW Darley who designed the first constant radius thin-arch dam in Australia (Lithgow 1). It was originally constructed in 1908 as a buttress section before being raised to a constant radius arch dam to satisfy the increasing water demand of the area. Stage 1, known originally as "Katoomba Dam" was a curved buttress dam built to a height of 7.6m. The dam was built with every intent for future raising. The dam was raised by filling in the spaces of the buttresses with concrete. The right abutment consists of a gravity section to increase the effectiveness of the arch action and due to unsuitable foundations for an arch abutment.

== Lake Medlow and Greaves Creek Dams ==
The heritage-listed Lake Medlow and Greaves Creek Dams were built on the Adams and Greaves Creeks respectively. Lake Medlow Dam was the first concrete thin arch, high stress dam built in New South Wales, and is one of the thinnest dams in the world. It is 20 metres (66 ft) high; 38 metres (125 ft) long; and holds 300 megalitres (66×10^{6} imp gal; 79×10^{6} US gal). Greaves Creek Dam is also a concrete arch dam, it was completed in 1942. It is 19 metres (62 ft) high; 67 metres (220 ft) long; and holds 310 megalitres (68×10^{6} imp gal; 82×10^{6} US gal). Sydney Water decommissioned the Greaves Creek Treatment Plant.

== Woodford Creek Dam ==
Woodford Creek Dam is a concrete arch dam which was built on the junction of Woodford Creek and Bulls Creek and completed in 1928. It was subsequently raised several times. It is 16 metres (52 ft) high and 144 metres (472 ft) long. Water is no longer drawn from Woodford Dam. In late 2009 Woodford Dam surrounds were opened up to walkers and mountain bikers. Access to the dam wall and lake is still prohibited.

Originally envisaged to supply steam trains, Woodford Dam is one of six dams constructed to supply water to the Blue Mountains area. Two raisings have occurred with the latest in 1947. Due to the closure of the Linden Water filtration Plant in circa 2000, the storage is no longer used for water supply and the outlet raw water pipework has been disconnected and capped.

The first stage was constructed by NSW Railways between 1928 and 1929. Stage two raised the storage by 2.44m in 1935. The final third stage increased the storage by an additional 3.05m in 1947.

Although rare, the storage has been used for rural firefighting by helicopters.

The dam wall is an arch/gravity structure with keyed vertical contraction joints and copper waterstops. The foundations are excavated into the sandstone in a series of steps

== Water Quality ==
Testing conducted by Sydney Water in June 2024 found that levels of PFAS in the Cascade Dams were greater than 10ppt. Levels of PFOS and PFHxS in the "Katoomba" Cascade dam were measured at 16.4 and 14.2ppt respectively, while the "Blackheath" dam contained 15.5 and 13.6ppt respectively. While within the Australian designated safe limit at the time (70ppt for PFOS and PFHxS combined), the readings were around 300 times higher than those of Warragamba Dam (0.1ppt total), and over 4 times the US enforceable threshold of 4ppt (PFOS only), at which point the chemical must be removed. Up until this information was published, Sydney Water had maintained that there were no known PFAS hotspots within the catchment.

== Coordinates ==
- 33°39′30″S 150°17′58″E - Lake Medlow Dam
- 33°39′14″S 150°18′33″E - Greaves Creek Dam
- 33°41′31″S 150°18′06″E - Upper Cascade Dam
- 33°41′20″S 150°18′11″E - Middle Cascade Dam
- 33°41′01″S 150°18′19″E - Lower Cascade Dam
- 33°41′53″S 150°29′06″E - Woodford Dam
