= Coxs River =

Coordinates: 33°57′S 150°25′E

Coxs
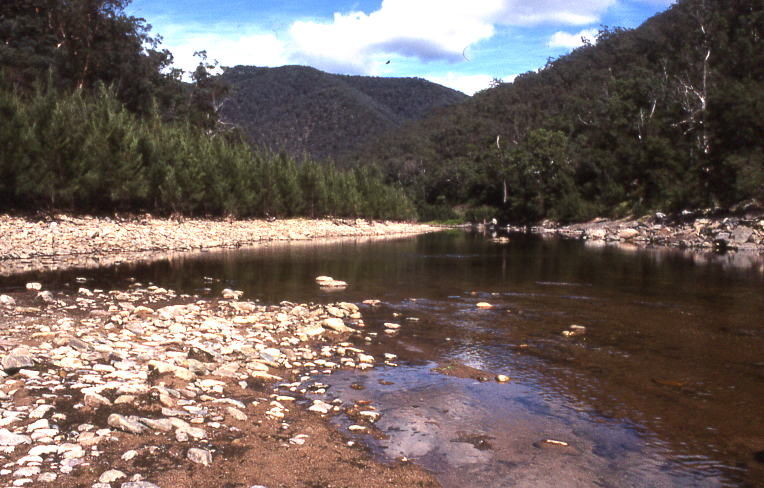
- Coxs River near Mount Cookem
- Etymology: In honour of William Cox

Location
- Country: Australia
- State: New South Wales
- Region: Sydney Basin (IBRA), Central Tablelands, Blue Mountains, Macarthur
- Local government areas: Blue Mountains, Lithgow, Wollondilly

Physical characteristics
- Source: Gardiners Gap, within Ben Bullen State Forest
  - location: Cullen Bullen
  - elevation: 1,040 m (3,410 ft)
- Mouth: confluence with Warragamba River to form Lake Burragorang
  - elevation: 114 m (374 ft)
- Length: 155 km (96 mi)

Basin features
- River system: Hawkesbury-Nepean catchment
- Tributaries
  - left: Blackheath Creek, Pulpit Hill Creek, Megalong Creek, Galong Creek, Breakfast Creek (New South Wales), Cedar Creek (New South Wales), Kedumba River
  - right: Ganbenang Creek, Long Swamp Creek, Little River (Oberon), Jenolan River, Kanangra Creek, Kowmung River, Wollondilly River, Butchers Creek
- Bridges: Railway bridges at Wallerawang; Jack Wilson Bridge
- Reservoirs: Lake Wallace, Lake Lyell, Lake Burragorang

The Coxs River, a perennial river that is part of the Hawkesbury-Nepean catchment, is located in the Central Tablelands, Blue Mountains, and Macarthur regions of New South Wales, Australia.

== Course and features ==
The Coxs River rises in Gardiners Gap, within Ben Bullen State Forest, east of Cullen Bullen, and flows through the Megalong Valley and parts of the Greater Blue Mountains Area World Heritage Site including the Blue Mountains and Kanangra-Boyd national parks, heading generally south and then east, joined by fifteen tributaries including the Little, Jenolan, Kedumba, Kowmung, and Wollondilly rivers, before reaching its confluence with the Warragamba River to form Lake Burragorang. The river descends 931 metres (3,054 ft) over its 155-kilometre (96 mi) course.

The river is impounded at Lake Wallace where it forms a cooling source for Wallerawang Power Station; at Lake Lyell where it is used for water supply for the city of Lithgow and water cooling for Wallerawang Power Station; and at Lake Burragorang, a major water supply source for greater metropolitan Sydney.

At Wallerawang, the river is crossed by a stone single-track railway bridge, completed in 1870; and a replacement masonry/brick double-track railway underbridge, completed in 1923. East of Wallerawang, the Great Western Highway (A32) also crosses the river, via the Jack Wilson Bridge.

== History ==
To the Aboriginal peoples who lived in the area for thousands of years before white settlement, Coxs River was one of two corridors that could be used to cross the Blue Mountains, the other being the Bilpin Ridge, now the site of Bells Line of Road. Coxs River was the easiest way to cross the mountains, but this fact was unknown to the European settlers, for whom the mountains were a seemingly impassable barrier.

A former convict, John Wilson, may have been the first European to cross the Blue Mountains. Wilson arrived with the First Fleet in 1788 as a convict and was released in 1792. After this, he lived with the Aborigines and functioned as an intermediary between them and the settlers. In 1797 Wilson returned to Sydney, claiming to have explored up to a hundred miles in all directions around Sydney, including across the mountains. His descriptions and observations were generally accurate, and it is possible that he had crossed the mountains via the Coxs River corridor, guided by the Aborigines.

Governor Macquarie named both Coxs River and Coxs Pass in honour of William Cox, a military officer, roadmaker and builder. In 1815 the naming of the Coxs River is mentioned:

The junction of these two streams a very handsome river, now called by the Governor "Cox's River" which takes its course...and empties itself into the River Nepean...

— Historical Records of Australia (Series I, Volume VIII, p. 572).

== Pollution ==
As of 2008, there were concerns about water quality in upper Coxs River. Testing carried out by researchers from the Blue Mountains Conservation Society showed that this part of the river had high levels of heavy metals including zinc, copper and manganese, 125 times more sulphate than surrounding streams and only 5% of the oxygen that fish need. The pH level, a test of acidity, was up to 1000 times higher than that of neighbouring creeks, while the river was 80 times as salty as it should be. The Sydney Catchment Authority confirmed that the test was accurate, but said the water gets safer to drink in the lower river, approaching Warragamba Dam. The Department of Environment and Climate Change stated that the contamination could be caused by Delta Electricity's Wallerawang Power Station reusing its water as a result of drought. Delta stated that it was operating within the conditions of its licence.

In 2009, Dr Ian Wright of the University of Western Sydney reported that the water flowing into Coxs River contained high levels of copper, boron and other metals at "many times" the levels found upstream of the Wallerawang Power Station. High arsenic levels were found down stream of the plant, although it was diluted further downstream and was not thought to pose a risk to humans. The Blue Mountains Conservation Society was taking a case to the Land and Environment Court of New South Wales with the backing of Environment Defenders Office of New South Wales, intending to argue that Delta Electricity are polluting Coxs River. The Society also intended to challenge the New South Wales system of environmental licences. The Society's president, Tara Cameron, said: "These licences are just licences to pollute. They are just allowing the status quo and making people feel good without actually protecting the environment." Journalists Ben Cubby and Erik Jensen maintained that the NSW Government had known about the pollution for over two years.

== Activities and access ==
A range of leisure activities are accessible adjacent to the river, including the Katoomba to Mittagong Trail, the Six Foot Track and camping.

Vehicle access is available at many locations along the river. There are several areas close to Hartley. As the river progresses towards Lake Burragorang, vehicle access is not permitted. Bushwalking is the most popular access method to the Coxs River. There are several well maintained historic walks that follow along scenic sections of the river. One of the most popular is the Six Foot Track. Horse riding is another popular way to enjoy the Coxs river. There are several tour operators in the Megalong Valley that offer day and overnight rides.

== See also ==
- Blue Mountains National Park
- List of rivers of Australia
- List of rivers of New South Wales (A–K)
- Megalong Valley
- Rivers of New South Wales
- Wallerawang Power Station
