= Mountains Christian Academy =

Mountains Christian Academy (MCA) was an independent non-denominational Christian co-educational early learning, primary and secondary day school, located in Blackheath, in the Blue Mountains region of New South Wales, Australia.

== Overview ==
The school was affiliated with the Covenant Evangelical Church. This church was founded by Howard Carter in the mid-1980s, and the school was started to educate the children of the church.

It originally began as a high school in 1976 and eventually included kindergarten and primary when there were enough children. It followed an education system known as Accelerated Christian Education (ACE), which came from the United States of America. MCA was one of the first schools in Australia to implement this system of education, closer to a homeschool academy than to the familiar type of church school.

Although MCA itself was a short-lived institution, it was the testing ground for a new educational paradigm that took off very rapidly. The swift success of this new style of education caused uncertainty and disquiet among Australian educationalists. At MCA, Logos Foundation (Australia) introduced a type of education which offered an inexpensive, locally controlled alternative to state-run schools but was "criticised for religious, racial and community segregation", and the early-1980s saw intensifying conflicts between the ACE and government schools systems.

The Academy closed in 1988 when the Covenant Evangelical Church and Logos Foundation (the CEC's political and educational arm) moved their headquarters to Toowoomba, Queensland. The curriculum and culture of The Academy was eventually duplicated by Logos at Toowoomba Christian College.
