= Mount Bindo =

Mountain in Australia

- Location within New South Wales

Highest point
- Elevation: 1,364 m (4,475 ft)
- Coordinates: 33°40′38″S 150°00′35″E

Geography
- Location: Central Tablelands, New South Wales, Australia
- Parent range: Great Dividing Range
- Topo map: Hampton

Climbing
- Easiest route: Drive

Mount Bindo, a mountain on the Great Dividing Range, is located in the Central Tablelands region of New South Wales, Australia.

With an elevation of 1,364 metres (4,475 ft) above sea level, Mount Bindo is one of the highest points on the Central Tablelands and attracts regular light snowfalls in winter. Nearby towns include the hamlet of Hampton, Jenolan Caves and the town of Oberon. As with nearby Mount Trickett and Shooters Hill, Mount Bindo is a popular destination for 'snow chasers' during the winter months.

== Access to the summit ==
From the town of Oberon, the Duckmaloi Road heads east for 26 kilometres (16 mi) until it meets the Hampton-Jenolan Caves Rd. There is a roadside rest area here on Hampton State Forest. A dry-weather forest road, the Tea Tree Road, turns left here and heads through the pines to the junction with Bindo Boundary Road. Turn left to the summit of Mount Bindo, from where there are fine views over the Megalong Valley, taking in Oberon to the west, Lithgow to the north, Blackheath and the Hydro-Majestic Hotel at Medlow Bath to the east and two towers to the south.

== Gallery ==
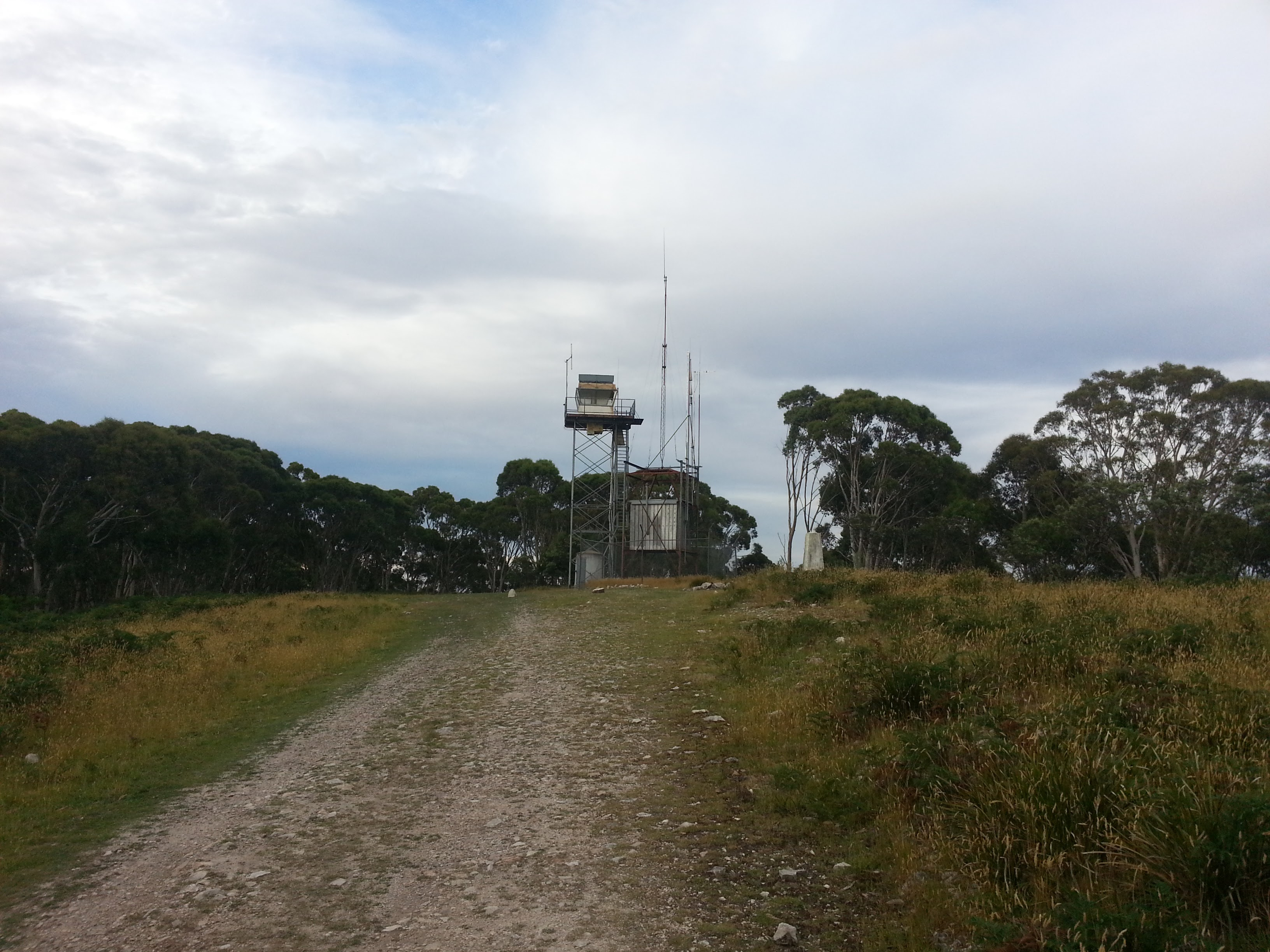
The summit of Mount Bindo.

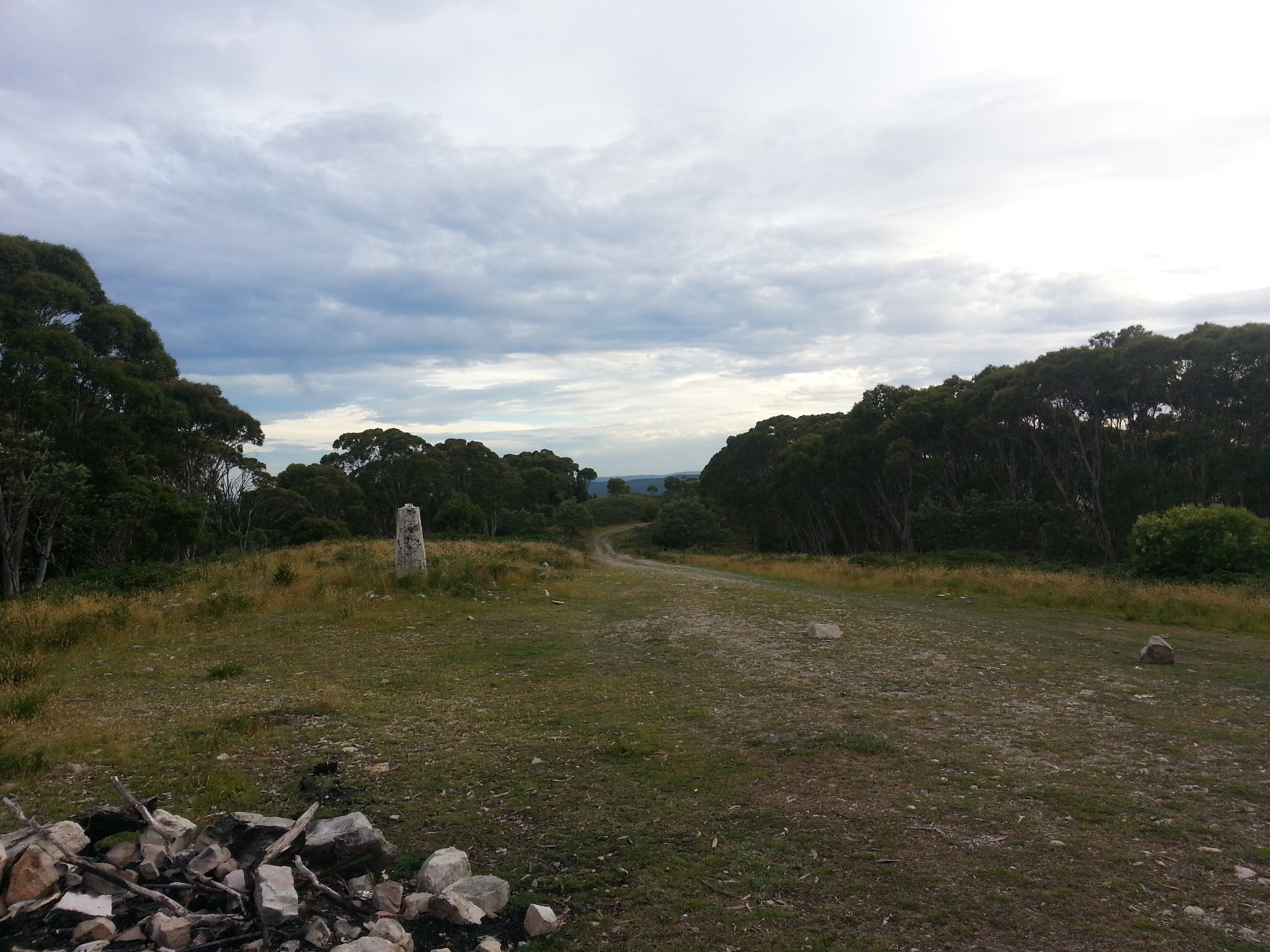
Trig point at the summit of Mount Bindo.

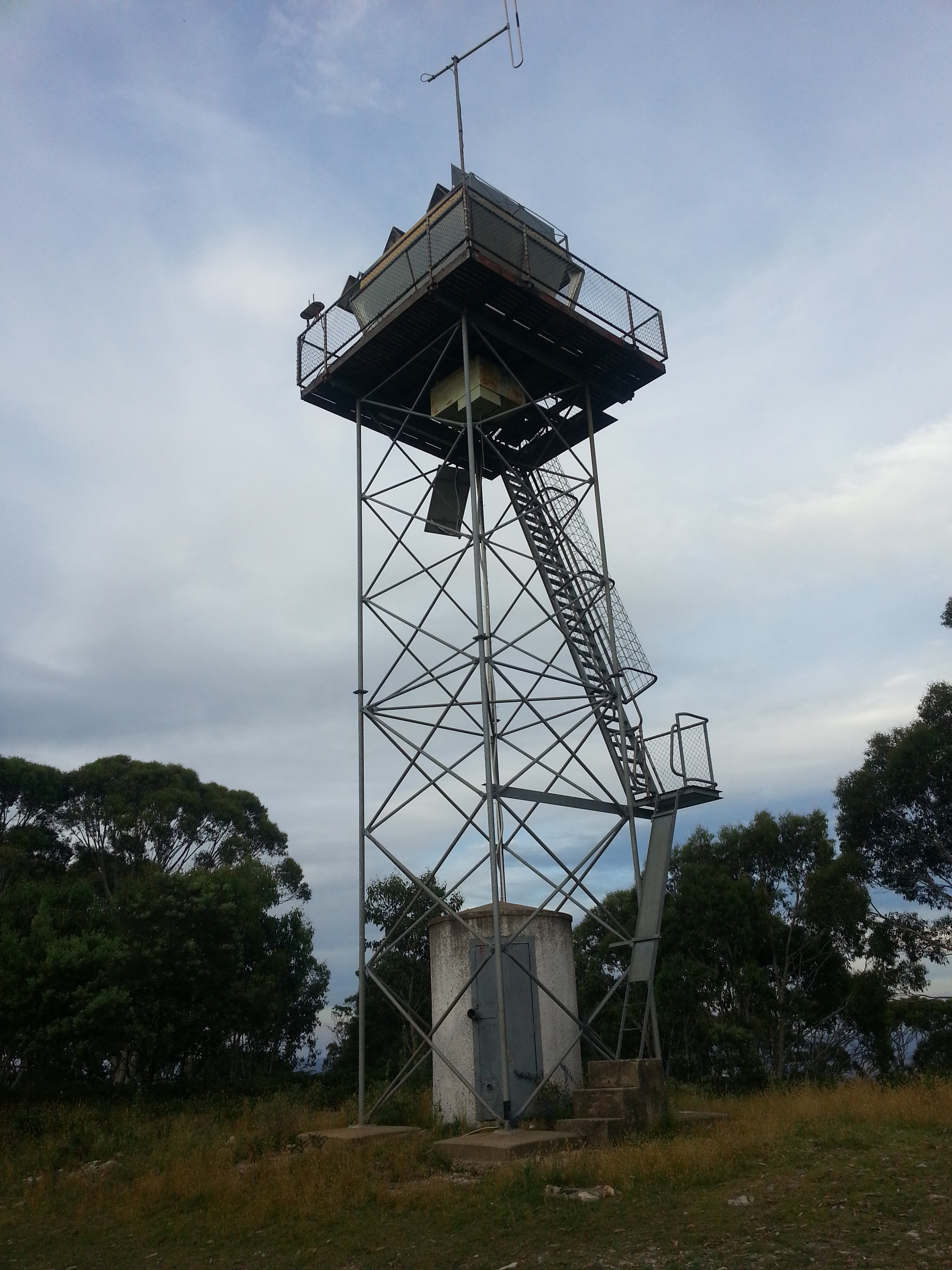
Fire Tower on the summit of Mt. Bindo.

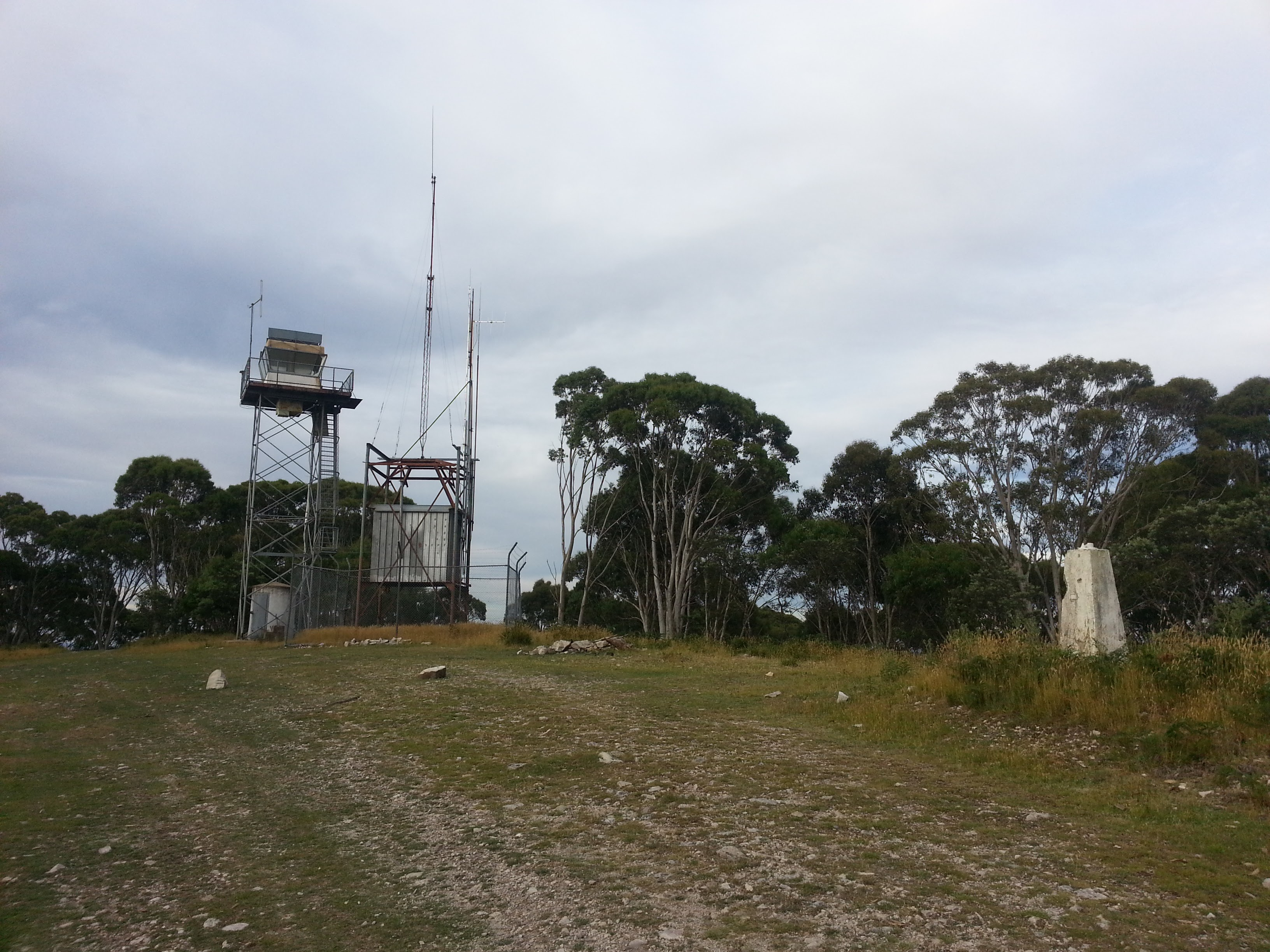
Trig point and structures at the summit of Mt. Bindo.

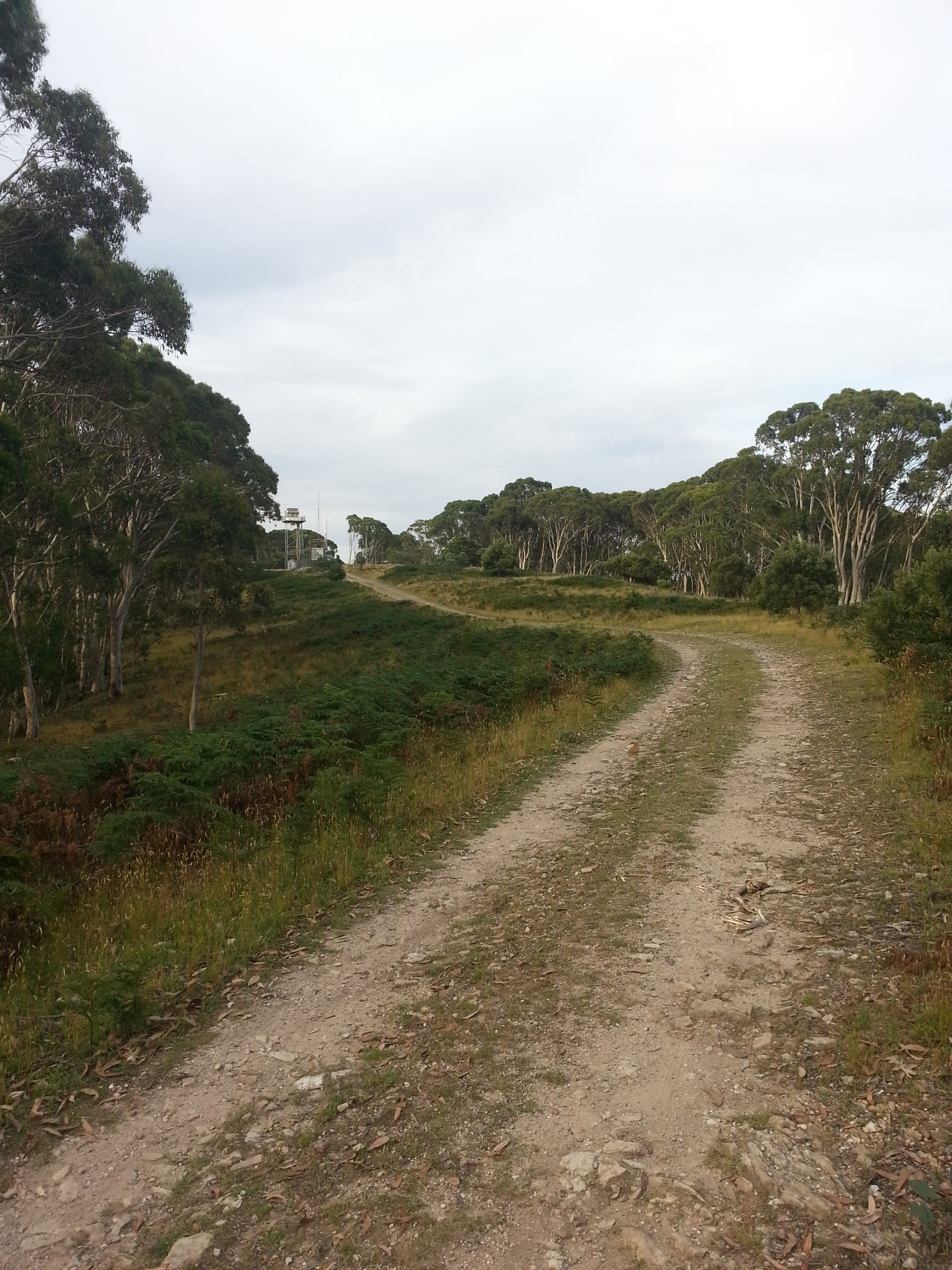
Track approaching the summit of Mount Bindo.

== See also ==
- List of mountains in New South Wales
