= Kowmung River =

River in New South Wales, Australia

Coordinates: 33°52′S 150°16′E

Kowmung Dryander River
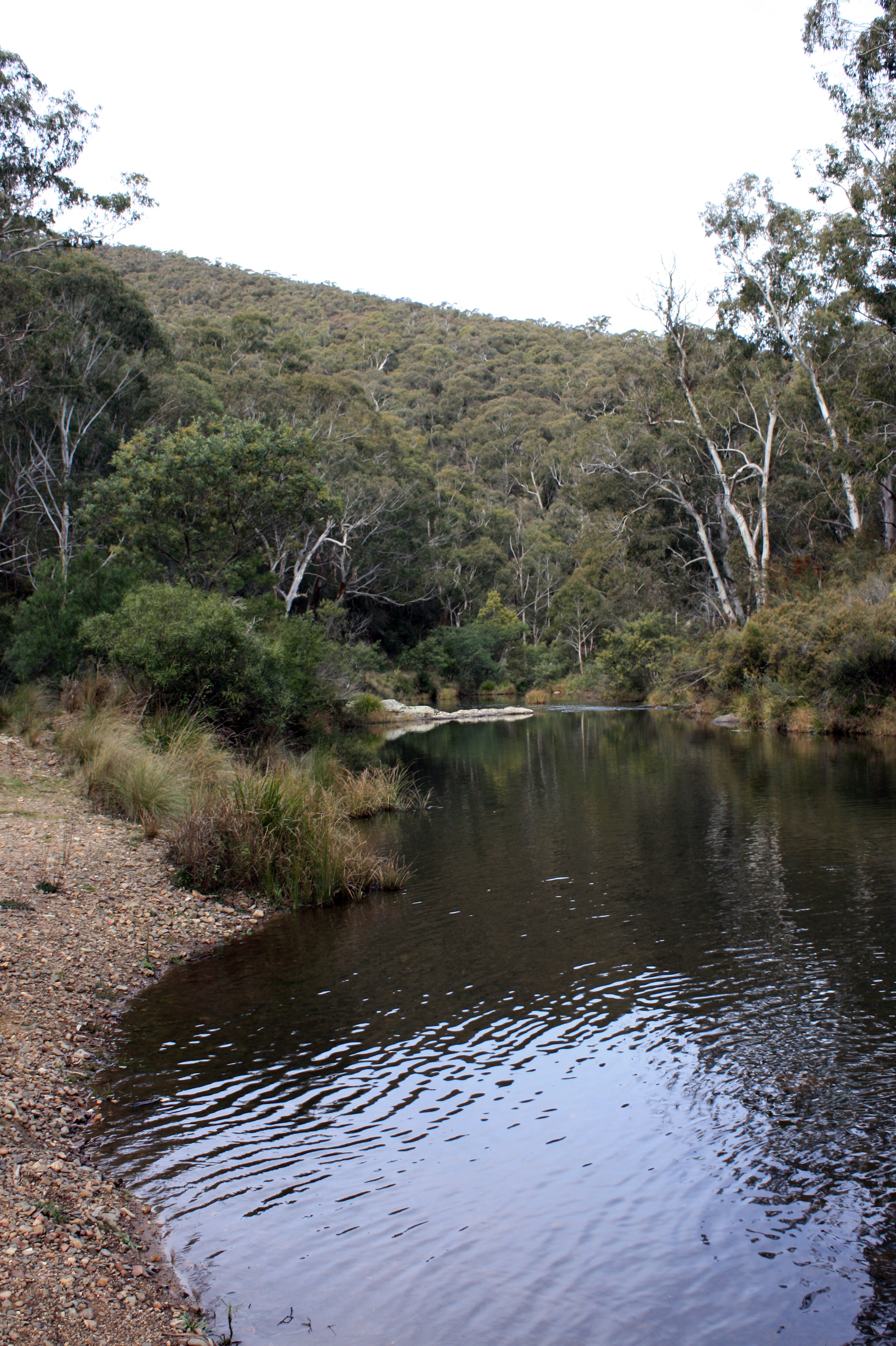
- Etymology: Aboriginal: gummung meaning "sore eyes"
- Native name: Kowmung (Aboriginal); Barnalay (Gundungurra)

Location
- Country: Australia
- State: New South Wales
- Region: Sydney Basin (IBRA), Central Tablelands
- Local government areas: Oberon, Blue Mountains

Physical characteristics
- Source confluence: Hollanders River and Tuglow River
  - location: Tuglow, near Shooters Hill
  - elevation: 941 m (3,087 ft)
- Mouth: confluence with the Coxs River
  - location: west of Mount Cookem
  - elevation: 125 m (410 ft)
- Length: 74 km (46 mi)

Basin features
- River system: Hawkesbury-Nepean catchment
- Tributaries
  - left: Morong Creek, Hanrahans Creek, Doris Creek, Christys Creek, Gingra Creek
  - right: Redcliff Creek, Waterfall Creek
- National parks: Kanangra-Boyd, Blue Mountains

The Kowmung River (Gandangara: Barnalay), a perennial river that is part of the Hawkesbury-Nepean catchment, is located in the Central Tablelands region of New South Wales, Australia.

== Course and features ==
The Kowmung River is formed by the confluence of the Tuglow and Hollanders rivers near the locality of Tuglow, east southeast of the village of Shooters Hill. The river flows generally southeast and northeast, joined by seven minor tributaries, before reaching its confluence with the Coxs River west of Mount Cookem. The river descends 816 metres (2,677 ft) over its 74-kilometre (46 mi) course.

Approximately seventy per cent of the river's catchment lies within the boundaries of the Blue Mountains and Kanangra-Boyd national parks.

Much of the surrounding country is rugged, with steep cliffs and gorges. It is mostly covered by eucalyptus forest with some rainforest in deep ravines. The river is possibly home to the threatened Macquarie perch (Macquaria australasica), while the surrounds are home to the endangered species the brush-tailed rock wallaby (Petrogale penicillata), stuttering frog and south-eastern petaltail. Endangered flora found include Hakea dohertyi, Trachymene saniculifolia and Diuris aequalis.

== Nomenclature ==
The river's name appears to be derived from the local Aboriginal word gummung meaning "sore eyes", likely a term for the condition trachoma. This is possibly because a plant, Centipeda cunninghamii, used by the local people to cure the condition grew along the riverbanks. Surveyor H.C. White recorded the Kowmung name in 1833; however, the Gandangara people called the river Barnalay elsewhere along its course.

In his attempt to cross the Blue Mountains in 1802, Francis Barrallier came to the river and followed it to Christys Creek before turning back due to a lack of supplies. Following in Barrallier's footsteps in 1806, George Caley came to the river and named it the Dryander.

== See also ==
- List of rivers of Australia
- List of rivers of New South Wales (A–K)
- Rivers of New South Wales
