= Hazelbrook railway station =

Railway station in New South Wales, Australia

Hazelbrook
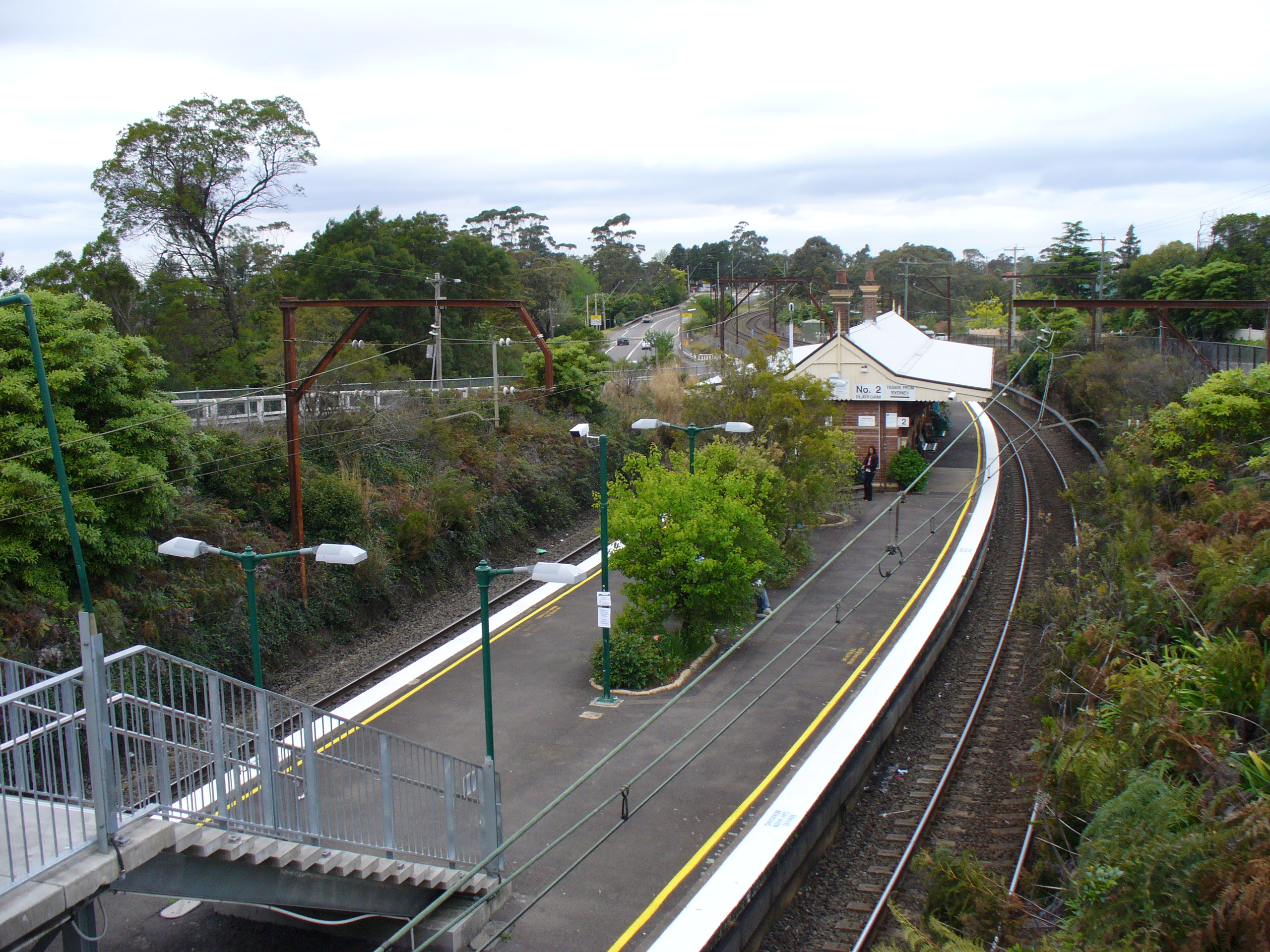
- Eastbound view of the station platforms, September 2006

General information
- Location: Railway Parade, Hazelbrook; Australia
- Coordinates: 33°43′26″S 150°27′16″E
- Elevation: 674 metres (2,211 ft)
- Owner: Transport Asset Manager of New South Wales
- Operator: Sydney Trains
- Line: Main Western
- Distance: 93.47 kilometres (58.08 mi) from Central
- Platforms: 2 (1 island)
- Tracks: 2
- Connections: Bus

Construction
- Structure type: Ground
- Accessible: Yes

Other information
- Status: Weekdays: Staffed: 5.35am to 1.35pm: Weekends and public holidays: Unstaffed
- Station code: HZK
- Website: Transport for NSW

History
- Opened: 1884

Passengers
- 2025: 127,500 (year); 349 (daily) (Sydney Trains, NSW TrainLink)

Services
Preceding station	Intercity Trains	Following station
Lawson towards Lithgow	Blue Mountains Line	Woodford towards Central
Wentworth Falls towards Lithgow	Blue Mountains Line Limited express	Springwood towards Central
Location

Hazelbrook railway station is a heritage-listed railway station located on the Main Western line in New South Wales, Australia. It serves the Blue Mountains town of Hazelbrook.

Hazelbrook Railway Station is an express stop station, there are three morning express trains heading east, and three afternoon express trains heading west. Neighbouring express stations are Springwood (east) and Wentworth Falls (west).

== History ==
The station opened in 1884.

In December 2019 an upgrade to the station was complete which included a new lift.

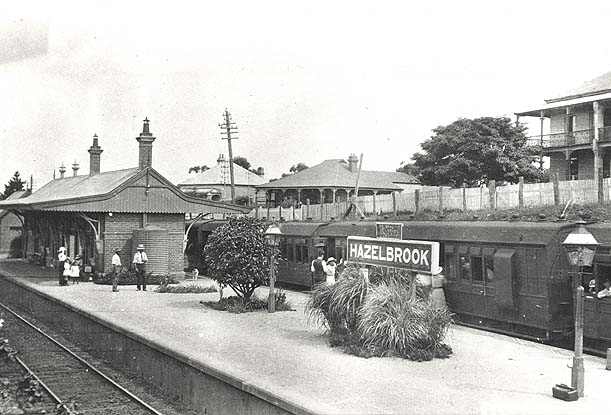
The station c.1915

== Platforms and services ==
Hazelbrook has one island platform with two sides. It is serviced by Sydney Trains Blue Mountains Line services travelling from Sydney Central to Lithgow.

Platform	Line	Stopping pattern	Notes
1	BMT	services to Sydney Central	
2	BMT	services to Katoomba, Mount Victoria & Lithgow	

== Transport links ==
Blue Mountains Transit operates two bus routes via Hazelbrook station, under contract to Transport for NSW:

- 685H: to Springwood
- 690K: Springwood to Katoomba
