= Mount Piddington =

Mountain in New South Wales, Australia

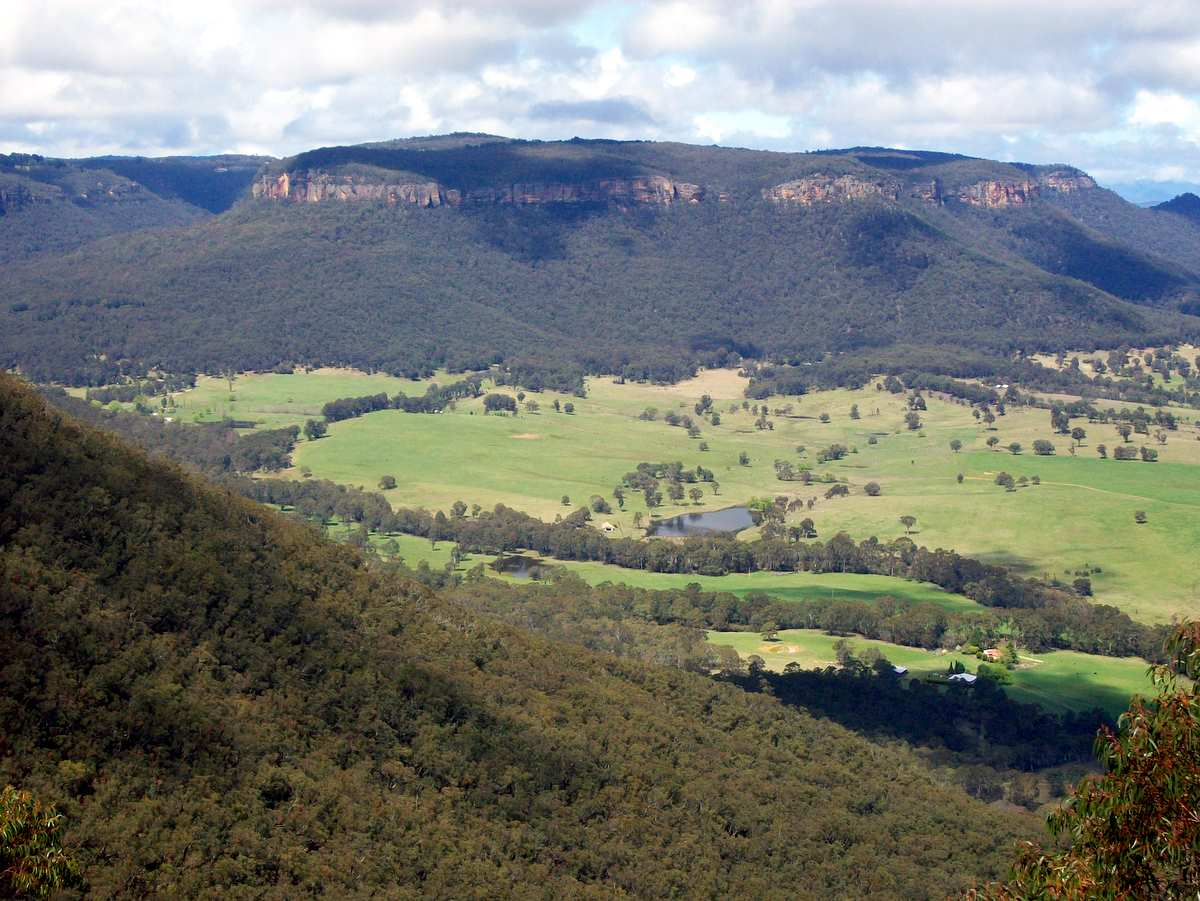
- A view from Mount Piddington, looking southeast

Highest point
- Elevation: 1,094 m (3,589 ft)
- Coordinates: 33°36′S 150°15′E

Naming
- Native name: Wirindi (Aboriginal)

Geography
- Location within New South Wales
- Location: Blue Mountains, New South Wales, Australia
- Parent range: Explorer Range

Mount Piddington (Aboriginal: Wirindi) is a mountain in the Explorer Range of the Blue Mountains region, located south of the village of Mount Victoria in New South Wales, Australia.

It is accessible from the village via a loop road and is the starting point of several bushwalking tracks leading to caves, rock climbing areas, and the valley floor.

The mountain overlooks the Kanimbla Valley, although views are somewhat obstructed by eucalypt trees.

== History ==
Mountt Piddington is named after William Richman Piddington, former colonial treasurer under Henry Parkes, who owned land on the site and "felled many trees on its summit in order that visitors might enjoy the view" some time before April 1871.

The land owned by Piddington was bequeathed to the public and named Mount Piddington Reserve. The area covered an area of 200 acres.

In 1885, the government extended the reserve by 68 acres.

In 1897, 7 acres of the reserve were resumed for "railway purposes".

== Rock climbing ==
Mt Piddington (Piddo), is a significant area of traditional climbing in Australia. It includes Janicepts (21), first ascended by John Ewbank in 1966, and freed by Mike Law in 1973, making it the hardest climb in the country at that time.

== See also ==
- List of mountains of Australia § New South Wales
