= Shooters Hill, New South Wales =

Shooters Hill
- Town
- Coordinates: 33°55′S 149°52′E
- Country: Australia
- State: New South Wales
- LGA: Oberon Shire
- Elevation: 1,355 m (4,446 ft)

Population
  - Total: 29 (SAL 2021)
- Postcode: 2787

Shooters Hill is a locality and mountain located 25 kilometres (16 mi) south of Oberon, New South Wales. It is the fourth highest point in the Central Tablelands at 1,355 metres (4,446 ft) AHD, behind Mount Canobolas at 1,394 metres (4,573 ft) AHD, Mount Bindo at 1,363 metres (4,472 ft) AHD and Mount Trickett at 1,362 metres (4,469 ft) AHD. Shooters Hill is a common location for snowfalls in the Central Ranges.

The tower location at 1,355 metres (4,446 ft) AHD is along Tower Road, accessible by turning off from a turnoff near the Shooters Hill locality area. The locality area (marked as Shooters Hill on most mapping software) is approximately 1,242 metres (4,075 ft) AHD. One can get good views over the area east of Shooters Hill at the tower location.

Shooters Hill Post Office opened on 1 December 1889 and closed in 1978.

== Climate ==
Although no climate data exists for the summit or even the upper slopes of Vulcan State Forest, there is however climate data existing for a lower region located further south in the Gurnang State Forest.

The region is subject to high winds and volatile weather year-round. Snow can fall heavily from June to September, less so in the mid to late spring months, and on extremely rare occasions snow flurries can occur in the summer atop of Shooters Hill summit (most recently in December 2013).

Climate data for Gurnang State Forest (1933–1975); 1,148 m AMSL; 34.01° S, 149.84° E
Month	Jan	Feb	Mar	Apr	May	Jun	Jul	Aug	Sep	Oct	Nov	Dec	Year
Record high °C (°F)	34.5 (94.1)	34.4 (93.9)	31.1 (88.0)	25.6 (78.1)	23.3 (73.9)	16.7 (62.1)	15.0 (59.0)	18.9 (66.0)	23.9 (75.0)	26.7 (80.1)	28.9 (84.0)	33.3 (91.9)	34.5 (94.1)
Mean daily maximum °C (°F)	22.8 (73.0)	22.1 (71.8)	20.2 (68.4)	15.4 (59.7)	11.1 (52.0)	8.1 (46.6)	7.4 (45.3)	8.7 (47.7)	12.2 (54.0)	15.5 (59.9)	18.1 (64.6)	21.5 (70.7)	15.3 (59.5)
Mean daily minimum °C (°F)	9.0 (48.2)	9.3 (48.7)	7.3 (45.1)	3.8 (38.8)	1.0 (33.8)	−0.3 (31.5)	−1.6 (29.1)	−0.7 (30.7)	0.4 (32.7)	3.2 (37.8)	5.1 (41.2)	7.2 (45.0)	3.6 (38.5)
Record low °C (°F)	−0.6 (30.9)	0.0 (32.0)	−5.6 (21.9)	−4.4 (24.1)	−8.0 (17.6)	−7.8 (18.0)	−10.0 (14.0)	−10.1 (13.8)	−6.7 (19.9)	−6.7 (19.9)	−3.3 (26.1)	−1.1 (30.0)	−10.1 (13.8)
Average precipitation mm (inches)	89.8 (3.54)	78.9 (3.11)	67.7 (2.67)	70.4 (2.77)	76.2 (3.00)	96.5 (3.80)	84.6 (3.33)	89.1 (3.51)	77.9 (3.07)	85.2 (3.35)	85.3 (3.36)	75.6 (2.98)	1,008.5 (39.70)
Average precipitation days (≥ 0.2 mm)	8.9	8.8	8.6	9.5	10.9	14.1	13.3	13.1	10.6	10.6	10.2	9.0	127.6

== See also ==
- List of mountains of Australia § New South Wales
- Retreat River
