= Hazelbrook, New South Wales =

Hazelbrook
- Suburb
- Interactive map of Hazelbrook
- Coordinates: 33°44′S 150°27′E
- Country: Australia
- State: New South Wales
- City: City of Blue Mountains
- LGA: City of Blue Mountains
- Location: 91 km (57 mi) W of Sydney CBD; 16 km (9.9 mi) E of Katoomba

Government
  - State electorate: Blue Mountains
  - Federal division: Macquarie
- Elevation: 675 m (2,215 ft)

Population
  - Total: 5,077 (2021 census)
- Postcode: 2779
Suburbs around Hazelbrook
	Blue Mountains National Park	Blue Mountains National Park
Lawson	Hazelbrook	Woodford

Hazelbrook is a town in New South Wales, Australia (Elevation: 675 metres). It is located 91 kilometres west of Sydney and 16 kilometres east of Katoomba in the Blue Mountains on the Great Western Highway.

== History and description ==
The town was named after Hazelbrook House, built in the 1870s by Svonte Noles. The name Hazelbrook was adopted in 1894 when the Hazelbrook railway station was opened opposite the home. Hazelbrook House no longer exists but Selwood House is a heritage-listed building in the nearby vicinity and now houses a veterinary practice. Other attractions in the area include Terrace Falls, Victor Falls and Bedford Pool on the south side of the village. These southern waterfalls are connected to Lawson via the South Lawson Waterfall Circuit. Lyre Bird Glen, Oaklands Falls, Horseshoe Falls and Burgess Falls are on the north side.

1st Hazelbrook scout group was established in 1922 and was part of the lower blue mountains district and is now part of blue mountains district. 1st Hazelbrook scout group is one of 5 scouts groups in the blue mountains. On 16 October 2022 1st Hazelbrook scout group celebrated their 100th anniversary

The village is serviced by a number of schools; Hazelbrook Public School (kindergarten to Year 6), the humanist Korowal School (Kindergarten to HSC), Blue Mountains Steiner (Pre-School to Year 6) and two child care centres.

There is a shopping centre that includes a supermarket and several shops, restaurants and cafes.

Hazelbrook volunteer Rural Fire Brigade established in 1959 by the local community and is one of 26 Rural Fire Brigades in the Blue Mountains. Hazelbrook Rural Fire Brigade operates one Category 1 tanker, one Category 7 tanker, and a personnel carrier (PC). As of 2023, the station is also home to the Category 13 Blue Mountains Bulk Water Tanker.

Hazelbrook has a local football club, known as the Hazelbrook Hawks, whose home ground is Gloria Park, and a lawn bowls club, co-located at Gloria Park.

Australian author James Roy lives in Hazelbrook.

== Population ==
According to the 2021 census of Population, there were 5,077 people in Hazelbrook.

- Aboriginal and Torres Strait Islander people made up 4.5% of the population.
- 81.6% of people were born in Australia. The next most common country of birth was England at 4.9%.
- 91.1% of people spoke only English at home.
- The most common responses for religion were No Religion 49.8%, Catholic 16.2% and Anglican 11.7%.

== Gallery ==
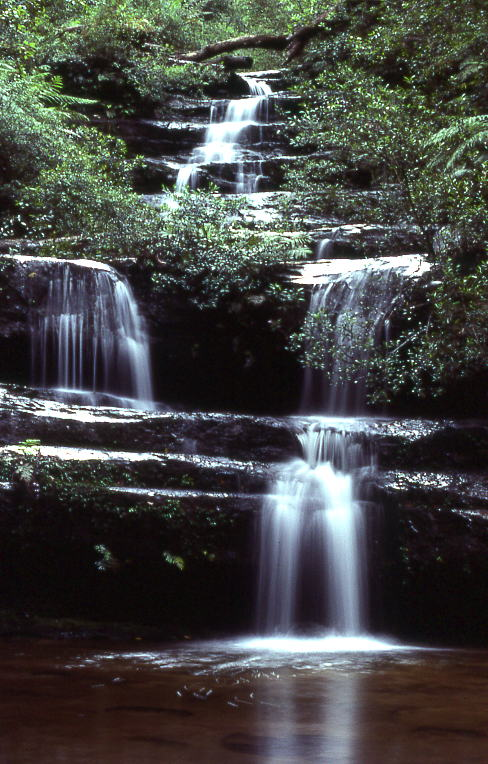
Terrace Falls, on the south side of Hazelbrook

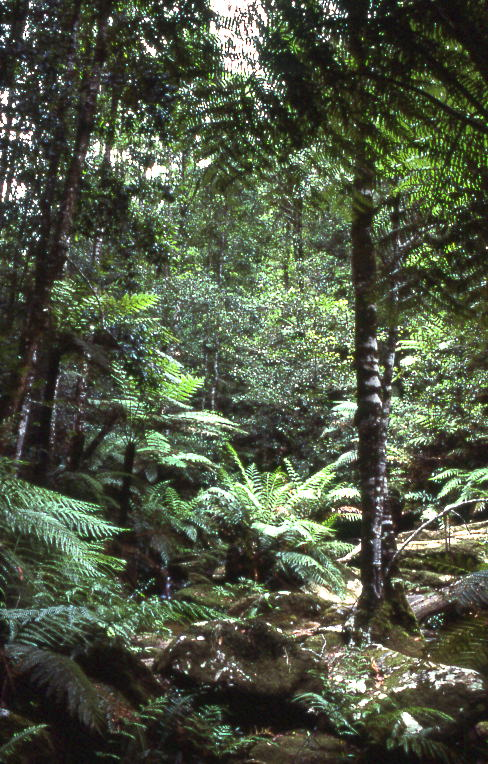
Rainforest pocket near Terrace Falls

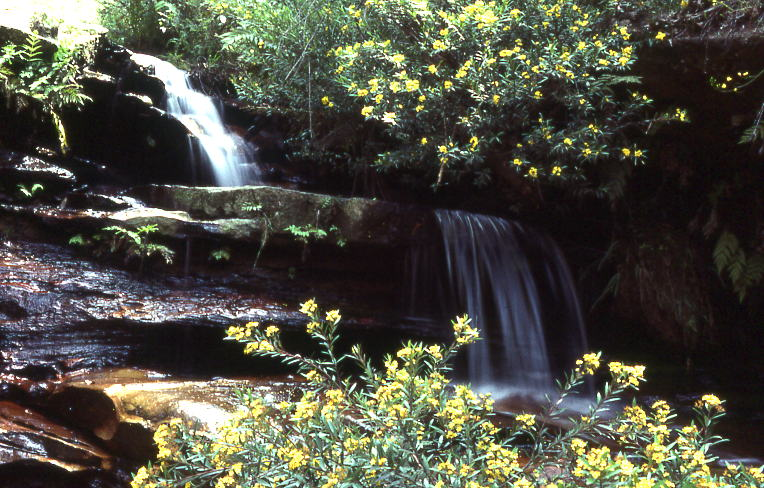
Lyrebird Glen, Hazelbrook area

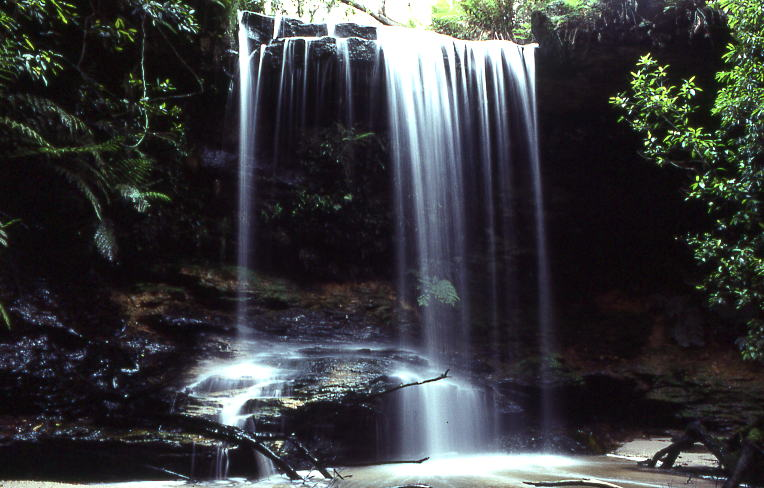
Burgess Falls, Hazelbrook area

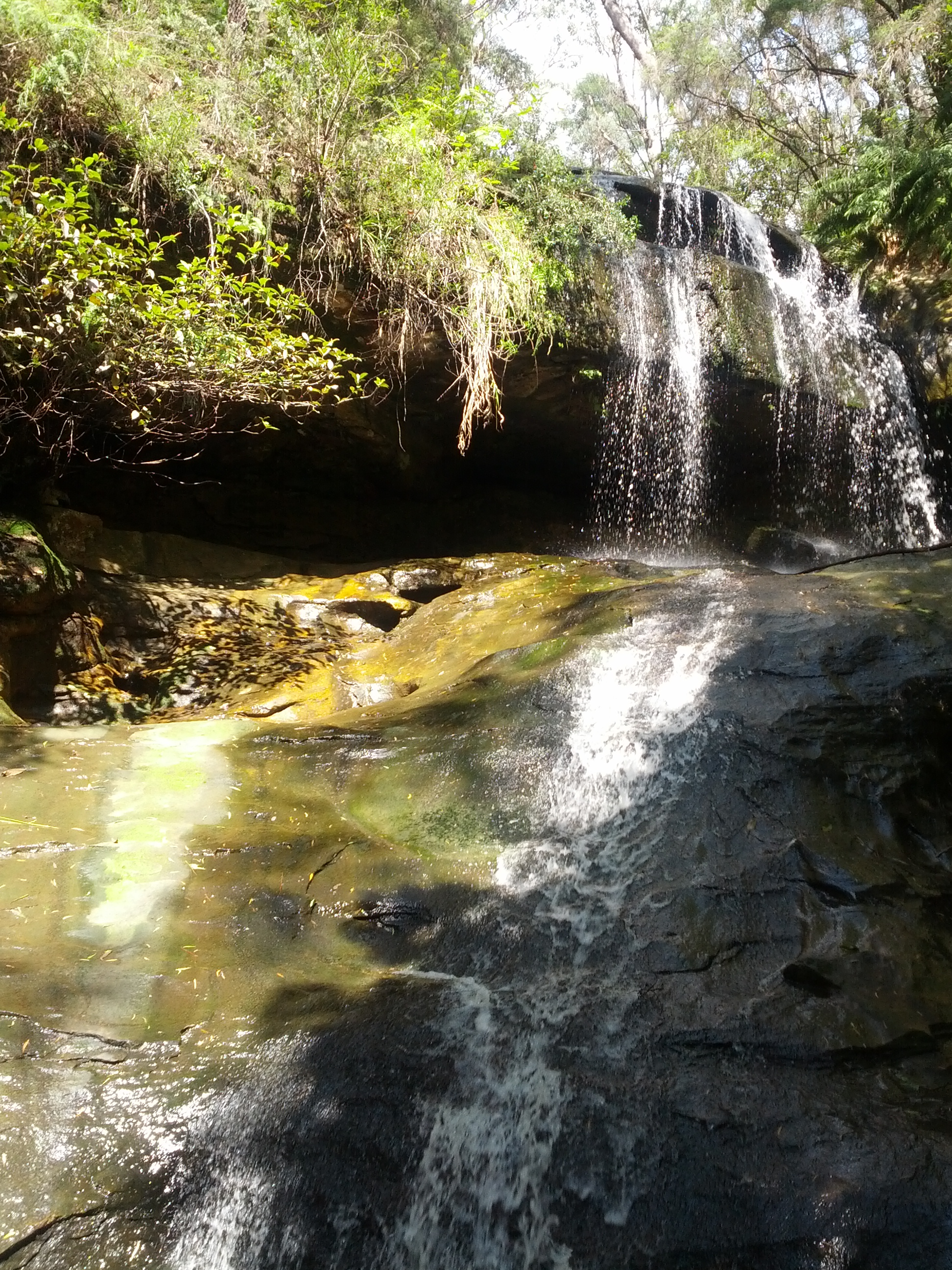
Horseshoe Falls, Hazelbrook area

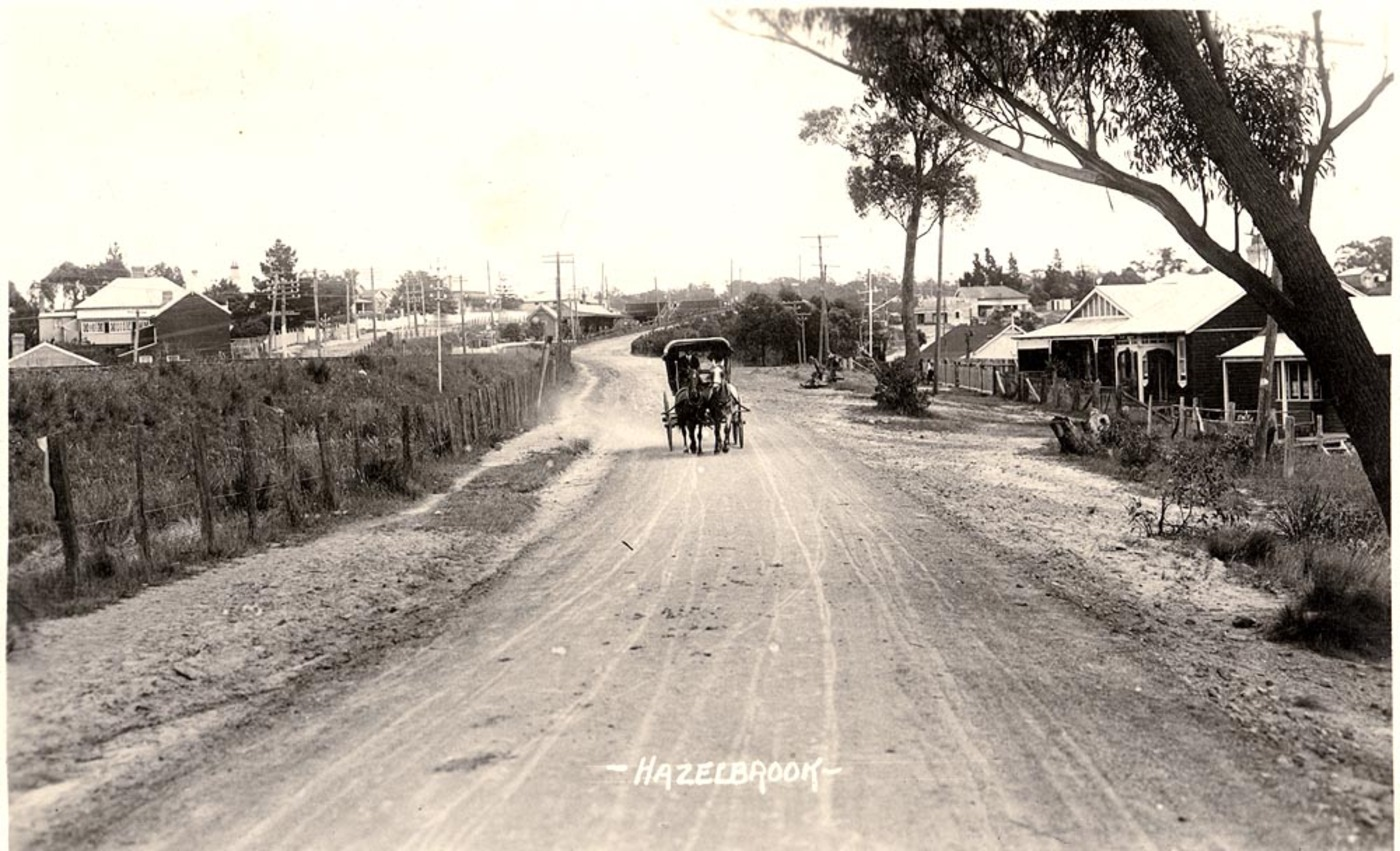

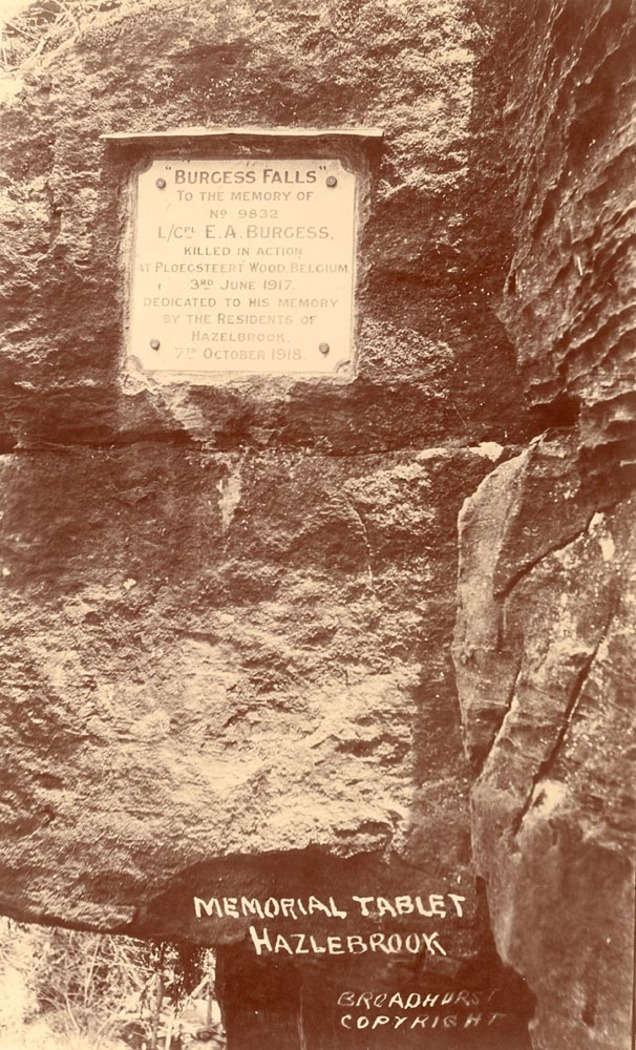

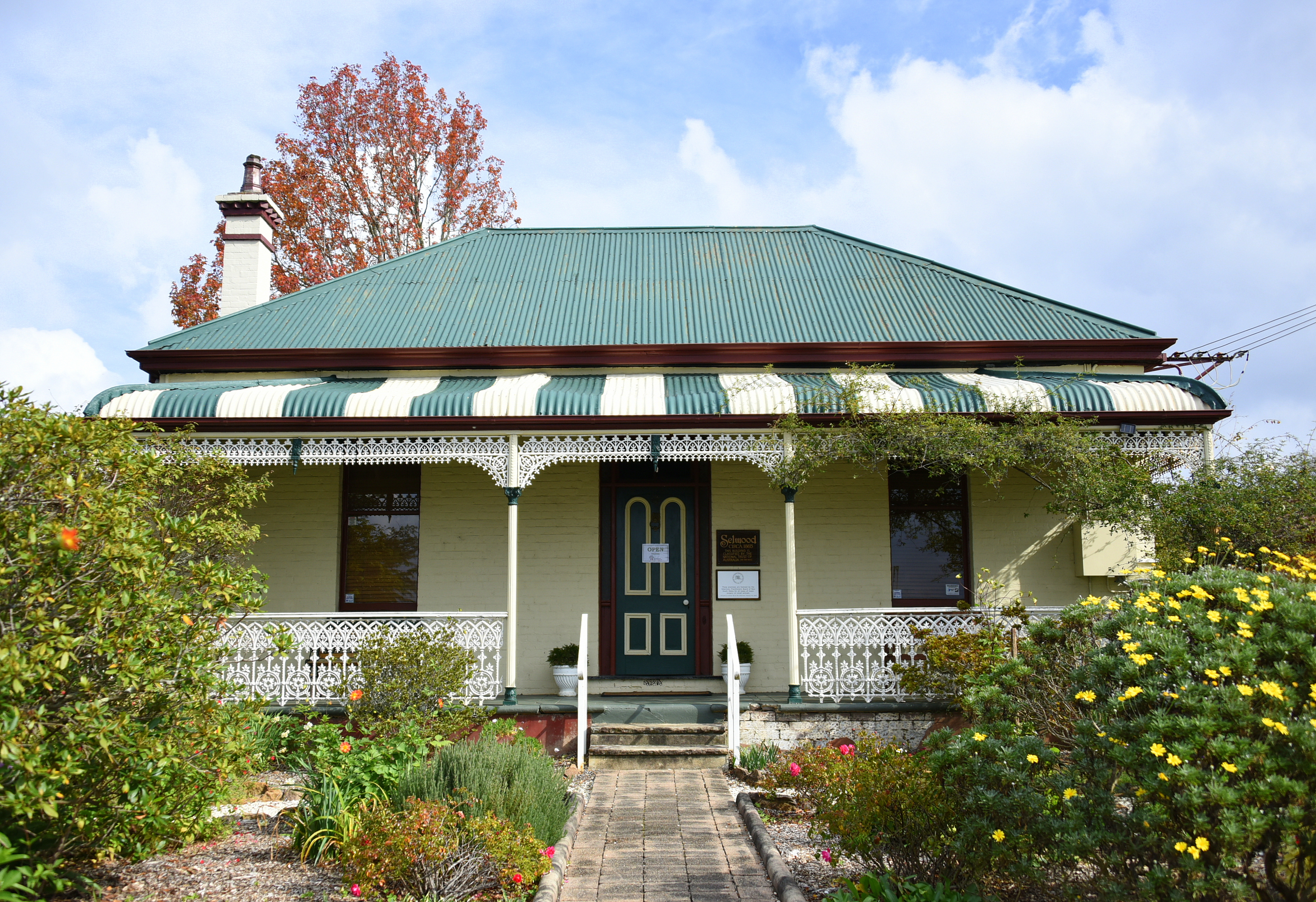

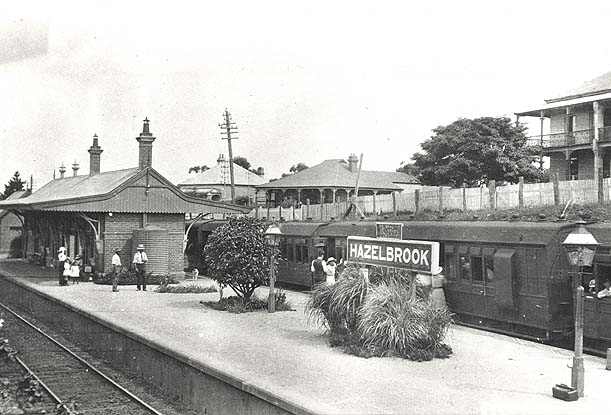

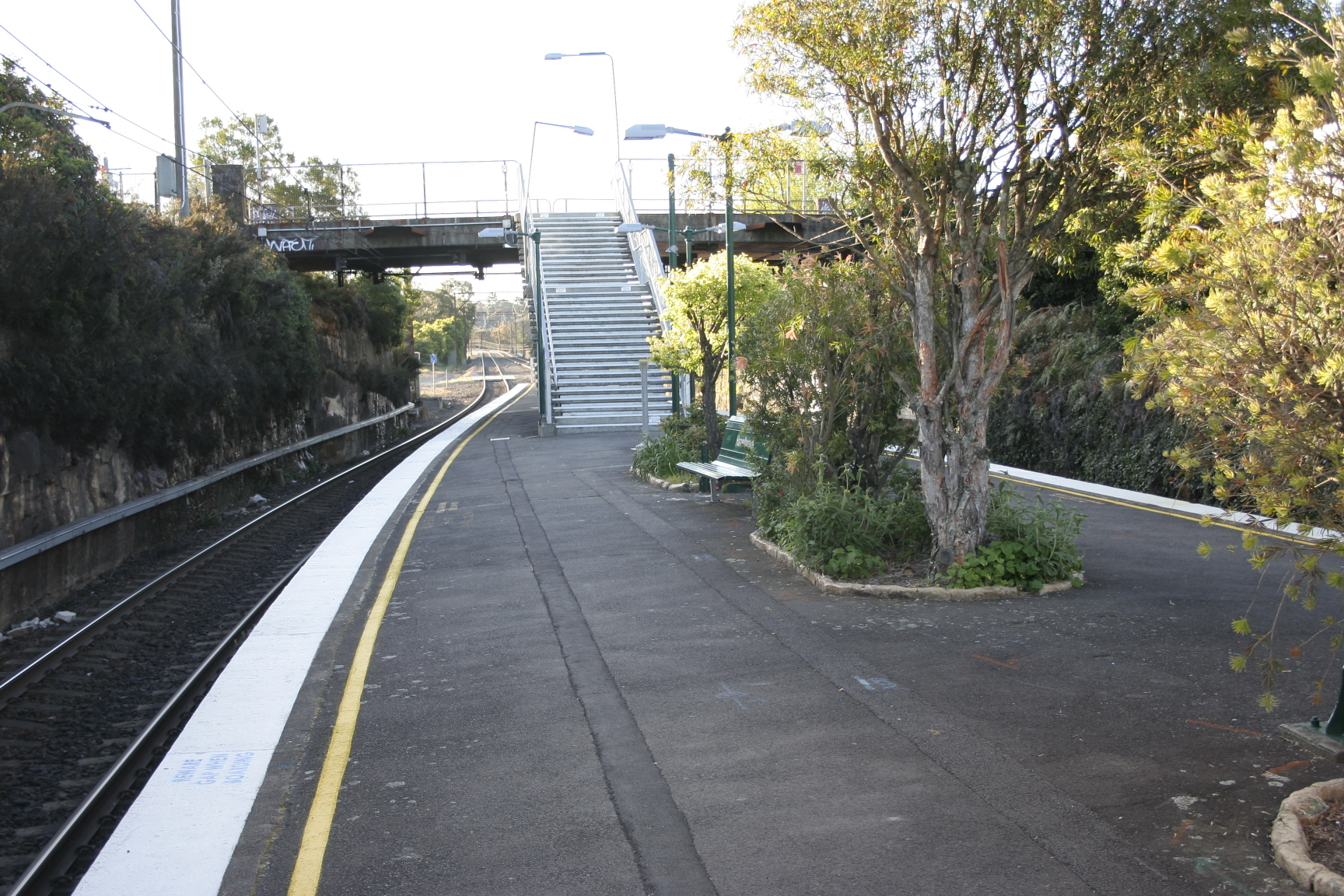

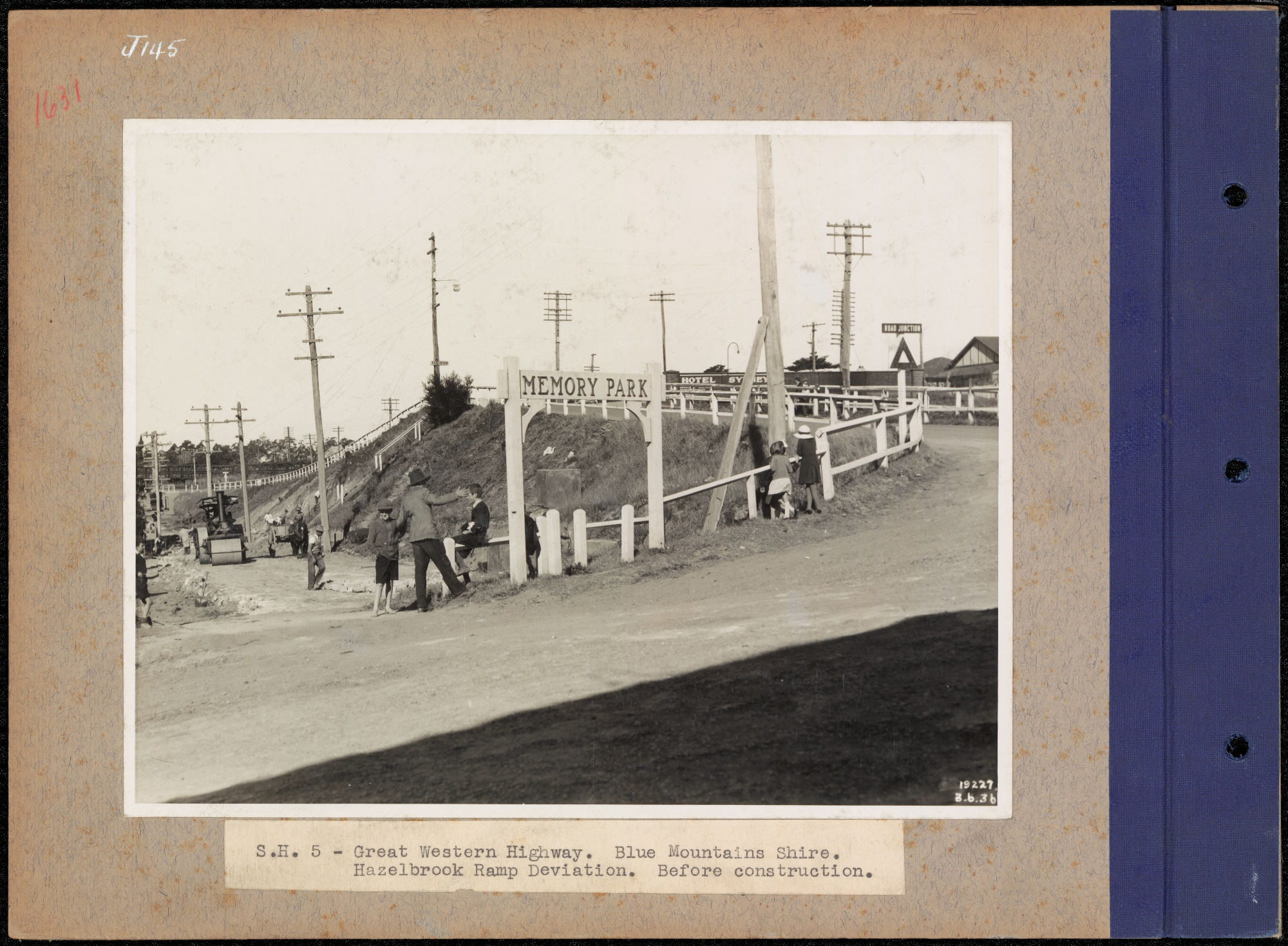

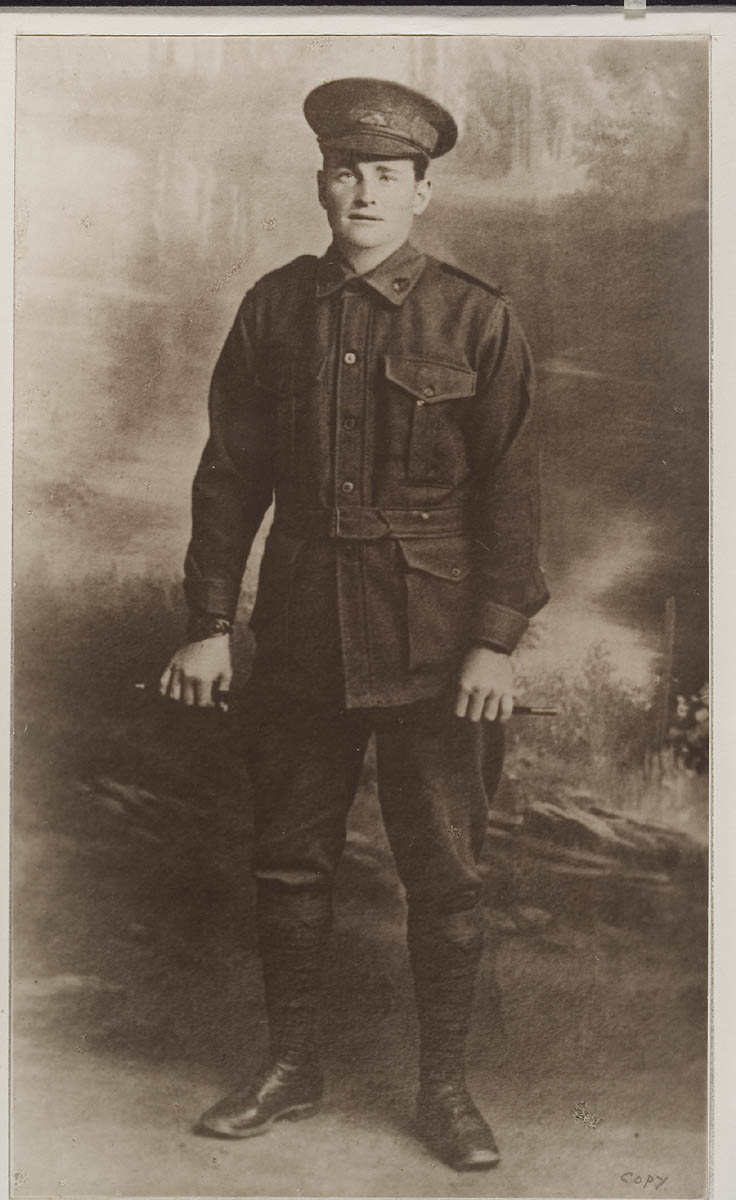

== See also ==
- Blue Mountains (New South Wales)
- Blue Mountains National Park
- Woodford, New South Wales
- Lawson, New South Wales
- Hazelbrook railway station
