= Central Tablelands =

- Region
- Country: Australia
- State: New South Wales
- LGA: Bathurst, Blayney, Lithgow, Mid-Western, Oberon, Orange

Government
  - State electorate: Bathurst, Dubbo, Orange
  - Federal division: Calare, Parkes
Regions around Central Tablelands
Northern Tablelands	Upper Hunter	Hunter
Central West	Central Tablelands	Blue Mountains
South West Slopes	South West Slopes	Southern Tablelands

The Central Tablelands in New South Wales, Australia, is a geographic area that lies between the Sydney Metropolitan Area and the Central Western Slopes and Plains. The Great Dividing Range passes in a north–south direction through the Central Tablelands and includes the Blue Mountains. The region shares borders with the Hunter, Central West Slopes and Plains, South West Slopes, Southern Tablelands, North Western Slopes and Plains, the Sydney Metropolitan Area and the Illawarra.

Several main State highways pass through the Central Tablelands including the Great Western Highway, Mitchell Highway, Golden Highway, Castlereagh Highway and the Mid-Western Highway. The main western railway line from Sydney passes through the Central Tablelands, east to west direction initially on the Blue Mountains railway line, then continuing with the Main Western Railway line.

The main towns within the Central Tablelands, listed by population, include Orange, Bathurst, Lithgow, Mudgee, Katoomba, Blayney, Oberon, Gulgong, and Portland.

== History ==
In their May 1813 trek explorers Blaxland, Wentworth, and Lawson set out to discover the inland to the west of Sydney, over the Blue Mountains. The group climbed the mountains and on reaching the top of the ridges they continued west to a point later named Mount Blaxland (south of present-day Rydal). This was the first access by Europeans to the area now known as the Central Tablelands. Governor Macquarie ordered a second expedition, in November 1813, led by government surveyor George Evans, this second expedition travelled further and reached the site now known as the city of Bathurst. The town of Orange was named by the explorer Thomas Mitchell, and his third expedition, south, began in this region, accompanied by a local Wiradjuri guide and interpreter Turandurey.

== Geology and Landforms ==
The Central Tablelands region of New South Wales lies largely within the Lachlan Fold Belt tectonic zone.

=== Eastern portion (surrounding Katoomba) ===
The eastern portion of the Central Tablelands covers the area known as the Blue Mountains to the west of the Sydney basin. The area is drained by many creeks and rivers, including Cox's River, Jenolan River, Kanangra River, and Kowmung River which in turn flow into the Hawkesbury-Nepean river system. The Blue Mountains are an extensive Triassic sandstone plateau rising to 1,100 metres (3,609 ft) near Mount Victoria. The Blue Mountains terminate in a north–south line of cliffs that form the eastern edge of the Hartley, Kanimbla and Megalong Valleys.

=== Western portion (surrounding Bathurst) ===
Two physical components comprise the Central Tablelands region surrounding Bathurst; the Bathurst Basin and the Tablelands areas. They are drained by the Macquarie, Turon, Fish and Campbells Rivers to the north and Abercrombie and Isabella Rivers to the south. The central basin area of the Bathurst area is mainly granite soils while in the north area sandstone, conglomerates, greywacke, siltstones, limestones and minor volcanos predominate. The south is more complex geology with siltstones, sandstones, greywacke, shales and chert, basalt and granite intrusions and embedded volcanic and limestones. Underlying Bathurst is the dominant feature of Bathurst granite (intruded in the Devonian period) and at Mount Panorama and Mount Stewart basalt occurs.

Topography of the region ranges from slightly undulating to rough and very steep country, approximately 30 km to the east of Bathurst is the folded and faulted sedimentary and metamorphosed formations of the Great Dividing Range which runs roughly north–south.

=== Northern portion (surrounding Mudgee) ===
Geology of the area surrounding Mudgee and Gulgong forms part of the north eastern margin of the Lachlan Fold Belt tectonic zone. This northern area is traversed by the Cudegong River which rises in the mountains of the Great Divide, flowing west into the Murray-Darling river system. At the head of the valley, to the east, high mountains are of volcanic origin, and capped in basalt lava flows deposited some 17 million years ago. Nullo Mountain is the most extensive, and Mount Coricudgy the loftiest at 1,256 metres (4,121 ft). The high mountainous eastern area is a spectacular landscape with basalt peaks, sandstone ravines and rainforest gorges. This high land falls to the west into wide basins of agricultural country. The Cudgegong River collects the fertile basalt enriched volcanics from the mountains and deposits them in the broad fertile alluvial flat agricultural lands to the west.

== Climate ==
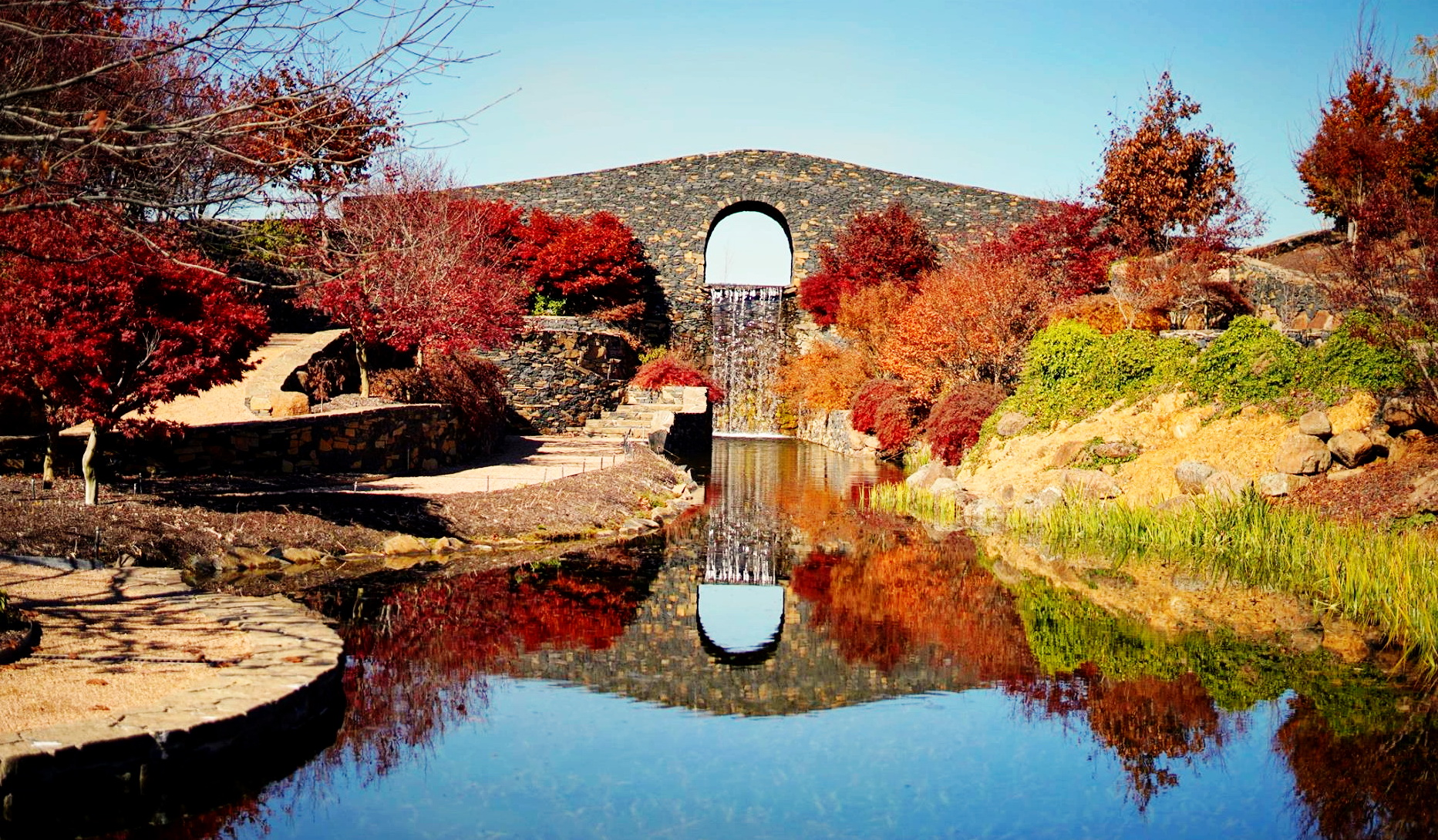
Mayfield Garden, Oberon in autumn

Due to its location and elevation 450–1395 metres above sea level, the Central Tablelands has four distinct seasons. Summer can be quite hot with temperatures exceeding 40 °C (104 °F) on the hottest days, although afternoons in summer tend to cool down and most summer nights are around 13 °C (55.4 °F). Autumn is when the district starts to cool down. Around April frosts start occurring and temperatures below 0 °C (32 °F) may also occur. The district tends to be quite windy in autumn and days sometimes struggle to reach 18 °C (64.4 °F). Winter is the coldest season and daytime temperatures struggle to get above 7 °C (44.6 °F). When the southwesterly airmasses pass through the region on winter nights the temperature can go as low as −8 °C (17.6 °F) and feel much colder. Severe frosts occur frequently during winter. In the higher parts over 1000 metres ASL, several snowfalls occur each winter. Spring is when the temperature starts to warm, although frosts and sometimes snow still occur in early spring. Around mid-spring the temperature can get as high as 24 °C (75.2 °F), sometimes even higher. Around spring all the crops and flowers start growing in the Central Tablelands. Nights in spring still frequently drop below 0 °C (32 °F).

The lower parts tend to be dry when it comes to rainfall, but much wetter on the Oberon Plateau and surrounds. Rain can be expected any day of the year but usually the heaviest rainfall is around October. The average rainfall for the district ranges between 600 and 1000 mm per year. Rainfall is subject to significant yearly variation.

The highest temperature in the Central Tablelands was 44.7 °C (112.5 °F) at Bathurst Gaol, in January 1878. The lowest temperature was −11.1 °C (12.0 °F) at Marrangaroo Defence, in July 2018.

== Naming ==
New South Wales can be divided into four broad landform components:

- the coastal regions fronting the Tasman Sea in the east of the State
- the highlands (elevated tablelands) which form part of the Great Dividing Range
- the western (inland) slopes of the highlands, which form the main agricultural region of the State
- the arid western plains

The four geographic components are then typically divided into north, central and southern areas based upon their location relative to Sydney.

This two-way subdivision gives rise to the generic pattern of regions:

- North Coast
- Central Coast
- South Coast
- Northern Tablelands
- Central Tablelands
- Southern Tablelands
- North-West Slopes
- Central Western Slopes
- South-West Slopes
- Western Plains

== See also ==
- Regions of New South Wales
