= Short-form content =

Small-scale video content

Short-form video format (featuring Endeavour docking at the ISS)

Short-form content, also known as short-form video, is a short video made from various sources such as films (both professional and amateur), television shows, and entertainment videos. The video is delivered and distributed over the Internet through short-form video platforms such as YouTube Shorts, TikTok, Instagram Reels, Vine, and Facebook Reels. Short-form content became popular among young people, gaining some popularity in the 2010s before becoming more mainstream in the 2020s.

Most short-form content is now found as video clips uploaded in the vertical format. They are up to a few minutes long (e.g., up to three minutes for YouTube Shorts content). Short-form content can be utilised for advertising, entertainment, education or journalism.

The increasing popularity of short-form dramas (also known as microdramas) has led to the emergence of streaming platforms specializing in delivering short-form series content.

== History ==
Short videos became popular in the 2010s, building a part of Internet culture by members of Generation Z and continuing with Generation Alpha.

Snapchat started allowing users to share 10-second videos in 2012. Vine, which was launched in 2013 and restricted videos to a maximum length of six seconds, helped short-form videos achieve mainstream popularity and gave rise to a new generation of public figures such as Kurtis Conner, David Dobrik, Danny Gonzalez, Drew Gooden, Liza Koshy, Shawn Mendes, Jake Paul, Logan Paul, and Lele Pons. Instagram responded to Vine's popularity by adding the ability to share 15-second videos in 2013, and has since expanded its video functionality with numerous additional features, including Reels.

Following Vine's closure in 2017, most of its notable users began making longer videos on YouTube. After TikTok merged with Musical.ly in 2018, TikTok became the most widely used short-form video app and has since become one of the world's most popular apps. In 2020, Vine co-founder Dom Hofmann launched Vine's intended successor Byte (later renamed Clash and then Huddles). In 2021, as a response to the ever-increasing competition presented by TikTok, YouTube launched YouTube Shorts to host videos up to a maximum length of 60 seconds. The run time was extended up to three minutes in October 2024. YouTube Shorts collectively earned over five trillion views within six months of inception.

== Business models of short-form video platforms ==
=== Advertising revenue ===
Advertising is the most basic profit model of short video platforms. Platforms achieve precision marketing through information flow advertising, short video interstitial advertising and brand cooperation promotion. For example, TikTok Ads allows brands to deliver targeted ads based on user interests, viewing behavior and social interactions to increase advertising conversion rates. However, as users' tolerance for advertising decreases, platforms are exploring more interactive and immersive advertising formats, such as AR filter ads and brand challenges.

=== Live broadcast rewards ===
The live broadcast function of short video platforms has become an important source of income for content creators. Users can reward anchors through virtual gifts while watching live broadcasts, and the platform will extract a certain percentage of the share. Douyin and Kuaishou in China, as well as Twitch and YouTube Live in the West, have adopted similar models. However, the live broadcast reward model is greatly affected by regional culture and regulatory policies, and may face policy restrictions in some countries.

=== Membership subscription ===
Some short video platforms have launched membership subscription services, such as YouTube Premium and TikTok's Live Subscription. Users pay a certain fee to enjoy ad-free, exclusive content and higher interactive rights. This model provides a stable source of income for the platform, but it still plays a supporting role in the short video ecosystem.

=== E-commerce live streaming ===
E-commerce live streaming is one of the key models for the commercialization of short video platforms. It combines the entertainment of short videos with the convenience of e-commerce, forming a business logic of "content is marketing, interaction is transaction". The process is first content creation and product display. The anchor or brand will introduce the product through live streaming, including trial, evaluation and promotion information. The second is real-time interaction. Users can interact with the anchor through comments, likes and questions to enhance the sense of trust in purchase and allow consumers to gain an immersive purchasing experience and emotional value in interpersonal relationships. The anchor can display the product in a variety of ways, such as product close-ups, trials, promotions, etc., and eliminate consumers' concerns and reservations through words, enhance their social presence and provide a positive emotional experience. Finally, one-click purchase and instant transaction. Users can directly click on the product link in the live broadcast to jump to the purchase page, shorten the decision path and improve the conversion rate.

==== Development trends ====
The Chinese market is in a leading position in the field of e-commerce live streaming. Platforms such as Douyin have formed a complete live e-commerce ecosystem. The sales revenue of various types of live broadcast e-commerce will reach one trillion yuan, and cultural and tourism enterprises are paying more and more attention to live broadcasting, demonstrating the huge potential of live e-commerce. Moreover, Douyin e-commerce relies on precise recommendation algorithms to provide brands and individual merchants with a stable source of traffic, enabling small and medium-sized merchants to achieve efficient sales. Although e-commerce live streaming has achieved great success in China, it still faces challenges in promoting it in the international market. However, some platforms are actively trying, such as TikTok Shop: TikTok took the lead in promoting the live streaming sales model in the Southeast Asian market, and piloted "TikTok Shop" in the UK market, allowing brands and influencers to sell goods through live streaming. There is also Amazon Live: Amazon launched the live streaming shopping function, combined with the platform's strong supply chain capabilities, trying to introduce live streaming shopping into the European and American markets.

==== Challenges and future development ====
Although the prospects for live streaming e-commerce in China are very broad and Chinese people already consider it a part of their daily lives, there are many difficulties in promoting it globally. Western consumers have a low acceptance and adaptability to "live streaming shopping" and are more accustomed to the traditional e-commerce model. And payment methods, logistics services and after-sales systems need to be improved to match the instant transaction needs of e-commerce live streaming. In the future, e-commerce live streaming is expected to become more popular in the global market and become one of the core profit models of short video platforms due to the advancement of AI recommendation algorithms, the development of cross-border e-commerce and the improvement of the social media ecosystem.

== Short-form video platforms and applications ==
Examples of short-form video platforms and apps:

- DramaBox: streaming app specializing in microdramas
- Facebook Reels: short video platform of social media platform Facebook
- FlexTV: microdrama app
- Instagram Reels: short video section of social media platform Instagram
- Kanta: global short video streaming platform owned by South Korea digital content corporation RIDI
- Likee: short video creation and sharing app for iOS and Android operating systems
- Moments: interactive social media app by WeChat that includes short videos
- My Drama: short vertical video episodic drama streaming platform
- ReelShort: microdrama video app owned by Crazy Maple Studio
- Sora: short video clips app by OpenAI
- TikTok: short video platform owned by ByteDance
- Triller: video creation and sharing social media app
- Vigloo: short video dramas streaming platform
- Viu Shorts: short video section of Viu's mobile app
- YouTube Shorts: short video section of YouTube

== Criticism ==
Short-form videos are linked to diminishing attention spans and mental health issues among young people. In research examining these concerns it was found that university students with short-form video addiction had greater difficulty concentrating and responded more frequently to distractions compared to university students without short-form video addiction. When sustained attention was required, the results became more prominent in short-form content addicted students, while the students without short-form content addiction had more consistent results. In addition to difficulties with attention, short-form video use has been shown to be associated with higher levels of mental health concerns, including depression, anxiety, stress, boredom, and loneliness. These associations are much stronger in individuals with problematic use of short-form video content rather than just routine use.

== Video clip ==
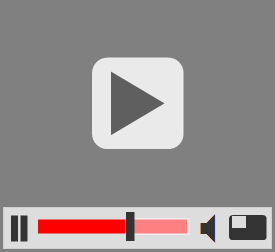
A detailed icon for video e.g. to link to video content on a website

Video clips are a form of short-form content that involves a small portion of a longer recording of a video (often from various sources such as movies (from both professional and amateur sources), television shows or entertainment videos) that is uploaded onto the Internet.

Video clips can be of any format, whether as standard video (using any available video resolution) or vertical video (the latter being commonly used for short-form content), and can be up to several minutes long depending on the content being used. Such content may include internet memes, out-of-context snippets, and many others. They can also be used to attract the public to the user's other accounts or other long-form contents. The term is also used more loosely to mean any video program, including a full program, uploaded onto a website or other medium.

Video clips appeared during the early days of the World Wide Web in the 1990s, and then grew in popularity in the 2000s with the creation of video sharing sites such as YouTube. They are popular among certain groups of people, including that of Millennials (aka Generation Y), Generation Z and Alpha, which helped to shape the modern Internet culture. By mid-2006, there were millions of video clips available online, with new websites springing up focusing entirely on offering free video clips to users. Many established corporate sites added the ability to clip existing video content on their websites.

While most of this content is non-exclusive and available on competing sites, some companies produce their own videos and do not need to rely on the work of outside companies or amateurs.

While some video clips are taken from established media sources, community and individually produced clips are more common. Between March and July 2006, YouTube grew from 30 to 100 million views of videos per day. One of the developments during that period were the BBC's iPlayer, which was released for open beta testing in July 2007.

=== Convergence with traditional media ===
The evolving market for video clips garnered interest from traditional movie studios. In 2006, the producers of Lucky Number Slevin, a film with Morgan Freeman, Lucy Liu and Bruce Willis, made an 8-minute clip for YouTube. Celebrities in traditional media have proven to confer more popularity in clip culture than most amateur video makers.

== Impact of video clips ==
=== Advertising ===
Video clips are a common form of advertising. With online entertainment sites delivering television programming content, free of charge, online video entertainment rose substantially in popularity. Video clips are also used in advertising by vloggers to promote products. The average ad goes for 15–30 seconds.

=== Rise of amateurs ===
Unlike traditional movies largely dominated by studios, video clips are supplied by non-professionals.

In 2005, Chinese students Huang Yixin and Wei Wei, later known as "Back Dorm Boys", lip-synced to a song by the Backstreet Boys in a video uploaded to some clip websites and quickly became renowned. They appeared on television shows and concerts, and they were also granted a contract by a media company in Beijing for lip-syncing.

In May 2006, The Economist reported that 90% of video clips on YouTube came from amateurs, a few of whom were young comedians. It, in effect, also brought up amateur talents.

An earlier celebrity was David Elsewhere, who was a talent at popping and liquiding. His performance to Kraftwerk's song Expo 2000 at the Kollaboration talent show in 2001 was widely viewed on the Internet, and this subsequently led to him being hired for TV commercials and music videos. Not only did video clips submerge into the world of TV commercials and music videos, but it also became a popular form of entertainment and a hobby for people called "Vloggers" (video blog creators).

=== Citizen journalism ===
Citizen journalism video reporting dates back as early as the development of camcorders, but all videos were screened by the local media outlets of the time. This was until its spread was aided by free upload websites in which censorship was limited to make a vast number of videos available to anyone who wanted to view them. Scenes were rarely broadcast on television, and many first-witnessed scenes have since become publicly available.

In December 2003, videos in Hong Kong showing the bullying in De La Salle School outraged the public and raised a wide concern on school violence that led to the arrest of 11 students, 7 of which were later dismissed in 2020.

Notably, in December 2004, tourist videos of the Indian Ocean earthquake and tsunami offered worldwide audiences the first scenes of the disaster.

== Vlog ==
From late 2005 to early 2006, a new form of blogging emerged called a vlog (i.e., video blog). Vlogs use videos as the primary content, which is often accompanied by supporting text, image, and additional metadata to provide context. Su Li Walker, an analyst with the Yankee Group, said that "like blogs, which have become an extension of traditional media, video blogs will be a supplement to traditional broadcasting". Regular entries are typically presented in reverse chronological order.

== See also ==
- Timeline of online video
- List of Internet phenomena
- Internet meme
- Media clip
- Screencast
- Video evidence
- Video sharing
- Quoting out of context
- GIF
