= Vertical video =

Video with portrait orientation

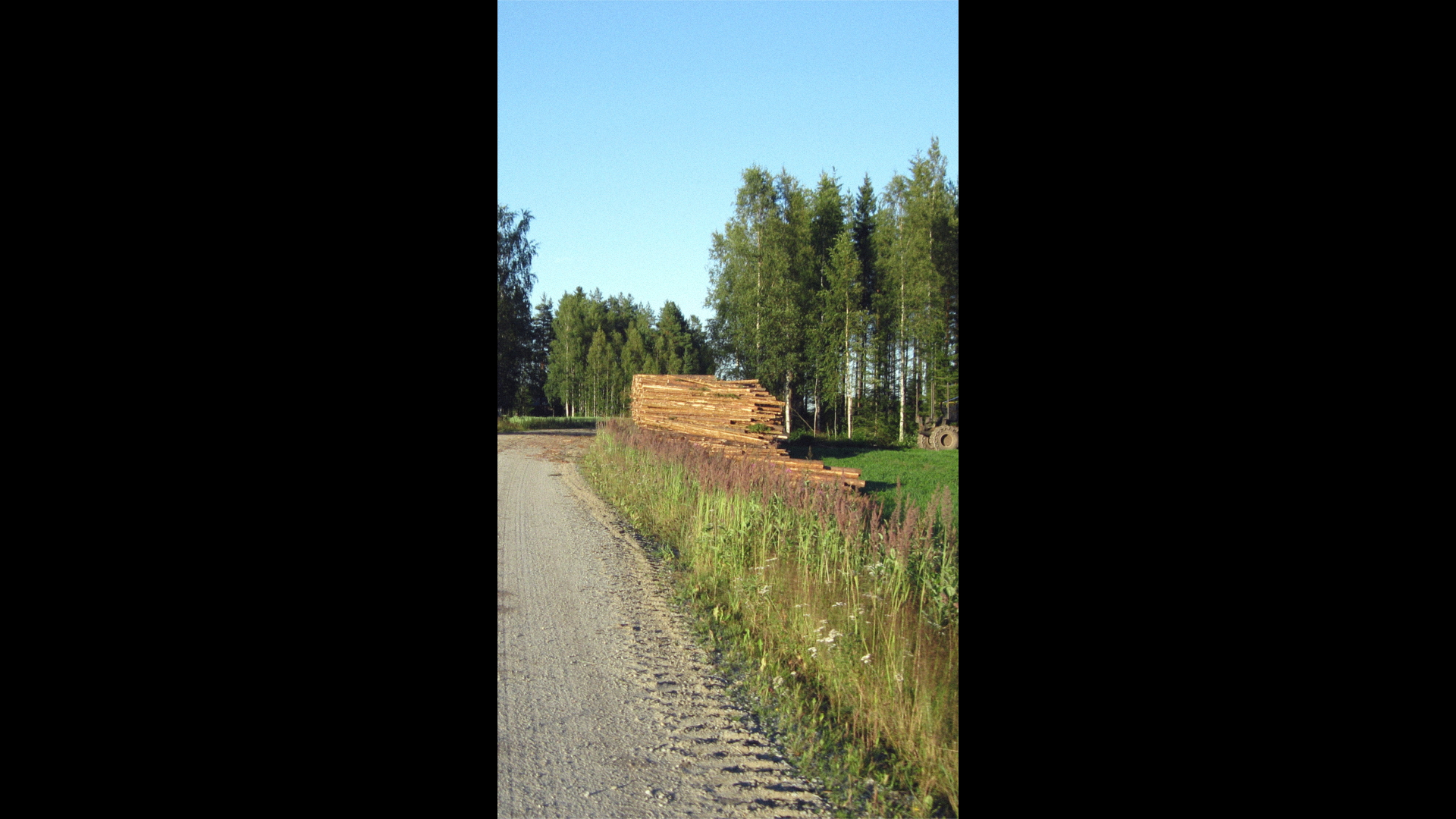
A simulated vertical video frame on widescreen

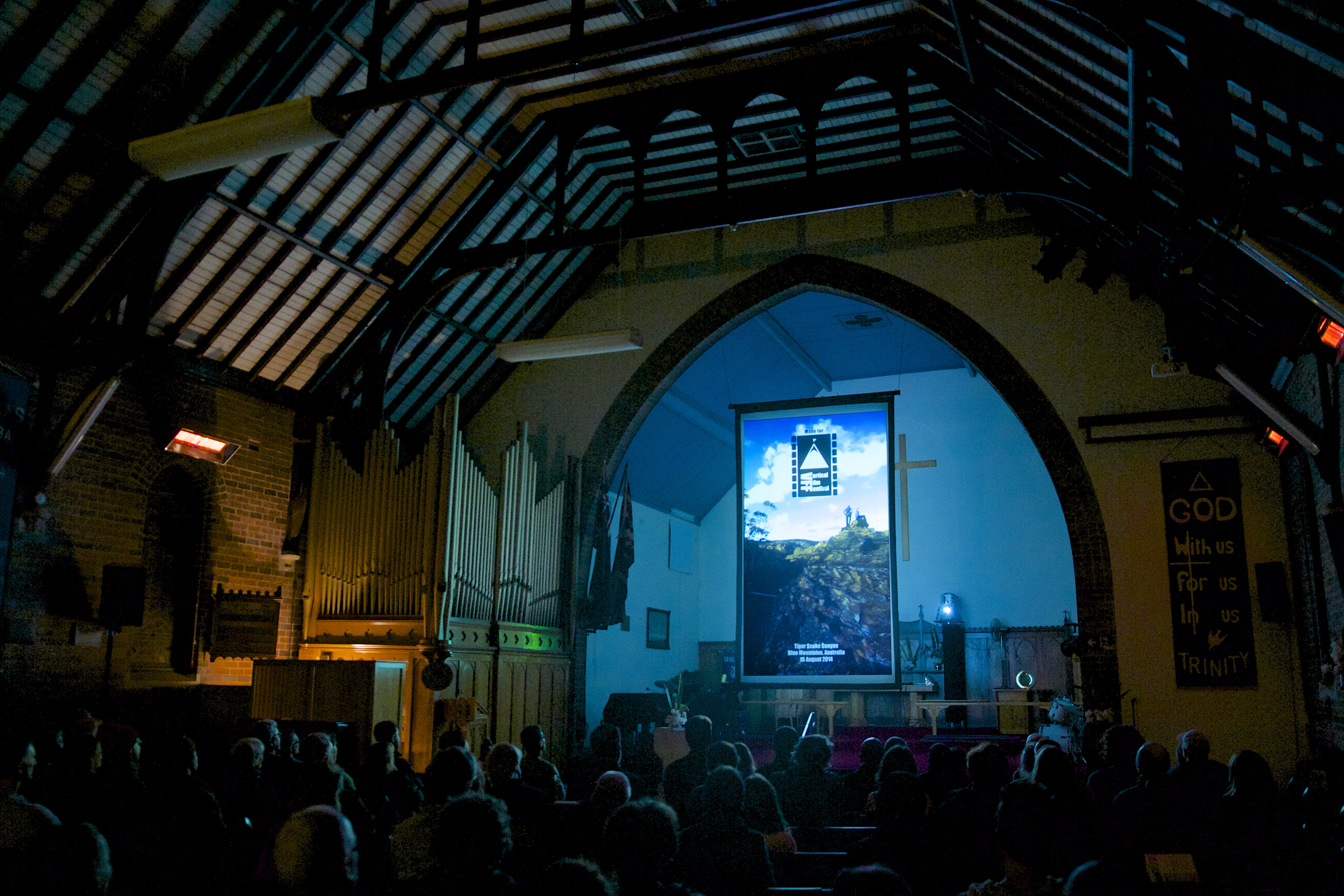
The first edition of the Vertical Film Festival, projected tallscreen 9:16 aspect ratio in St Hilda's Church, Katoomba in Australia's Blue Mountains, 17 October 2014

A vertical video is a video created either by a camera or computer that is intended for viewing in portrait mode, producing an image that is taller than it is wide. It thus sits in opposition to the multiple horizontal formats normalised by cinema and television, which trace their lineage from the proscenium theatre, Western landscape painting traditions, and the human visual field.

Vertical video has historically been shunned by professional video creators because it does not fit the aspect ratio of established moving image forms, such as film and television, as well as newer web-based video players such as YouTube, meaning that black spaces appeared on either side of the image. However, the popularity of mobile video apps such as Snapchat and especially TikTok, which use the more mobile-friendly portrait format, have led to an increase in the production of vertical videos by advertising companies.

== History ==
=== Historical uses ===
Vertical filmmaking has aesthetic roots reaching back at least to the tall painted frescoes and stained-glass windows of Christian churches. The world’s first moving images of a cat (Falling Cat, Étienne-Jules Marey, 1894) were shot vertically. When the first motion picture screenings were held in 1895, however, the format was standardised horizontally (though at 4:3 aspect ratio, the images were closer to a square format than to widescreen). Noting that the new cinematic art had taken on the old strictures of the theatre, on 17 September 1930 Russian filmmaker and theorist Sergei Eisenstein addressed the Technicians Branch of the Academy of Motion Picture Arts and Sciences in Hollywood, calling for a cinema screen of variable aspect ratio (a "dynamic square"), one which would be able to cope with whatever compositional format the filmmaker chose, including a vertical framing. He lost the argument to a screen format standardised at a new Academy ratio (1.375:1) and vertical filmmaking has largely remained confined to experimental artists of the Expanded Cinema movement, which flourished during the 1960s and 70s. It also made appearances in various World's Fair films such as In the Labyrinth in Montréal in 1967.

If artists working with cinematic film were constrained by physical limitations from tipping the apparatus, the video medium made rotating the camera and/or projector somewhat easier. Artist Bill Viola frequently employs tall-screen video. In 1984, musician and artist Brian Eno created Thursday Afternoon, a series of "video paintings" presented in vertical format.

The 2005 music video for Imogen Heap's song "Hide and Seek" was shot by Joel Peissig in portraiture, one of the first music videos in this format. He felt that the vertical frame "complimented her face and her solitude"; as he used 35 mm film to shoot the music video, he also noticed that putting the camera on its side produced better-looking light streaks.

Indian composer and record producer A. R. Rahman's 2007 international single Pray for Me Brother, that was an initiative by Nokia Corporation, was then released as a vertical video. The song was conceived as an anti-poverty anthem for the Millennium Goals for the United Nations.

By 2013, a number of independent film and video makers had made the creative jump to vertical formats for narrative films despite the limitations of using professional capture and projection apparatuses in vertical orientation. The first festival of specially commissioned tall-screen films, Sonic Acts' Vertical Cinema, was screened at Kontraste Dark As Light Festival in Austria in October 2013; whilst the world's first open competition for vertical film and video, the Vertical Film Festival was held one year later in Katoomba, New South Wales, Australia. Both organisations project onto large-format vertical cinema screens in suitably tall-roofed venues, but there have also been a number of online initiatives to encourage filmmakers to explore the creative potential of the vertical frame, as well as dedicated groups and channels on Vimeo. Similar exhibits took place in March 2015 at South by Southwest in Austin, Texas and in November 2016 at the Vertifilms festival in Prague.

=== Embrace of vertical video ===
Vertical video has presented significant challenges to video publishers, as many of them have been traditionally geared for horizontal video. In October 2015, social video platform Grabyo, which is used by major sports federations such as La Liga and the National Hockey League (NHL), launched technology to help video publishers adapt horizontal 16:9 video into mobile formats such as vertical and square.

Mary Meeker, a partner at Silicon Valley venture capital firm Kleiner Perkins Caufield & Byers, highlighted the growth of vertical video viewing in her 2015 Internet Trends Report - growing from 5% of video viewing in 2010 to 29% in 2015. Vertical video ads like Snapchat's are watched in their entirety nine times more than landscape video ads. Snapchat, DMG Media and WPP plc formed a content marketing agency called Truffle Pig in June 2015 that would be focused on creating content for vertical screens. By 2015, vertical video was rapidly supported by many major social platforms including Facebook and Twitter. YouTube introduced a vertical video viewing format compatible with mobile screens for Android in 2015; the new format was rolled out to all mobile devices two years later.

By the late 2010s, many online video platforms began embracing the use of vertical video due to the growing use of mobile devices. In 2018, Instagram launched a vertical video application, IGTV. The same year, YouTube introduced the capability for vertical video without black bars on its desktop website and in social media embeds. YouTube also unveiled a new vertical video ad format in 2018, saying "more than 70 percent of YouTube watch time happens on mobile devices". In March 2018, streaming media company Netflix announced the introduction of vertically-oriented 30-second previews of shows and movies to its platform; the company also cited the use of mobile devices as inspiration. Vertical video has become more commonly used by news media, both for organizational social media profiles and increasingly on their own websites.

Capitalizing on the rise of smartphones, whose default orientation is vertical, some music artists began releasing platform-exclusive vertical music videos. These vertical videos are often shown on Snapchat's "Discover" section or within Spotify playlists.

=== Vertical short dramas ===
In China, vertical video has also fueled the emergence of duanjus (short dramas), a booming genre of ultra-brief serialized storytelling optimized for mobile screens. Typically ranging from 1 minute to 2 minutes per episode, these duanjus are designed for fast-paced vertical consumption, often featuring melodramatic plots, cliffhangers, and emotionally charged themes such as love, betrayal, or revenge.

Duanjus are primarily distributed through specialized apps and platforms such as ReelShort, DramaBox, and Tiktok, and are often monetized through a pay-per-episode or freemium model. With low production costs, fast turnaround, and high user retention, duanju have quickly become a staple of mobile-first entertainment for Gen Z and young adult audiences. By 2024, platforms like ReelShort and DramaBox began actively introducing short dramas to global audiences, particularly in North America, Southeast Asia, and parts of Europe. In 2024 alone, the genre attracted hundreds of millions of views across China, Southeast Asia, and increasingly, Western markets.

=== Hollywood recognition ===
Hollywood is also investing in the narrative video format. SAG-AFTRA created a new contract enabling union actors to work in Vertical Microdramas in 2025. The WGA clarified to the Writer's Guild Members that they are able to write for verticals associated with a union contract. Studios are also looking for ways to enter the microdrama market. Fox Studios announced their acquisition of the company Holywater, which operates in the vertical video platform My Drama.

== See also ==
- Pillarbox – A visual effect which is often how vertical videos are rendered on television programming either on non-fiction news or magazine programming, or fictionalized to show a phone interface or camera image on-screen
