= Animaker =

Video animation software company

Animaker Inc.
- Type: Private
- Industry: Video animation
- Founded: 2014
- Founder: RS Raghavan; Loganathan Kodiyarasu
- Headquarters: San Francisco, California, United States
- Area served: Worldwide
- Key people: RS Raghavan (CEO)
- Services: SaaS video animation software
- Website: www.animaker.com

Animaker is a cloud-based DIY video animation software that allows users to create animated videos using avatars and templates. Animaker was launched in 2014 by RS Raghavan and Loganathan Kodiyarasu. In 2017, Animaker became the first tool to launch an animated vertical video creator. The name "Animaker" is a portmanteau of "animation" and "maker".

is a cloud-based video and animation software first launched in an open beta version in 2014 by RS Raghavan and his friend Loganathan Kodiyarasu. The software was developed to decrease the time it took to make corporate instructional and explainer videos. In February 2015, the software was officially launched based on a freemium model that allowed users a free account option. It had significant early traction, collecting 500,000 subscribers in the first eighteen months.

The company was bootstrapped without significant venture funding and was quite successful, growing to four million users pre-covid. Early corporate clients included FedEx, Cisco, Ford, and Dell. The Covid-19 pandemic created a demand for short form video and demand skyrocketed with users increasing five hundred percent to twenty million in 2020. The growth in users resulted in significant growth across the company with employees increasing from 50 to 210 over the same period and, ARR increasing to $25M in 2022.

After Covid in 2023, the company launched AI text-to-video creator software, Steve AI, setting the company as an early leader in the AI text-to-video platforms. The platform has a library of styles, assets and animated avatars to help professionals and content creators deliver professional quality marketing and instructional videos. The core feature, text-to-video, can pull content from a 100 million stock assets, 70,000 icons, 30,000 music tracks and Getty Images. Smart Move Technology, Animaker's proprietary animation technology allows avatars to move and generate realistic animations that allow features like lip-sync-to-audio and natural gestures.

== Software ==
Animaker is a cloud-based DIY animation video maker and AI-powered platform that enables users to create professional-quality animated videos and visual stories without needing technical expertise or expensive production teams. The software supports multiple animation styles including 2D animation, infographics, whiteboard animation, typography, and cartoon styles, along with tools for customizing characters’ appearances, actions, expressions, and lip-syncing to audio. Users can add voiceovers through text-to-speech in multiple languages and accents, royalty-free music, sound effects, or their own recordings, and easily edit scenes with trimming, transitions, effects, and auto-subtitling.

Animaker operates entirely in the browser as a cloud-based tool, requiring no software installation or downloads, and includes collaboration features for team workspaces along with direct publishing options to social media or various export formats. The platform also includes Steve.AI, an AI-patented text-to-video tool developed by the same creators that automatically generates complete animated videos from text prompts, scripts, PDFs, or audio inputs, handling animations, voice synthesis, avatars, stock assets, and scene assembly with generative AI.

== Reception ==
Animaker has received generally positive reviews praising its ease of use for beginners and wealth of features for marketing and instructional videos. As of 2026, it holds a 4.7/5.0 rating on G2.
