= Linda Walker (character) =

Character from Chinese drama series

- The Heiress Who Won With Brains character
- Created by: Jian Fei Bao Zi
- Portrayed by: Zhang Yingfei

In-universe information
- Title: Intelligence quotient (IQ) of 180; called an "academic weapon"
- Occupation: Student
- Nationality: Chinese

Linda Walker (Chinese name: 林思望; Lin Si Wang) is a fictional character and the side protagonist of the Chinese vertical micro-drama series The Heiress Who Won With Brains. (Note: It is also known by another titled The Genius Real Heiress, or The Real Heiress Is a Top Student.) The character was played by Chinese actress Zhang Yingfei. She gained online popularity in the Philippines for her intelligence quotient of 180 and a record-breaking score of 719 in a mock exam.

== Fictional character biography ==
=== Season one ===
Linda Walker (Note: Originally 林思望 (Lin SiWang)) comes from a poor family in Brookshire. (Note: Originally Shanhe in central China.) She possesses an intelligence quotient (IQ) of 180. People call her an "academic weapon" because of her strong academic record.

She finds out that she was the real daughter of the wealthy Lewis family in the Capital City. (Note: Originally Beijing) She had been switched at birth with Nancy (Note: Originally 苏挚意 (Su Zi Yhi)) (played by Che Chao Yan), who had been raised by the Lewis family for 18 years. Upon returning to her real parents, Linda faces tension inside the household, as Nancy resents her presence and the family shows clear favoritism toward the daughter they had long believed to be theirs.

Linda remains determined to reach her goals. As the rightful daughter of the Lewis family, she secures a residency permit (hukou) in Capital City, which allows her to study at a prestigious university. She proves her intelligence when she scores 719 points on a difficult mock exam, well above the usual 400 to 500 points most students earn. She also rejects the romantic advances of Ethan Miller, the sweet boy next door, and focuses on her self-growth.

=== Season two ===
Linda has now become the CEO of her own company. She also reconciles with Nancy and helps her grow as a person.

== Portrayal ==
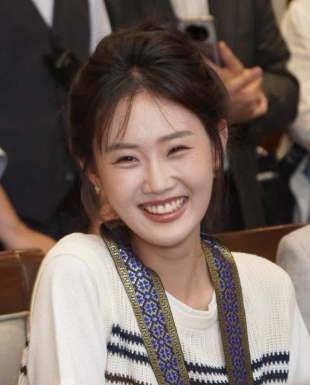
Zhang Yingfei in 2026

The character was played by Chinese actress Zhang Yingfei (born 2004). Yingfei graduated from the Central Academy of Drama and began her acting career in 2024. She gained rapid fame for her role as Linda Walker in the short drama, first released in China in September 2025. The character's name was changed from Lin SiWang to Linda Walker for the English-dubbed version of the series.

== Reception ==
The character became popular in the Philippines for her intelligence and courage in standing up to her rivals. Yingfei's portrayal of the role also went viral on social media platforms like TikTok, YouTube, and Dailymotion. The Philippine Star noted that her character, shown as smart and determined, inspired memes, fan videos, and funny posts, especially in the Philippines. She has recently been described by many as an "academic inspiration" after demonstrating exceptional intelligence and a strong drive to rise above her circumstances.
