= ReelShort =

Chinese video streaming application

- Developer: Crazy Maple Studio
- Release: August 2022; 4 years ago
- Operating system: Android, iOS
- Platform: Mobile app
- Type: Video on demand, Short-form video
- License: Proprietary
- Website: reelshort.com

ReelShort is a Chinese short-form video streaming app specializing in duanju (microdrama). It is owned by Crazy Maple Studio, which is backed and partially owned by Beijing-based digital publisher COL Group.

ReelShort's short dramas emphasize rapid plot twists, exaggerated emotional conflicts, and minimal character development. The production values are notably low, with simple sets, costumes, and a cast of predominantly unknown actors.

== Background ==
Despite the failure of similar short-format television platforms in the United States, such as the closure of Quibi in 2020, it has become a popular format in China. Initially filling a void created by movie theater closures during the COVID-19 pandemic, duanju became popular with Chinese viewers seeking quick entertainment. ReelShort was founded in August 2022 to introduce duanju to an international audience.

In January 2024, French outlets including France Inter, France Info, Midi Libre and Courrier International introduced ReelShort as the "TikTok of series," marking its first broad media coverage in France.

== Production ==
Crazy Maple Studio, the production company behind ReelShort, it was founded with the intention of introducing duanjus to an international audience. The studio maintains an additional office in Shenzhen, China.

== Business model ==
ReelShort uses a virtual currency system where users can purchase coins to unlock additional episodes of their shows. These coins can be acquired by watching advertisements within the app or by purchasing them directly.

Reelshort has seen a 992% increase in downloads between 2023 and 2024, from 3.4 million in Q1 2023 to 37 million in early 2024.

In 2025, the app reportedly reached over 370 million downloads and generated $700 million in revenue.

== Programs ==
- Move Aside! I’m the Final Boss starring Adam Daniel
- You Fired a Tech Genius
- Don't Miss Me When I'm Gone
- Fated to My Forbidden Alpha
- Married at First Sight
- Never Divorce a Secret Billionaire Heiress
- Snatched a Billionaire to Be My Husband
- Son-in-Law's Revenge
- The CEO's Contract Wife
- The Double Life of My Billionaire Husband
- True Luna
- True Heiress vs. Fake Queen Bee
- Maid for my Nemesis
- The Virgin's Bucket List
- Love Me Two Times
- Daddy December
- Breaking the Ice
- The Senator's Son
- Saved by the Sexy Cowboy
- Wings of Fire: The Dragon Slayer Is My Ex-Lover
- The Cursed Alpha's Mute Bride
- Mommy Don’t Cry, Daddy is Sorry
- Summer Situationship
- The Lost Son Returns as the Duke (in production)

== See also ==
- Duanju
- Hongguo Duanju
- DramaBox
