= The Blue Mountains Advertiser =

Weekly Australian newspaper

The Blue Mountains Advertiser was a weekly English language newspaper published in Katoomba, New South Wales, Australia.

The paper, published from 1939 to 1978, changed names several times in its history.

== History ==
Title	Dates
Springwood Sentinel	
Blue Mountains Courier	1960

The Blue Mountains Advertiser was a weekly paper that began publication in 1939, though no early issues are extant. It was established by James Robert Wighton, a former compositor with the Daily, and Cecil Thomas Roberts, and the early issues were printed at Parramatta. From issue No.20 (19 January 1940), however, it was published by Wilfrid Mason and printed at the Daily office, 23 Parke Street, Katoomba. Its circulation encompassed virtually the whole of the Blue Mountains, from Glenbrook (and later Emu Plains) to Mount Victoria. In June 1942 Mason's name disappeared from the paper and the publisher was listed simply as "Blue Mountains Daily Pty., Ltd." Sometime during the period January - July 1948 the paper began to be printed in Parramatta again, at the office of Cumberland Newspapers. On 4 October 1948 The Advertiser moved to 134 Katoomba Street and the Parke Street office, after such a long newspaper history, was finally closed and the plant dispersed. From this date a succession of companies were listed as proprietors: "The Blue Mountain Advertiser Co." (to April 1949); "Blue Mountains Newspaper Co." (to c. 1957); "Summit Newspapers" (from c. 1957 to October 1965). From October 1965 the Advertiser was printed and published by Cumberland Newspapers, Parramatta, with the local office remaining at 134 Katoomba Street, Katoomba.

== Digitisation ==
The Blue Mountains Advertiser has been digitised as part of the Australian Newspapers Digitisation Program project of the National Library of Australia.

== See also ==
- List of newspapers in New South Wales
- List of newspapers in Australia
