= Zhang Yingfei =

Chinese actress (born 2004)

- 张颖菲
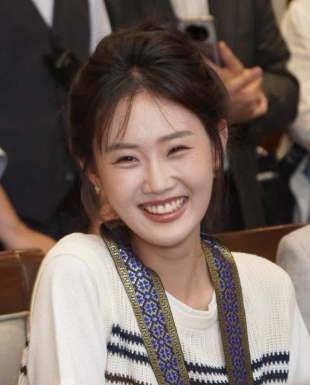
- Zhang in 2026
- Born: Zhang Yingfei; June 13, 2004 (age 22)
- Other name: Fifi
- Education: Central Academy of Drama
- Occupation: Actress
- Years active: 2024–present

Chinese name
- Simplified Chinese: 张颖菲
- Hanyu Pinyin: Zhāng Yǐngfēi

Zhang Yingfei (Chinese: 张颖菲; born June 13, 2004) is a Chinese actress. She made her acting debut in the 2024 period drama The Young Brewmaster's Adventure. She is best known for portraying Lin Siwang (林思望), internationally known as Linda Walker, in the 2025 vertical micro-drama series The Real Heiress Is a Top Student.

== Early life and education ==
Zhang was born on June 13, 2004, in China. Zhang is known by the nickname "Fifi", which she uses as her English name.

Zhang studied at the Central Academy of Drama in Beijing and graduated with a Bachelor of Arts degree in Musical Theater in 2025. While studying at the academy, she participated in stage productions, including the graduation performance A Dream of Cooling Off Under the Rice Plants, staged at the Experimental Theatre of the Central Academy of Drama in December 2024.

On Fast Talk with Boy Abunda in June 2026, she said that she does not consider herself naturally gifted and instead attributes her achievements to hard work and perseverance. She also stated that she was single.

== Career ==
During her sophomore year, Zhang was offered 5,000 yuan a day by a short drama production team to play the female lead. The offer surprised her, as she had previously only earned 1,000 yuan for each musical performance and 200 yuan for rehearsals. Later, she declined the offer since she was still filming a medium-length drama and was concerned about the reputation of vertical dramas. Zhang made her screen debut in the period drama The Young Brewmaster's Adventure in 2024.

In September 2025, she appeared as the female protagonist Lin Siwang in the vertical drama The Real Heiress is a Top Student (Note: Released internationally as The Heiress Who Won with Brains.), a role that brought her wider recognition. Zhang pushed back against the perceived low reputation of short dramas, saying that whatever the medium, "the core focus is always on acting". The success of The Real Heiress is a Top Student earned her enough money to cover her rent in Beijing. She also reappeared as the same character in the second season of the series in November. Released internationally under titles such as The Heiress Who Won with Brains, the series became one of the most successful Chinese microdramas of the year, which surpassing 1 billion views within a week of its release and more than 2 billion views within a month of its release in Hongguo. The series became especially popular in the Philippines, where viewers knew the character by the English name Linda Walker. Zhang also joked about online speculation regarding the possibility that her character is AI-generated, saying "I am not an AI".

In December 2025, she subsequently appeared in the microdrama She Just Wants to Make Money After Accidentally Entering an Elite School, in which she played Yunling. Around the same time, she also appeared in the short drama The Truly Wicked Maid Has the Villain Role Locked In with actress Xiong Anni.

In January 2026, Zhang starred in the vertical drama Promise You Ten Thousand Rains, which was filmed in Taiyuan in Shanxi Province. In April 2026, she also starred in a lead role in the 2026 short drama The Girl from the Stars with actor Li Zeyu. In June, she starred in the vertical drama She Went to the City to Find Her Parents, and She's No Nonsense.

== Philanthropy ==
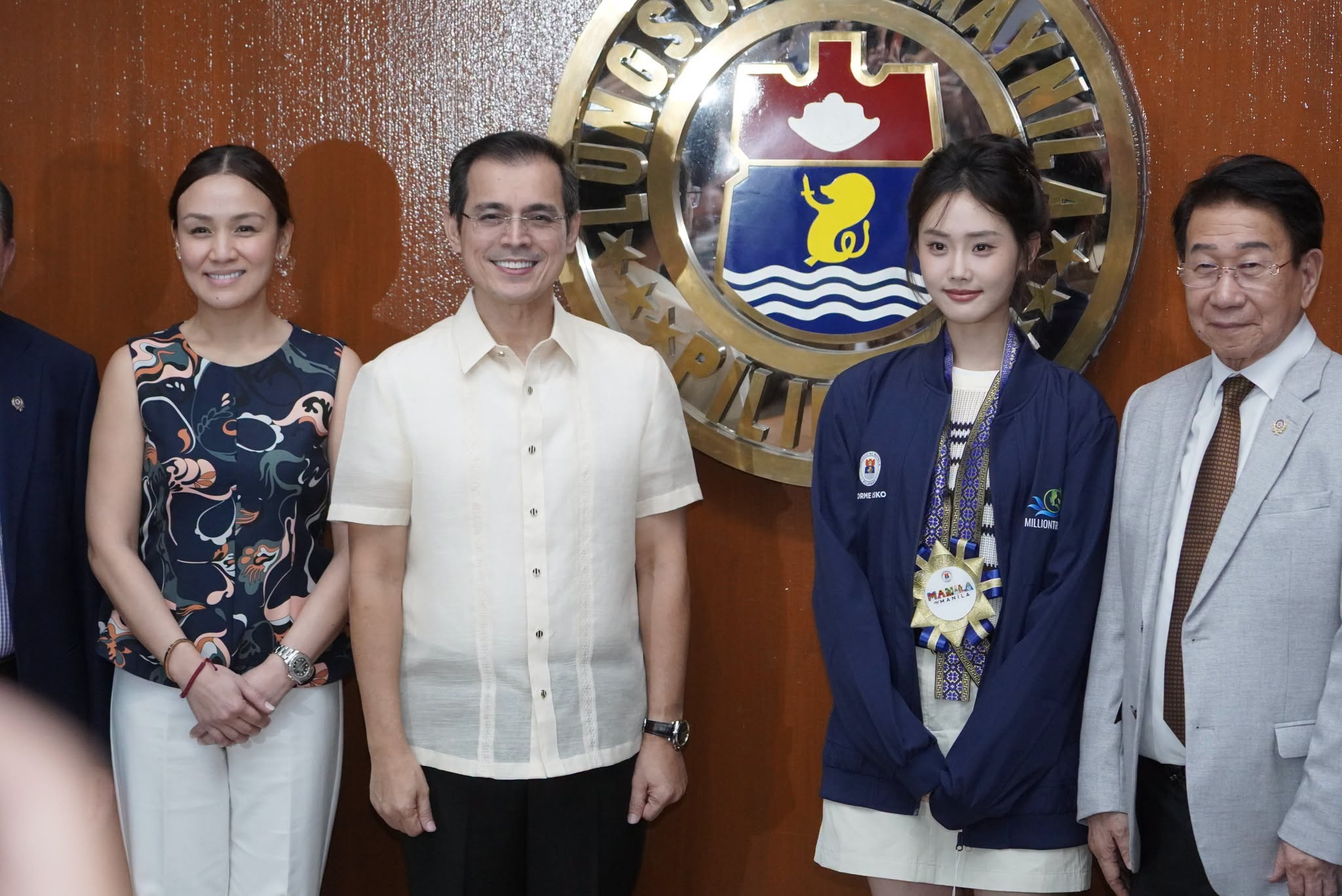
Zhang (right) meets with Manila Mayor Isko Moreno (left) in 2026

On June 8, 2026, Zhang arrived in Manila at the behest of the Federation of Filipino-Chinese Chambers of Commerce and Industry, Inc. (FFCCCII). She joined Philippine government officials at an outreach program in Quezon City High School where students received school supplies and daily necessities. Zhang also gave an inspirational message encouraging young people to pursue education.

During the visit, she toured Intramuros and Binondo, appeared on It's Showtime, Unang Hirit, and Fast Talk with Boy Abunda, and attended a media conference in Quezon City. She also met Manila Mayor Francisco "Isko Moreno" Domagoso and Quezon City Mayor Joy Belmonte during her stay. She returned to China on June 11, 2026.

== Filmography ==
=== Television series ===
Year	Title		Role	Ref.
Year	English	Chinese	Role	Ref.
2024	The Young Brewmaster's Adventure	少年白马醉春风	Black-robed lady	

=== Web series ===
Year	Title		Role	Ref.
Year	English	Chinese	Role	Ref.
2025	Welcome to Haolaiwu	欢迎来到好来屋		
2025	The Real Heiress Is a Top Student	真千金她是学霸	Lin Siwang	
2025	The Real Heiress Is a Top Student 2	真千金是学霸2	Lin Siwang	
2025	The Truly Wicked Maid Has the Villain Role Locked In	真恶仆她拿稳反派剧本	Luo He	
2025	She Just Wants to Make Money After Accidentally Entering an Elite School	誤入貴族學校她只想搞錢	Yunling	
2026	Promise You Ten Thousand Rains	许你万霖	Sumian	
2026	Blue Mist	青雾		
2026	Her Blonde Younger Brother Helps Her Rise to the Top	黄毛弟弟扶姐上青云	Fu Shengnan	
2026	The Girl from the Stars	来自星星的她	Ruan Tang	
2026	She Went to the City to Find Her Parents, and She's No Nonsense	进城找亲爸亲妈，她超级不好惹	Chuman	

=== Films ===
Year	Title		Role	Ref.
Year	English	Chinese	Role	Ref.
2026	The Poor Man's Guide to Rising to Power	穷鬼上位手册	Li Qiong	
