= Vigloo =

Microdrama streaming service

Vigloo (Korean: 비글루) is a South Korean short-form video microdrama, also known as drama, streaming platform owned by SpoonLabs, with headquarters in Seoul. It provides content produced in South Korea, Japan, and the United States. Vigloo produced the first AI-created short-form drama in South Korea.

== History ==
Vigloo launched in July 2024. After receiving an equity investment of $86 million (₩120 billion) by South Korean video game company Krafton in September 2024, Vigloo expanded to the U.S. In January 2025, Vigloo unveiled its first in-house produced drama, Xs Who Want to Kill: Adultery Investigation Unit. Vigloo had been testing the use of AI in post-production and visual effects, and in October 2025 released two original dramas produced entirely with AI. It adapted its live action Japanese short-form drama Boyfriend Search Project – Kissing 5 Men into the first short-form animation series made with AI technology in South Korea.

Of the top free entertainment iOS apps in South Korea, Vigloo ranks Number 3 as of January 2026.

== Service ==
=== Content ===
Vigloo offers both original and licensed content. It partnered with Passionflix to repackage the latter's original series The Secret Life of Amy Bensen into 35 vertical "bite-sized episodes". The most popular genre is romance, such as romantasy.

=== Business Model ===
Vigloo is available around the world, providing subtitles in nine languages, including Korean, English, and Japanese. Fifty percent of Vigloo's revenue comes from the U.S. Vigloo operates on a freemium model, where viewers can try several episodes and then can choose to continue by subscription or in-app purchases. As of September 2025, 70% of Vigloo viewers were over 35 years old.

=== Microdramas ===
Emerging during the early COVID period in China, microdramas have grown into a 7-billion-dollar market with dozens of dedicated platforms now operating. Although the format first expanded across Asia, short-form scripted content optimized for mobile viewing is increasingly being produced and watched in markets worldwide.

== Series ==
- A Vampire in the Alpha's Den
- Fight for Love
- Matrimoney
- Signed, Sealed, Deceived by My Billionaire Mailboy
- Spring Break Bucket List
- Stake to the Heart

== See also ==
- TikTok
