= Winter Magic =

Winter Magic may refer to:

- Winter Magic Festival, a community festival in Katoomba, New South Wales, Australia
- Winter Magic (album), a Christmas album by Hayley Westenra
- "Winter Magic" (song), a 2011 single by Kara
