= Vertical Film Festival =

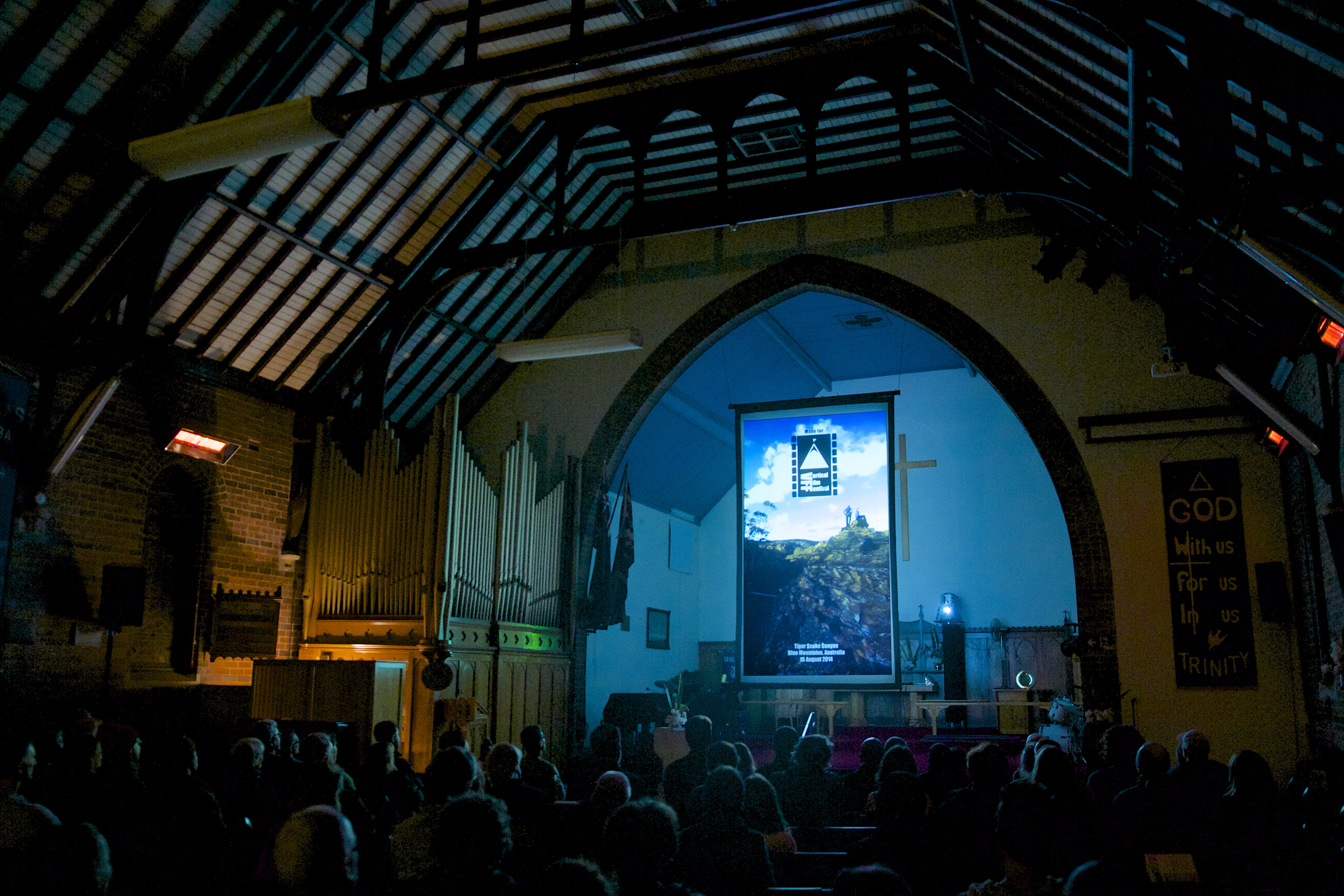
- The first edition of the Vertical Film Festival, projected in tall-screen 9:16 aspect ratio at St Hilda's Church, 17 October 2014.
- Location: Katoomba, New South Wales, Australia
- Founded: 2014
- Language: English
- Website: vertical.video

The Vertical Film Festival (VFF) is a film festival held in Katoomba, New South Wales, Australia. Established in 2014, the Festival was conceived to encourage exploration of vertical film and video. This nascent format is variously referred to as tall-screen, portrait format, 9:16 aspect ratio or simply vertical video for short. The VFF was the first worldwide competition to be held for vertical videos and has since become a biennial event with public screenings in suitably vertical venues.

The Festival has been widely cited for its early engagement with the vertical format by Harvard University's Nieman Journalism Lab, in textbooks, in patents for new technologies, in academic papers, by the ProVideo Coalition, and in media sources ranging from Norway's public broadcaster NRK to Wired Magazine, ZDnet, the Huffington Post, Editions Financial, the Chicago Tribune, Guachazh in Brazil to L'Obs in France.

The Festival accepts submissions of moving image works created on film, video, computer or mobile devices providing that the frame is taller than it is wide, and the video is of at least high definition resolution.

Its stated aims include giving amateur and professional filmmakers alike encouragement to explore the aesthetic possibilities of the oft-maligned vertical format in its formative years as commercialisation of the format proceeds apace. As such it screens a broad mix of live action fiction, animation, video art and documentary works. The Festival's website also offers a 'tips & tricks' guide to would-be vertical filmmakers dealing with various practical problems posed by having to work against apparatus and editing software often only designed for shooting horizontally.

== History ==
Conceived in early 2014 the Festival held its first edition in Katoomba, in Australia's Blue Mountains, on 17 October 2014. It was initially run under the auspices of the Australian Climbing Festival (ACF). Its co-founding directors are brother-sister team Adam Sebire and Natasha Sebire who initially conceived it as an interesting solution to an inherent problem faced by the ACF's film screening event: its principally vertical subject matter felt compositionally squashed by the standard 16:9 film frame, which had replaced the 'squarer' 4:3 frame in the early 2010s. No restrictions were placed on subject matter other than a maximum duration of 3 minutes, and indeed first prize went to an animation film. Entry to the Festival is free, with film submissions previewed for selection via Vimeo. The VFF is run as a not-for profit organisation; nobody is paid except the technicians, venues and the filmmakers who win prizes; the directors run it in their spare time.

The first Vertical Film Festival screened to a capacity audience at St. Hilda's Church, Katoomba in 2014 on a 4 metre high screen suspended above the transept, with the videos rear-projected in HD from behind the altar. The programme followed a formula the Festival has retained in future editions: showing finalist films from a worldwide competition call-out; intermission; a second half of curated tallscreen films from around the world; and finally the presentation of prizes. Finalists are shown online when the filmmakers so agree.

In 2016 the 2nd edition of the Festival moved quite literally across the road to another high-roofed venue, the independent Charrington Brewery, to be projected amidst the beer hops. On this occasion, prizes were chosen by popular audience vote.

In 2018 the Festival presented its 3rd edition on 8 December, also in Katoomba, Australia. The Festival announced that it would not run a 4th edition as scheduled for 2020 due to the logistical and economic challenges facing live screening presenters during the COVID-19 pandemic.
