= Radio Blue Mountains 89.1 =

Radio station in Katoomba, New South Wales

- Australia
- Broadcast area: The Upper and Mid Blue Mountains
- Frequency: 89.1 MHz FM

Programming
- Format: Community radio

Ownership
- Owner: The Blue Mountains Public Broadcasting Society Inc.

History
- First air date: 8 January 1993

Technical information
- Transmitter coordinates: 33°42′45″S 150°18′44.5″E

Links
- Webcast: Radio Blue Mountains Stream
- Website: rbm.org.au

Radio Blue Mountains 89.1 is a not-for-profit, all volunteer community radio station serving the Blue Mountains since 1993. The station broadcasts 24 hours a day from its studio in Katoomba, to a potential audience of some 75,000 people across the Blue Mountains and to a much wider national and international audience through internet streaming.

Radio Blue Mountains is a member of the CBAA Community Radio Network, a national network that provides a wide range of programming when local presenters are unavailable. The station is funded through listener support, grants and limited commercial sponsorship and is run on behalf of the members by a dedicated management committee.

== History ==
In 1985 the Blue Mountains Public Broadcasting Society Inc was inaugurated in Leura and on 25 August 1985 the Society was listed on the Australian Business Register. Initial test broadcasts were conducted over a period of a week that occurred four times a year until 1993. The transmission was set up in a very large abandoned home located in a gully in Leura, a small village east of Katoomba. Although the house was condemned and unfit for inhabitance, it was provided by the Blue Mountains City Council after it was claimed in lieu of rates. It was later demolished after having served its time as the first home for Radio Blue Mountains. The station gained much interest over the next several years as it conducted numerous tests up to 1992. At this point the station had started to relocate to Katoomba in 1992 where the third and second last major transmission took place.

In June 1992, the then-Australian Broadcasting Tribunal granted a full-time community broadcasting license to the Society. Two studios were built by the technical students from the Technical Education College in a former ambulance service station that held two ambulances at 7 Gang Gang St, Katoomba. Funding was provided by the Blue Mountains City Council.

The society was offered a peppercorn (very small) rent for rooms in the lower section of the Nepean Community College which in turn had a peppercorn rent with TAFE NSW. The station remained there broadcasting continually until 25 October 2016, when it then moved to new studios in Parke St and recommenced broadcasting a few days later on 28 October.

On 8 January 1993 the society began its first official public broadcast to the community.

In 1994 the station purchased a satellite dish to enable it to receive the CBAA Community Radio Network programme feed, allowing Radio Blue Mountains 89.1 to broadcast 24 hours a day. The Society celebrated its 21st anniversary in 2007.

In August 2008 the station obtained a licence to broadcast on the Internet and began implementing Internet streaming systems.

In early 2016 the station learned that the state owned government building that has housed the station since it commenced officially broadcasting in 1993 was to be sold. With the support from TAFE NSW, a new lease was negotiated with TAFE executives. The partial office move commenced in May 2016 and the studios followed late October that year.

== Programming ==
The station's diverse programming is designed to suit the needs of the Blue Mountains community, ranging from programs for people with disabilities, to others featuring local bands, interviews with people of interest to Blue Mountains residents and occasional live outside broadcasts are also a feature of its programming. The station's programs involve a wide range of music styles including jazz, country, rock, dance, blues and classical as well as coverage of local issues and events.

== Community Involvement ==
Radio Blue Mountains 89.1 works closely with the all sections of the Blue Mountains community. Its close relationship with the Blue Mountains City Council has led to efforts to establish the station as an emergency communicator in times of bushfires and other catastrophes. The station encourages local musicians and highlights social and cultural activity in the Upper Blue Mountains through on-air interviews along with its daily promotion of community events through its Community Notice Board segments.

== See also ==
- List of radio stations in Australia
