= Katoomba High School =

Coordinates: 33.7277°S 150.3138°E

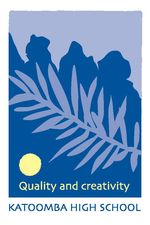

Location
- Martin St, Katoomba; Katoomba, Australia, New South Wales

Information
- School type: Government-operated comprehensive secondary school
- Motto: Quality and Creativity, formerly Truth Honour Duty
- Established: 1919
- Educational authority: NSW Department of Education
- Principal: Therese Devine
- Teaching staff: 57
- years: 7–12
- Enrollment: 802
- Houses: Megalong, Jamison, Burragorang, Kanimbla
- Website: katoomba-h.schools.nsw.gov.au

Katoomba High School is a Government-operated secondary school located in Katoomba, New South Wales, Australia. As of 2025 the principal is Tess Devine. The school has 802 students and 57 staff members.

Between 2019 and 2022 the school suffered from several sex scandals involving teachers.

On 15 August 2025 the school was visited by Chris Minns to open a new hall for the school, in line with a promise he made in 2022 to students at the school.

== History ==
=== Establishment and Public School (1881-1919) ===
The first public school in Katoomba was established in January 1882, and was borne from a application from local residents to the Department of Education. The school was located at the intersection of Valley Road, and what was the Great Western Highway, now Bathurst Road, and commenced operation with an enrollment of 50, and was housed in a tent. The school did not last long at this site, and after some dispute, moved to the site of the current Katoomba Public School. The first building was erected in 1883, on Parke Street, and was joined by multiple more between 1883 and 1891, when the first permanent building was opened by the then Minister for Education Sir J. H. Curruthers. In 1912, more buildings were constructed, to house the growing student body, and at the end of 1917, the Katoomba School Board informed the Department that they would like a District School to be formed in Katoomba. This was the start of secondary education in the Upper Blue Mountains, and of KHS itself.

=== Establishment of Secondary Education (1919-1939) ===
In 1919, the Katoomba District School was established. bringing secondary education to Katoomba, and ending the practice of secondary students from the area having to travel to Parramatta High. Local residents and citizens continued to lobby the NSW Government to have the school upgraded, to allow students to proceed to the Leaving Certificate, (equivalent of the modern HSC) and thus tertiary education. In 1920, the school was declared a Intermediate High School, and in 1923, the first Fifth Year students were presented with their Leaving Certificates. Throughout The Depression, many students at the school left without any employment prospects, with "At Home" being listed as employment for many graduates.

=== World War II, (1939-1945) ===
The entry of Japan into World War II, and the subsequent attack on Sydney by Japanese submarines, led to many families evacuating to the Blue Mountains, and thus bringing their students to KHS. This, alongside the opening of the Lithgow Small Arms Factory, led to a sharp increase in school enrollment, and nearly every available Council and Church hall was used as temporary classrooms. The Cookery School was also pressed into service by the National Emergency Services as a First Aid Post as part of the war effort, during which time electric lighting was installed by the NES. In 1943, the threat of Japanese invasion and the sharp enrollment increase lead to the Parents and Carers (P&C) funding the installation of the first telephone at KHS.

=== Martin Street (1945-1970s) ===
After the end of the war, the P&C once again lobbied to the Department, this time to have a separate High School built, and by 1947, the P&C members had pushed for a Council meeting to acquire a site. Out of four options, the Martin Street site was acquired in 1947. Over 10 years later, on the 25th of February 1959, the Foundation Stone was laid by the Hon. R. J. Heffron, Minister for Education, which can still be seen opposite the Studio today. After only a year's construction, the Martin Street building opened at the end of the first school term of 1960. The main building was constructed of reinforced concrete, with windows and walls made of glass, set in aluminum frames, in the brutalist style. Due to the design of the initial roof, the school leaked significantly, and in 1977-78, the school flooded, causing the Martin St. building to be closed, and students moved elsewhere.

=== Upgrades and additions (1970s-present) ===
During the 1970's, enrollments continued to rise, with a peak of 1300 students reached, the highest to date. Due to this increase, a further extension built, with four new science labs, a science milling area, science faculty staffroom, and new library, being constructed, all at the southernmost end of the school. Initially, this expansion was a separate building, but once again, after significant local pressure due to the necessity of having to face the regularly inclement weather when moving between the buildings, the current bi-level corridor was constructed between the southern end of the main building, and the 1970's addition. It was then that KHS began claiming its status as the "Longest continuous school building in the Southern Hemisphere", although this is not corroborated by any other sources or institutions.
