= DramaBox =

Chinese short-form video streaming platform

- Industry: Vertical drama
- Founded: April 2023
- Headquarters: Singapore
- Owner: StoryMatrix
- Website: www.dramaboxdb.com

StoryMatrix Pte. Ltd.
- Short name: StoryMatrix
- Founded: January 2022
- Brand(s): DramaBox
- Parent: Dianzhong Technology Co., Ltd

DramaBox is a Chinese–Singaporean duanju app launched in April 2023, developed by Beijing-based Dianzhong Technology and owned by its Singapore-based subsidiary, StoryMatrix. Specializing in the Duanju sector, its revenue primarily comes from in-app purchases, and subscriptions. The platform's short dramas are filmed vertically. As of May 2025, the total users of the app and four other microdrama apps reached more than 150 million. By August, it had achieved 90 million users. Currently, it is part of Disney's accelerator program.

DramaBox is Singaporean-backed and focuses on producing short dramas, as exemplified by Divorced at the Wedding Day. In addition to translating Chinese series, it also introduces original content. It is also available in other markets, such as Brazil, and the USA. As of Q1 2024, it was ranked as the world's third-largest short drama app by downloads. During H1 2025, it averaged 44 million MAUs. As of October, it was one of the most downloaded U.S. microdrama apps.

== History ==
Between 2020 and 2022, following the early boom of China's duanju industry, several media companies launched dedicated apps to introduce duanjus to the international market. DramaBox was introduced in April 2023. DramaBox initially purchased the rights to Chinese short dramas and translated them for international distribution, and later also produced a large number of original short dramas. In 2024, it partnered with U.S. production company Purple Filter. As of March, the total viewing time for its microdramas exceeded 99,000 minutes. In the same year, its revenue amounted to $323 million.

As of March 2025, DramaBox app achieved 50 million downloads on Google Play. By August, this figure had eclipsed 100 million.

=== Disney Accelerator ===
In July 2025, DramaBox was selected for the Disney Accelerator, The Walt Disney Company's program for emerging media and technology companies. The selection was widely viewed as a sign of growing interest from major entertainment companies in the vertical drama sector. Subsequent reports indicated that Disney and DramaBox were exploring opportunities to adapt existing intellectual properties into microdrama formats, reflecting broader industry interest in applying the format across a wider range of genres and audiences.

== See also ==
- Hongguo Duanju
- ReelShort
