= Winter Magic Festival =

Fedrival held in Katoomba, Australia

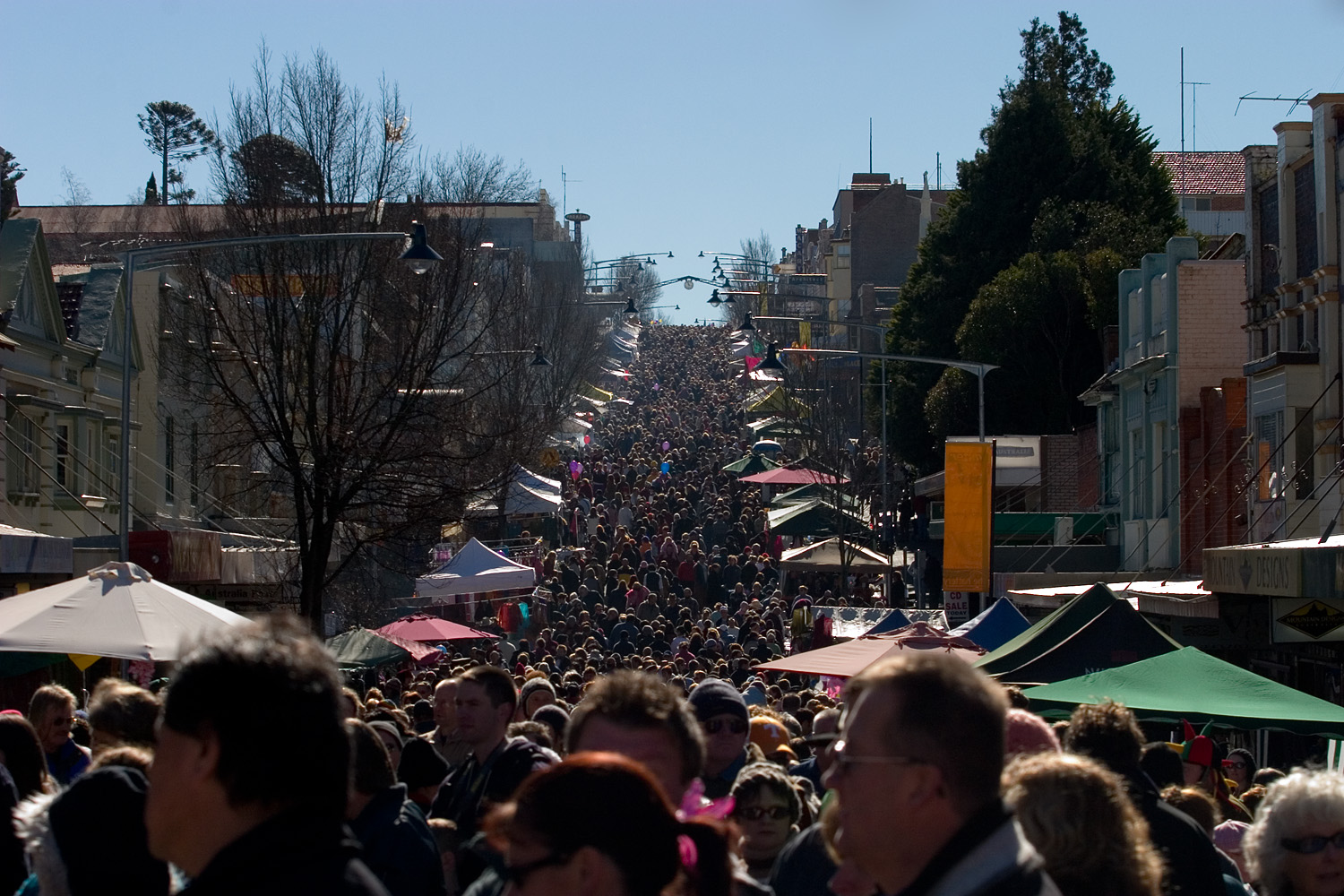
Busy Katoomba Street during the Winter Magic Festival 2005

The Winter Magic Festival is a community festival celebrated around the Winter solstice in Katoomba in the Blue Mountains of New South Wales, Australia since 1994.

The Winter Magic Festival has the highest profile and is the most anticipated of Blue Mountains' annual events. The festival has been going for 32 years and has always been organised by volunteers, under community ownership. The Blue Mountains is New South Wales' first City of the Arts and Katoomba is the heart of that city. On Winter Magic weekend artists, musicians, dancers, drummers, choirs and community take over one of Australia's most famous towns. During the event, the main street of Katoomba is closed to motor traffic and open to pedestrian traffic. This allows the main street to become a performance space. The streets are lined with market stalls, available spaces are converted to music and performance stages, and everybody who attends is encouraged to dress in costume.

Katoomba Winter Magic has a strong local focus and very wide general appeal.

== History ==
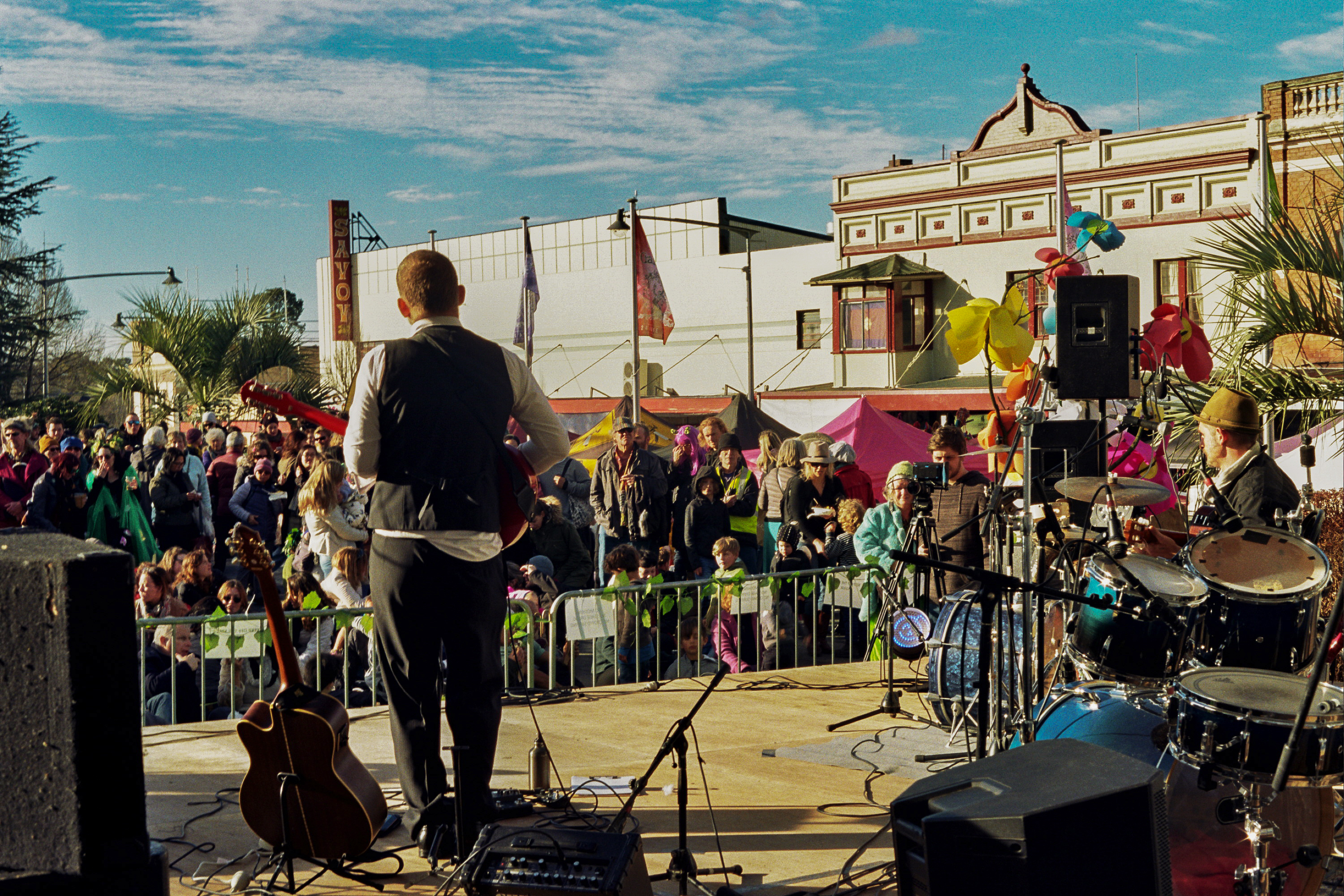
Live music performance near Katoomba Street, 2017

John Ellison, then cultural development coordinator with Blue Mountains City Council, following an invitation from the local Chamber of Commerce to revitalize Christmas in July, created and opened the Winter Magic Festival in 1994. The inaugural event attracted 2,000 visitors.

There was some hesitation among some of the local churches in the first year of the festival but by the second year they had joined in the celebrations. Snow fell in the first year of the festival (See Facebook for Reference), adding to the Magical feeling of the day with locals and tourists quickly making it a treasured annual tradition and local school students getting in on making costumes and participating in the parade.

In 2014 the festival attracted approximately 30,000 visitors. By 2016, the festival was attracting up to 50,000 visitors.

The 2019 festival didn't have a parade but instead focused on community arts and performance.

In 2018 the festival went into hiatus after organisers concluded the festival could not continue in its current form. The Winter Magic Festival Association relaunched Winter Magic on 22 June 2019.

In 2020 & 2021 the festivals had been cancelled as:

"Meeting the Covid19 requirements in an open street environment with multiple entry points is too big a challenge for our small volunteer Committee."

The 2026 festival is being promoted, with sponsorship by AirBnB being cited as an enabling factor, reflected by the newly named "AirBnN Grand Parade". Accessed 18th May 2026
