= COL Group =

Digital publishing company

COL Group Co Ltd (Chinese: 中文在线) is a digital content company. Founded in 2000, the company develops and applies IP across formats and applies AI technology into its operations. It operates its business in several countries and regions.

COL Group's core business includes content development, IP operations, international business expansion, and the use of Artificial Intelligence (AI) to support its content.

== History ==
COL was founded at Tsinghua University, Beijing, in 2000. It was listed on Shenzhen Stock Exchange on 21 January 2015.

COL Group sources licensed digital content from its proprietary platforms, contracted authors, and copyright organizations. It operates multiple original content platforms, including 17K.com and 4YT.NET, as well as genre-focused labels for science fiction and mystery fiction.

According to company disclosures, the group reported holding a catalog of more than 5.6 million digital works, with participation from over 4.5 million online authors and partnerships with hundreds of copyright organizations.

In 2022, COL Group reported revenue from paid short-form video content, including mini-series.

The company operates online literature platforms in China and is involved in short-form drama production, IP-based merchandise, and related fields. It has established offices in the U.S., Japan, and Southeast Asia, and holds a stake in Crazy Maple Studio, the parent company of the short drama platform 'ReelShort'.

== ReelShort ==
Crazy Maple Studio, a partially owned subsidiary of COL Group, published the video app ReelShort in August 2022. It provides duanjus that are only several minutes long. Crazy Maple Studio adapted some shows from scripts that were originally written in Chinese and produced for users in China. After downloads of ReelShort from the US Apple App Store surged in November 2023, COL's stock price more than doubled in two weeks.

== Sereal+ ==
Sereal+ is a duanju platform under COL Web, which was launched in December 2023. It produces and distributes short drama globally. Users have access to various genres of duanjus via Sereal+'s App or its website. Series include Once Upon a Divorce: The Double Life of Lady Diana, Wake Up Dad! Wedding Time, and My Cold-Blooded Alpha King.

== UniReel ==
In November 2024, COL JAPAN launched the duanju app UniReel. Its first series was a school-based mystery drama——The Final Lesson – Only Survivors Graduate. UniReel's first production was a short drama originally produced by Nippon TV, starring Yusei Yagi. The Final Lesson – Only Survivors Graduate won Best Actor at the 1st Asia Short-Form Drama Awards in 2025, with Yusei Yagi recognized for his performance in the UniReel-released series.

== FlareFlow ==
FlareFlow distributes serialized short dramas optimized for mobile viewing. The service was introduced as part of COL Group’s expansion into overseas digital entertainment markets.FlareFlow maintains offices in Singapore, Los Angeles, and Beijing.Its catalog includes both licensed and original productions released in episodic format.

The platform became available on the App Store and Google Play in April 2025. In September 2025, it briefly ranked among the top free entertainment apps in the United States. By late 2025, FlareFlow was accessible in over 170 countries with multilingual user interfaces.

FlareFlow features short-form series across genres such as romance, fantasy, urban drama, and suspense. FlareFlow commissions both independent studios and in-house teams to produce content for international distribution. Industry reports note that FlareFlow has achieved download growth and category rankings in markets such as the United States, Germany, Australia, and Canada.

In 2025, COL Group disclosed the establishment of a microdrama production facility in the Guangdong–Hong Kong–Macao Greater Bay Area. According to industry reporting, the facility includes multiple standing sets designed for short-form drama production and is intended to support the filming of serialized microdrama content."COL Group Unveils First Look at Dedicated Microdrama Studio in Macao". Variety. December 9, 2025.

== Tanmi Space ==
Tanmi Space is an IP derivatives brand under COL Group engaged in the development of trendy toys. It produces original toy lines and merchandise based on proprietary and collaborative intellectual properties.

== Investment in AI ==
AI LLM

COL Group has invested in AI LLM (Large Language Model) and multimodal generative AI, both technically and commercially. In 2023, COL Group launched "Xiaoyao.ai," a 10,000-word creative LLM, capable of generating a 10,000-word novel with one click, writing a novel from a single image, and comprehending a million-word novel in one read. auther.xiaoyao.ai enables users to create and publish AI-assisted original works.

AI Anime Shorts

COL Group engages in the production of AI anime shorts as part of its digital content business. These short animated series are created using artificial intelligence technologies in areas such as scriptwriting, visual design, and animation generation. The company integrates AI tools into the content production workflow to support the development of serialized short-form animations, primarily targeting mobile and online platforms. This initiative forms a segment of COL Group's broader involvement in AI-assisted content creation.
