= Hongguo (software) =

Chinese microdrama streaming platforms

Hongguo Duanju 红果短剧
- Developers: Beijing Bimo Liuxiang Technology Co., Ltd.
- Release: August 2023; 3 years ago
- Operating system: Android, iOS
- Available in: Chinese
- Type: Streaming media, duanju
- License: Proprietary

Hongguo Manju 红果漫剧
- Developers: Hainan Yuyue Technology Co., Ltd.
- Release: November 2025; 1 year ago
- Operating system: Android, iOS
- Available in: Chinese
- Type: Streaming media, webcomic, AI-generated drama
- License: Proprietary

Hongguo, primarily known through its main application Hongguo Duanju (Chinese: 红果短剧; pinyin: Hóngguǒ Duǎnjù; lit. ‘red fruit short drama’), is a Chinese advertising-supported streaming platform focused on microdrama (duanju). It is part of the ByteDance group and is operated by Beijing Bimo Liuxiang Technology Co., Ltd. (北京笔墨留香科技有限公司), a company wholly owned by Douyin.

The service was introduced in 2023 and its standalone application was launched in August of that year. Hongguo initially concentrated on short, predominantly vertical-format live-action dramas, generally consisting of episodes lasting only a few minutes. It subsequently broadened its catalogue to include films, television programmes, novels, audiobooks and comics. From 2025, Hongguo expanded substantially into animated and AI-generated dramas. A separate application, Hongguo Manju (红果漫剧), was launched in late 2025 for animated and other non-live-action short-form serials.

== History ==
Hongguo Duanju was introduced by Douyin in May 2023, with its individual mobile application formally launched in August 2023. Its operating company, Beijing Bimo Liuxiang Technology, is wholly owned by Beijing Douyin Information Service. Chinese media have described Hongguo as a ByteDance product and have linked its early development to Fanqie Novel, ByteDance's advertising-supported online literature service. Before Hongguo's launch, personnel from the Fanqie Novel business were reassigned to work on short dramas, while the new service received traffic and commercial support from other parts of ByteDance.

Hongguo adopted a free-to-watch model at a time when much of China's commercial microdrama market relied on users paying to unlock episodes or on advertising campaigns directing viewers to paid mini-programmes. The service instead used algorithmic recommendation and advertising as its principal distribution and monetisation mechanisms. Hongguo also drew on online-literature intellectual property from Fanqie Novel while acquiring programmes from independent production companies.

The platform's audience increased rapidly during 2024. According to QuestMobile figures cited by The Economic Observer, Hongguo had about 120 million monthly active users in September 2024, compared with substantially smaller audiences for other dedicated short-drama applications at the time. The same report said that Hongguo was adding more than 1,000 short dramas per month by November 2024 and had accumulated more than 15,000 titles.

Caixin attributed Hongguo’s growth to its free-to-watch model, cash incentives, and acquisitions of exclusive content.

In 2024, Chinese regulators issued a series of directives concerning duanju, including guidance addressing sensational titles, stereotyped portrayals of wealthy corporate protagonists and other content considered vulgar or socially inappropriate.

On 25 December 2024, Chinese National Radio and Television Administration's Online Audiovisual Programme Management Department and the Beijing Municipal Radio and Television Bureau summoned Hongguo executives for a regulatory meeting. Authorities said that Hongguo had not adequately implemented existing management requirements and that programmes which clearly violated recent regulatory guidance had continued to appear on the service. Hongguo subsequently announced that it would review the dramas available on the platform, remove material found to violate the rules and reassess programmes awaiting publication under revised standards. It suspended the release of new dramas for five days while carrying out the review.

Hongguo continued to expand during 2025 and 2026 as short-form drama applications became a major segment of China's online-video market. QuestMobile data reported in July 2026 put the May 2026 monthly active user figure for Hongguo Free Short Drama at approximately 356 million, while Hongguo Free Manju had approximately 39 million monthly active users.

== Service and business ==
Hongguo's principal content consists of serialized microdramas, particularly vertical-format productions in which individual episodes commonly last between one and several minutes. The service distributes romance, family, historical, fantasy, workplace and other genres associated with China's online-fiction and microdrama industries. It also provides some conventional films and television series, as well as novels and audiobooks.

Most short dramas on Hongguo can be viewed without purchasing individual episodes or a conventional video subscription. Revenue is generated primarily from advertisements inserted during viewing, with a portion of advertising income distributed to participating rights holders or producers under platform revenue-sharing arrangements. The application has also used a reward system in which users receive virtual points or "diamonds" for activities such as watching programmes, which can under certain conditions be exchanged for cash.

Hongguo combines licensed works from outside producers with productions based on intellectual property from Fanqie Novel and other sources. By late 2024, The Economic Observer reported that the platform was working with more than 400 copyright partners. Hongguo has used a mixture of revenue sharing, production funding and intellectual-property licensing rather than requiring all programmes distributed through the service to be exclusive.

== AI-generated dramas ==
During 2025, Hongguo increasingly distributed AI generated dramas. Such programmes typically retain the rapid pacing and short episode lengths of live-action microdramas. The growth of generative-AI video tools allowed producers to automate or accelerate parts of the production process, contributing to the expansion of the format.

AI is used in the production of many contemporary manju for tasks including preliminary script generation, storyboarding, character and background creation, animation, voice generation and translation. Industry reporting in 2025 described AI-assisted production pipelines capable of reducing the time and labour required to create serialized animated dramas. On Hongguo, AI-generated programmes developed into both conventional 2D or 3D animated forms and more photorealistic forms designed to resemble live-action productions.

In November 2025, ByteDance launched a dedicated application for the format, Hongguo Manju. The application was developed by Hainan Yuyue Technology Co., Ltd. (海南愉阅科技有限公司), a subsidiary of Beijing Bimo Liuxiang Technology, and evolved from an earlier application called Xianling Free Short Drama (咸柠免费短剧). It was described by Chinese technology and media publications as ByteDance's first standalone application dedicated to manju. QuestMobile figures cited in early 2026 indicated that the application reached several million monthly active users shortly after its launch, before increasing to approximately 39 million monthly active users by May 2026.

The term AI manju (AI漫剧) encompasses several distinct visual forms. Some programmes use stylised two-dimensional or three-dimensional animation, while another category, generally called AI photorealistic drama or AI simulated-live-action drama (AI仿真人剧), uses generated human characters and environments intended to approximate the appearance of filmed actors.

AI-generated works also began appearing alongside live-action productions in Hongguo's general popularity rankings. In July 2026, 36Kr reported that seven of the ten highest-ranked programmes on Hongguo during one week were AI-generated manju, including animated and photorealistic productions.

The growth of AI production led to speculation in early 2026 that Hongguo would reduce investment in conventional productions. Hongguo editor-in-chief Le Li and Douyin Group vice-president Li Liang publicly rejected claims that the platform was abandoning live-action short dramas, saying that changes to production-guarantee arrangements did not constitute a withdrawal from live-action content. The company instead characterised live-action and AI-generated dramas as serving different types of stories and audiences.

== See also ==
- Douyin
- ByteDance
- Duanju
