= Katoomba =

Chief town of the City of Blue Mountains in New South Wales, Australia

- Town
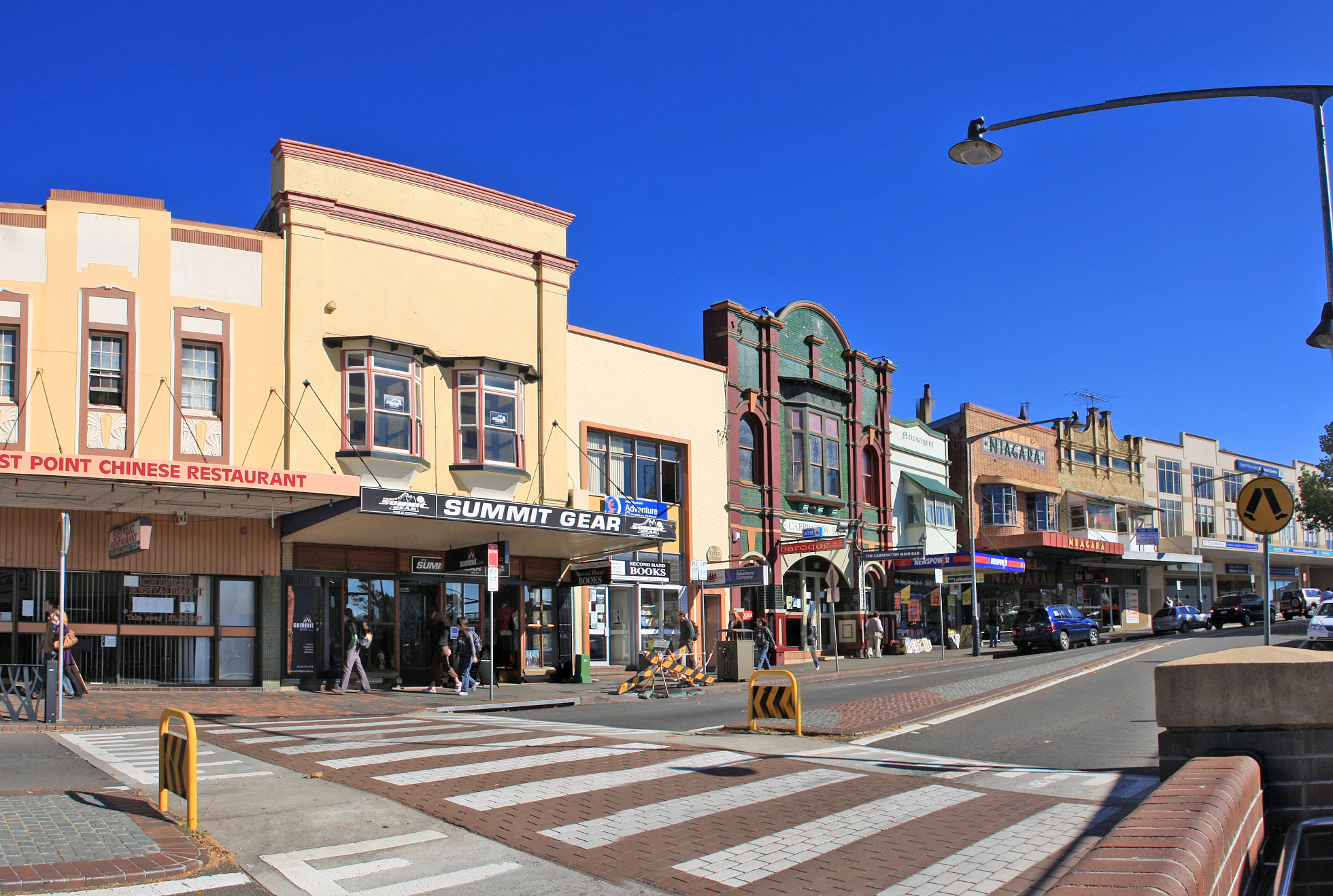
- Bathurst Road, Katoomba commercial area

- Interactive map of Katoomba
- Coordinates: 33.71°S 150.31°E
- Country: Australia
- State: New South Wales
- LGA: City of Blue Mountains
- Location: 102 km (63 mi) W of Sydney CBD; 39 km (24 mi) SE of Lithgow
- Established: 1879

Government
  - State electorate: Blue Mountains
  - Federal division: Macquarie
- Elevation: 1,017 m (3,337 ft)

Population
  - Total: 8,268 (2021 census)
- Postcode: 2780
- County: Cook
- Mean max temp: 17.6 °C (63.7 °F)
- Mean min temp: 8.3 °C (46.9 °F)
- Annual rainfall: 1,309.2 mm (51.54 in)
Localities around Katoomba
| Medlow Bath | Medlow Bath | Blue Mountains National Park |
| Megalong Valley | Katoomba | Leura |
| Narrow Neck Plateau | Jamison Valley | Jamison Valley |

Katoomba is the main town and council seat of the City of Blue Mountains in New South Wales, Australia, and is the administrative centre of Blue Mountains City Council.

Situated on the Great Western Highway and the Great Western Railway, Katoomba is home to the Three Sisters, 102 km (63 mi) by road west of Sydney Central Business District and 39 km (24 mi) south-east of Lithgow. Katoomba railway station serves the town. Katoomba is located on the lands of the Dharug and Gundungurra Aboriginal peoples.

Katoomba is a base for bush and nature walks in the surrounding Blue Mountains. At the 2021 census, Katoomba had a population of 8,268 people.

== Etymology ==
Kedumba or Katta-toon-bah is an Aboriginal term for "shining falling water" or "water tumbling over hill" and takes its name from a waterfall that drops into the Jamison Valley below the Harrys Amphitheatre escarpment. Previously, the site was known as William's Chimney and Collett's Swamp. In 1874 the locality was named The Crushers after the name of the railway station that served a nearby quarry. The name Katoomba was adopted in 1877 and the town achieved municipality status in 1889.

== History ==
For thousands of years, the Blue Mountains were home to Aboriginal peoples, specifically, the Gundungurra and Darug tribes. They knew the area as kedumba, meaning shiny, falling waters. Many of them were forced to move from their ancestral lands to Aboriginal settlements such as "The Gully", a tract of land in south Katoomba, as part of discriminatory policies established at the beginning of the 20th century. It was used as a summer encampment by the Darug and Gundungurra peoples long before the arrival of white settlers. Settlements on the Blue Mountains before 1950 led to the relocation of many Aboriginal families to "The Gully".

Between 1955 and 1957, dozens of the inhabitants of "The Gully" were forcibly evicted in order to clear the land for a racetrack being developed by a group of local businessmen. By 1958, at least 27 children from the area had also been taken from their families.

Today, there are still many traditional Aboriginal peoples living in the Blue Mountains, where there are now a number of cultural sites that walk visitors through the region's rich past and share the customs and heritage of the local tribes.

Katoomba and nearby Medlow Bath were first developed as tourist destinations towards the end of the 19th century when a series of hotels were built and then repeatedly extended.

Katoomba Coffee Palace was a coffee palace created around 1900 by "Mr Tamm" in a building previously known as The Priory, which was the boarding house of a school before being converted into a guesthouse. Tamm renamed it Royal Coffee Palace. Council headquarters were built on the site in 1961. It included a large dining room seating up to 75 people, as well as 35 bedrooms. An undated photograph shows intricate Victorian filigree architecture, while a photo dated 1906 shows a very different facade, with the balcony removed.

Coal and oil shale mining was also carried out in the Jamison Valley for many years, but when the seams were completely exhausted by the early 20th century, Katoomba was an established resort town. By the 1960s, Katoomba had somewhat declined, and several of its guest houses were converted for other purposes, including convalescent hospitals.

In the 1980s, the guest houses and hotels again became fashionable and many were restored.

In 2012, under the National Parks and Wildlife Act 1974, the Hon. Bob Debus, local Member of Parliament, officially declared "The Gully" an “Aboriginal place”, a place of special significance to Aboriginal culture.

== Climate ==
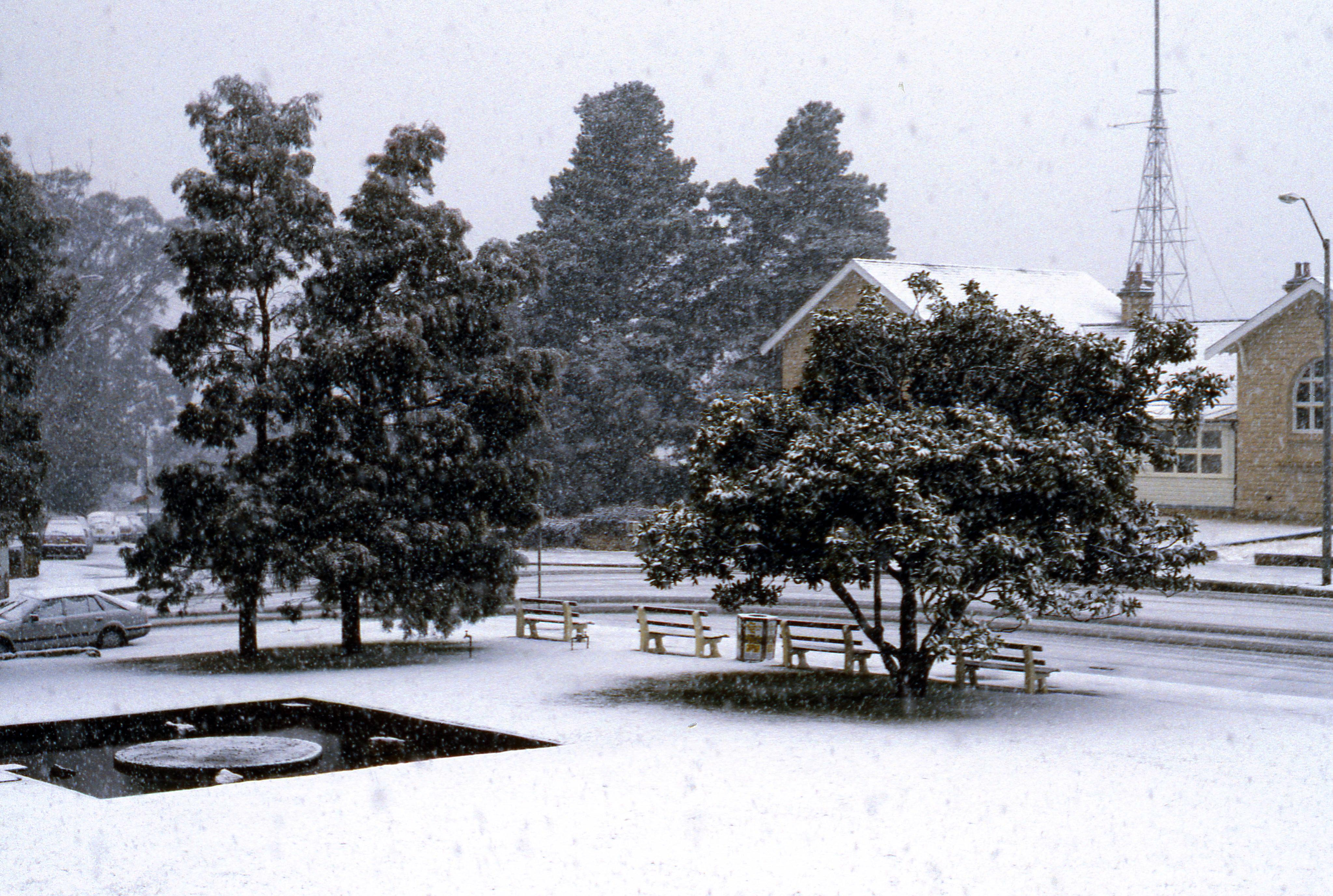
The Council Chambers during a snowfall

Katoomba has an oceanic climate (Cfb) with mild summers and cool to cold winters. At Katoomba (1040 metres above sea level) summer daytime temperatures are usually in the low 20s – with a few rare days extending into the 30s (Celsius) – and night-time temperatures usually in the low teens.

In winter, the maximum temperature is typically about 10 °C (50 °F) while the minimum generally around 0 °C (32 °F) or so on clear nights and 3 to 4 °C (37 to 39 °F) on cloudy nights. There are usually two or three settled snowfalls per year. Temperatures are on average 7 °C (13 °F) lower than Sydney with many misty days. Katoomba has 79.8 days of clear skies, annually.

=== Snowfall ===
The Blue Mountains has a reputation for snow in winter. However, despite the cool temperatures, there are only around five snowy days per year in the upper mountains area. It is extremely rare to see snow below Lawson. It is not unusual to see white blankets of frost covering the ground in the early morning hours. In the evening, thick coverings of ice can form on car windscreens.

Moreover, winters are not as snowy and rainy as those of Orange and Oberon, to the west; this is due to the fact Katoomba mostly lies on the leeward (eastern) side of the ranges, thereby experiencing a moderate foehn effect.

Several significant snowfalls have been recorded. On 5 July 1900, snowdrifts were over 1.8 metres (6 ft) deep in parts of the Blue Mountains. The snow and ice caused significant problems throughout central New South Wales, with rail and road closures, damage to buildings, and disruption to telegraph services. A winter storm on 17 July 1965 also produced very heavy snow and ice in the area, with damage to buildings and major difficulties with road and rail transport. A cold snap brought heavy snow, up to 20 cm (7.9 in), to Katoomba and other towns in the upper Blue Mountains on 17 July 2015 which was the heaviest snowfall in many years. On 10 June 2021, a significant snowfall occurred in the area during a widespread cold outbreak across south-eastern Australia.

Climate data for Katoomba (Farnells Road, 1991–2020, extremes 1957–2026); 1,017 m AMSL; 33.71° S, 150.30° E
| Month | Jan | Feb | Mar | Apr | May | Jun | Jul | Aug | Sep | Oct | Nov | Dec | Year |
|---|---|---|---|---|---|---|---|---|---|---|---|---|---|
| Record high °C (°F) | 39.8 (103.6) | 38.8 (101.8) | 34.8 (94.6) | 29.6 (85.3) | 22.9 (73.2) | 19.4 (66.9) | 18.8 (65.8) | 22.0 (71.6) | 28.6 (83.5) | 31.2 (88.2) | 36.0 (96.8) | 39.5 (103.1) | 39.8 (103.6) |
| Mean daily maximum °C (°F) | 24.2 (75.6) | 22.9 (73.2) | 20.7 (69.3) | 17.8 (64.0) | 14.1 (57.4) | 10.9 (51.6) | 10.6 (51.1) | 12.2 (54.0) | 15.6 (60.1) | 18.5 (65.3) | 20.6 (69.1) | 22.6 (72.7) | 17.6 (63.7) |
| Daily mean °C (°F) | 18.9 (66.0) | 18.2 (64.8) | 16.2 (61.2) | 13.4 (56.1) | 10.2 (50.4) | 7.5 (45.5) | 6.8 (44.2) | 7.8 (46.0) | 10.7 (51.3) | 13.3 (55.9) | 15.4 (59.7) | 17.3 (63.1) | 13.0 (55.4) |
| Mean daily minimum °C (°F) | 13.5 (56.3) | 13.4 (56.1) | 11.7 (53.1) | 9.0 (48.2) | 6.3 (43.3) | 4.1 (39.4) | 2.9 (37.2) | 3.4 (38.1) | 5.8 (42.4) | 8.0 (46.4) | 10.1 (50.2) | 11.9 (53.4) | 8.3 (46.9) |
| Record low °C (°F) | 4.2 (39.6) | 3.9 (39.0) | 1.7 (35.1) | −0.5 (31.1) | −2.8 (27.0) | −3.4 (25.9) | −5.4 (22.3) | −5.6 (21.9) | −2.8 (27.0) | −1.0 (30.2) | −0.1 (31.8) | 2.4 (36.3) | −5.6 (21.9) |
| Average precipitation mm (inches) | 147.6 (5.81) | 209.9 (8.26) | 168.2 (6.62) | 87.2 (3.43) | 79.8 (3.14) | 104.9 (4.13) | 55.0 (2.17) | 66.2 (2.61) | 63.6 (2.50) | 90.2 (3.55) | 131.9 (5.19) | 111.9 (4.41) | 1,309.2 (51.54) |
| Average precipitation days (≥ 0.2 mm) | 16.3 | 15.7 | 15.6 | 11.5 | 10.1 | 12.2 | 10.6 | 9.8 | 10.1 | 12.1 | 15.6 | 14.7 | 154.3 |
| Average afternoon relative humidity (%) | 61 | 66 | 65 | 63 | 69 | 71 | 67 | 57 | 54 | 53 | 59 | 57 | 62 |
Source 1: Temperatures and rain data: 1991–2020; Relative humidity: 1991–2020
Source 2: Extremes: 1957–present

== People and culture ==
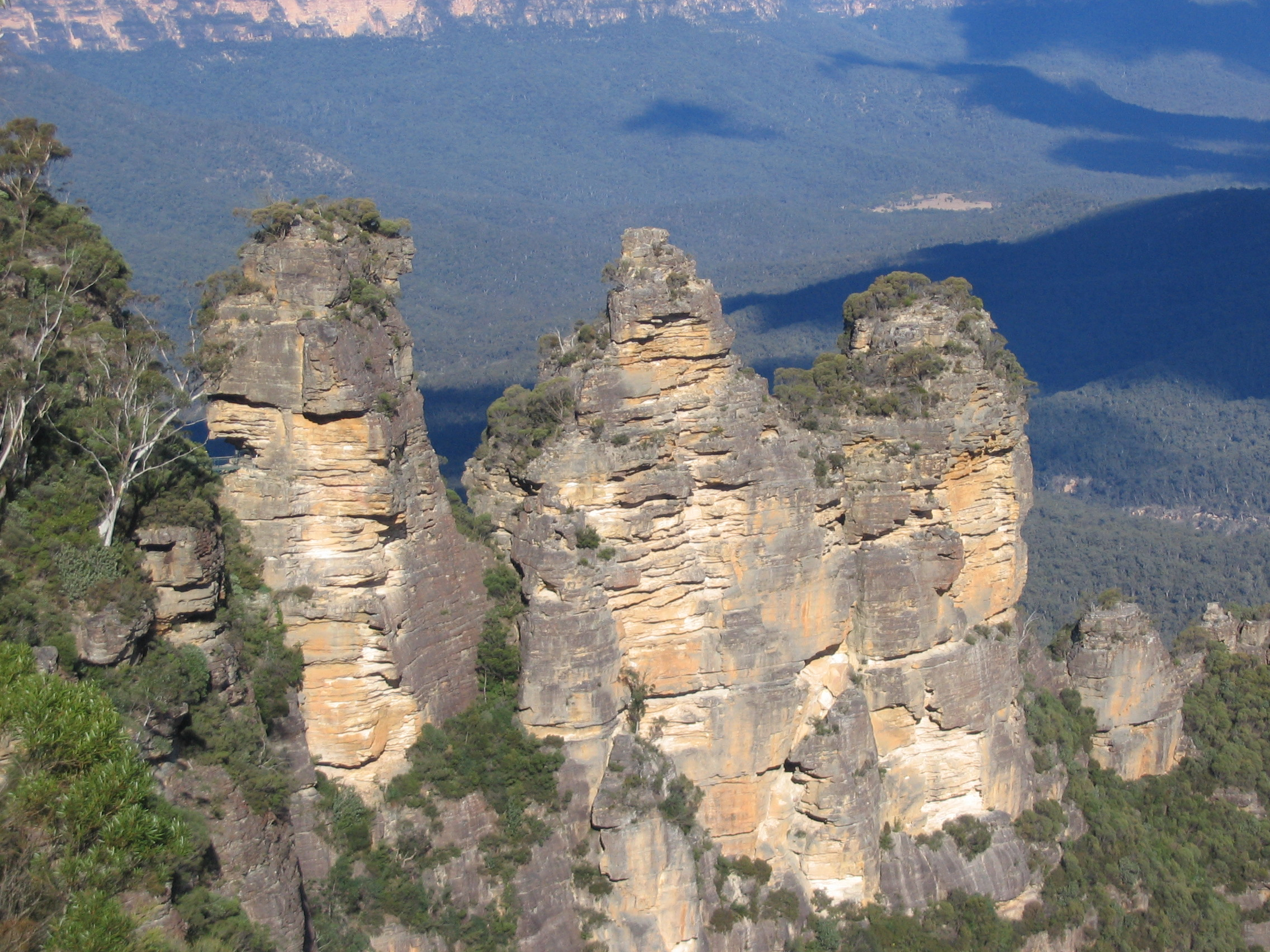
The Three Sisters, a well-known rock formation on the south edge of Katoomba

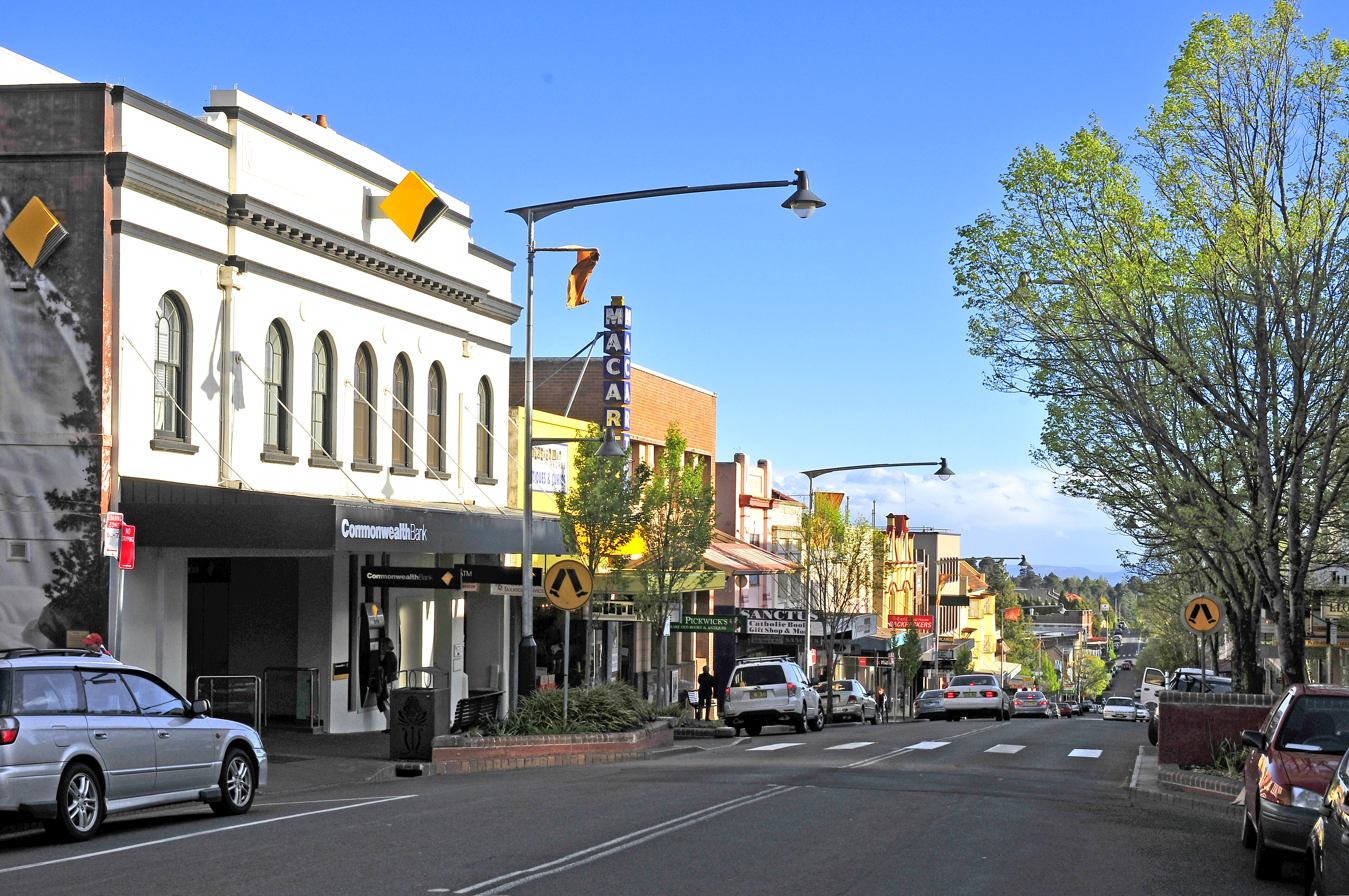
Shops in Katoomba

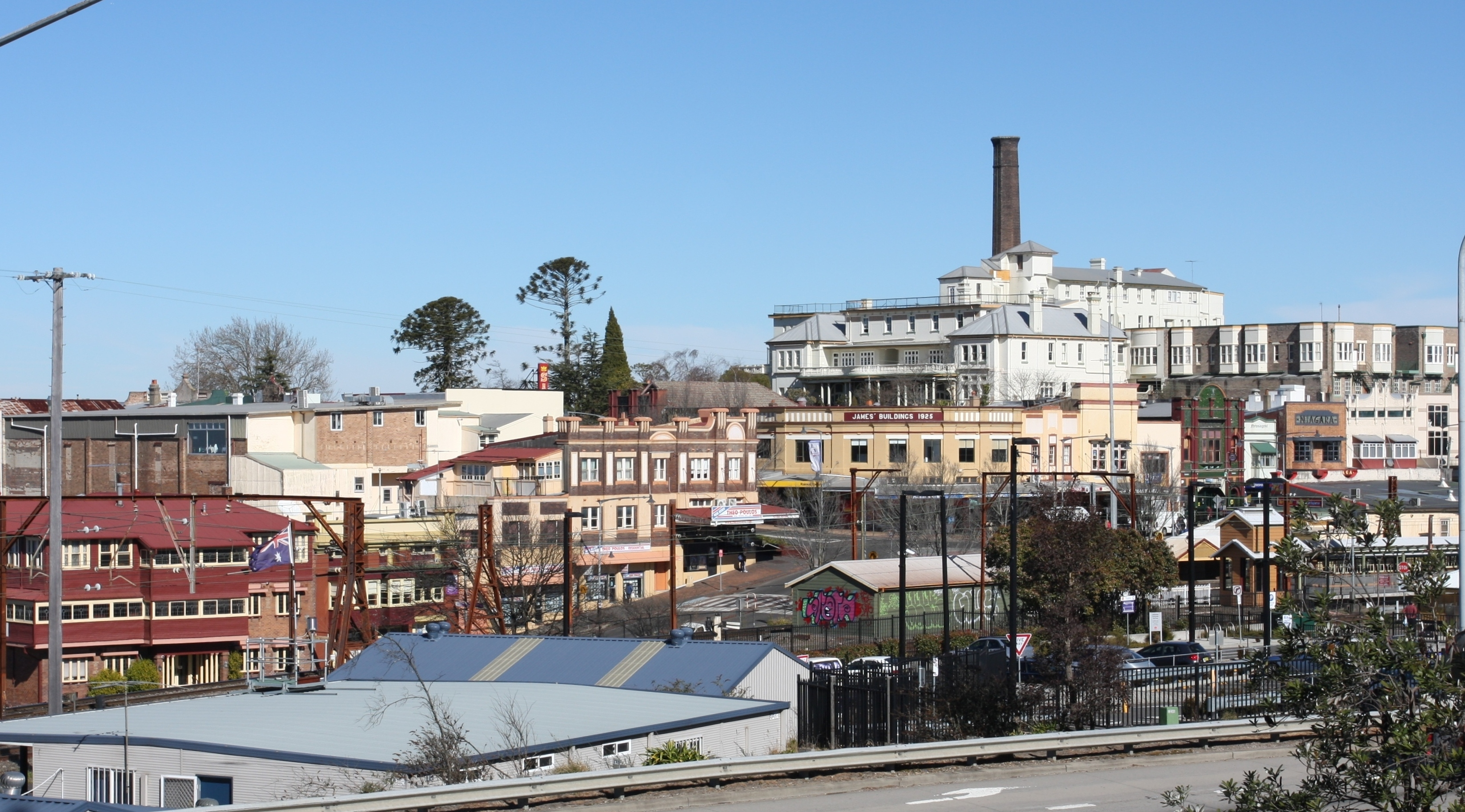
Katoomba from Civic Place

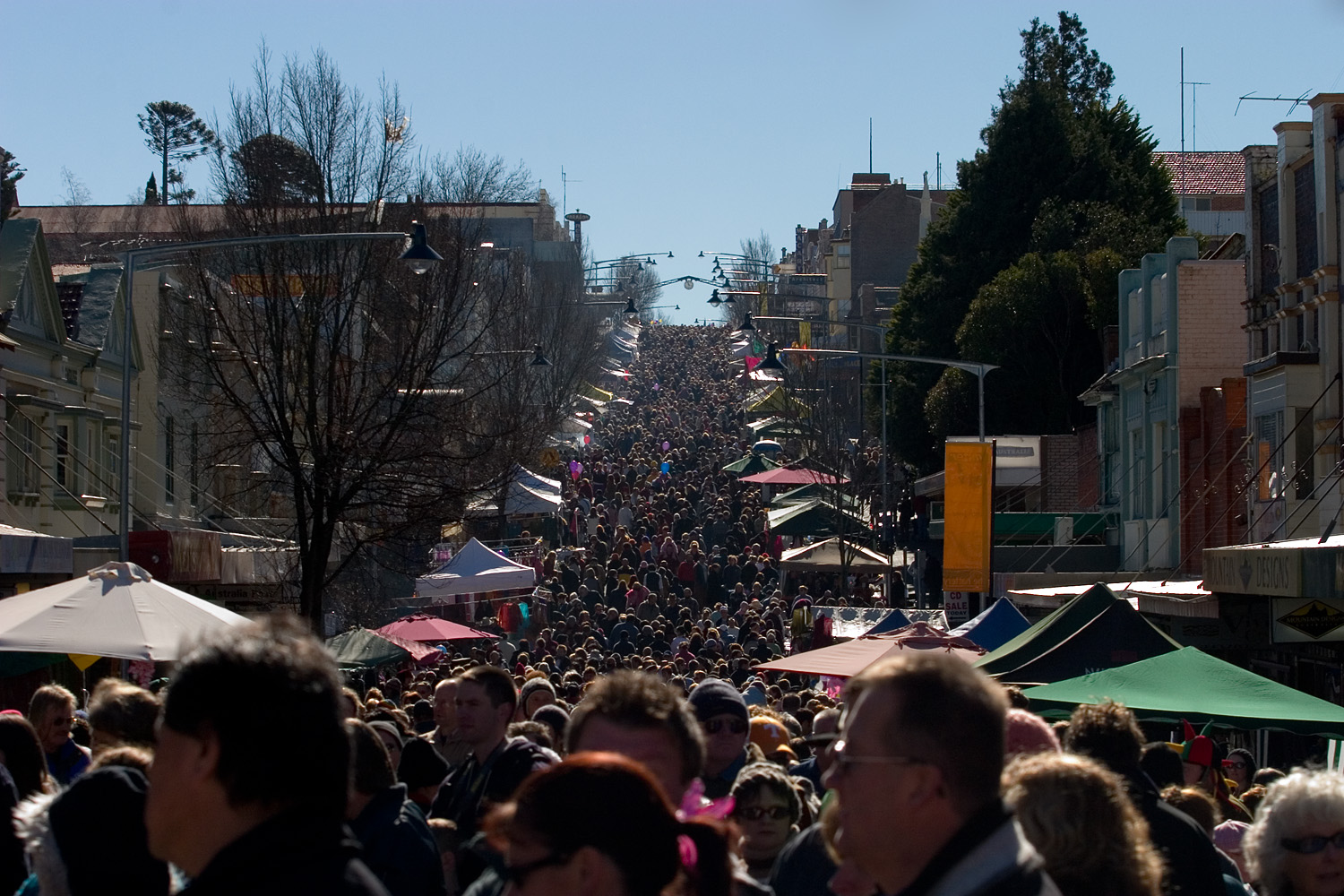
Katoomba during a winter festival

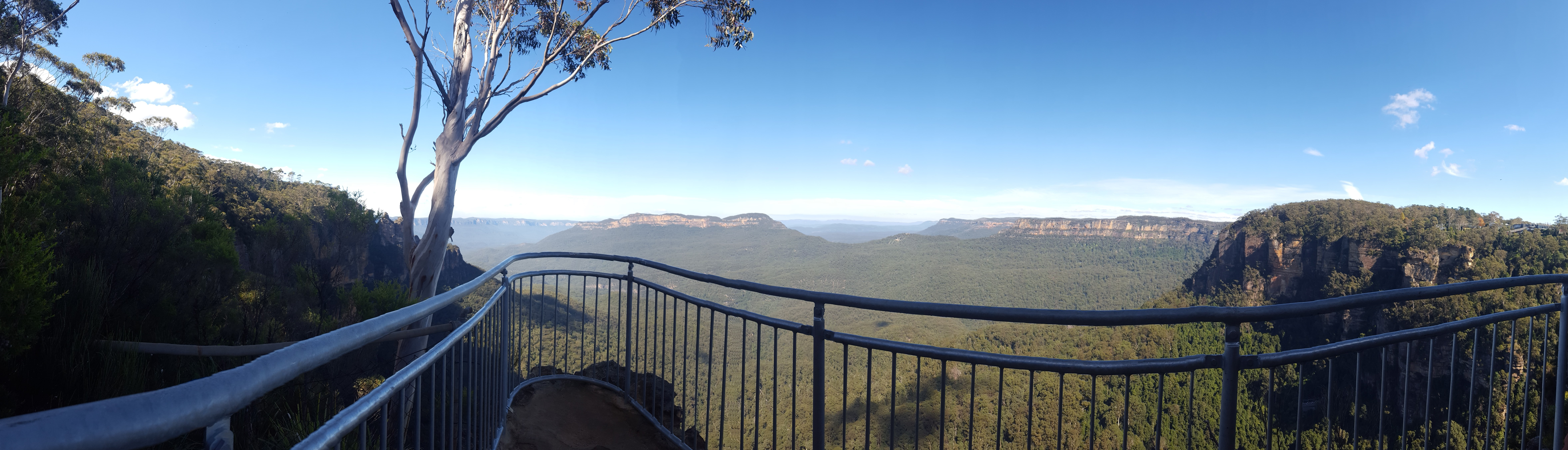
A panoramic view of Wollumai Lookout, at Katoomba.

The area's scenery and art deco-style shops and houses attract an alternative subculture. Many poets, artists and environmentalists reside in Katoomba and the Blue Mountains generally, and the town hosts the Winter Solstice festival, Winter Magic, that features local talent, art and handicraft. The festival was established in 1994 to provide a local focus for the Blue Mountains-wide Yulefest. Yulefest is a long-running tourism initiative that promotes Northern Hemisphere-style Christmas celebrations during the Australian winter months June to August.

Novelist and historian Eleanor Dark (1901–1985) lived in Katoomba with her husband Eric Dark from 1923 until her death. The couple's home "Varuna" is now Varuna, The Writers' House. In 1921, production house duo Raymond Longford and Lottie Lyell filmed The Blue Mountains Mystery in part around the town centre. Ursula Dubosarsky's 1991 time-travel novel Zizzy Zing is set in Katoomba in 1938, at the time of the Sesquicentenary. Poet and author, Steven Herrick wrote a novel, 'The Bogan Mondrian' located in modern-day Katoomba. His verse-novel, 'love, ghosts and nose-hair' is also set in the town.

Blues musician Claude Hay is also a resident of Katoomba, having built his home and recording studio on the outskirts of town. Both of Hay's albums, 2007's Kiss the Sky and 2010s Deep Fried Satisfied were recorded in Katoomba, with the latter earning Hay critical acclaim and a No. 1 on the Roots Music Report Australian chart and No. 21 for airplay worldwide in October 2010.

In addition to its alternative sub-culture, the area is home to a large number of culturally diverse families and has a significant Aboriginal population. Catalina Park, commonly known as the Gully, was declared an Aboriginal Place in May 2002. It is an ecologically and culturally sensitive area with a long history of occupation by the Gundungarra and Darug tribes.

The Gundungurra Tribal Council Aboriginal Corporation, which is based in Katoomba, is a not-for-profit organization representing the Gundungurra traditional owners, promoting heritage and culture and providing a support for Gundungurra people connecting back to Country. Gundungurra Tribal Council Aboriginal Corporation has had a registered Native Title Claim since 1995 over their traditional lands which include the Blue Mountains and surrounding areas.

Katoomba is the home of local community radio station 89.1 Radio Blue Mountains. The local cinema is called The Edge, located on the Great Western Highway.

Since 2014, Katoomba has hosted the biennial Vertical Film Festival. There is also a live entertainment scene in Katoomba, with a wide range of music on offer at various venues, and theatre.

=== Demographics ===
At the 2021 census, the suburb of Katoomba recorded a population of 8,268. Of these:

- Aboriginal and Torres Strait Islander people made up 3.3% of the population.
- The most common ancestries were English 42%, Australian 31.1%, Irish 17.6%, Scottish 13.9% and German 6%.
- 73.3% of people were born in Australia. The next most common countries of birth was England 5.6% and New Zealand 2.0%.
- 86% of people spoke only English at home.
- The most common responses for religion were No Religion 55.4%, Catholic 12.4% and Anglican 9.5%.
- The median age was 48 years, compared to the national median of 38 years. Children aged under 15 years made up 13.8% of the population (national average is 18.2%) and people aged 65 years and over made up 23.6% of the population (national average is 17.2%).
- The median household weekly income was $1,171, compared to the national median of $1,746.
- 55.4% of households were family households, 39.5% were single-person households and 5.1% were group households. The average household size was 2.1 people.

== Tourism ==
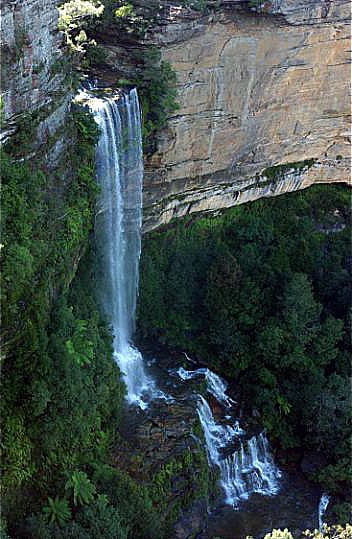
Katoomba Falls on the Kedumba River

Katoomba's main industry is tourism based on its mountain scenery. The rock formation known as the Three Sisters, viewable from Echo Point about 2 kilometres (1.2 mi) south of the main town, attracts thousands of visitors each year. Other features of the Jamison Valley visible from Echo Point include Mount Solitary and the rock formation known as the Ruined Castle. A short walk from Echo Point leads to the Giant Stairway which provides access to a number of nature walks through the Valley. Several of the Jamison Valley tracks, including the Stairway itself, were closed in recent years due to maintenance, but most have since been re-opened. The local geography includes extensive areas of dense warm temperate rainforest, hanging swamps and a series of waterfalls.

Other attractions include Scenic World, a tourist complex in the southwest of the town. This site is home to the steepest funicular railway in the world, the Katoomba Scenic Railway, which was originally built to facilitate coal and oil shale mining in the Jamison Valley. Scenic World also offers the Scenic Skyway cable car, which travels over an arm of the Jamison Valley and offers views of Katoomba Falls and Orphan Rock. In 2004 the original Skyway car was replaced by a new car with a liquid crystal panel floor, which becomes transparent while the car travels. In 1983 construction began at the site on a roller coaster called the Orphan Rocker; the track was completed, but this attraction has never been opened to the public.

Katoomba is served by hotels and guest-houses, the oldest of which is the Carrington Hotel, established in 1882 and occupying the highest point in town. The town centre, centred on Katoomba Street, features dozens of cafes and restaurants, including the Paragon which dates to the early 20th century, as well as a number of second-hand book and antique stores.

== Transport ==
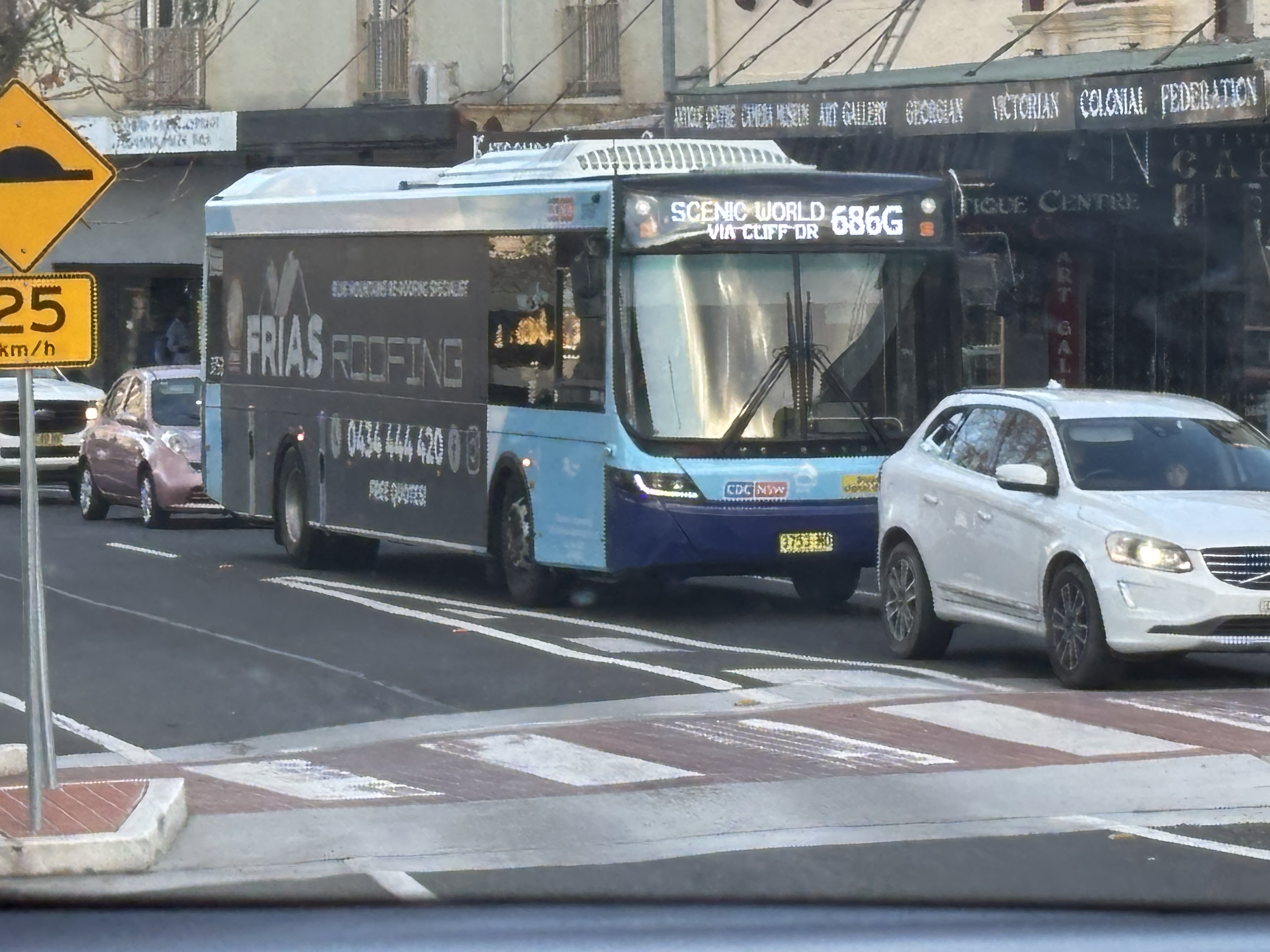
A bus on Bathurst Road

Katoomba was connected to the Main Western railway line in 1874, when the station was called "The Crushers". Katoomba railway station is now served by the Blue Mountains Line. The weekly Outback Xplorer from Sydney to Broken Hill also stops at Katoomba.

Katoomba is also serviced by buses operated by Blue Mountains Transit, Katoomba Taxis, and other cab services. Often doing routes between Scenic World and other attractions around Katoomba.

The Great Western Highway is the main road access route.

Katoomba Airfield is also located about 11.5 kilometres (7.1 mi) by road north of the Katoomba Central Business District. The airfield is currently closed to airplanes and helicopters, but is available for use by emergency services.

== Media ==
Local radio is served by CADA, a music radio station that broadcast on 96.1 FM and Radio Blue Mountains 89.1, a not-for-profit, all volunteer community radio station serving the Blue Mountains since 1993.

Other radio stations that broadcast to the town and the Blue Mountains region are mostly broadcast from Sydney such as ABC Radio Sydney, Nova 96.9, 2Day FM, Gold 101.7, KIIS 1065, Triple M Sydney and 2GB.

The local newspaper is served by the Blue Mountains Gazette which publishes daily.

Katoomba receives the five free-to-air television networks replayed from Sydney:

- ABC
- SBS
- Nine
- Seven
- Ten

== Services ==
Katoomba is the home of the Blue Mountains District ANZAC Memorial Hospital.

== Education ==
Katoomba has a high school and a primary school.

== Heritage listings ==
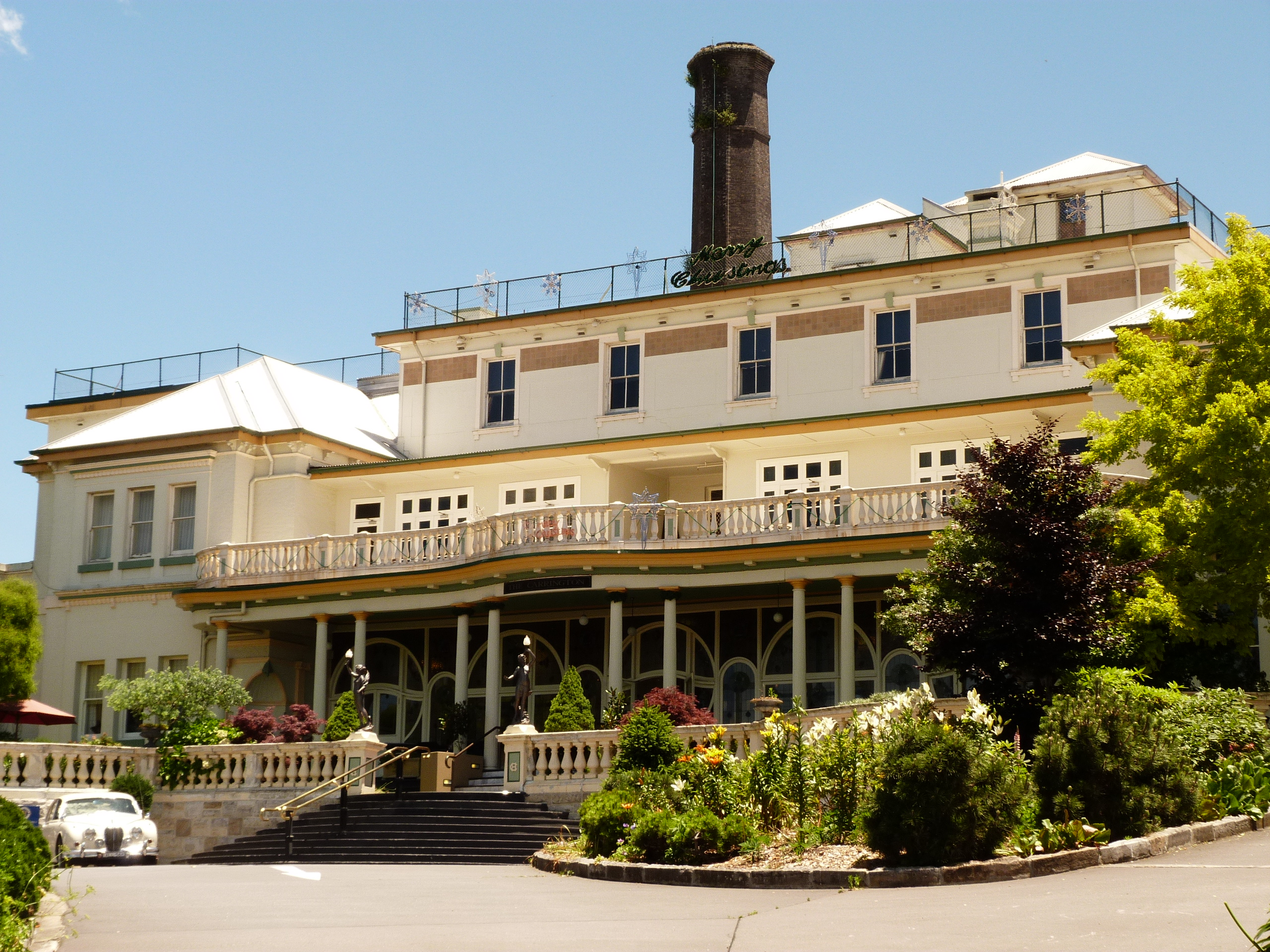
Heritage-listed Carrington Hotel

Katoomba has a number of heritage-listed sites, including the following listed on the New South Wales State Heritage Register:

- Blue Mountains National Park: Blue Mountains walking tracks
- 10–14 Civic Place: Mount St Marys College and Convent
- Katoomba Street: Carrington Hotel
- 59–61 Katoomba Street: Katoomba Post Office
- 63–69 Katoomba Street: Paragon Cafe, Katoomba; also listed on the (now defunct) Register of the National Estate.
- Main Western railway: Katoomba railway station
- 10–16 Panorama Drive: Lilianfels, Katoomba

The following are listed on other heritage registers:

- Uniting Church: situated in Katoomba Street, the Uniting Church—formerly the Methodist Church—has survived as an example of Gothic styles that have stretched from the Victorian era to the inter-war period. It was designed by Henry Simonson and the main building was constructed in 1888. The parsonage was built in 1906 and the church hall in 1933.
- Swiss Cottage (formerly known as Lurline Cottage): this Federation Queen Anne cottage was built in 1898 on the east side of Lurline Street. Incorporating parts of the original St Hilda's Church hall, it belonged to H.A. Bundy, who called it Rubyston. It had a number of owners over the years and later served as a guest house, but deteriorated somewhat until the late 1980s, when a new owner opened it as the Lurline Cottage Tea Room. It became the Swiss Cottage Restaurant in the 1990s. Since 2012 it has been Pins on Lurline.
- Kapsalie: this Federation Bungalow-style home was built in Lurline Street in 1915. The owner was Mrs. Fanny Allibone, who called the house Cheltenham. It changed hands in 1919, and the Varipatis family eventually acquired it in around 1940. This family ran a seafood restaurant in Katoomba, and they named the house Kapsalie after their home town in Greece.
- Katoomba Court House: by the 1890s, Katoomba had grown enough to need its own court house, which was designed by the Government Architect, Walter Liberty Vernon, and built in 1897. It was constructed of sandstone obtained from local quarries. By 1925, the work of the court had increased to the point where the old building was too small, so extensions were designed by Richard Wells. Further changes and extensions took place in the late 1940s and 1989. The court house is listed on the Register of the National Estate.
- Varuna: this house in Cascade Street was built in 1939. It was the home of Eleanor Dark and Dr Eric Dark, who moved to Cascade Street in 1923. Their new home, built in 1939, was designed by Eleanor Dark. The Darks were extremely active in the writers' community of the Blue Mountains, which flourished as a result of many writers and artists moving to the area. Varuna became central to this community in the 1940s. It became a writers' centre in 1989, under the name Varuna, The Writers' House. The house, studio and garden are all listed as being of heritage significance.
