= Duanju =

Chinese micro web dramas

Duanju (Chinese: 短剧; pinyin: duǎn jù; sometimes translated in English as microdrama, short drama, vertical drama, vertical minidrama, vertical series, or mobile drama) is a type of short form web or television series that originated in China. The series typically feature 1–2 minute episodes. A series may include 20 to 100 episodes, resulting in a total runtime comparable in some cases to that of one or two feature films. Produced specifically for smartphone viewing, many are shot in vertical format and optimized for fragmented, bite-sized consumption on platforms such as Douyin. Some titles are further adapted into interactive film-style mobile games. Duanju is characterized by fast-paced plots and heightened melodrama, with common themes including revenge, organized crime, wealth and status, and romantic relationships.

== Terminology ==
The Chinese term duanju literally means "short drama", and is sometimes used in English-language contexts, particularly in academic and industry discourse. Duanju is alternatively termed Weiduanju (微短剧). It's worth noting that duanju in Chinese language also refers to "sketch comedy," especially in Taiwan.

== History ==
=== Emergence and development in China ===
The narrative of duanju is deeply embedded in the Chinese web fictions which began around 2002. These fictions were written by users on websites such as Qidian and were released in installments, where readers had the option to pay per chapter or a subscription.

Although media companies have previously experimented with producing spin-offs of popular television shows for mobile phone viewing since the early 2000s with series such as 24: Conspiracy and Lost: Missing Pieces, the duanju format traces its roots to comedy sketches and serialized short videos that began appearing on Chinese short-video platforms such as Douyin (the Chinese version of TikTok) and Kuaishou around 2018. Kuaishou was among the first platforms to recognize the commercial potential of the format, launching a dedicated section called "Kuaishou Small Theatre" in 2019. Video-form duanju had earlier antecedents on Youku Tudou beginning in 2013, while the narrative conventions of the genre draw heavily on Chinese web fiction

In 2020, the National Radio and Television Administration formally recognized the duanju as a distinct genre of online audiovisual content. Between 2020 and 2022, the format became increasingly professionalized, with standardized vertical 9:16 shooting, fast production cycles (often under two weeks), and monetization through freemium or pay-per-episode models.

The industry experienced explosive growth from 2022 onward. By June 2024, the number of duanju users in China had reached 576 million, representing 52.4 percent of the country's total internet users. By the end of 2024, domestic viewership had reached approximately 662 million, and the market generated over 50 billion yuan (approximately US$7 billion). By 2025, this figure had grown to an estimated RMB 63–65 billion in direct content market revenue, with the free ad-driven model having displaced paid episode unlocks as the dominant monetization structure. The sector is also estimated to have created over 600,000 jobs. Duanju (short or vertical drama) have thus become one of the fastest-growing sectors of the Chinese entertainment industry.

=== International expansion ===
==== Africa ====
Duanju began going viral in Africa around 2025.

==== France ====
In spring 2023, the first French duanju series, Next Door Adventure, was released on Facebook on Guillaume Sanjorge's page, where it accumulated several hundred thousand views before later being distributed on an Asian platform. In January 2024, French outlets including France Inter, France Info, Midi Libre and Courrier International introduced ReelShort as the "TikTok of series," marking its first broad media coverage in France.

On November 23, 2024, the first public screening of duanju series took place, organized by the association Studio Phocéen. In June 2024, the French newspaper Le Monde reported on the arrival of short vertical series in France, mainly distributed via the ReelShort app, and noted their growing popularity among younger audiences. Since 2025, the Asian platform Stardust TV has also expanded into France. Among its new titles is the French vertical series Next Door Adventure, produced by Guillaume Sanjorge. It is the first French series to be distributed on an Asian platform dedicated to vertical mobile fiction. On June 14, 2025, the association Studio Phocéen brought together an international panel of creators and producers to explore the growing potential of this format. British producer Adam Gee was among the participants.

In July 2025, Gaëtan Bruel, president of the Centre national du cinéma et de l'image animée, mentioned the format for the first time during an official visit to Asia. In August 2025, journalist Jade Hin-Cellura from the magazine Geo published an article on Hollywood's enthusiasm for Chinese mini-series, highlighting Duanju as a rapidly growing format. The Canadian French-language daily La Presse also published an article by Mathieu Perreault describing the rise of the format in France. Producer Guillaume Sanjorge noted that while early European series mostly adapt Chinese works, the format could expand in the West.

Many in France have warned of the corrosive effects duanju could have on French art and culture. A France Inter podcast, an article from Le Figaro, and a speech by the president of the CNC, Gaëtan Bruel, who described the micro-drama as "the perfect counter-example" of what France should stand for. French producer Guillaume Sanjorge wants a more proactive reading of the phenomenon. In an interview with the professional media outlet Ecran Total, he said that France could become the "European champion" of this emerging industry if it succeeds in structuring a production and distribution ecosystem adapted to these new formats.

On 5 March 2026, mediaClub International organized a roundtable in Paris dedicated to the format, with the participation of Bo Zhang and Guillaume Sanjorge. The discussion focused on the international rise of the format, its production and monetization models, as well as its development prospects in France. In May 2026, the series King Gandolfi by Guillaume Sanjorge, starring Jean-Pierre Castaldi, Marthe Villalonga, became one of the first Duanju-format series screened in Toulon, France, as part of the MEDSERIES program dedicated to audiovisual series linked to Mediterranean heritage and the territories of Provence.

Xinhua reported that, at a Sino-European micro-drama summit held at the Musée Guimet in Paris in October 2026, Sanjorge presented a mobile app named "Duanju", which he said was named in tribute to China's role in developing the format.

==== Germany ====
In 2026, the German public broadcaster Deutschlandfunk Kultur dedicated a segment, in the program "Breitband" hosted by Hagen Terschüren, to deepfakes, digital technologies, and duanju. Guillaume SanJorge appears in the segment to discuss the role of platforms in analyzing audience behavior and adapting content accordingly.

==== Thailand ====
In 2026, Chinese short dramas, or ’duanju’ have rapidly gained popularity in Thailand.

==== United States ====
In 2022, Chinese duanju companies began aggressively pursuing international markets, particularly targeting the United States. To appeal to English-speaking audiences, these firms have collaborated with American and British production houses to localize content. This is achieved either through dubbing existing Chinese series or by re-creating the entire series with English-speaking actors. These international productions maintain a lean, high-efficiency model—often filmed on shoestring budgets in as little as ten days for an entire season. By the first quarter of 2025, locally produced titles had come to dominate international performance: 80 percent of the top 20 vertical drama titles by revenue internationally were locally produced, signaling a structural shift away from translated Chinese content.

ReelShort and DramaBox, the two largest Chinese short-drama platforms operating overseas, entered the U.S. market in 2022 and 2023, respectively. By August 2025, DramaBox had surpassed 100 million downloads on Google Play alone, while maintaining an average of 44 million monthly active users. Meanwhile, ReelShort surpassed 370 million downloads and raked in $700 million in revenue. By 2025, the U.S. had become the single largest revenue market outside China for vertical drama, generating approximately $58 million in monthly in-app revenue and an estimated $1.3 billion for the full year. As of 2025, ReelShort and DramaBox are the top two duanju platforms in terms of downloads and active users.

In 2025, Netflix adopted a vertical mobile feed. Journalist Isabelle Deromas Lebocq saw it as a sign of the growing influence of the duanju format. In July 2025, DramaBox was selected by Disney to join the Disney Accelerator program, confirming the growing interest of major American studios in micro-dramas.

Holywater Tech launched in 2024 the mobile application My Drama, a platform for broadcasting short vertical series of two to three minutes. The platform quickly gained a growing user base in the US and Europe and generates millions of dollars in annual revenue. In August 2025, the Canadian French-language daily La Presse reported that My Drama had become the dominant platform in Europe for vertical micro-series. As of September 2025, My Drama has reached over 40 million lifetime users. In October 2025, Holywater Tech announced a strategic content deal with Fox Entertainment to produce over 200 vertical series for the My Drama platform. In early 2026, FOX Entertainment and Dhar Mann partnered to create 40 original microdrama series for the My Drama platform. During the same period, the platform's parent company bought the AI studio Jeynix.

Notable platforms in the US include CandyJar and GoodShort. Notable actors include Joseph Purcell.

In September 2026, actor James Franco became the first major Hollywood performer to headline a duanju, starring in "Love, Lies & Frank" on the Israeli app Shortical. The production was made under SAG-AFTRA's new Verticals Agreement, launched in October 2025 for serialized vertical dramas.

== Content and characteristics ==
=== Format ===
Duanju are filmed vertically in a 9:16 aspect ratio, designed to fill the entire screen of a smartphone held in portrait orientation. Episodes are structured to deliver maximum narrative intensity in minimal time, with cliffhangers engineered to appear at the end of nearly every episode to encourage continued viewing. The storytelling style is intentionally fast-paced and emotionally heightened. Unlike the majority of content on platforms such as TikTok, duanju are professionally produced with hired actors and crew, rather than being user-generated content.

=== Genres ===
The most popular genres include romance (particularly stories involving billionaire or CEO characters), revenge narratives, identity-reveal plots, chuanyue, xianxia, wuxia, romance, drama and family drama. In the American market, the audience skews heavily toward women aged 30 to 60, who gravitate particularly toward romance, CEO storylines, and revenge-driven narratives.

Some of the format's most commercially successful titles internationally include The Double Life of My Billionaire Husband, which accumulated over 500 million views on ReelShort, and The Divorced Billionaire Heiress, which was produced for less than US$200,000 and reportedly grossed approximately US$35 million in North America.

== Industry ==
=== Production ===
Early duanju were produced with minimal budgets and small teams of around 12 people. As the industry matured, production values and crew sizes increased substantially. By 2025, duanju production crews in China typically numbered between 60 and 90 people, spanning roles in directing, cinematography, lighting, costumes, props, and production management. However, budgets remain far below those of traditional television or film, with some successful productions costing as little as US$50,000. In Western markets such as the United States, productions typically cost between $150,000 and $250,000 for a 7–10 day shoot producing 50 to 70 or more episodes, with cast and locations representing the two largest cost categories.

=== Monetization ===
The business model of microdrama platforms is structurally closer to mobile gaming than to traditional streaming. Three monetization models are in use. The IAP (in-app purchase) model requires users to pay to unlock episodes individually or in bundles, with individual episodes typically priced at $0.30–$0.50 and full series at $10–$15, and dominates in high-income markets such as the United States. The IAA (in-app advertising) model offers free content supported entirely by advertising, and is prevalent in price-sensitive markets such as Southeast Asia and Latin America. The hybrid IAAP model combines free episodes, paywalls, rewarded advertising, and optional subscription tiers, and is the most prevalent model globally. In China, the ad-driven IAA model had by 2025 overtaken IAP as the dominant revenue structure, while international markets continued to rely more heavily on IAP. Globally, the microdrama industry generated an estimated $11 billion in revenue in 2025.

=== Platforms and distribution ===
==== Chinese domestic platforms ====
Within China, microdramas are distributed primarily through the short-video ecosystems of the country's major technology companies. The industry's three major domestic platform operators are ByteDance (through its Hongguo brands and Douyin), Tencent (through WeChat Video Accounts), and Kuaishou (through its Xi Fan brand). In 2024, the number of native short dramas launched on Douyin alone exceeded 20,000. Among these platforms, Hongguo Duanju （Hongguo brands) is the platform with the most active users in China. QuestMobile data reported in July 2026 put the May 2026 monthly active user figure for Hongguo Duanju at approximately 395 million. These platforms draw heavily on intellectual property pipelines from web fiction publishers such as China Literature and Tomato Novel.

==== International apps ====
A growing ecosystem of dedicated mobile applications serves international audiences. According to data from Sensor Tower, the major platforms include:

- ReelShort — Operated by Crazy Maple Studio, ReelShort is among the most widely downloaded microdrama apps globally. It reported approximately US$400 million in revenue in 2024. Women comprise 70 percent of its 45 million monthly active users, half of whom are based in the United States.
- DramaBox — Operated by StoryMatrix, DramaBox reported US$323 million in revenue and US$10 million in net profit in 2024.
- GoodShort — Recognized for cinematic production quality and a focus on Chinese drama adapted for English-speaking audiences.

Above are the top three. Other apps (4 to 10) in the market include ShortMax, NetShort, DramaWave, FlickReels, MoboReels, Kalos TV and My Drama. A broader analysis of the competitive landscape across the top 20 platforms operating in the U.S. market identifies distinct tiers among these apps, ranging from early system-builders such as ReelShort and DramaBox to newer entrants competing on content differentiation and AI-assisted production.

=== Copyright concerns ===
Due to the short production cycle and low cost, if a script becomes popular, many companies will rush to imitate it, resulting in the same plot flooding the internet, leading to sense of exhaustion, infringing on the original creator's copyright and other intellectual property rights. In May 2026, the media outlet Duanju News reported a concrete case of piracy involving Shortflix. The catalog of Stardust TV, as well as the series Next Door Adventures by Sanjorge Production, were reported as being distributed and sold without authorization.

In June 2026, the National Radio and Television Administration implemented a campaign to against "harmful, lowbrow, and pirated" content in the micro-drama field. Among other areas, the campaign seeks to eliminate material deemed as harmful to children, wealth-flaunting, overly-sexualized, or which includes copyright infringing material.

== See also ==
- Hongguo Duanju
- DramaBox
- My Drama
- ReelShort
