= Katoomba Falls =

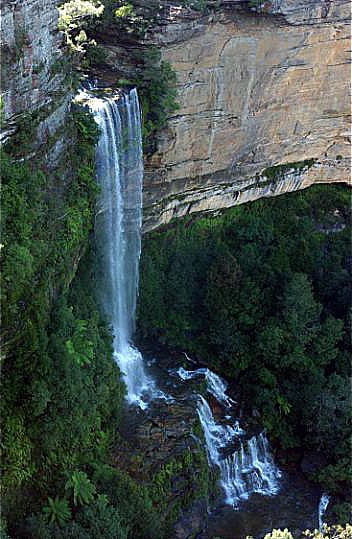
- Katoomba Falls, pictured in 2013.

- Location within New South Wales
- Location: Blue Mountains, New South Wales, Australia
- Coordinates: 33°43′39″S 150°18′16″E
- Type: Segmented
- Watercourse: Kedumba River

The Katoomba Falls is a segmented waterfall that is located close to Echo Point near Katoomba on the Kedumba River descending into the Jamison Valley located within the Blue Mountains National Park in the Blue Mountains region of New South Wales, Australia. The Scenic World Skyway travels across the gorge and provides views of the falls.

A tourist park with unpowered and powered camp sites and cabins is located near the head of the waterfall on Scenic Drive.

== Gallery ==
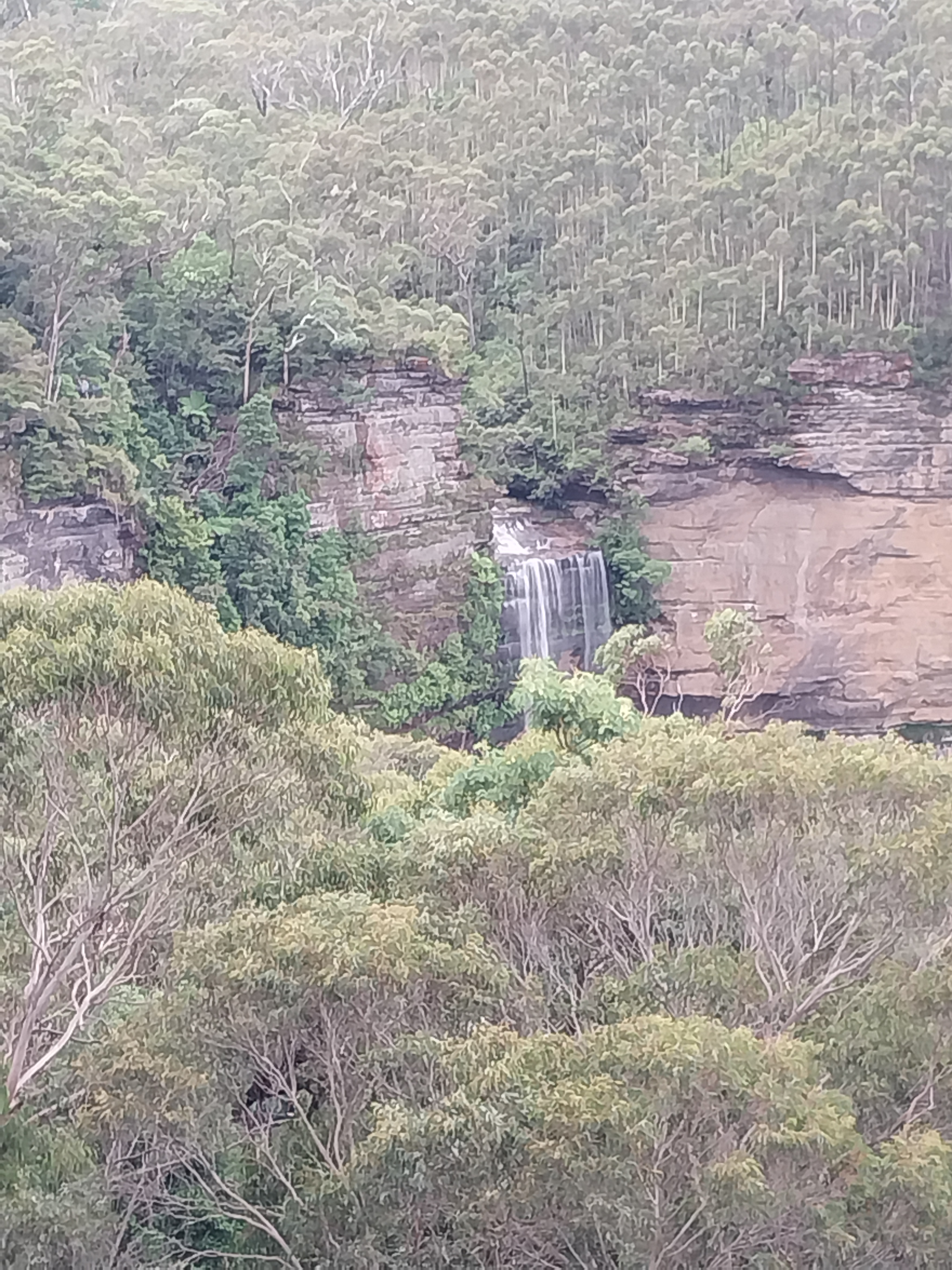
The Katoomba Falls in January 2025

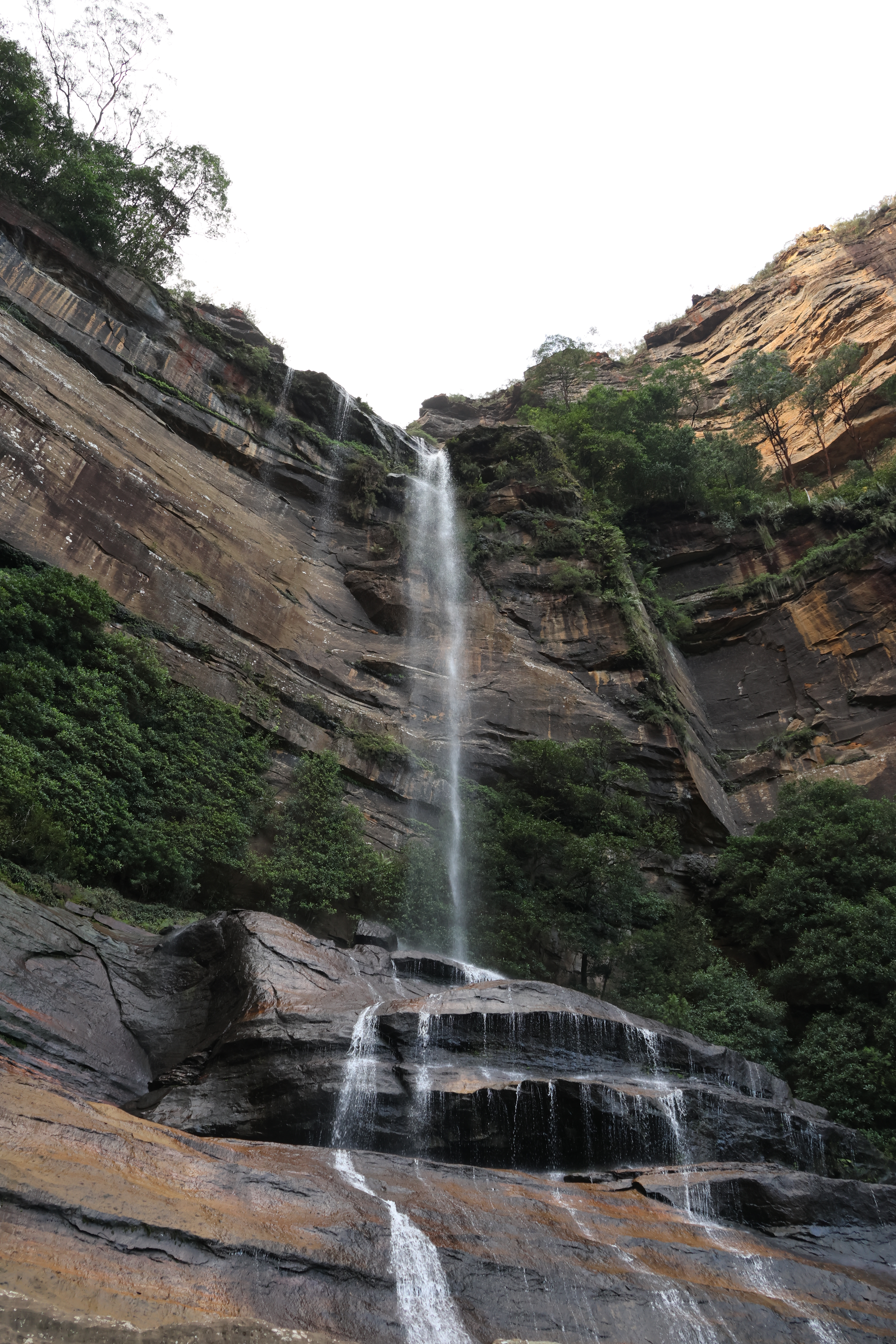
Looking upwards from the bottom

== See also ==
- List of waterfalls
- List of waterfalls in Australia
