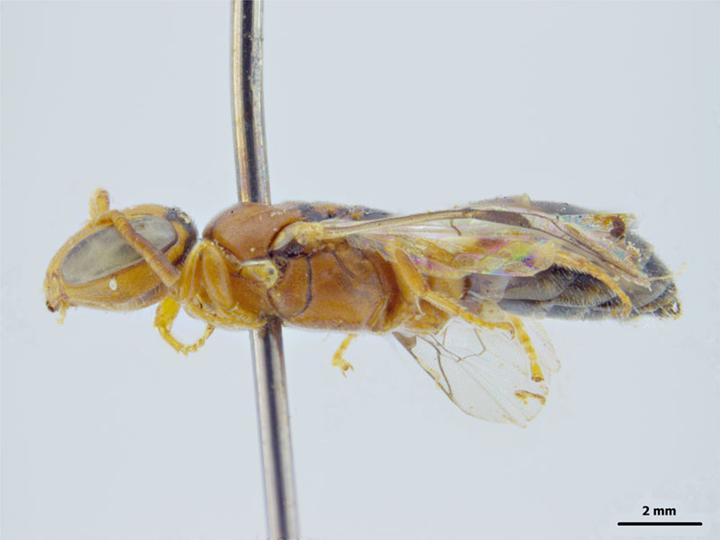
- Female

Scientific classification
- Kingdom: Animalia
- Phylum: Arthropoda
- Clade: Pancrustacea
- Class: Insecta
- Order: Hymenoptera
- Family: Colletidae
- Genus: Hylaeus
- Species: H. bicolorellus

Binomial name
- Hylaeus bicolorellus Michener, 1965

Synonyms
- Sphaerhylaeus bicoloratus Rayment, 1948

= Hylaeus bicolorellus =

Species of bee

Hylaeus bicolorellus, or Hylaeus (Sphaerhylaeus) bicolorellus, is a species of bee in the family Colletidae and subfamily Hylaeinae. It is endemic to Australia. It was described by American entomologist Charles Duncan Michener in 1965.

== Distribution and habitat ==
The species occurs in eastern mainland Australia. The type locality is Narrow Neck in the Blue Mountains of New South Wales.

== Behaviour ==
The adults are flying mellivores. Flowering plants visited by the bees include Lambertia formosa and Telopea speciosissima.

Lambertia formosa (mountain devil), a forage plant of the bees

Lambertia formosa flowers

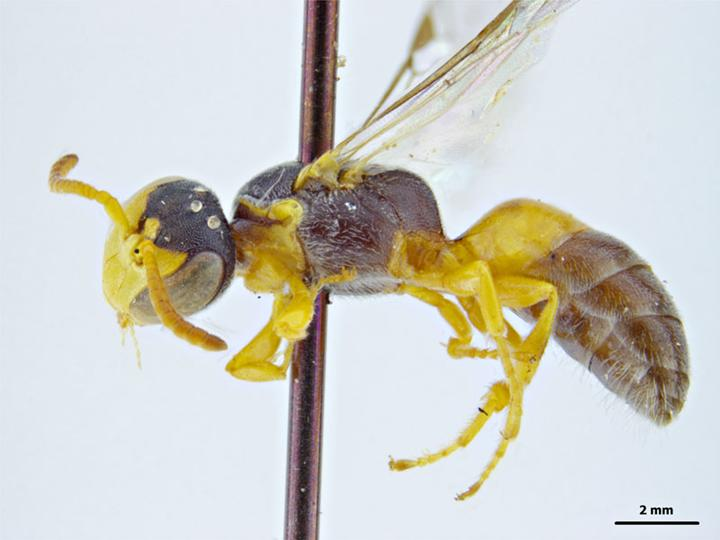
Male
