= Megalong Valley =

Valley in New South Wales, Australia

Coordinates: 33°44′00″S 150°15′00″E

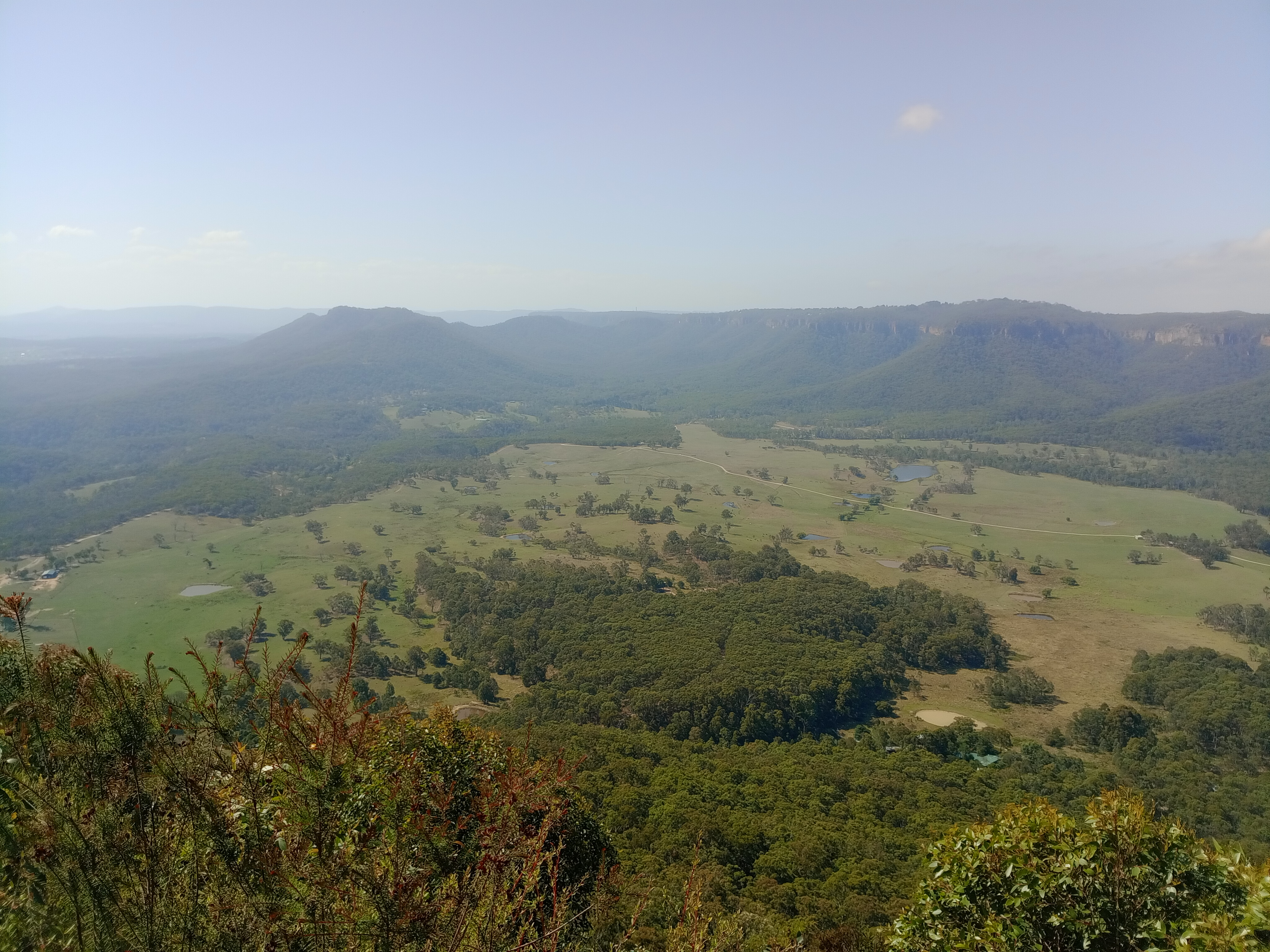
The Megalong Valley viewed from Mount Blackheath, January 2026

Megalong Valley is part of the Blue Mountains of New South Wales, Australia. It is located west of Katoomba. On its eastern side, the valley is separated from the Jamison Valley by Narrow Neck Plateau. The Shipley Plateau overlooks part of the valley.

== Description and history ==
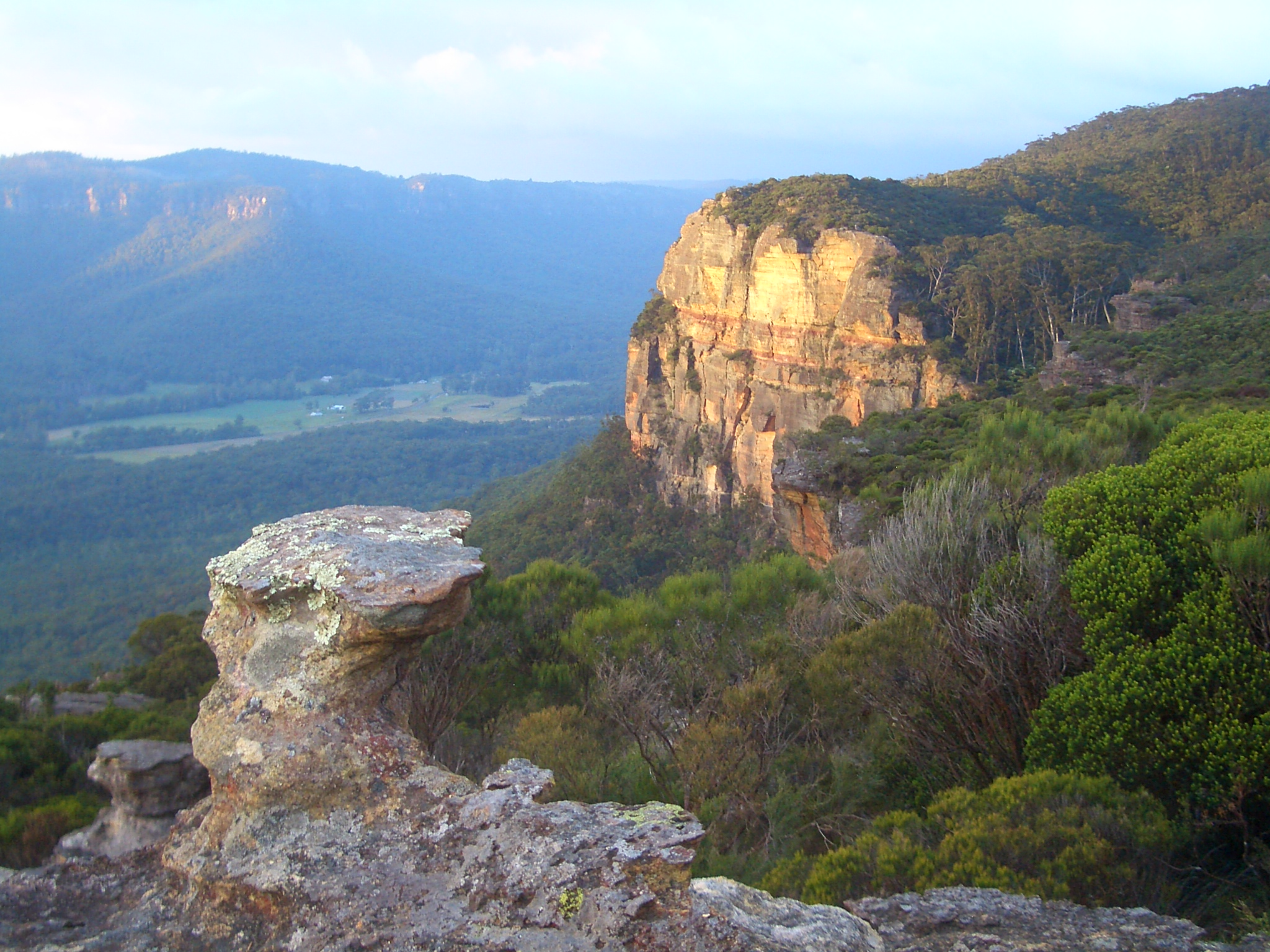
Looking from Megalong Head, across the north-western section of Megalong Valley

The name Megalong Valley is said to be derived from an Aboriginal word thought to mean "Valley Under the Rock". Megalong Valley is Gundungurra country. The first record of a European coming to the valley was of Thomas Jones, a natural history specimen collector, who followed the course of Coxs River from Hartley, New South Wales to Burragorang in 1818. The first land was taken up in 1838, by settlers who travelled from Burragorang and Camden, New South Wales.

Later in the 19th century, an oil shale mine was operated by one J. B. North. He named a nearby glen after his daughter Nellie and it is still known as Nellies Glen today. The shale mine operated from 1886 to 1896, until the reserves were exhausted. Shale was mined and taken by a horse-drawn tramway that ran in a tunnel under Narrow Neck. On the other side, it connected with the tramways from nearby coal mines and other oil shale mines at Ruined Castle. The shale then went via an inclined railway at Katoomba. In 1903, the tramway was relaid to allow stockpiled shale to be removed from the old mine site, the last activity at the old mine. There was a village, Megalong, that was associated with the shale mine; it was in ruins by the mid-1930s.

Today the valley is still used for farming, but tourism has increased since the historic Six Foot Track was restored. This track was marked out in the 19th century as a bridle trail from Katoomba to Jenolan Caves. It was called the Six Foot Track because it had to be that wide in order to accommodate two to three riders riding abreast. It fell into disuse eventually but was restored as a walking trail by the Department of Lands in 1984. It begins at the Explorers Tree at Katoomba, goes down through Nellies Glen, passes the site of the former Megalong village, then continues across Megalong Valley to Coxs River. On the other side of the river, the trail crosses some ranges before reaching Jenolan Caves Road. It then heads south to finish at Jenolan.

== See also ==
- List of valleys of Australia
