= Echo Point (lookout) =

Panoramic view in New South Wales, Australia

Coordinates: 33°43′57.76″S 150°18′43.05″E

Echo Point is a lookout about 2 kilometres (1.2 mi) south of Katoomba, New South Wales, Australia. It attracts an estimated 1.5–2 million visitors each year. The lookout offers a view to Three Sisters, Mount Solitary and the rock formation known as the Ruined Castle. A short walk from Echo Point leads to the Giant Stairway which provides access to a number of nature walks through the Jamison Valley.

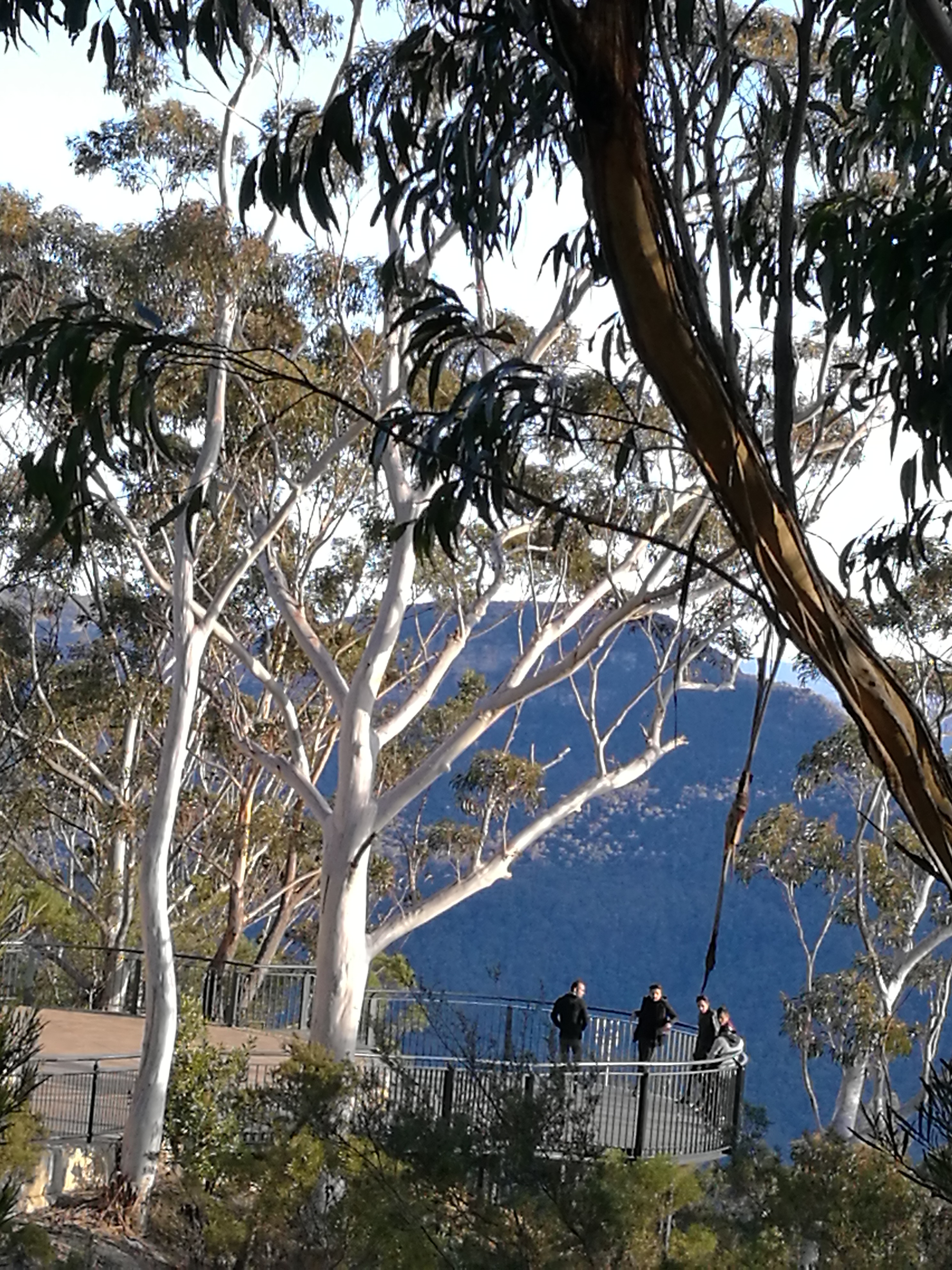
Echo Point

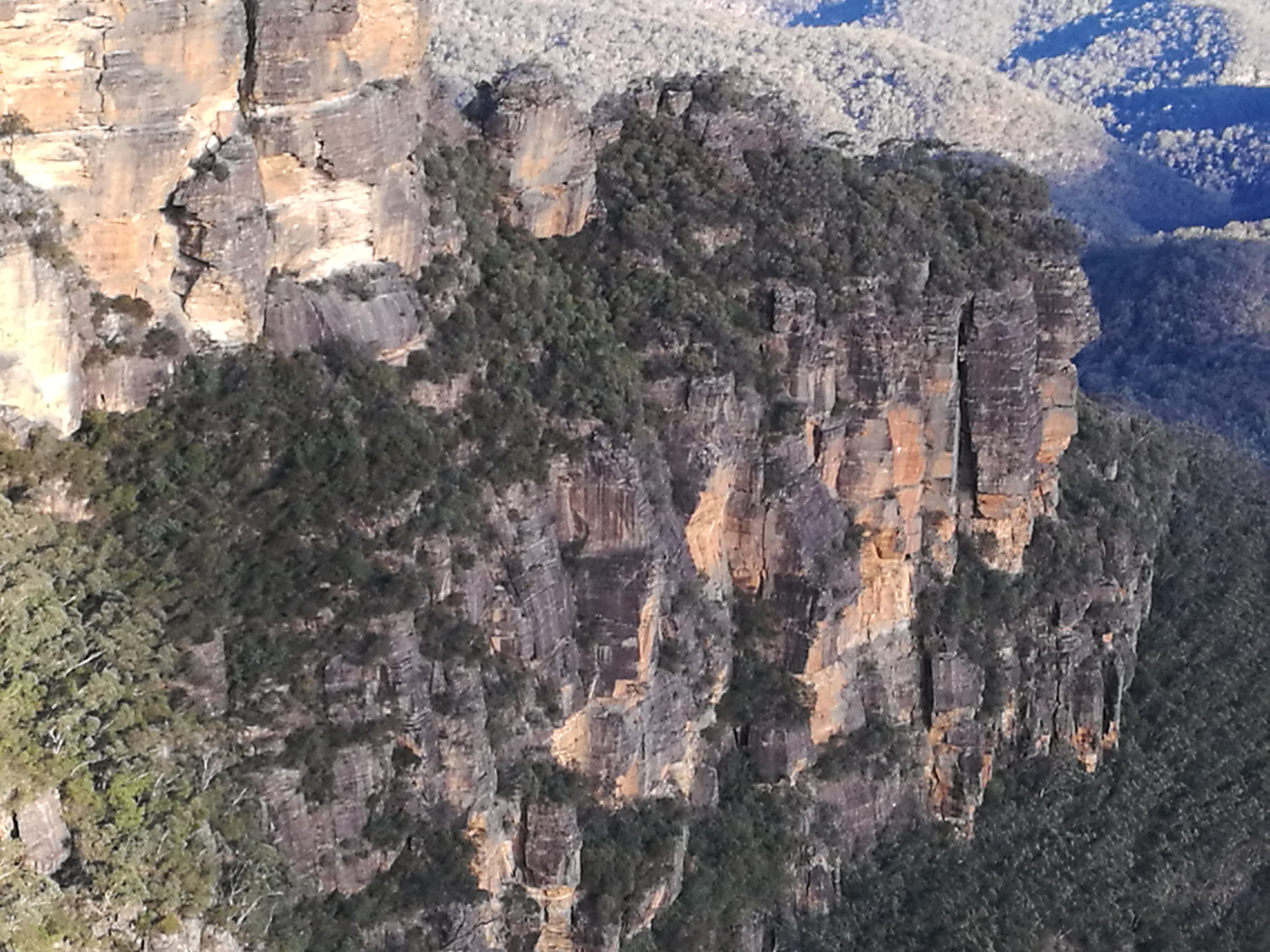
View from Echo Point

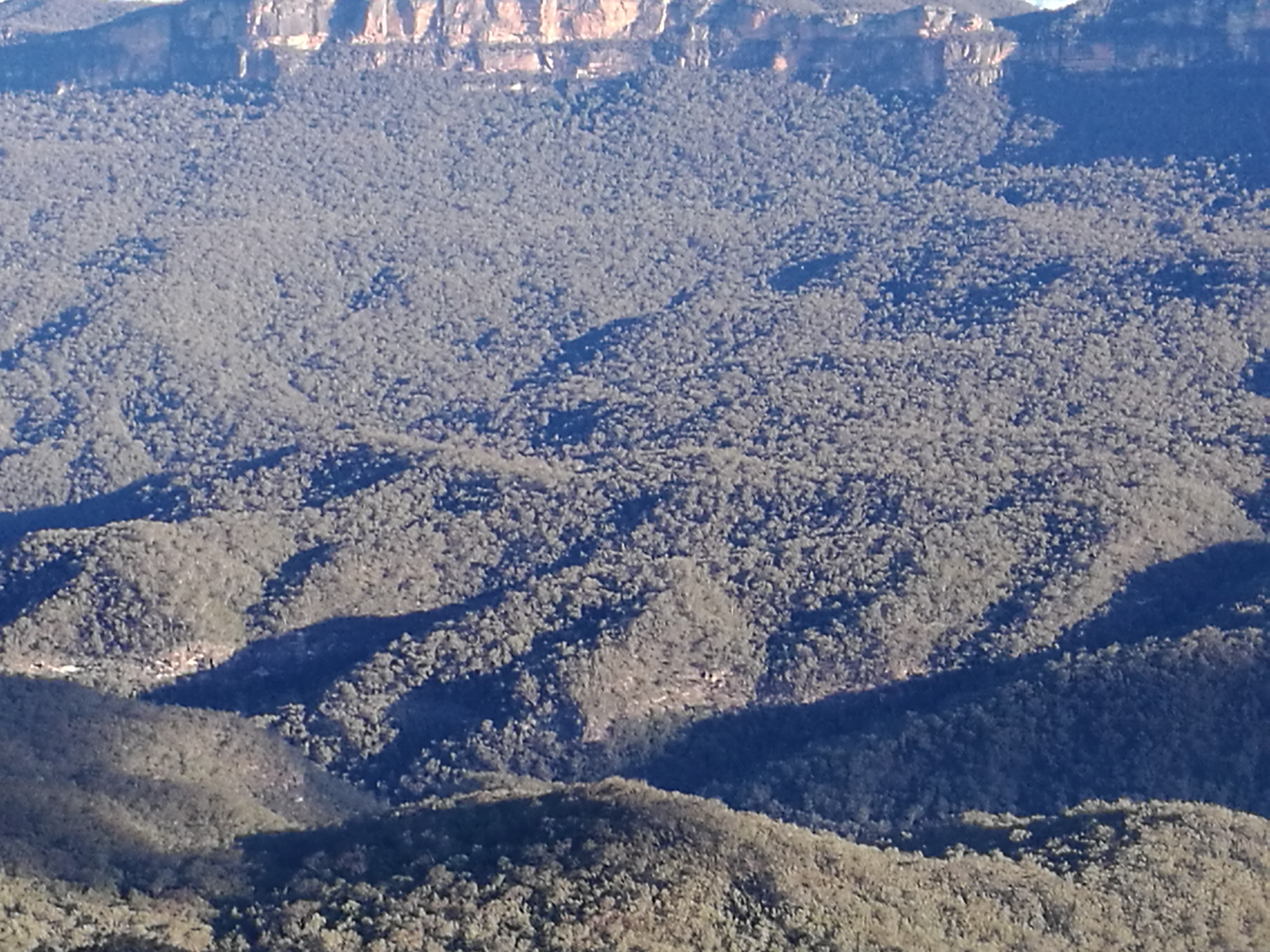
View across the Jamison Valley, from Echo Point
