= Ruined castle =

Ruined castle may refer to:

- The ruins of a castle
- Ruined Castle (rock formation), a geographical feature in Australia

== See also ==
- Category: Ruined castles
- Burgstall, the ground level ruins of a castle
