= Katoomba to Mittagong Trail =

Hiking trail in Australia

- Length: 132 km (82 mi)
- Location: NSW
- Trailheads: Katoomba Mittagong
- Use: Hiking

The Katoomba to Mittagong Trail is a 132-km long-distance walking trail that starts in the Blue Mountains at Katoomba (New South Wales, Australia) and finishes at Mittagong in the Southern Highlands.

== Description ==
Starting at Katoomba, the walk descends via the Narrow Neck Plateau to the Megalong Valley, crosses Coxs River then follows Scotts Main Range to Yerranderrie, a former silver mining town that now serves as a tourist destination. From there it heads east to cross the Wollondilly River, over the Beloon Pass then along the Nattai River and up to Mittagong. A slightly shorter but very scenic exit can be made by climbing out of the Nattai Valley on Starlights Trail. This trail starts at MacArthur's Flat and finishes at Wattle Ridge.

Highlights of the walk include views from Narrow Neck Plateau, views from Scotts Main Range, ruins of old properties along Scotts Main Range, heritage buildings and scenery at Yerranderie and scenery around Lake Burragorang. Public transport via rail is available at both start and finish. The walk is best made from north to south as the terrain is much more difficult to conquer in the opposite direction. Heading south also prevents walkers from facing towards the sun. For very fit walkers, the walk can be completed in six days, although extra time should be allowed for seeing Yerranderie if desired.
