= Ruined Castle (rock formation) =

Rock formation in New South Wales, Australia

- Stratigraphic range: Triassic
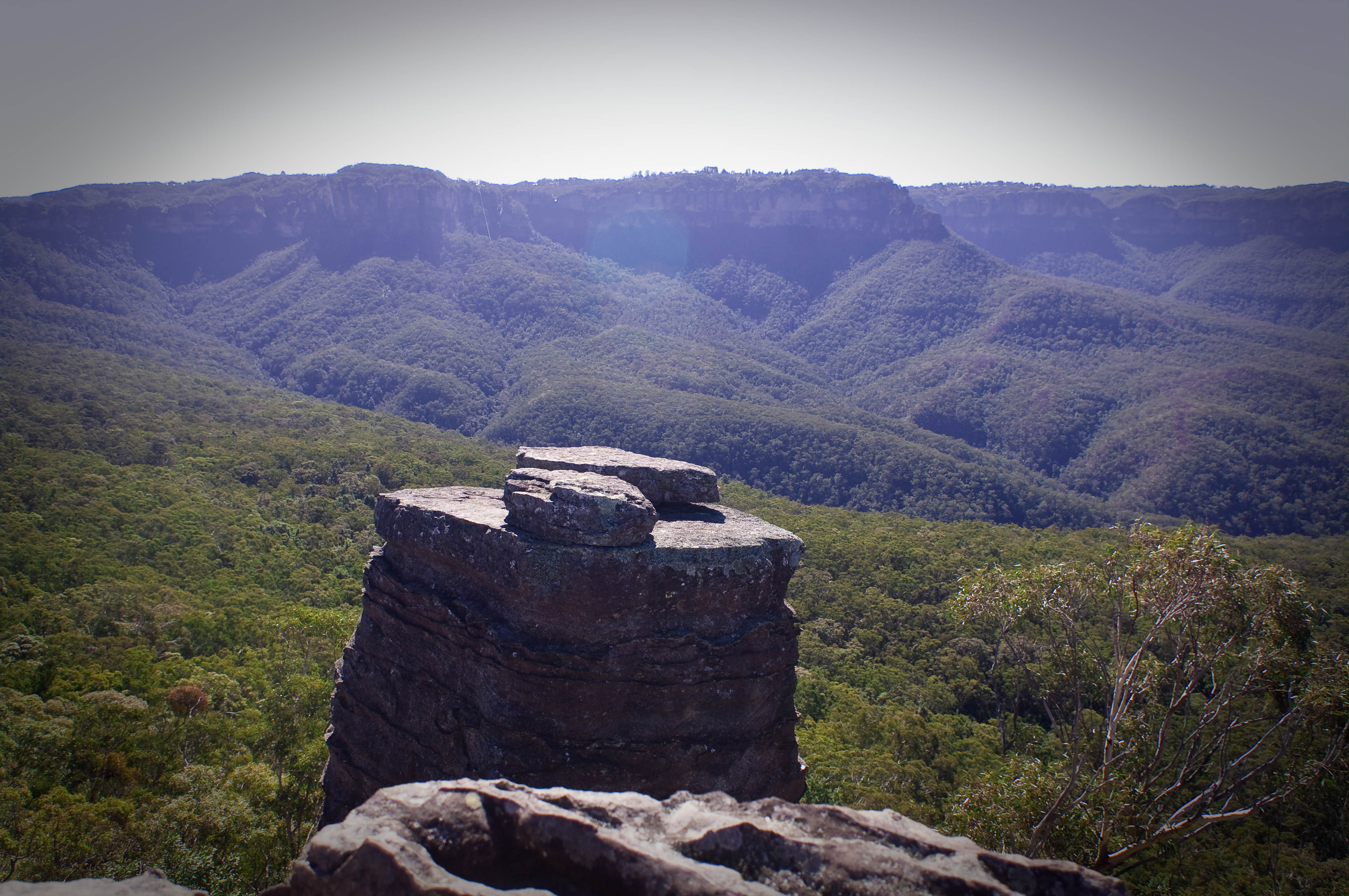
- View from the top level of the Ruined Castle in the Blue Mountains
- Type: Rock formation
- Unit of: Great Dividing Range

Lithology
- Primary: Sandstone

Location
- Coordinates: 33.763306°S 150.294033°E
- Region: Blue Mountains
- Country: Australia

Type section
- Named for: Castle-like appearance

The Ruined Castle is a rock formation in the Jamison Valley area of the Blue Mountains, in New South Wales, Australia.

== Formation ==
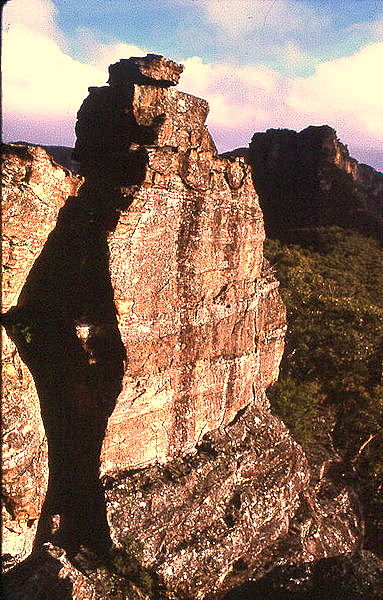
The Ruined Castle's shaft

The Ruined Castle is an outcrop of large rocky boulders that lies halfway of a ridge that starts from Castle Head, off Narrow Neck Peninsula, to Mount Solitary. A local elevated point, it is projected from the surrounding bushland, and provides panoramic views of the area.

== Geography ==
It is reached by the Federal Pass, which can be accessed via the Scenic Railway, the Furber Steps (which descend from the Round Walk) or the Golden Stairs (which descend from the Narrow Neck Plateau, south-west of Katoomba). The Federal Pass continues south-east from Ruined Castle to Mount Solitary. Near the track up to Ruined Castle are the sealed openings of several coal mine adits. In this area is a large clearing which was once home to the mining community and is now a campground.

Used as a staging point for the south end of the aerial ropeway, there were several access points to the local coal seams used by John Britty North for retrieving coal and shale oil ore back to Malaita Point. After the collapse of the ropeway, the current walking track was developed as a horse drawn rail track to connect to the rail system used connecting Malaita Point to the Megalong Valley.
