= Narrow Neck Plateau =

Landform in New South Wales, Australia

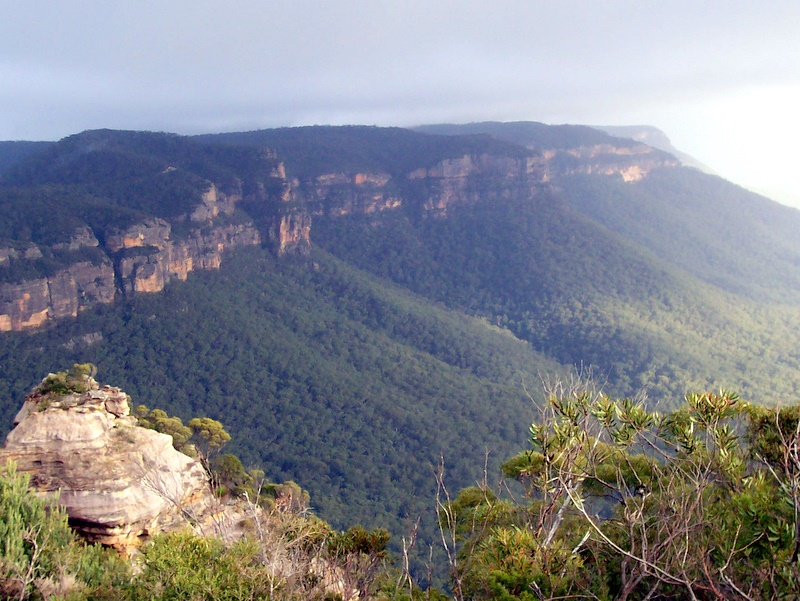
- Narrow Neck Plateau in the rain at sunset, Blue Mountains National Park

Highest point
- Elevation: 1,000 m (3,300 ft)
- Coordinates: 33°45′37″S 150°15′55″E

Geography
- Location within New South Wales
- Location: Blue Mountains, New South Wales, Australia
- Parent range: Blue Mountains

The Narrow Neck Plateau is an eroded remnant of a sandstone layer situated at an elevation of 1,000 metres (3,300 ft) above sea level and part of the Blue Mountains, a spur line of the Great Dividing Range immediately southwest of Katoomba in New South Wales, Australia, within the Blue Mountains National Park. The neck separates the Jamison Valley to the east from the Megalong Valley to the west.

== Description ==
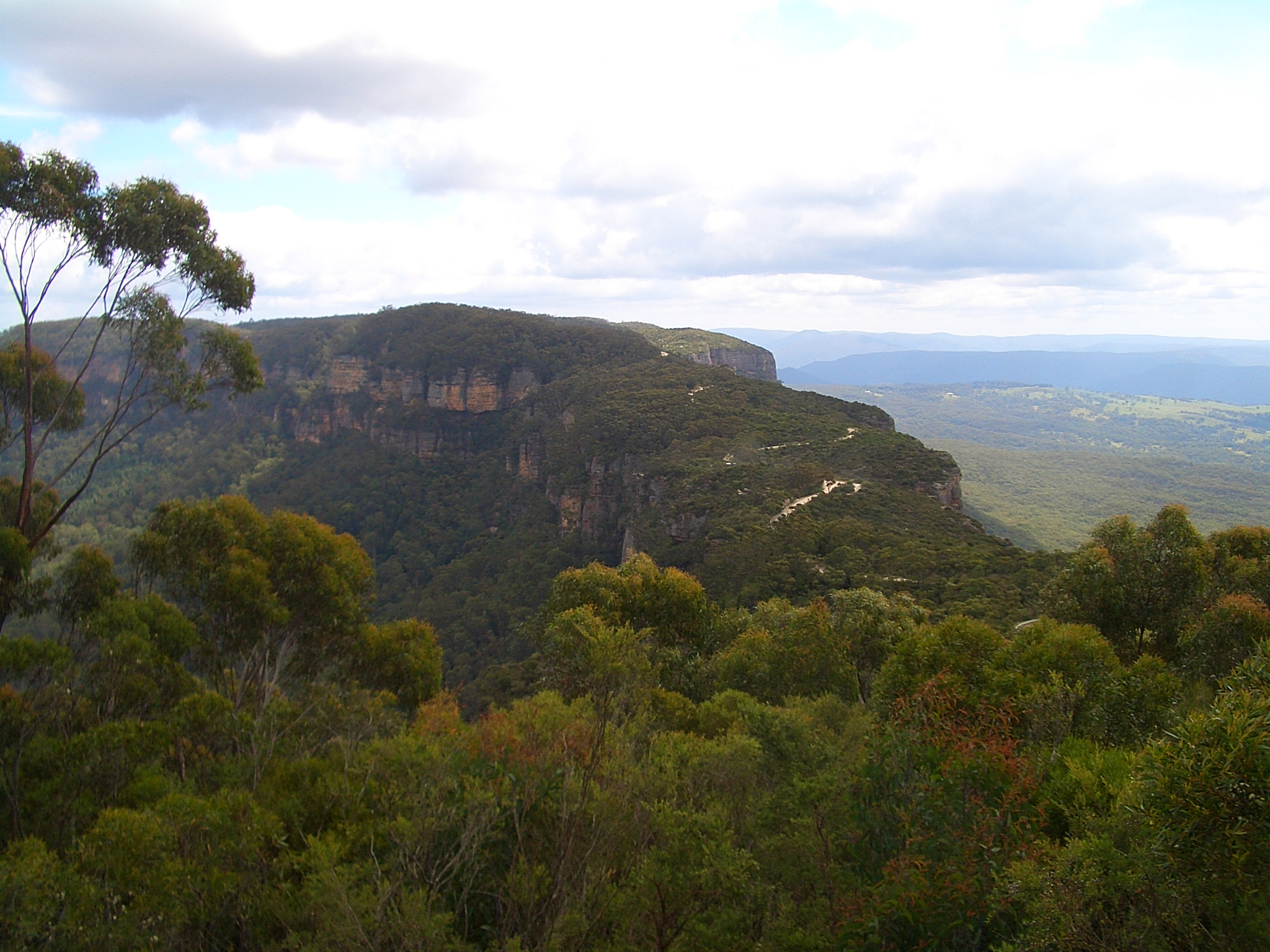
Looking south along the Narrow Neck Plateau from the Narrow Neck Lookout in Katoomba. Megalong Valley is on the right, and Jamison Valley on the left, with Glenraphael Drive climbing the plateau.

From Cliff Drive, Katoomba, the Narrow Neck is accessed via a dirt road called Glenraphael Drive suitable for most two-wheel-drive vehicles, subject to good weather conditions, as far as a locked gate. It is a popular walking, bike riding and climbing location and offers several walking descent routes to the adjacent valleys. Beyond the gate is walking/bicycle access only for the general public. One of the most popular walks is the Golden Stairs, a rough descent of approximately 200 metres (660 ft) to join the Federal Pass. This opens up the Jamison Valley for popular day walks to sites such as Mount Solitary and the Ruined Castle. The neck juts southwards from Katoomba for a distance of some 10 kilometres (6.2 mi) and ends at Clear Hill, overlooking the Wild Dog Mountains. Castle Head promontory points towards the Ruined Castle, a small rock formation between Castle Head and Mount Solitary. Arguably one of the best views on the eastern seaboard of NSW is from Narrow Neck Fire Tower. On a day of high visibility it is possible to see from Mittagong in the south to Toronto in the north and a number of peak landforms in between. It also has excellent views back towards the escarpment at Katoomba.

== Missing person ==
A nineteen-year-old British backpacker Jamie Neale was found alive after twelve days lost in the Blue Mountains. Two bushwalkers alerted emergency services who were conducting an extensive search using the Police Rescue Squad, police dogs, State Emergency Service and Rural Fire Service.

== Fauna ==
Upland swamps on Narrow Neck Plateau have been identified as potential habitats for the rare Blue Mountain Water Skink.

== Points of Interest ==
- 33°43′16″S 150°17′09″E - Cahill's Lookout
- 33°47′17″S 150°14′54″E - Carlons Head
- 33°45′21″S 150°17′14″E - Castle Head
- 33°48′40″S 150°15′55″E - Clear Hill
- 33°47′16″S 150°15′38″E - Fire Tower
- 33°44′07″S 150°16′57″E - Golden Staircase
- 33°44′27″S 150°16′48″E - Locked Gate
- 33°44′04″S 150°17′55″E - Malaita Point
- 33°43′40″S 150°17′32″E - Narrow Neck Lookout
- 33°45′48″S 150°17′38″E - Ruined Castle
- 33°48′39″S 150°15′54″E - Tarro's Ladders
- 33°44′8″S 150°18′52″E - Three Sisters Lookout

== See also ==
- List of mountains in New South Wales
