= Scenic World =

Tourist attraction in New South Wales, Australia

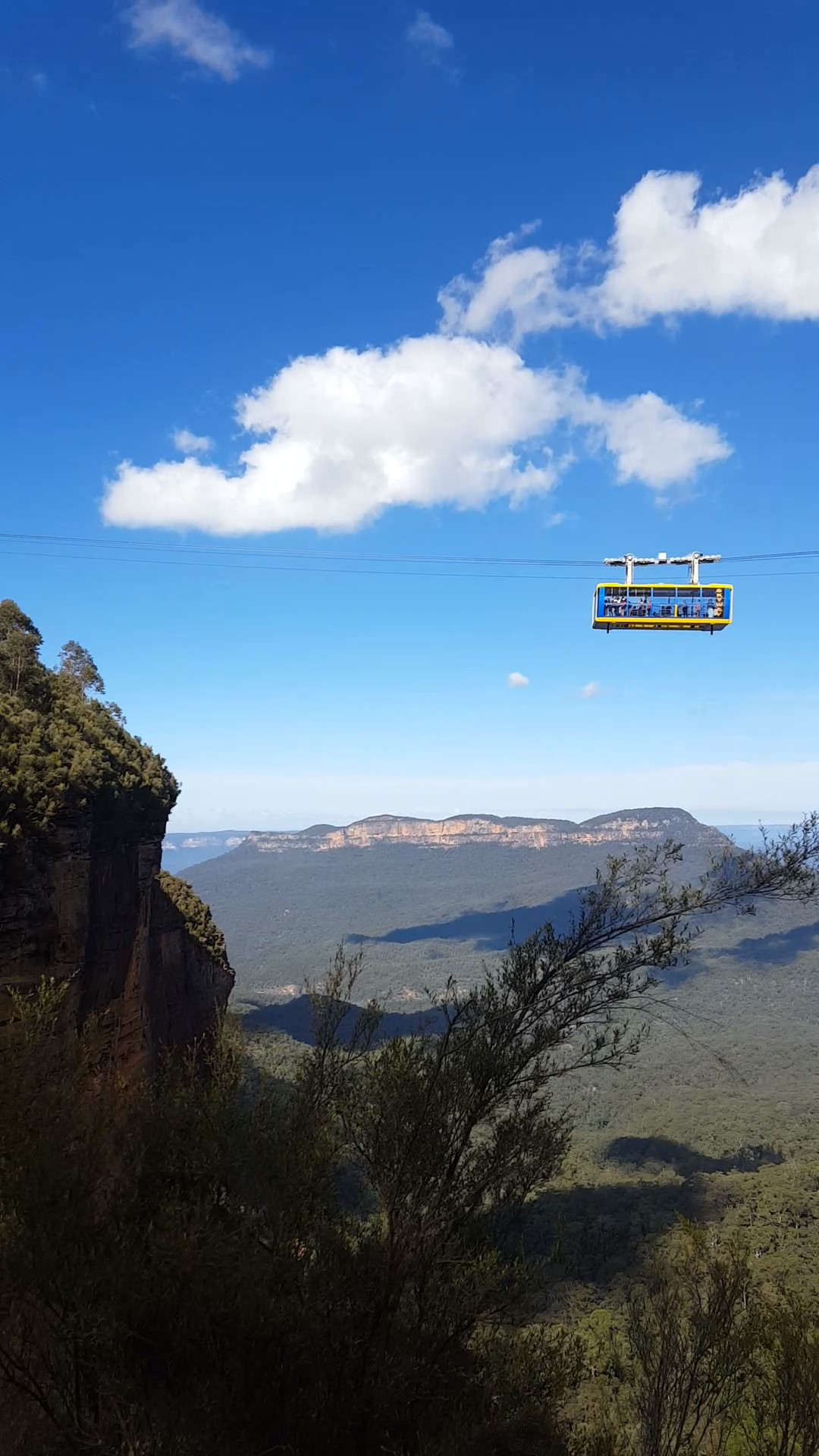
- The Skyway cable car, with Mount Solitary in the background.

- Location within New South Wales
- 33.7285°S 150.3010°E
- Nearest city: Katoomba

History
- Founder: Harry Hammon
- Built: 1945

Site notes
- Architect: Harry Hammon
- Current use: Tourist Attraction
- Website: https://scenicworld.com.au/

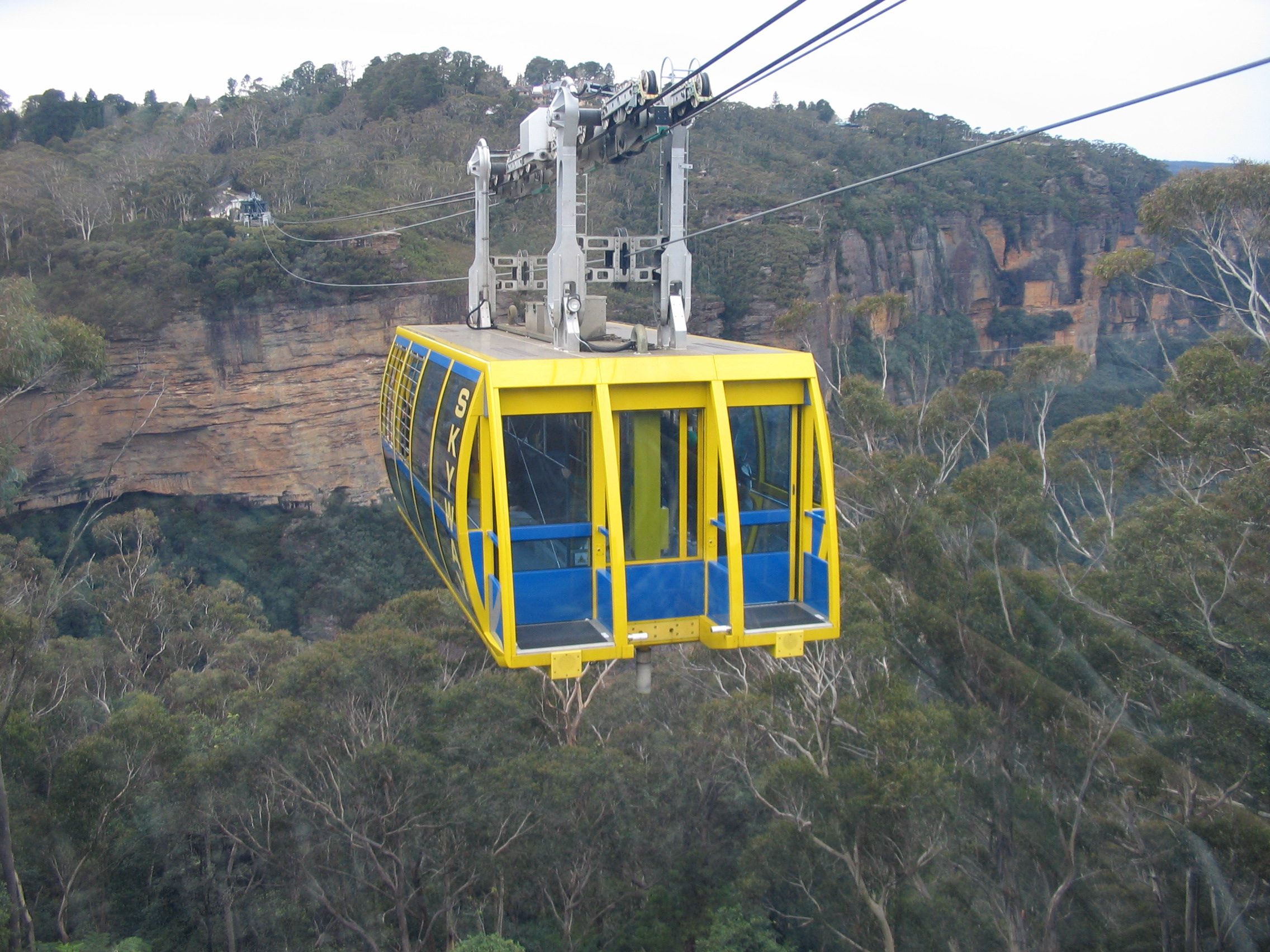
Skyway from the western side.

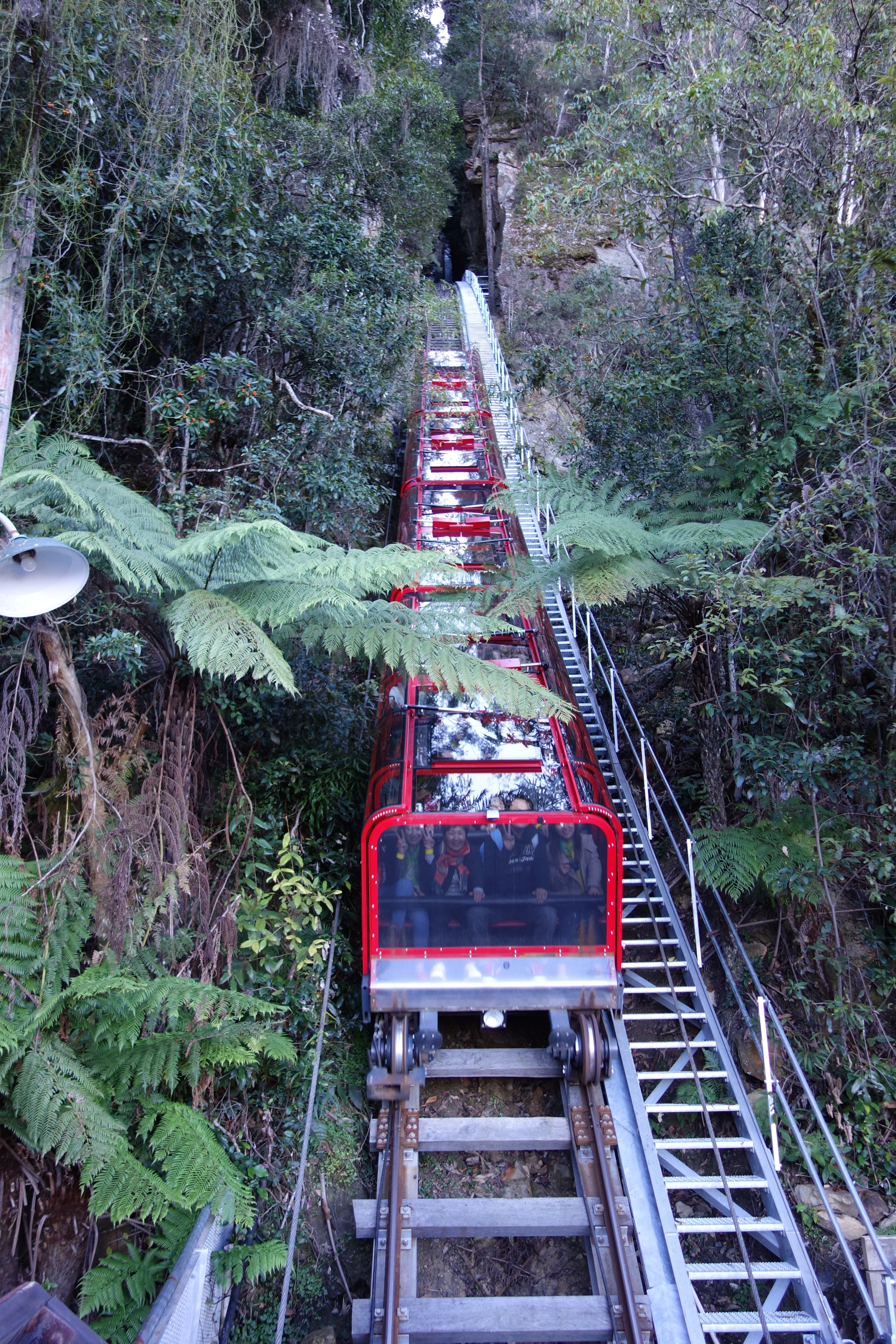
Scenic Railway

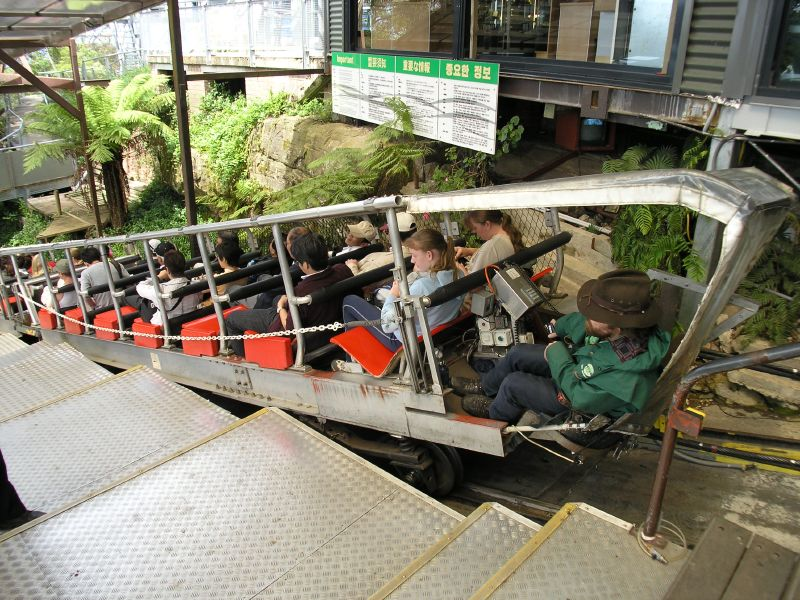
Katoomba scenic railway prior to upgrade (photographed before 2006)

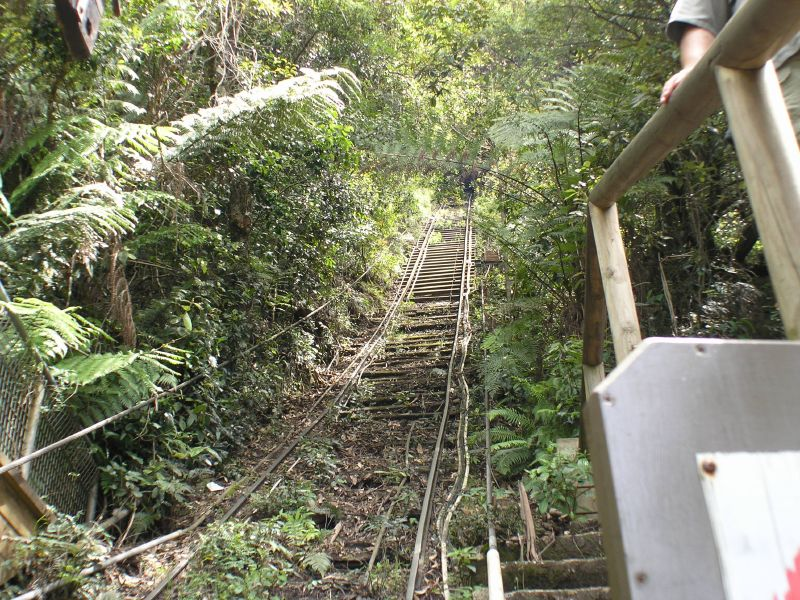
The lowest section of 45-degree angle track

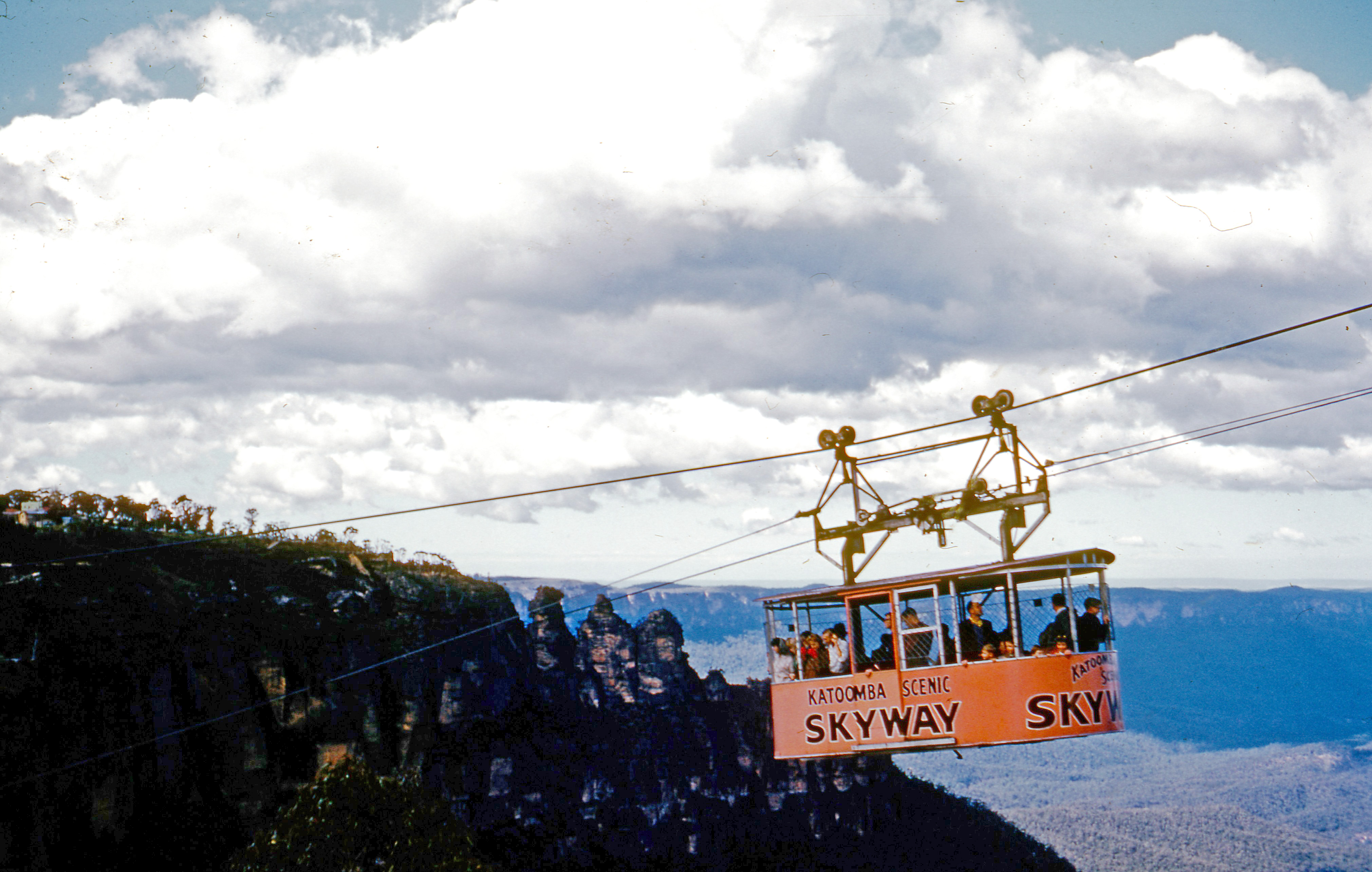
Katoomba Scenic Skyway in 1963

Scenic World is a family-owned tourist attraction located in Katoomba in the Blue Mountains, New South Wales, Australia, about 100 kilometres (62 mi) west of Sydney. Scenic World is home to four attractions, the Scenic Railway, the Scenic Skyway, the Scenic Cableway and Scenic Walkway, a 2.4 km (1.5 mi) elevated boardwalk through ancient rainforest.

== Overview ==
=== Railway ===
The Scenic Railway is an incline railway now used for tourism. The steepest section of track is on an incline of 52 degrees (128% gradient) contained within a total distance of 310 metres (1,020 ft). It was originally constructed for a coal and oil shale mining operation in the Jamison Valley in the 1880s, in order to haul the coal and shale from the valley floor up to the escarpment above. From 1928 to 1945, it carried coal during the week and passengers at weekends. The coal mine was closed in 1945 after which it remained as a tourist attraction. The Scenic Railway was temporarily closed on 13 January 2013 (although the Skyway, Cableway, and Walkway remained open) as construction to upgrade both tracks and carriages began. The work was completed and the railway reopened in April 2013.

The Scenic Railway has been promoted as the world's steepest passenger railway, but it is technically an inclined lift, not a funicular, due to its winch system and lack of a counterbalancing carriage. Among true funiculars, the Stoosbahn in Switzerland, opened in 2017, holds the record for steepest incline. In the broader category of cable cars, the Scenic Railway was surpassed in steepness in 2024 by the new Schilthorn cable car in Switzerland, which has a gradient of 159.4%.

=== Skyway ===
Built in 1958, the Scenic Skyway is another cable-driven conveyance at Scenic World. It travels across the gorge above the Katoomba Falls, 270 metres (886 feet) above the valley floor. The original Scenic Skyway was withdrawn on 4 April 2004 after 587,401 crossings and now sits in the picnic area at Scenic World. It was replaced by a new cabin in December of the same year. The new Skyway was built by Doppelmayr and CWA Constructions, and features a 72-person cabin with sections of liquid crystal glass that turns a raised section of the floor transparent as the ride progresses. In November 2005, a second station on the opposite cliff-face opened, allowing Skyway passengers to disembark and follow bush walking trails to the nearby Echo Point. In November 2017, the latest Scenic Skyway cabin was launched. This Skyway cabin is 30% bigger than its predecessor, offering visitors a more spacious ride with easier boarding, as well as free Wi-Fi.

=== Cableway ===
In 2000, Scenic World installed the Sceniscender, now called Scenic Cableway, a 84-passenger cable car from Doppelmayr that travels between the top and bottom of the escarpment, offering an alternate way of reaching the valley floor. Leaving the Upper Station, the Cableway travels over a 25-metre-high (82 ft) tower on the edge of the cliff, and then travels 510 metres (1,673 feet) to the Lower (Bottom) Station in the Jamison Valley 200 m (656 ft) below.

Like the Railway and Skyway, the Cableway had a replacement of its cabin in 2018, also supplied by Doppelmayr/Garaventa

=== Dining ===
Scenic World operates two food and beverage outlets, namely EATS270 and the Terrace Café.

The former Scenic Revolving Restaurant was renovated and reopened in late 2012 as an eatery. During this time, a decision was made to cease operation of the revolving floor. The floor can still, however, be turned on by request for private functions. Both EATS270 and the Terrace Café feature balcony areas with extensive outdoor seating overlooking the Three Sisters and Jamison Valley.

Scenic World food and beverage outlets are not open in the evenings for general dining, but can be booked for private functions and corporate events.

=== Orphan Rocker ===
In 1984, Scenic World began building a roller coaster known as the Orphan Rocker, named after the nearby Orphan Rock. It was the first roller coaster to be completely designed and manufactured in Australia. The highlight of this ride is meant to be a swooping banked turn that takes riders within metres of the edge of a 200 m (656 ft) cliff. It has in the past been referred to as a "sitdown suspended" coaster, because although it is a conventional sitdown coaster, the trains can tilt from side to side, like a suspended coaster, giving it its name. It was originally planned as a scenic monorail ride, but it soon evolved into a roller-coaster ride. The roller coaster has never publicly opened due to demands for redevelopment elsewhere onsite.

In 1999, CEO Phillip Hammon cited 'safety issues' as the reason for what was by then a 15-year delay. As late as 2006, Scenic World's team remained adamant that the Orphan Rocker would open.

Portions of the coaster's track have been removed as of 2017. The roller coaster was never opened to the public.

Despite its mysterious nature, evidence has emerged recently of the true course of events that led to the abandonment of the Orphan Rocker, as well as video recordings of individuals riding. According to Hammon's daughter, Anthea, the ride was perfectly safe, and that she had ridden it 'hundreds of times'. Therefore, the most common explanation posed to the abandonment of the ride is the fact that the local residents were deeply disturbed by a large, noisy roller coaster rushing through the Blue Mountains National Park. As such, local opposition stifled the coaster's opening, resulting in a fundamental reevaluation by Hammon over what he desired the park to be. However, recent archival footage has emerged of Garry Who, presenter of the TV show, Just For The Record, riding the yet unopened coaster, and promising it would be open within the near future.

== See also ==
- List of funicular railways
