= Shipley Plateau =

Place in the Blue Mountains, Australia

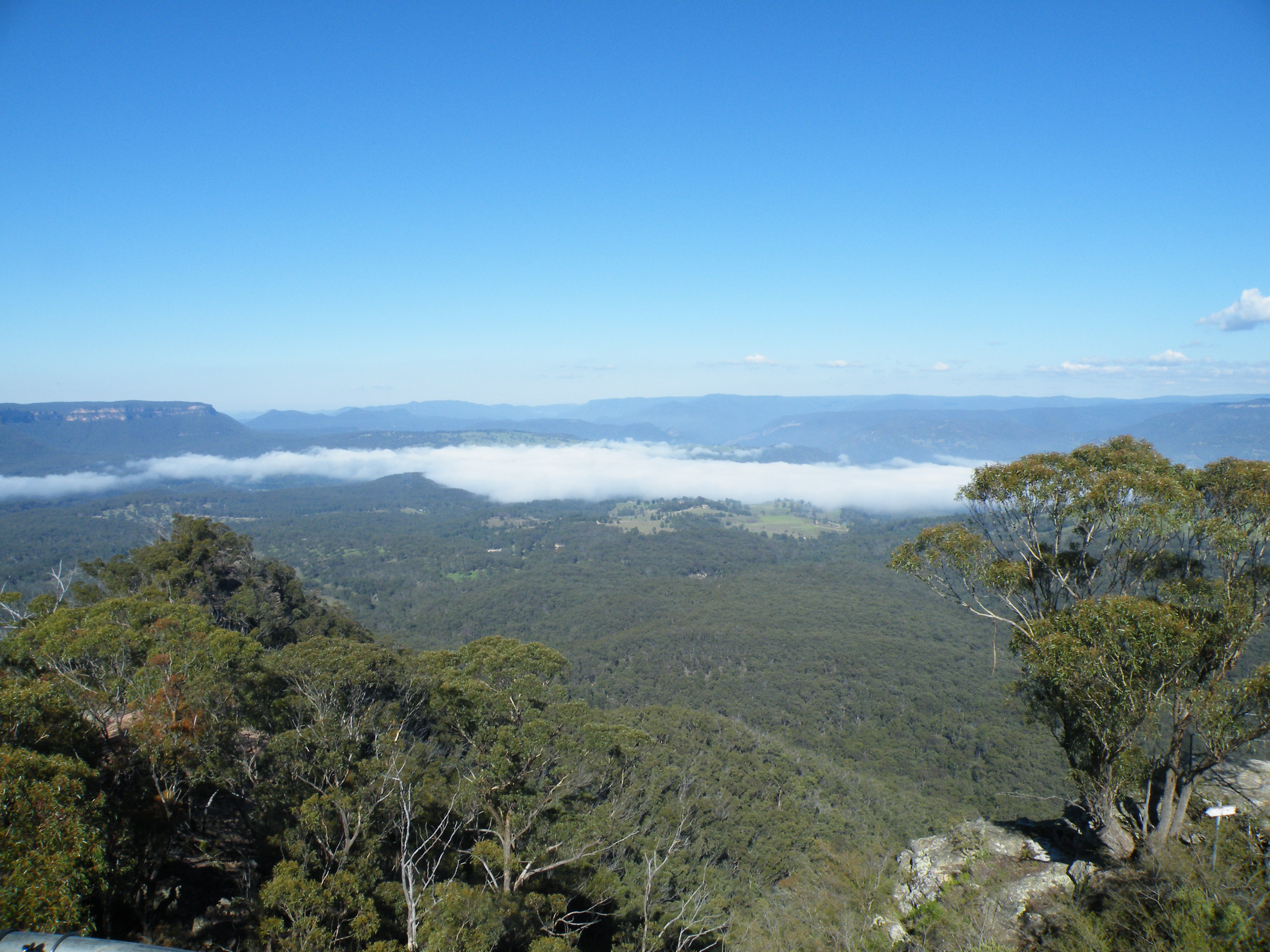

Shipley Plateau is located south of Blackheath, New South Wales in the Blue Mountains of New South Wales, Australia. Faced with sandstone escarpments, the plateau is accessible by road and some of the land area is planted with fruit orchards. The Hargraves Lookout on its south easterly limit provides an excellent view of the Megalong Valley.

Logan Brae Apple Orchard is the only apple orchard left operating on the plateau.
