= Katoomba Airfield =

Airfield in Medlow Bath, New South Wales, Australia

- IATA: none; ICAO: YKAT

Summary
- Airport type: Private
- Location: Medlow Bath, NSW, Australia
- Time zone: AEST (+10:00)
  - Summer (DST): AEDT (+11:00)
- Elevation AMSL: 3,280 ft / 999 m
- Coordinates: 33°40′06″S 150°19′24″E

Map
- Location in New South Wales

Runways
Direction	Length		Surface
Direction	ft	m	Surface
06/24	3,116	950	Unsealed

Katoomba Airfield (ICAO: YKAT) is an Australian airfield located in the town of Medlow Bath, New South Wales. It is 11.5 kilometres (7.1 mi) by road from the central business district of the nearby city of Katoomba, after which it is named. It is a country airfield which has seen minimal use.

The airfield is currently closed to airplanes and helicopters. The site remains available for use by emergency services. It is Crown Land.

== History ==
Katoomba Airfield has a long history dating back to the Australian Army in 1925, when a survey of the surrounding Blue Mountains region identified land suitable for an airport site. In 1959 the Blue Mountains National Park was formally gazetted, meaning future development of the now-protected site would require special government approval.

In the mid 1960s, land was excised for the airfield, with the NSW National Parks and Wildlife Service agreeing to exclude the airfield from land to be added to the National Park at that time, provided that the land was added to it upon the expiry of the lease in 1988. The then Lands Department agreed to this process. This led the way for the site to be developed and officially opened in 1969 by Harold Coates MP (then State Member for Blue Mountains) and Ern Lesslie (then Mayor of Blue Mountains Council)

From its opening in 1969 the airfield provided an air "Safety Ramp" for general aviation, being the only fixed aircraft landing area between Sydney and Central West NSW. In 2008 the commercial lease expired and the Government of NSW proposed the sale of airfield land; however, Blue Mountains City Council (BMCC) were opposed to the sale and reaffirmed its position that the land should be part of Blue Mountains National Park. An agreement was eventually reached and the land was then occupied on monthly arrangement until 2017. Minimal commercial activities occurred in this time and, as such, the airfield began to fall into disrepair.

In 2016 Katoomba Airfield's licensee, flying instructor Rod Hay, was killed in a single-engine plane crash in nearby scrub at the airfield. In September 2017, following this accident, the Department of Primary Industry called for an Expression of Interest from parties interested to license the site. Blackbird Helicopters was granted the licence from 1 February 2018.

There was community concern about the proposal. A 56-day public submissions period for the proposed development ended on 4 August 2019, gaining over 1500 submissions, and a petition of 12,200 signatures opposing the development was presented to NSW Parliament by local MP Trish Doyle. On 27 August 2019, Blue Mountains City Council voted to oppose the development in its submission to the Department of Primary Industry.

On 13 January 2020, the Department of Planning, Industry and the Environment rejected the lease application due to overwhelming community opposition.

== Operations ==
Katoomba currently does not have any companies based at the airfield; however, if required for emergency services, its use to support efforts such as a staging area for firefighting support cannot be refused.

== Radio procedures ==
Katoomba has no control centre and pilots communicate over a Common Traffic Advisory Frequency.
