= Kedumba River =

Kedumba Kedumba Creek (Part), Katoomba Creek (Part)
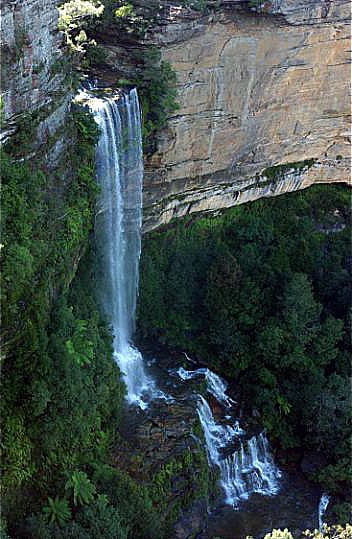
- Kedumba River descending into the Jamison Valley over the Katoomba Falls, viewed from Scenic World, Katoomba, 2013.

- Location of the Keduma River mouth in Lake Burragorang, New South Wales

Location
- Country: Australia
- State: New South Wales
- Region: Sydney Basin (IBRA), Blue Mountains, Macarthur
- LGAs: Blue Mountains, Wollondilly

Physical characteristics
- Source: Blue Mountains
  - location: Walford Park, Katoomba, Blue Mountains (New South Wales)
  - coordinates: 33°42′54″S 150°18′23″E
  - elevation: 556 m (1,824 ft)
- Mouth: confluence with the Coxs River to form Lake Burragorang
  - location: Policeman Point, Warragamba
  - coordinates: 33°51′21″S 150°20′27″E
  - elevation: 120 m (390 ft)
- Length: 20 km (12 mi)

Basin features
- River system: Hawkesbury-Nepean catchment
- Waterfalls: Katoomba Cascades, Katoomba Falls
- National park: Blue Mountains National Park

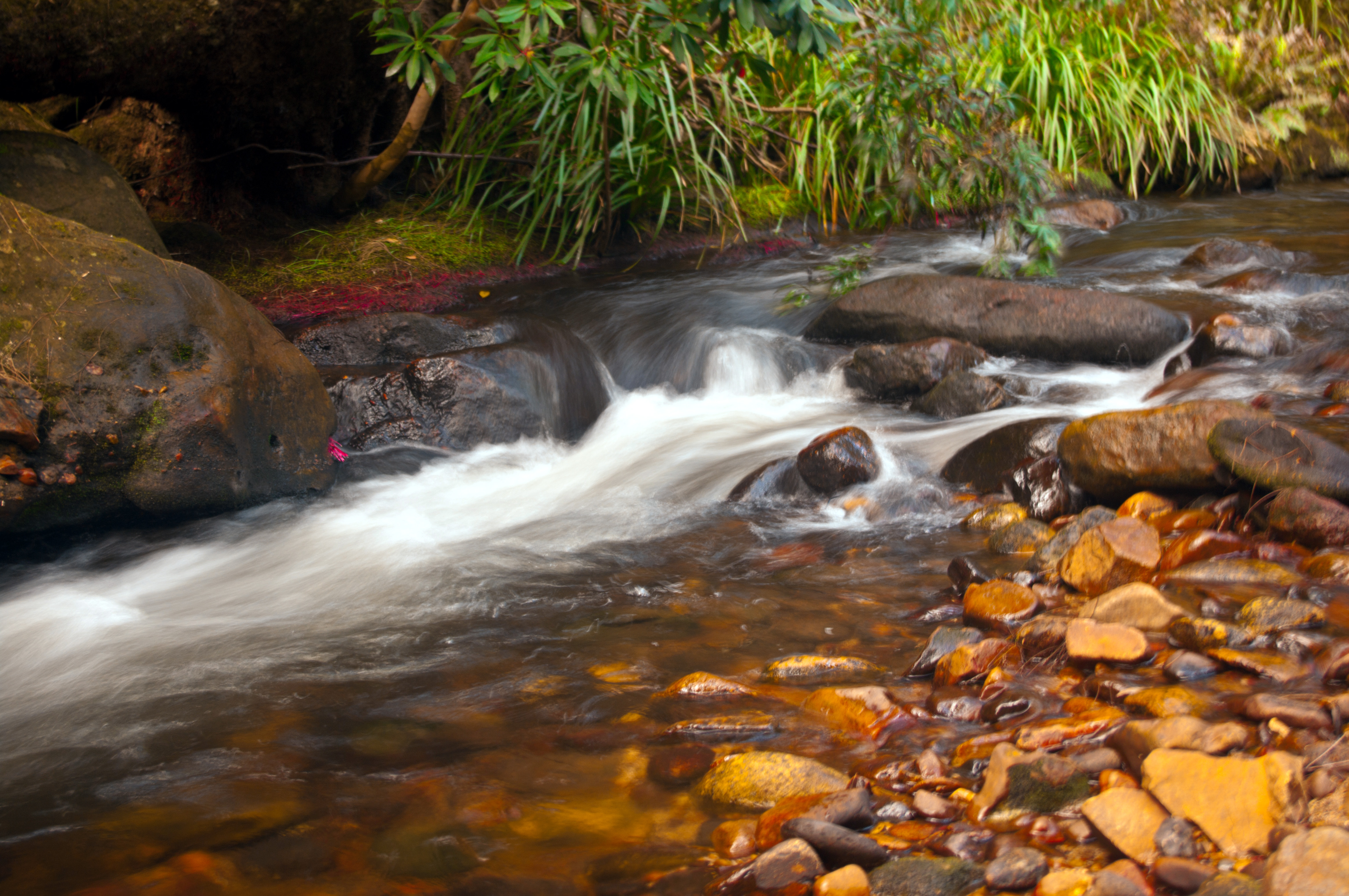
Rapids on the Kedumba River

The Kedumba River is a perennial river forming part of the Hawkesbury-Nepean catchment located in the Blue Mountains and Macarthur regions of New South Wales, Australia.

== Course and features ==
The Kedumba Creek rises on the eastern side of Walford Park, Katoomba and flows generally south over the Katoomba Cascades, Katoomba Falls, and off the Blue Mountains Range, becoming the Kedumba River below the Three Sisters flowing through the Jamison and Kedumba valleys within the Blue Mountains National Park, before reaching its confluence with the Coxs River within Lake Burragorang. The river descends 178 metres (584 ft) over its 20-kilometre (12 mi) course.

== See also ==
- Gandangara people
- List of rivers of Australia
- List of rivers of New South Wales (A–K)
- Rivers of New South Wales
