= Wild Dog Mountains =

Mountains in New South Wales, Australia

The Wild Dog Mountains are a rugged area of 104 km^{2} of the Blue Mountains of New South Wales. The mountains are located in the Blue Mountains National Park

The name was assigned in 2004
