= Mount Solitary =

Mountain in New South Wales, Australia

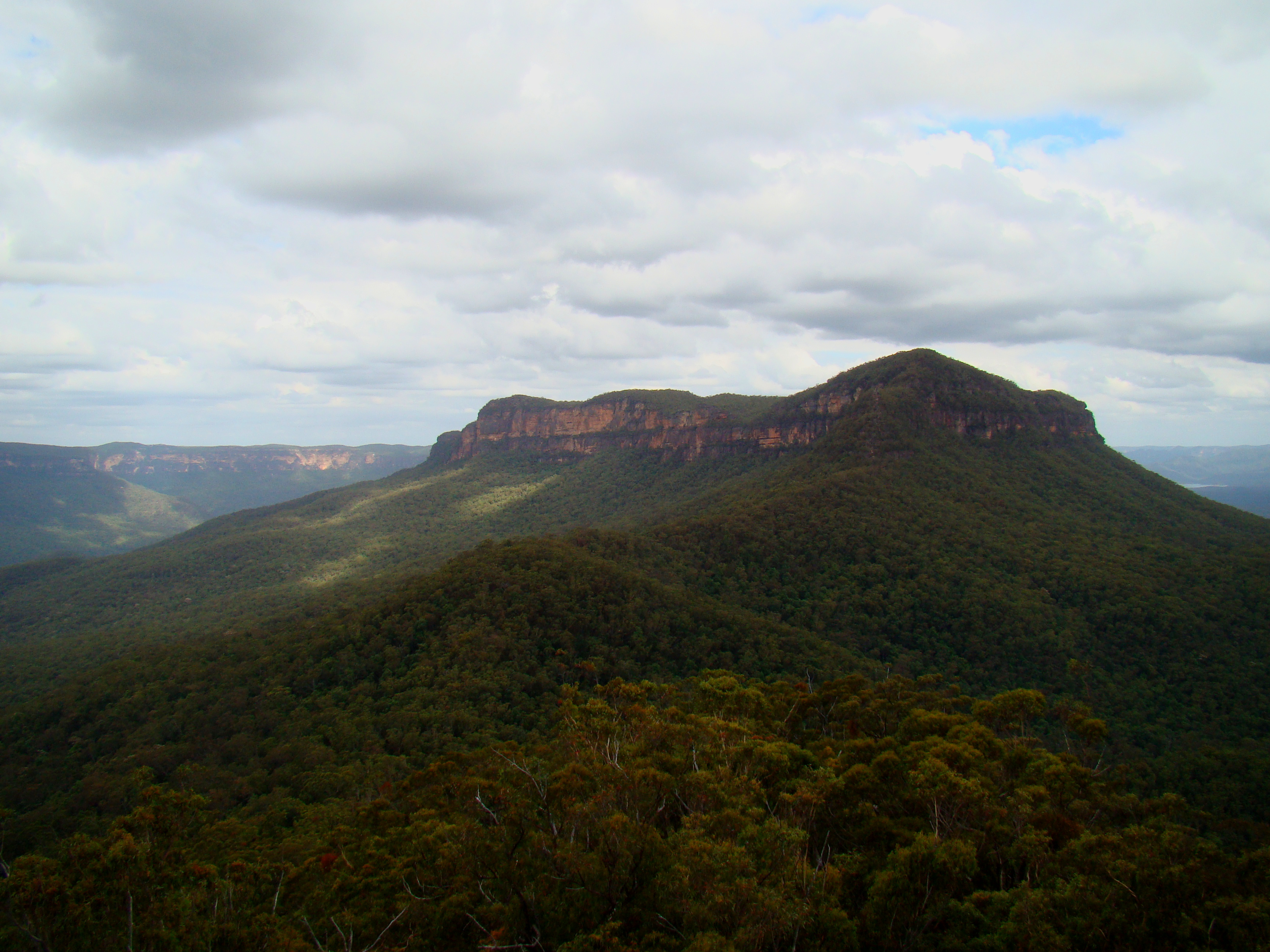
- Mount Solitary as seen from the Ruined Castle

Highest point
- Elevation: 950 m (3,120 ft) approx
- Coordinates: 33°47′S 150°19′E

Naming
- Native name: Korowal

Geography
- Location within New South Wales
- Location: Blue Mountains region, New South Wales, Australia
- Parent range: Blue Mountains

Mount Solitary, a mountain that is part of the Blue Mountains Range, a spur off the Great Dividing Range, is situated within the Blue Mountains National Park, New South Wales, Australia. Mount Solitary is located approximately 100 kilometres (62 mi) west of Sydney, and a few kilometres south of Katoomba, the main town in the Blue Mountains.

The local indigenous people called the mountain Korowal, meaning 'the strong one'. The origin of the contemporary name is obscure, but it may be based on the fact that Mount Solitary is the only mountain in the Jamison Valley.

== Description ==
Mount Solitary is located in the middle of the Jamison Valley, one of the main valleys of the Blue Mountains region, immediately south of Katoomba. It is a long, low mountain of sandstone, stretching across the valley from west to east. Its top is approximately 5 kilometres (3.1 mi) long; counting its lower slopes, it would be approximately 10 kilometres (6.2 mi) long. It is approximately 950 metres (3,120 ft) above sea level at its highest point. It is nearly covered in eucalyptus forest, with a small group of pine trees at the western end. Small and rugged pockets of semi-rainforest are found along its slopes, particularly where water gathers in gullies. Snow is known to fall occasionally on the high points during winter.

== Bushwalking ==
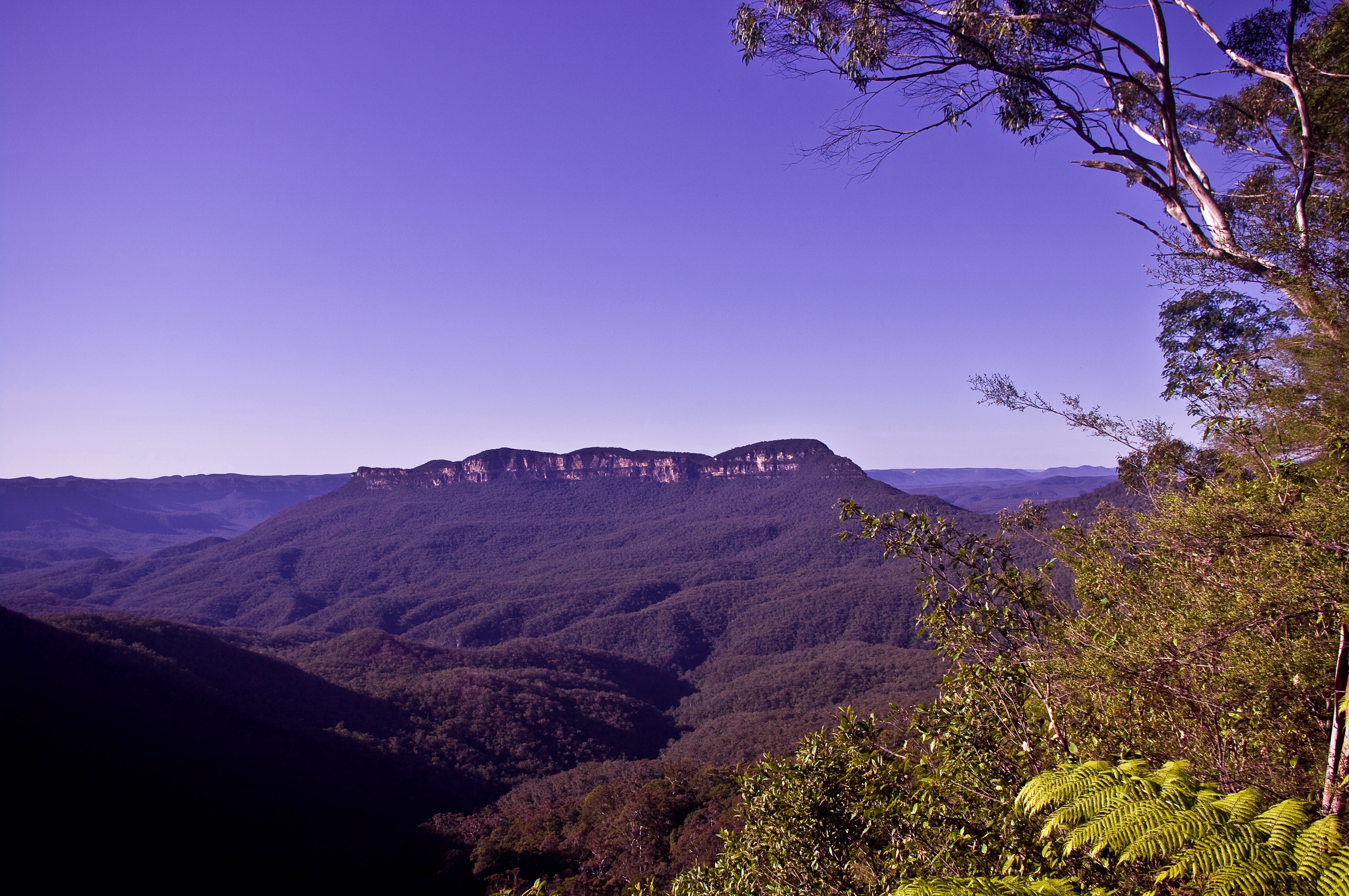
Mount Solitary is a popular spot for bushwalking and is reached via the Federal Pass track that begins at the Golden Stairs, near Katoomba, and heads south-east towards the lower slopes of Mount Solitary.

Along the way is the Ruined Castle, a rock formation on a ridge above the track, and the sealed opening of an old coal mine. In this area there's a large clearing which was once home to the mining community and is now used by campers. On the western end of the mountain is Chinamans Gully with a large rock shelter. There are expansive views to the south from the southern side of the mountain. From here the track descends to the Kedumba River, and then up to Kings Tableland, south of Wentworth Falls.

In December 2006, a bush walker, 17-year-old David Iredale, lost the track while on the Katoomba to Wentworth Falls trek with friends. He made calls to "000" on his mobile phone, but was repeatedly rebuffed by emergency operators because he could not provide a street address to which an ambulance could be dispatched. After his seventh and final call, a search and rescue operation was mounted. His body was found eight days later, approximately 200 metres (660 ft) north of the track, somewhere above the Kedumba River.

In July 2009, a British tourist named Jamie Neale got lost on his way to Mount Solitary. He had walked as far as the Ruined Castle after leaving Katoomba, he went on to Mount Solitary reaching the summit. But on return he got lost coming down Korowal knife edge. He was lost in the bush for twelve days before finally finding some campers in the vicinity of Narrow Neck Plateau. Later, it was reported that the agent Sean Anderson had taken Neale on as a client, after the story had received worldwide attention. One rumour was that the programme Sixty Minutes, on Channel Nine, had paid Neale $50,000 for his story.

== See also ==
Media related to Mount Solitary at Wikimedia Commons

- List of mountains in New South Wales
- List of Blue Mountains subjects
