= Blue Mountains National Park =

National park in Australia

- IUCN category II (national park)
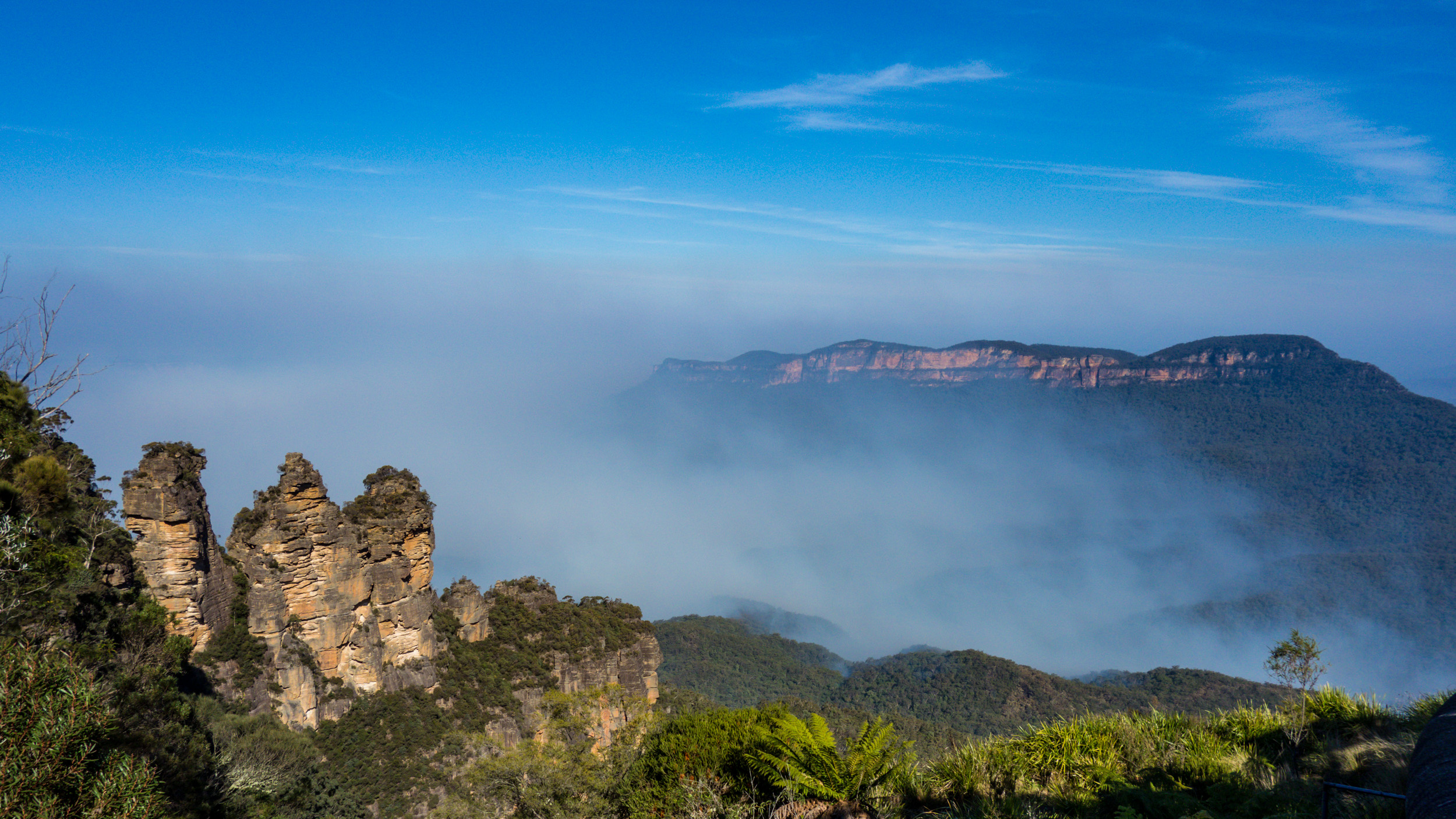
- View of the "Three Sisters", Jamison Valley, and Mount Solitary from Echo Point. (Note: Midday view from Echo Point observatory in Katoomba, New South Wales, looking south towards the "Three Sisters" (left foreground), Jamison Valley (middleground), and Mount Solitary (background). A layer of fog, a common climatic feature of the Blue Mountains, covers the majority of Jamison Valley from view. The distance between Echo Point and Mount Solitary is 5 kilometres (3.1 miles).)

- Location within New South Wales
- Location: New South Wales
- Nearest city: Katoomba
- Coordinates: 33.62°S 150.46°E
- Area: 2,679.54 km^{2} (1,034.58 sq mi)
- Established: September 1959
- Visitors: 8438671 (in 2018)
- Governing body: NSW National Parks & Wildlife Service
- Website: http://www.nationalparks.nsw.gov.au/Blue-Mountains-National-Park

The Blue Mountains National Park is a protected national park in the Blue Mountains region of New South Wales, in eastern Australia. The 267,954-hectare (662,130-acre) national park is situated approximately 80 kilometres (50 mi) west of the Sydney CBD, and the park boundary is quite irregular as it is broken up by roads, urban areas and areas of private property. Despite the name mountains, the area is an uplifted plateau, dissected by a number of larger rivers. The highest point in the park is Mount Werong at 1,215 metres (3,986 ft) above sea level; while the low point is on the Nepean River at 20 metres (66 ft) above sea level as it leaves the park.

The national park is one of the eight protected areas that, in 2000, was inscribed to form part of the UNESCO World Heritage–listed Greater Blue Mountains Area. The Greater Blue Mountains was one of 15 World Heritage places included in the National Heritage List on 21 May 2007. The Blue Mountains National Park is the most central of the eight protected areas within the World Heritage Site and it forms part of the Great Dividing Range. The park is also listed on the Australian Heritage Register and the overall complex of Blue Mountains regional walking tracks is listed on the State Heritage Register.

== History ==
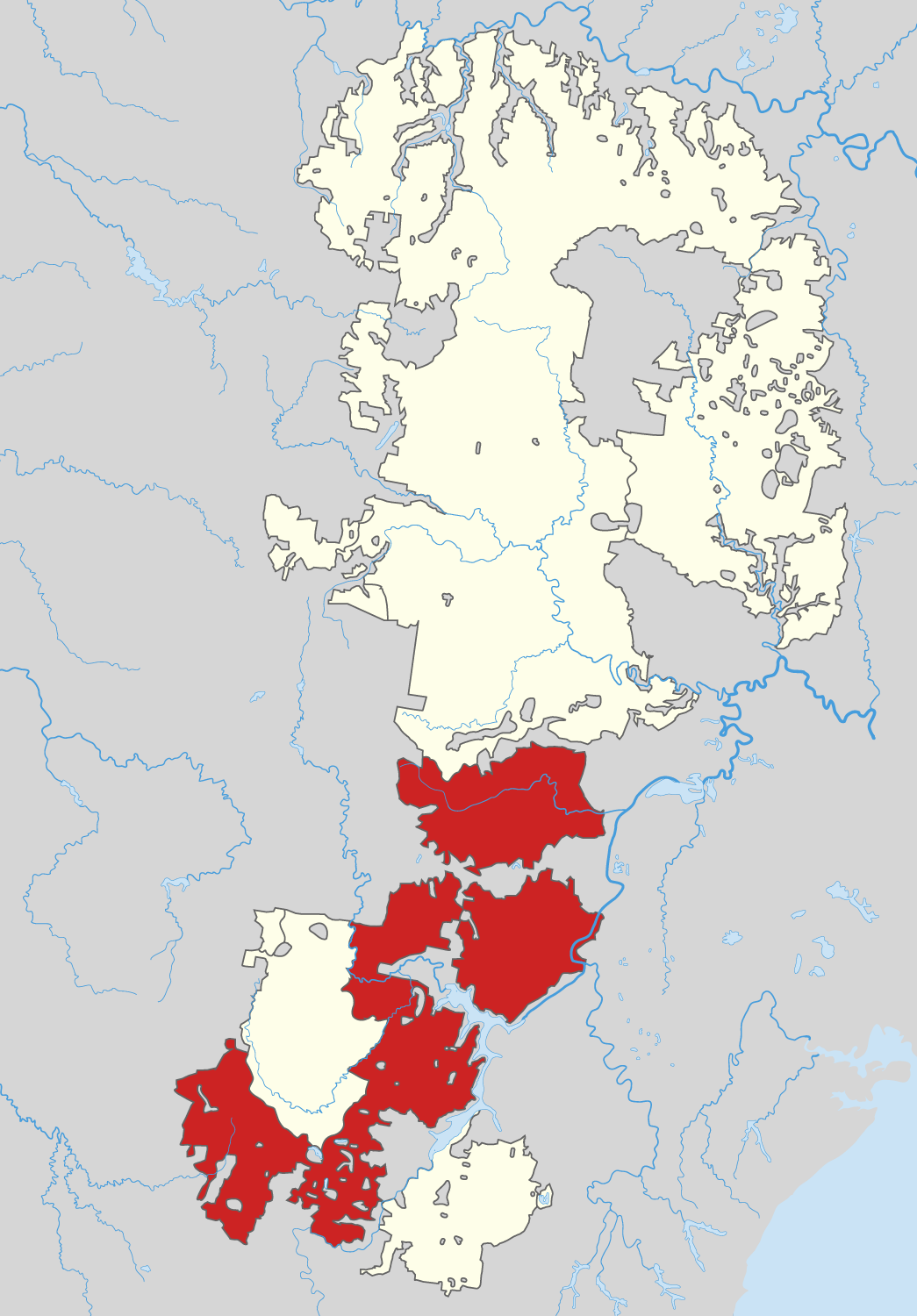
The Blue Mountains National Park, shaded in red, as part of the larger Greater Blue Mountains World Heritage Area.

The genesis of the national park was a proposal by early conservationist Myles Dunphy for a Greater Blue Mountains National Park in 1932. This included large areas of what are today the Blue Mountains National Park, and the Wollemi, Kanangra-Boyd, Nattai, Gardens of Stone, and Thirlmere Lakes, along with other smaller nature reserves; all managed by the NSW National Parks & Wildlife Service. In September 1959 the Blue Mountains National Park was gazetted covering 63,000 hectares (160,000 acres). In 2000 it was included as part of the Greater Blue Mountains World Heritage Area. In 1999, 37 walking tracks were added to the State Heritage Register, extending from Glenbrook and the Nepean River in the east; to Mount Tomah in the north; to Wolgan Valley and Newnes in the northwest; to Jenolan Caves and Oberon in the west; and in the south, numerous walks leading down the plateau from Katoomba, Leura and Wentworth Falls.

== Geography ==
The Blue Mountains National Park lies on the eastern side of the Great Dividing Range. The plateau slopes gently down from west to east from a height of around 1,100 metres (3,600 ft) above sea level near Mount Victoria to less than 200 metres (660 ft) above sea level around Glenbrook. There are four major rivers that have most of their catchment inside the park: the Wollangambe River in the north, the Grose River in the centre, and the Coxs and Wollondilly rivers in the south. The latter two flow into Lake Burragorang, which is located just outside the park and is the site of Warragamba Dam, the major source of drinking water for Sydney. A small section of the Nepean River passes through the park. All of the major rivers flow from west to east.

== Geology ==
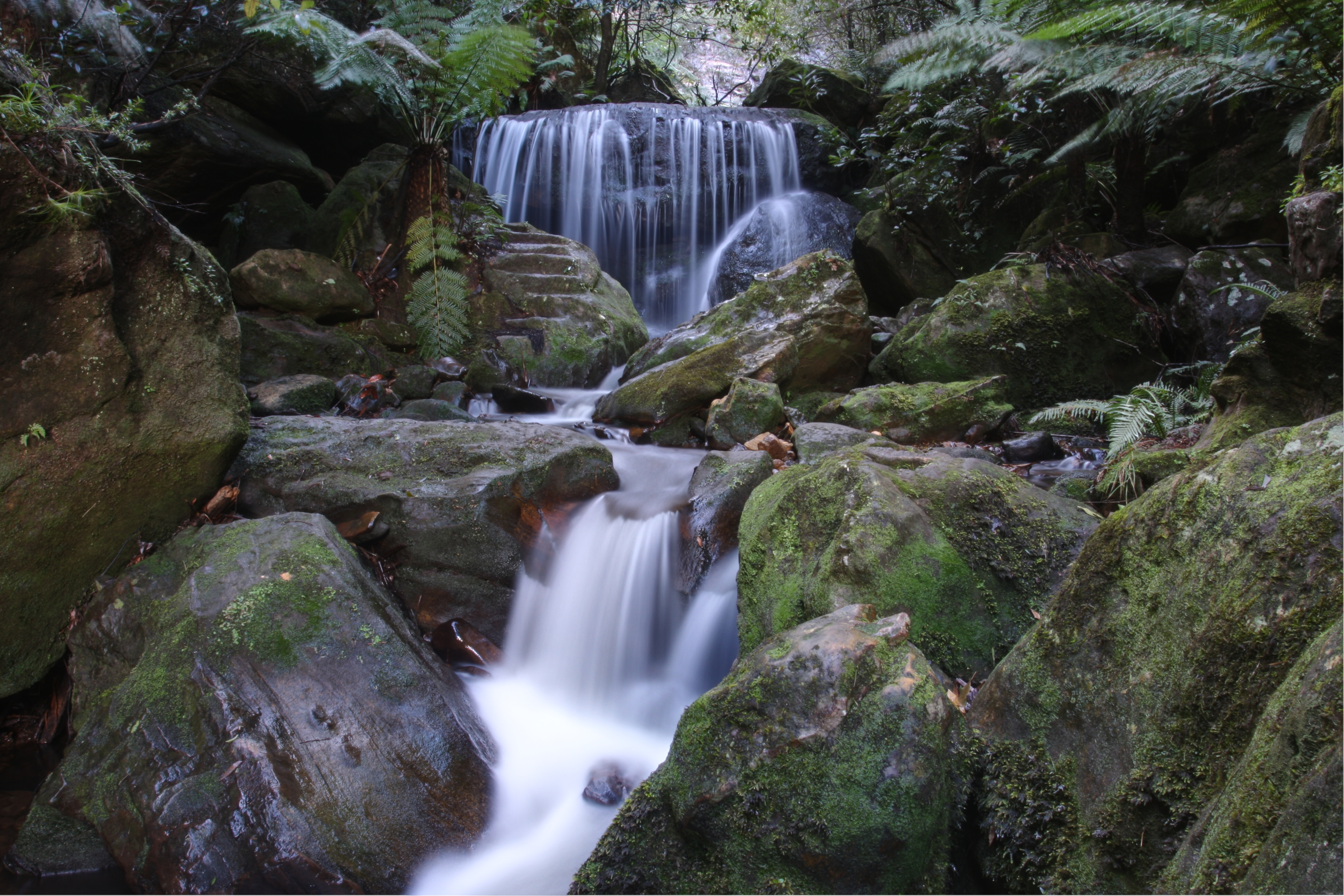
A small waterfall at Leura. Rainforest plants here include the southern sassafras and the black olive berry, both relicts from the age of Gondwana.

Structurally, the Blue Mountains are part of the greater Sydney Basin. The Sydney Basin consists of layers of sedimentary rocks laid down over the past 300 million years. The Blue Mountains and Great Dividing Range were formed about 50 million years ago, when the area was uplifted. More recently, volcanic flows covered large areas of the mountains in basalt. These have largely worn away, leaving only occasional outcrops on the high peaks.

== Biodiversity ==
The park contains a small range of eucalypt species across a variety of habitats including wet and dry Sclerophyll, Mallee, swamps, wetlands and grasslands. Some species are of significance to our understanding of plant evolution including the Wollemi Pine, of which fewer than 100 trees are known. Notable plant families include Myrtaceae, Fabaceae and Proteaceae including 114 endemic and 177 threatened species.

This range of habitats supports a rich variety of fauna, including a third of Australia's bird species, and numerous mammals, reptiles and frogs. Notable endangered and endemic species include the regent honeyeater, Broad-headed snake and the Blue Mountains water skink.

== Tourism ==
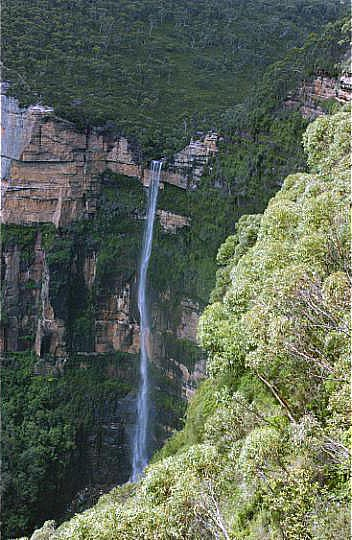
Bridal Veil Falls, at Govetts Leap, Blackheath.

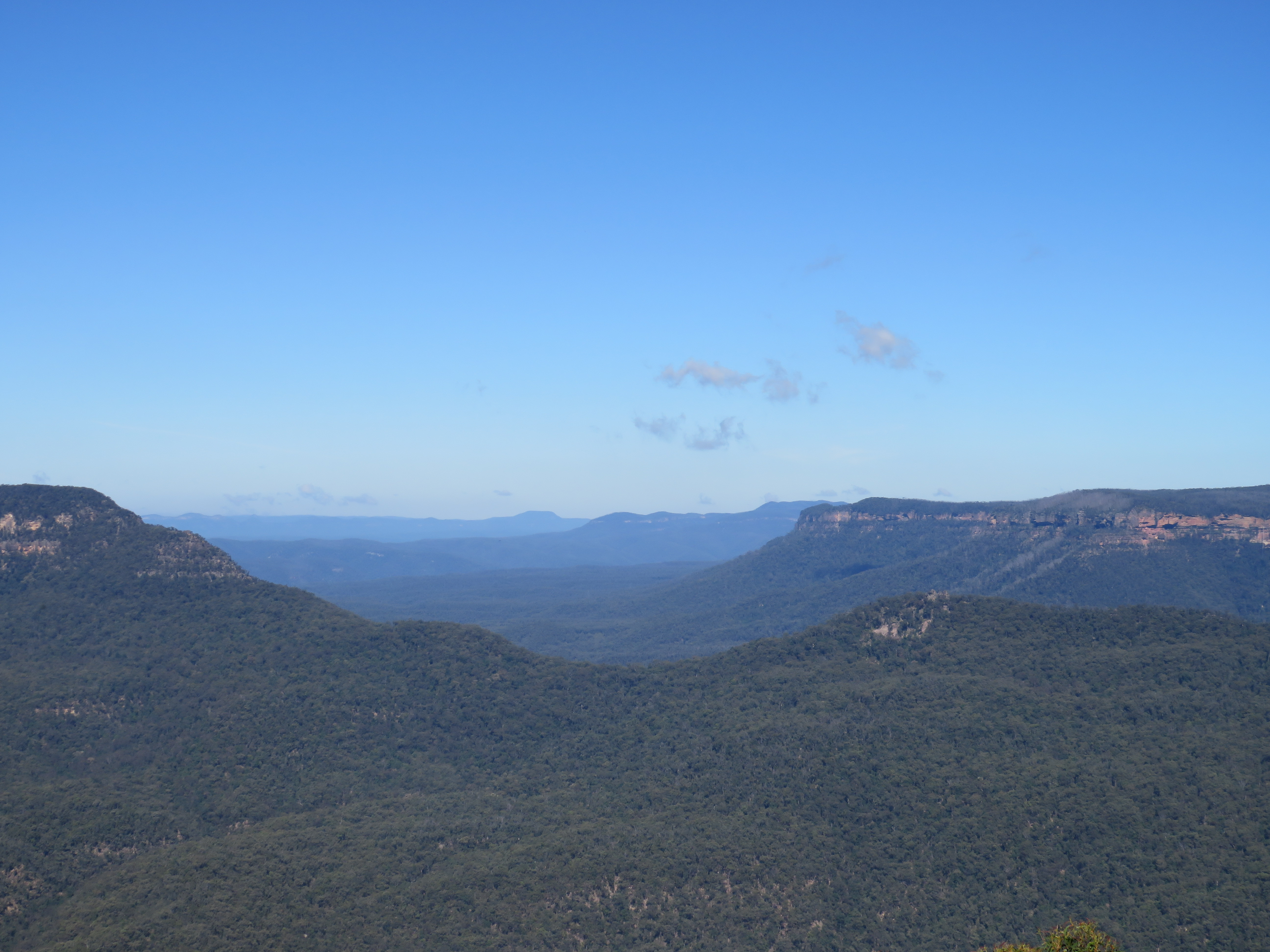
Mountain ranges at Three Sisters Walk Lookout.

The Blue Mountains National Park is the most visited National Park in NSW with more than half of domestic visitors originating from Sydney and one of the easiest locations to spot wild kangaroos in Sydney. The majority of tourists to the Blue Mountains see the national park from one of the many lookouts between Wentworth Falls and Blackheath, and many of these never actually set foot in the park. Activities for the visitor include short walks to lookouts above cliffs and waterfalls, overnight and longer walks to more remote areas of the park and more extreme sports such as canyoning, abseiling, rock climbing and mountain biking. A number of sightseeing and adventure tour companies can assist visitors in safely experiencing these activities. It is also home to the world's steepest railway, the Katoomba Scenic Railway.

The national park is renowned for the Three Sisters rock formation. Both north and south of Blackheath, the cliffs are the most spectacular as the rock faces are several hundreds metres tall. Visitor numbers have increased to 5.2 million in 2016 from 3.6 million in 2008.

== Southern Blue Mountains ==
The Blue Labyrinth is a forested eroded plateau directly south of the Great Western Highway, stretching from Wentworth Falls to Glenbrook, stretching from Kings Tableland in the west to Warragamba Dam and the Nepean River in the east, and the Burragorang Valley to the south.

The national park extends south as far as the Wollondilly River, west of Mittagong, New South Wales. This area was greatly affected by the construction of Warragamba Dam from 1948 to 1960. This required the flooding of the Burragorang Valley, which created Lake Burragorang and in the process cut the southern part of the Blue Mountains off from areas to the east, for example Camden, Picton and Bargo. Properties and homesteads in the southern part of the mountains were forced to close down, leaving many derelict homes and ruins. These included Bran Jan House and Kowmung House on Scotts Main Range, as well as Twin Peaks, south of Yerranderie.

An exclusion zone of approximately three kilometres was created around Lake Burragorang to protect Sydney's water supply, but a through-track was allowed from Yerranderie to Balloon Pass, then further east, for the benefit of bushwalkers. This pass was later incorporated into the long-distance Katoomba to Mittagong Trail.

== See also ==
- Blue Mountains (New South Wales)
- Protected areas of New South Wales
- Katoomba Scenic World
