= Jamison Valley =

Natural valley in New South Wales, Australia

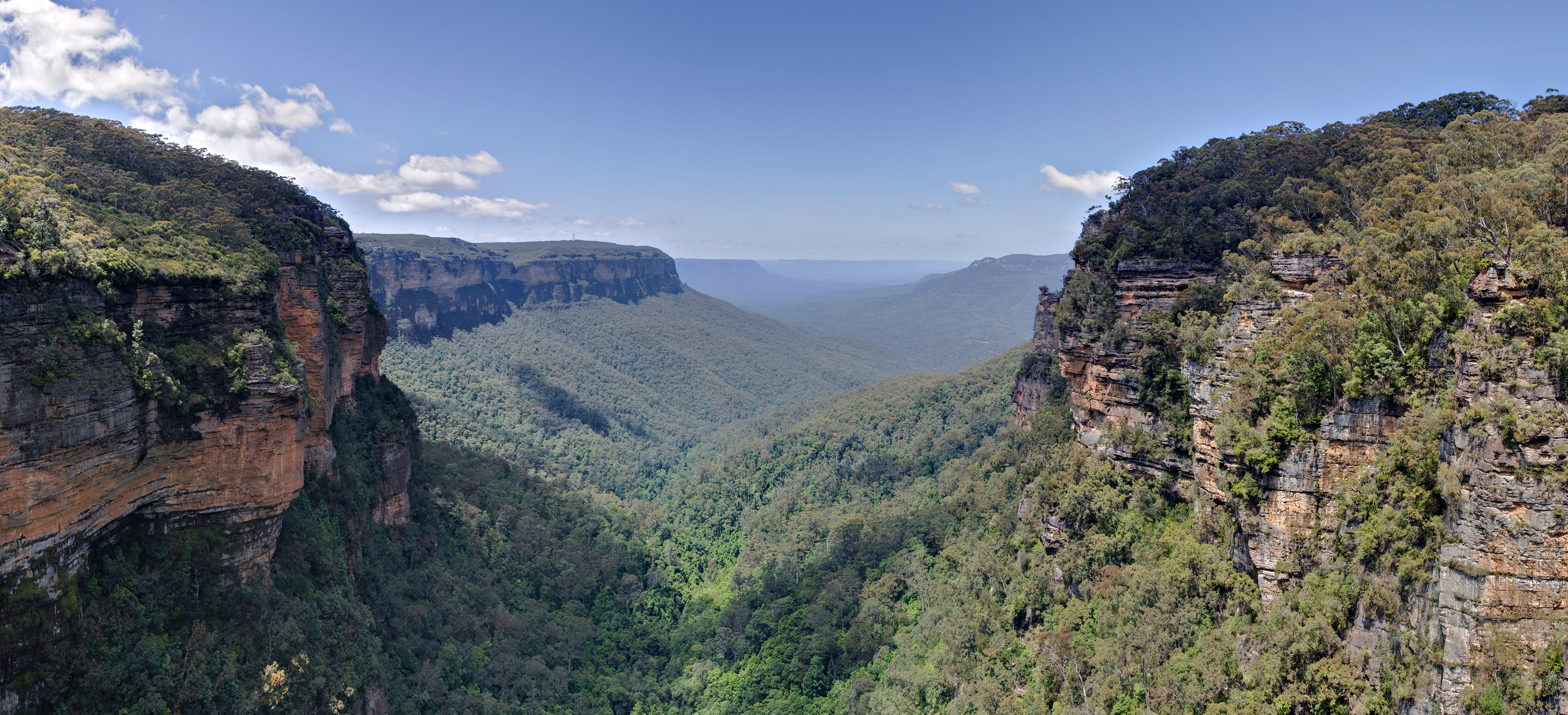
- View of the Jamison Valley from Wentworth Falls
- Length: 4 kilometres (2.5 mi)
- Width: 10 kilometres (6.2 mi)
- Depth: 400 metres (1,300 ft)

Geology
- Age: Triassic

Geography
- Location: Blue Mountains, New South Wales, Australia
- Population centers: Katoomba
- Coordinates: 33°45′30″S 150°20′02″E
- Traversed by: Sublime Point Trail
- Rivers: Jamison Creek; Kedumba River
- Interactive map of Jamison Valley

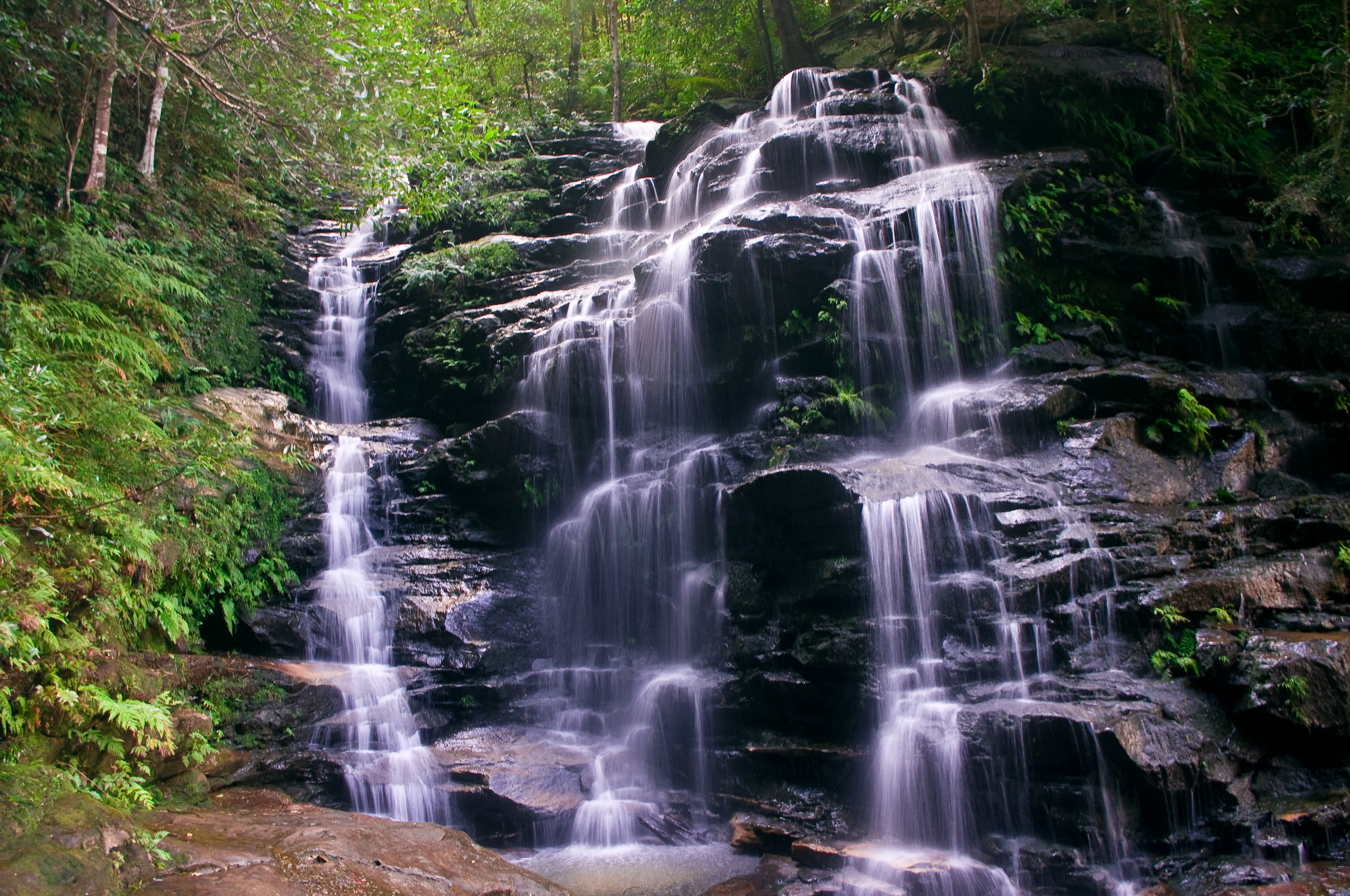
A view of Sylvia Falls – Valley of the Waters, Blue Mountains NP.

The Jamison Valley forms part of the Coxs River canyon system in the Blue Mountains of New South Wales, Australia. It is situated approximately 100 kilometres west of Sydney, capital of New South Wales, and a few kilometres south of Katoomba, the main town in the Blue Mountains.

== History ==
=== Indigenous history ===
The traditional inhabitants of the land in what is now known as the Jamison Valley are the Aboriginal Gundungurra people who are estimated to have lived in the region for 40,000 years, stretching south towards the Burragorang Valley, north of Goulburn.

=== European history ===
The Jamison Valley was named by Governor Lachlan Macquarie in honour of Sir John Jamison (1776–1844), a prominent landowner and physician who visited the Blue Mountains with the governor in 1815.

Later, as local towns were beginning to develop, the British naturalist Charles Darwin toured the area. He stayed at the Weatherboard Inn in Wentworth Falls in 1836, and undertook a walk along Jamison Creek to the escarpment of the Jamison Valley, where he was impressed by the views. His route is now commemorated as Darwin's Walk, starting in Wilson Park, Wentworth Falls, and following Jamison Creek to the escarpment.

Coal mining in the valley was started around 1872 by John Britty North, with large-scale infrastructure (Katoomba Scenic Railway) used to overcome the terrain.

== Geology ==
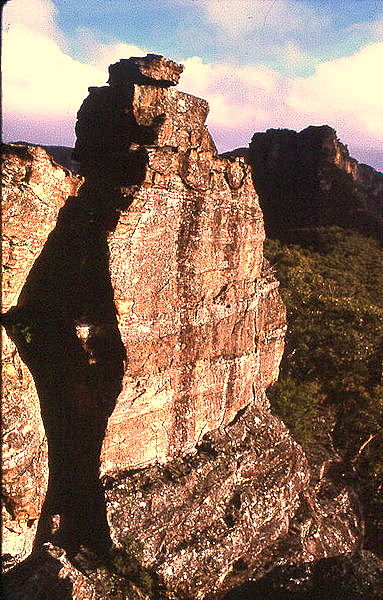
The Ruined Castle, a popular destination for bushwalkers

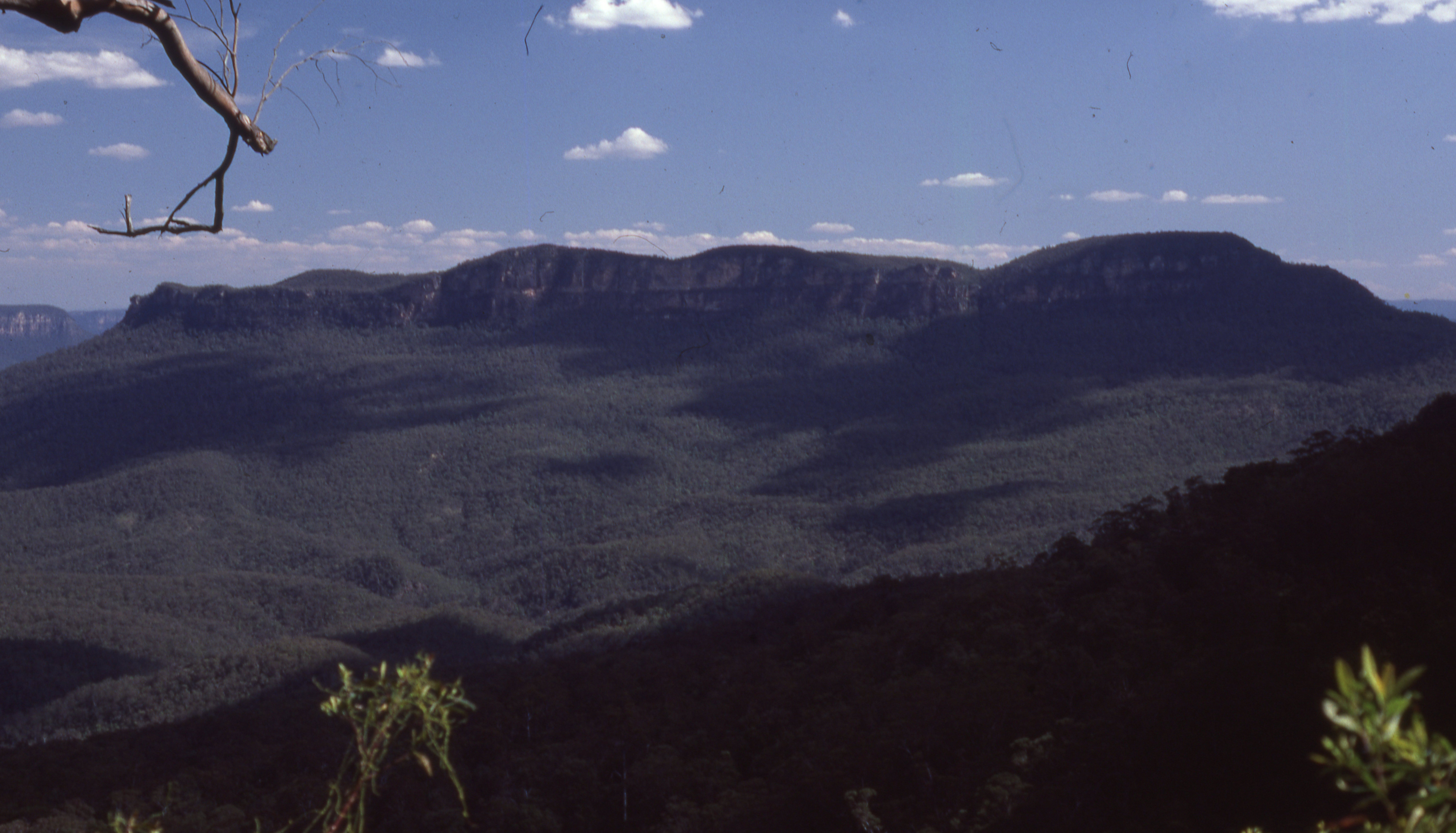
A view of Mount Solitary from the floor of the Jamison Valley

The Jamison Valley stretches north–south from just outside Katoomba to the Mount Solitary ridge; in this direction it is approximately 4 kilometres (2.5 mi) long. From west to east, it stretches from Narrow Neck Plateau to Kings Tableland, making it approximately 10 kilometres (6.2 mi) wide. Like the entire Sydney and Blue Mountains region, the valley is a sandstone area, characterised by steep sandstone cliffs. Deeper into the soil there is a layer of shale, which is softer than the sandstone. As this layer of shale was eroded by the watercourses, it collapsed and brought the sandstone down with it, creating the characteristic sandstone valleys and canyons of the Blue Mountains, of which the Jamison Valley is one.

The only mountain in the valley is Mount Solitary, which sprawls across the south of the valley from west to east. It is joined to Narrow Neck Plateau by a low ridge which is also the site of the Ruined Castle, a rock formation that is popular with bushwalkers. Immediately east of Mount Solitary is a property called Kedumba Farm, which is no longer worked as a farm.

South of Mount Solitary, the valley sprawls through Cedar and Kedumba Valley down to Coxs River and Lake Burragorang, the lake that was created when Warragamba Dam was built. There is a 3 kilometres (1.9 mi) prohibited area around the river and lake to protect Sydney's water supply. Around this area there is a high-tension power line that crosses the valley from east to west; it is followed by a series of service roads that provide access to the powerline and to the area, although much of it is in the prohibited area. These service roads make it possible to do a trek taking in the whole valley, but it is necessary to get permission from Sydney Water to go through the prohibited area. The Katoomba and Jamison topographic maps are essential for any of these walks.

The northern escarpment is deeply serrated, having been carved up by watercourses over millions of years. Watercourses include Jamison Creek, Valley of the Waters Creek, Gordons Creek, Leura Falls Creek, Kedumba River and Causeway Creek. There are also numerous waterfalls, including Wentworth Falls, Empress Falls, Vera Falls, Gordon Falls, Leura Falls and Katoomba Falls.

The valley is densely forested, with eucalypt forest over most of its expanse and occasional pockets of semi-rainforest in gullies, where water is concentrated.

== Activities ==
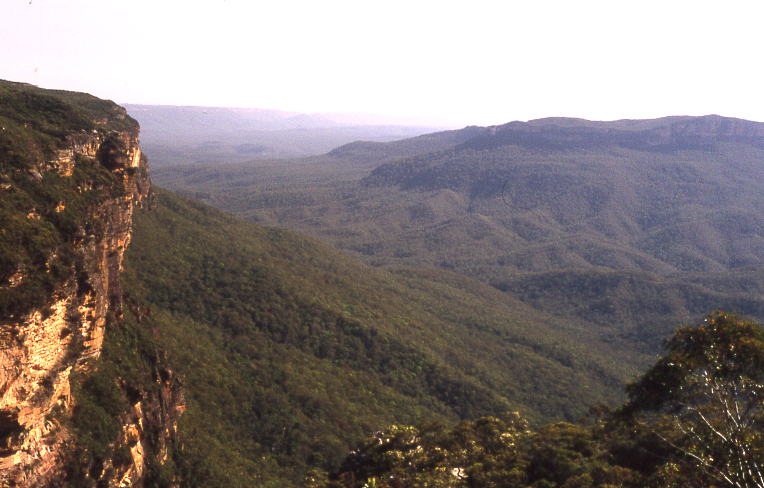
View of the Jamison Valley from near Wentworth Falls

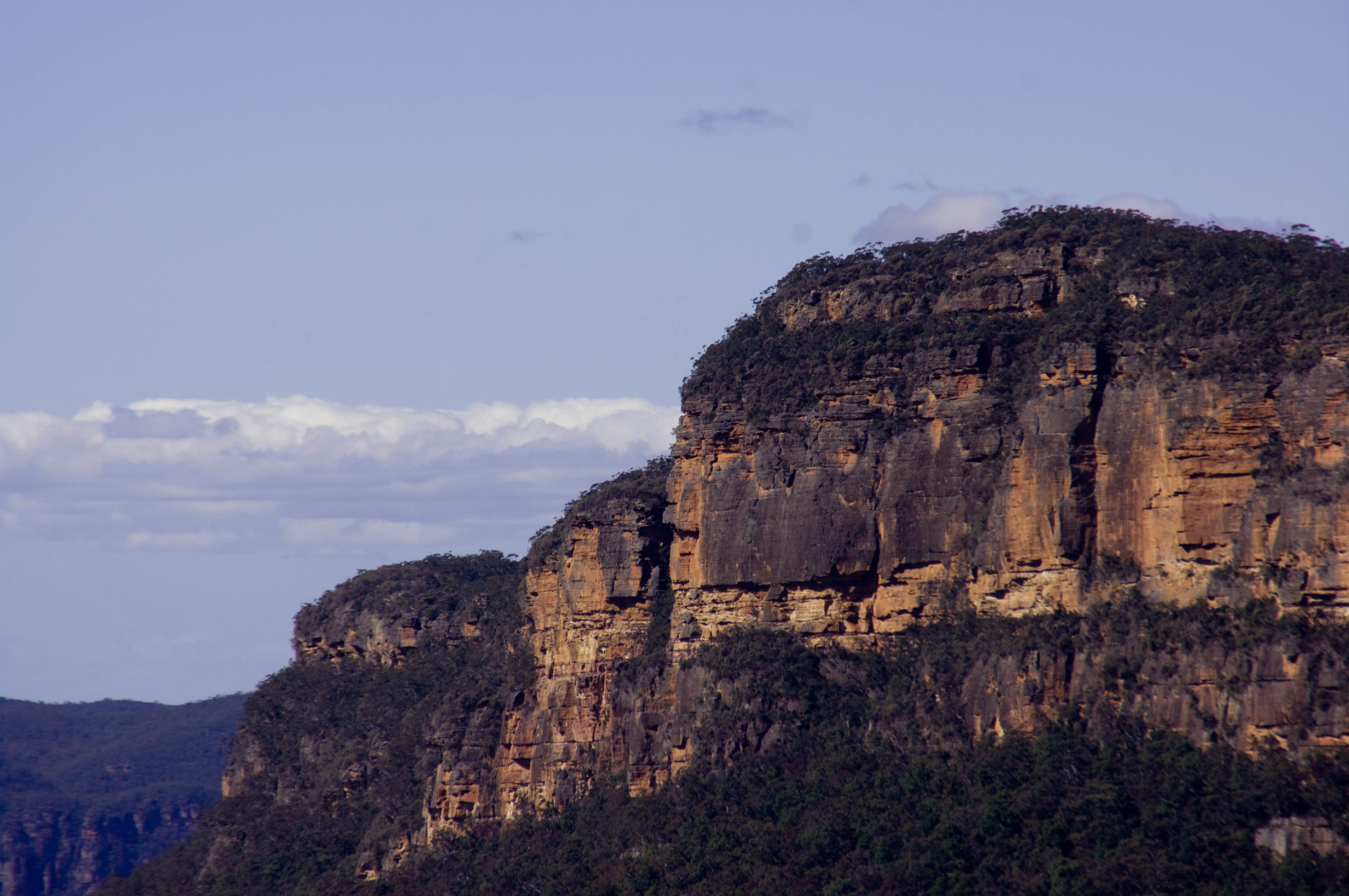
Narrow Neck peninsula

The Jamison Valley is commonly visited by bushwalkers and campers. There is a network of tracks across the northern escarpment, including Darwin's Walk, the tracks in the Valley of the Waters and old, neglected tracks that Blue Mountains bushwalkers have been trying to restore for years. Tracks are also found along the cliffs near Leura and Katoomba, as well as tracks like the Federal Pass, located at the foot of the cliffs.

A track also goes west around to the Ruined Castle and Mount Solitary. The track continues across the mountain but is patchy and suitable only for experienced walkers. It is possible to then go up to Kings Tableland and into Wentworth Falls, making a trek of at least three days. The tracks closer to the escarpment are suitable for one-day walks. Mount Solitary is used mostly for camping trips, although some walkers have been known to make one-day walks to the mountain. In this part of the valley there was formerly a sewage treatment plant, not far below the northern escarpment. It was serviced by a dirt road that went up to Kings Tableland and thence to Wentworth Falls town. The plant was closed down in the 1990s, but the service road remains and can be used by bushwalkers.

== Attractions ==
Attractions include Scenic World, a tourist complex north of the valley. And as well as the steepest funicular railway in the world, the Katoomba Scenic Railway, which was originally built to facilitate coal and oil shale mining in the Jamison Valley. Scenic World also offers the Scenic Skyway cable car, which travels over an arm of the Jamison Valley and offers views of Katoomba Falls and Orphan Rock.

The Three Sisters, which are on the northern escarpment of the valley, are one of Australia's most-photographed landmarks.

The Giant Stairway walking track runs down a cliff into the Jamison Valley, near the Three Sisters, providing access to nature walks through the valley.

=== Major lookouts ===
- 33°45′21″S 150°17′14″E - Castle Head
- 33°43′58″S 150°18′43″E - Echo Point
- 33°43′59″S 150°17′56″E - Eagle Hawk Lookout
- 33°43′35″S 150°19′48″E - Elysian Rock Lookout
- 33°43′38″S 150°20′08″E - Golf Links Lookout
- 33°43′36″S 150°19′57″E - Gordon Falls Lookout
- 33°43′50″S 150°17′48″E - Hilda's Lookout
- 33°43′32″S 150°22′09″E - Jamison Lookout
- 33°43′19″S 150°19′11″E - Kiah Lookout
- 33°43′56″S 150°18′56″E - Lady Carrington Lookout
- 33°43′49″S 150°18′32″E - Lady Darleys Lookout
- 33°43′55″S 150°17′45″E - Landslide Lookout
- 33°44′26″S 150°22′19″E - Lincoln's Rock Lookout
- 33°43′59″S 150°17′56″E - Malaita Lookout
- 33°43′40″S 150°17′32″E - Narrow Neck Lookout
- 33°43′43″S 150°22′25″E - Rocket Point
- 33°43′58″S 150°18′47″E - Spooners Lookout
- 33°44′15″S 150°20′19″E - Sublime Point Lookout
- 33°43′27″S 150°19′31″E - Tarpeian Rock
- 33°44′8″S 150°18′52″E Three Sisters Lookout
- 33°43′34″S 150°22′19″E - Wentworth Falls Lookout
- 33°43′38″S 150°22′17″E - Princes Rock Lookout

== Transport ==
The closest railway stations to the valley is the Katoomba railway station, Leura railway station and Wentworth Falls railway station, which are on the Blue Mountains Line.

The Great Western Highway is the main road that is proximate to the Jamison Valley.

Katoomba Airfield is also located about 11.5 kilometres (7.1 mi) by road from the Katoomba Central business district. The airfield is currently closed to airplanes and helicopters. The site remains available for use by emergency services.
