= List of wars involving Australia =

Australia, including its predecessor colonies – New South Wales, Van Diemen's Land, Tasmania, Victoria, Swan River, Western Australia, South Australia, and Queensland – has been involved in several wars, armed conflicts, rebellions and militarised interstate disputes.

For a list of wars that have been fought on the Australian mainland and in Australian waters, see the list of conflicts in Australia.

Dates indicate the years in which Australia was involved in the war.

Victory
Defeat
Another result (e.g. a treaty or peace without a clear result, status quo ante bellum, result of civil or internal conflict, result unknown or indecisive, inconclusive)
Ongoing conflict

== Colonial Australia (1788–1901) ==
Colonial Australia was the Commonwealth of Australia's predecessor colonies, the colonies of New South Wales (1788–1901), Van Diemen's Land (1825–1856), Tasmania (1856–1901), Victoria (1851–1901), Swan River (1829–1833), Western Australia (1833–1901), South Australia (1836–1901), Queensland (1859–1901) and their territories and islands.

List of wars involving Colonial Australia
| Conflict | Combatant 1 | Combatant 2 | Result for Australia and/or its allies | Australian losses (Killed or missing) | | Notable battles |
| Conflict | Combatant 1 | Combatant 2 | Result for Australia and/or its allies | Military | Civilians | Notable battles |
|---|---|---|---|---|---|---|
| Sydney Cove War (1790–1800) part of Australian frontier wars | Kingdom of Great Britain (1790–1800): (Kingdom of Great Britain) New South Wales Corps (1790–1800); (United Kingdom) Colony of New South Wales; United Kingdom (1801–1802): (United Kingdom) New South Wales Corps (1801–1802); (United Kingdom) Colony of New South Wales | Aboriginal Australians | Victory: Dispossession of land of the indigenous clans | 26 | | |
| Pemulwuy's War (1790–1802) part of Hawkesbury and Nepean Wars and Australian frontier wars | Kingdom of Great Britain (1790–1800): (Kingdom of Great Britain) New South Wales Corps (1790–1800); United Kingdom (1801–1802): (United Kingdom) New South Wales Corps (1801–1802); (United Kingdom) Colony of New South Wales; Burraberongal Tribe (1795–1802) | Indigenous peoples: Dharug Nation; Bidjigal clan | Victory: Dispossession of land of the indigenous clans; Death of Pemulwuy | 44 | 3 | Battle of Parramatta – 1797 |
| Hawkesbury and Nepean Wars (1794–1816) part of Australian frontier wars | Kingdom of Great Britain (1795–1800): (Kingdom of Great Britain) New South Wales Corps (1795–1800); United Kingdom (1801–16): (United Kingdom) New South Wales Corps (1801–10); (United Kingdom) New South Wales; Burraberongal Tribe | Indigenous peoples: Dharug Nation; Wangal clan; Kurrajong clan; Boorooberongal clan; Cattai clan; Bidjigal clan; Gommerigal clan; Mulgoa clan; Cannemegal clan; Bool-bain-ora clan; Cabrigal clan; Muringong clan; Dural clan; Eora Nation; Tharawal Nation; Gandangara Nation; Irish-convict sympathisers | Victory: Dispossession of land of the indigenous clans; Legal disputes until 1992 Mabo decision | 80–380+ | unknown | Battle of Richmond Hill – 1795; Battle of Parramatta – 1797; Battle of Bond's Farm – 1809; Appin Massacre – 1816 |
| Black Wars (1799–1805) part of Hawkesbury and Nepean Wars and Australian frontier wars | Kingdom of Great Britain (1799–1800): (Kingdom of Great Britain) New South Wales Corps (1799–1800); United Kingdom of Great Britain and Ireland (1801–1805): (United Kingdom) New South Wales Corps; (United Kingdom) Colony of New South Wales; Burraberongal Tribe (1799–1802) | Indigenous clans: Dharug Nation; Wangal clan; Kurrajong clan; Boorooberongal clan; Cattai clan; Bidjigal clan; Gommerigal clan; Mulgoa clan; Cannemegal clan; Bool-bain-ora clan; Cabrigal clan; Muringong clan; Dural clan; Eora Nation; Tharawal Nation; Gandangara Nation; Irish-convict sympathisers | Victory: Dispossession of land of the indigenous clans | unknown | unknown | |
| Tedbury's War (1802–1810) part of Hawkesbury and Nepean Wars and Australian frontier wars | United Kingdom of Great Britain and Ireland: (United Kingdom) Colony of New South Wales | Indigenous clans: Dharug Nation; Wangal clan; Kurrajong clan; Boorooberongal clan; Cattai clan; Bidjigal clan; Gommerigal clan; Mulgoa clan; Cannemegal clan; Bool-bain-ora clan; Cabrigal clan; Muringong clan; Dural clan; Eora Nation | Victory: Dispossession of land of the indigenous clans; Death of Tedbury | unknown | 3+ | Battle of Bond's Farm – 1809 |
| Bathurst War (1824) part of Australian frontier wars | United Kingdom: (United Kingdom) Colony of New South Wales | Wiradjuri nation | Victory: Dispossession of land from the Wiradjuri nation and possession of Bathurst county | ~20 | 0 | Battle of Bathurst – 1824 |
| Hawkesbury Nepean War (1814–1816) part of Hawkesbury and Nepean Wars and Australian frontier wars | United Kingdom of Great Britain and Ireland: (United Kingdom) Colony of New South Wales | Indigenous clans: Dharug Nation; Wangal clan; Kurrajong clan; Boorooberongal clan; Cattai clan; Bidjigal clan; Gommerigal clan; Mulgoa clan; Cannemegal clan; Bool-bain-ora clan; Cabrigal clan; Muringong clan; Dural clan; Eora Nation; Tharawal Nation; Gandangara Nation; Irish-convict sympathisers | Victory: Dispossession of land of the indigenous clans | unknown | 9+ | Appin Massacre – 1816; Battle of the Nepean – 1816; Nepean Campaign – 1816 |
| Black War (1828–32) part of Australian frontier wars | United Kingdom: (United Kingdom) New South Wales; Van Diemen's Land | Aboriginal Tasmanians | Victory: Indigenous Tasmanians dispossessed, population declines and culture disrupted; Survivors surrender and are relocated to Wybalenna Aboriginal Mission | 201 | 18 | |
| Port Phillip District Wars (1830–1850) part of Australian frontier wars | United Kingdom: (United Kingdom) New South Wales | Aboriginal Australians: Gunditjmara People; Dja Dja Wurrung; Taungurung; Gunai Kurnai people | Victory: European occupation of the district; Deaths of up to more than 1,000 Aboriginals | 0 | 7–11 | Battle of Pinjarra – 1834; Mount Cottrell massacre – 1836; Battle of Broken River – 1838; Campaspe Plains massacre – 1839; Blood Hole massacre – 1839 or 1840 |
| The Eumeralla Wars (1834–1849 or 1860s) part of Australian frontier wars | United Kingdom: (United Kingdom) New South Wales; (United Kingdom) Victoria | Aboriginal Australians: Gunditjmara People | Victory: British occupation of the district | ~80 | | |
| Moreton Bay conflict (1832–1833) part of Australian frontier wars | United Kingdom: (United Kingdom) New South Wales | Quandamooka people (Nunukul, Ngugi, and Gorenpul clans) | Indeterminate: Stalemate; British withdrawal from North Stradbroke Island; Establishment of limited coexistence between settlement and Quandamooka people | 5–8 killed; dozens wounded | ≈30–40 killed or wounded | |
| Wiradjuri Wars (1838–1841) part of Australian frontier wars | United Kingdom of Great Britain and Ireland: (United Kingdom) Colony of New South Wales | Wiradjuri people | Victory: Dispossession of land of the indigenous clans; Occupation and settlement of European colonists on conquered land | Unknown | | |
| Mandandanji Land War (1842–1852) part of Australian frontier wars | United Kingdom: (United Kingdom) New South Wales | Mandandanji people | Victory: Dispossession of land of the indigenous clans; Occupation and settlement of European colonists on conquered land | Unknown | | |
| War of Southern Queensland (1843–1855) part of Australian frontier wars | United Kingdom: (United Kingdom) New South Wales | Aboriginal Australians: United Tribes Confederation; Jagera People; Wakka Wakka People; Kabi Kabi People; Jinibara People | Victory: Dispossession of land of the indigenous clans; Occupation and settlement of European colonists on conquered land | ~700 – 1000 Europeans; Several thousand Indigenous | | Battle of One Tree Hill – 1843 |
| Port Augusta War (1844–1845) part of Australian frontier wars | United Kingdom of Great Britain and Ireland: (United Kingdom) Colony of South Australia | Aboriginal Australians Nukunu people | Victory: Dispossession of land of the indigenous clans; Occupation and settlement of European colonists on conquered land | | | |
| Flagstaff War (1845–1846) Part of New Zealand Wars | British Empire: United Kingdom; (United Kingdom) Colony of New South Wales; Colony of New Zealand; Forces of Tamati Waka Nene Māori Kupapa | Ngāpuhi Iwi | Inconclusive/Ceasefire: Kawiti and Heke's rebellion defeated; Kawiti and Heke approached Tāmati Wāka Nene about a ceasefire; British claimed a tactical victory; British negotiate peace with Kawiti in 1846; British negotiate peace with Heke in 1848. | | | Battle of Puketutu – 1845; Raid on Waikare – 1845; Battle of Te Ahuahu – 1845; Battle of Ōhaeawai – 1845; Battle of Ruapekapeka – 1845–1846 |
| Hutt Valley Campaign(1846) Part of New Zealand Wars | British Empire: United Kingdom; (United Kingdom) Colony of New South Wales; Colony of New Zealand; (United Kingdom) British Settlers Te Āti Awa Māori Kupapa | Ngāti Toa Iwi Ngāti Rangatahi Ngāti Hāuaterangi | Victory | | | |
| Eureka Rebellion (1851–1854) | (United Kingdom) Colony of Victoria: (United Kingdom) British Army; (United Kingdom) Victoria Police | Anti-Gold Licence Association (Red Ribbon Rebellion) Stockade rebels | Victory: Miners rebellion defeated by the Victorian authorities | 2 Government Troops; 22-60 Rebels | unknown | Battle of the Eureka Stockade - 1854 |
| First Taranaki War (1860–1861) Part of New Zealand Wars | British Empire: (United Kingdom) Colony of New South Wales; (United Kingdom) Colony of Queensland; (United Kingdom) Colony of Victoria; (United Kingdom) Colony of Tasmania; Colony of New Zealand | Taranaki Māori Kīngitanga | Ceasefire: Truce agreed to after the surrender of the Te Ārei pā; Waikato Invasion plans made; Māori remained in possession of the European-owned Tātaraimaka | 20 approximately | 0 | Battle at Te Kohia – 1860; Battle of Waireka – 1860; Battle of Puketakauere – 1860 |
| Waikato Wars (1863–1864) Part of New Zealand Wars | British Empire: (United Kingdom) Colony of New South Wales; (United Kingdom) Colony of Queensland; (United Kingdom) Colony of Victoria; (United Kingdom) Colony of Tasmania; Colony of New Zealand | Kīngitanga North Island allies: Ngāti Maniapoto; Ngāti Pou; Ngāi Tūhoe; Ngāti Raukawa | Victory: Kingite power crushed; Waikato Māori expelled south of the Waikato River.; Occupation and settlement of European colonists on conquered land | 20 approximately | | |
| Second Taranaki War (1863–1866) Part of New Zealand Wars | British Empire: (United Kingdom) Colony of New South Wales; (United Kingdom) Colony of Queensland; (United Kingdom) Colony of Victoria; (United Kingdom) Colony of Tasmania; Colony of New Zealand | Taranaki Māori | Inconclusive: Tribes either surrendered or withdrew towards the mountain. | 20 approximately | | |
| Tauranga Campaign (1864) Part of the New Zealand Wars | British Empire: (United Kingdom) Colony of New South Wales; (United Kingdom) Colony of Queensland; (United Kingdom) Colony of Victoria; (United Kingdom) Colony of Tasmania; Colony of New Zealand; (United Kingdom) British Settlers Māori Kupapa | Taranaki Māori: Ngāi Te Rangi; Ngāti Koheriki; Ngāti Pikiao; Ngāti Porou; Ngāti Pukenga | Victory | 20 approximately | | Battle of Gate Pā – 1864; Battle of Te Ranga – 1864 |
| East Cape War (1865–1866) Part of New Zealand Wars | British Empire: (United Kingdom) Colony of New South Wales; (United Kingdom) Colony of Queensland; (United Kingdom) Colony of Victoria; (United Kingdom) Colony of Tasmania; Colony of New Zealand; (United Kingdom) British Settlers Māori Kupapa: Arawa; Ngāti Porou; Ngāti Kahungunu | Hau-Hauist Māori Whakatohea Māori Urewera Māori Ngai Tama Māori | Victory: Dispossession of land of the indigenous Māori; Occupation and settlement of European colonists on conquered land; 2013 Crown apology | 20 approximately | | Siege of Waerenga-a-Hika – 1865 |
| Kalkadoon Wars (1870–1890) part of Australian frontier wars | United Kingdom: Queensland | Kalkadoon people | Victory | 100(est.) | 5 | Battle of Battle Mountain – 1884 |
| Mahdist War (1885) | British Empire: Khedivate of Egypt; India; Colony of New South Wales; New South Wales Contingent; Canada; Ethiopia Italy: (Kingdom of Italy) Eritrea; Congo Free State | Mahdist Sudan | Victory: Sudan becomes Anglo-Egyptian Sudan, a condominium of the British Empire and Khedivate of Egypt | 9 (from sickness on the return home) | 3 | Suakin Expedition |
| Jandamarra Guerrilla War (1894–97) part of Australian frontier wars | British Empire: Western Australia | Jandamarra; Bunuba people | Victory: Death of Jandamarra | 2+ | unknown | |

== Commonwealth of Australia (1901–present) ==
List of wars involving the Commonwealth of Australia
| Conflict | Combatant 1 | Combatant 2 | Result for Australia and/or its allies | Australian losses (Killed or missing) | | Notable battles |
| Conflict | Combatant 1 | Combatant 2 | Result for Australia and/or its allies | Military | Civilians | Notable battles |
|---|---|---|---|---|---|---|
| Second Boer War (1899–1902) Part of the Boer Wars during the Scramble for Africa | United Kingdom: Cape Colony; Natal Colony; Basutoland; Bechuanaland; Rhodesia; India; Ceylon; Canada; New Zealand; Australia (Note: Before Federation in 1901, Australian involvement in the war consisted of forces from each of the six colonies.) | Orange Free State; South African Republic | Victory: Treaty of Vereeniging | 606 | None | |
| Boxer Rebellion (1900–1901) | British Empire; United Kingdom; Australia; New Zealand; India; Japan; (Russia) Russian Empire; France; United States; Germany; Austria-Hungary; Italy | Yihetuan; Qing China | Victory: Rebellion suppressed; Signing of the Boxer Protocol; Provisions for foreign troops stationed in Beijing | 6 | None | |
| World War I (1914-1918) | Allied Powers: France; British Empire; United Kingdom; Newfoundland; Canada; Australia; New Zealand; India; South Africa; Russia; United States; Italy; Belgium; Japan; Hejaz; and others | Central Powers: Germany; Austria-Hungary; Ottoman Empire; Bulgaria | Victory: End of the German, Russian, Ottoman, and Austro-Hungarian empires; New countries formed in Europe and the Middle East; Establishment of the League of Nations; Australia obtains mandates in New Guinea and Nauru | 62,149 | None | |
| Allied intervention in the Russian Civil War (1918–1920) | Allied Powers: (Russian Empire) White Movement; France; United Kingdom; United States; China; Italy; Japan; Australia; India; South Africa; Serbia; Romania; Greece; Czechoslovakia; Poland; Estonia | Bolsheviks: Russian SFSR; Far Eastern Republic; Latvian Socialist Soviet Republic; Ukrainian SSR | Defeat: Allied withdrawal from Russia; Bolshevik victory over White Army; The Soviet Union becomes the new Russian power | 10 | Unknown | |
| Egyptian Revolution of 1919 (1918–1919) | United Kingdom: Sultanate of Egypt; Anglo-Egyptian Sudan; Australia; New Zealand | Wafd Party | Victory: British recognition of Egyptian independence; Implementation of a new constitution; Establishment of the Kingdom of Egypt; Continued British presence in Egypt and Sudan | 1 | unknown | |
| 1927 Malaita Punitive Expedition (1927) | British Empire; British Solomon Islands Protectorate; Australia | Kwaio warriors | Victory: Stabilisation of Malaita; 198 Kwaio arrested and detained | None | None | |
| World War II (1939–1945) An Australian light machine gun team in action during the Aitape–Wewak campaign, June 1945. | United States; Soviet Union; United Kingdom; China; France; Poland; Yugoslavia; Greece; Netherlands; Belgium; Luxembourg; Denmark; Norway; Czechoslovakia; Canada; Australia; New Zealand; India; South Africa; Philippines; (Ethiopian Empire) Ethiopia; Brazil; Mexico; (Mongolian People's Republic) Mongolia | Germany; Japan; Italy; Hungary; Romania; Bulgaria; Slovakia; Croatia; Finland; Iraq; Thailand | Victory: Collapse of the German Reich and the Empire of Japan; Creation of the United Nations; Australian New Guinea and Nauru become UN trust territories; Emergence of the United States and the Soviet Union as superpowers; Beginning of the Cold War | 39,366 | 735 | Battle of the Coral Sea – 1942 |
| Anglo-Iraqi War (1941) Part of the Second World War | Allied powers: United Kingdom; India; Palestine; Assyrian Levies; Transjordan; 'Abd al-Ilah loyalists; Air and naval support: Australia (Note: HMAS Yarra, representing Australia, participated at sea.); New Zealand (Note: HMNZS Leander, representing New Zealand, participated at sea.); Greece (Note: Greek airmen undergoing training at Habbaniya flew sorties against the Iraqis.) | Axis powers : Kingdom of Iraq; Military support : Germany; Italy; Vichy France | Victory: Downfall of Rashid Gaylani government; Re-occupation of Iraq by the British; The return to power of the Regent of Iraq, Prince 'Abd al-Ilah | None | None | |
| Korean War (1950–1953) | South Korea; United States; United Kingdom; Canada; Australia; New Zealand; Turkey; Philippines; Thailand; Ethiopia; Greece; France; Colombia; Belgium; South Africa; Netherlands; Luxembourg | North Korea; China; Soviet Union | Ceasefire: Ceasefire armistice; Korean Demilitarized Zone established, minimal territorial change at the 38th parallel border | 340 | None | |
| Malayan Emergency (1950–1960) | United Kingdom; Malaya; Australia; New Zealand | MNLA | Victory: Communist retreat from Malaya, Chin Peng exiled | 39 | None | |
| Borneo Confrontation (1963–1966) | Malaysia; United Kingdom; Australia; New Zealand | Indonesia | Victory: Indonesia accepts the formation of Malaysia | 23 | None | |
| Vietnam War (1965–1973) Members of 5 Platoon 7 RAR waiting for US Army helicopters in August 1967. | South Vietnam; United States; South Korea; Australia; New Zealand; Thailand; Philippines; Laos; Cambodia; (Cambodia) Khmer Republic | North Vietnam; (Provisional Revolutionary Government of the Republic of South Vietnam) Viet Cong; (Laos) Pathet Lao; (Cambodia) Khmer Rouge; China; Soviet Union; North Korea | Defeat: Withdrawal of American-led forces from Indochina in 1973; Communist governments take power in South Vietnam, Cambodia and Laos in 1975 | 521 | None | |
| Gulf War (1990–1991) | Kuwait; United States; United Kingdom; Saudi Arabia; France; Canada; Egypt; Syria; Oman; United Arab Emirates; Qatar; Italy; Australia; Other Allies | Iraq | Victory: Iraqi withdrawal from Kuwait; Emir Jaber Al-Ahmad Al-Jaber Al-Sabah restored | None | None | |
| Australian-led international intervention into the 1999 East Timorese crisis (1999–2000) | East Timor; Australia; New Zealand; Thailand; Supported by: Argentina; Austria; Bangladesh; Benin; Bolivia; Bosnia and Herzegovina; Brazil; Bulgaria; Canada; Chile; China; Croatia; Denmark; Egypt; Fiji; France; Gambia; Germany; Ghana; Israel; Ireland; Italy; Japan; Jordan; Kenya; Malaysia; Mexico; Mozambique; Namibia; Nepal; Niger; Nigeria; Norway; Pakistan; Peru; Philippines; Portugal; Russia; Samoa; Senegal; Serbia and Montenegro; Singapore; Slovakia; Slovenia; Spain; South Korea; Sri Lanka; Sweden; Tajikistan; Turkey; Ukraine; Uruguay; United Kingdom; United States; Vanuatu; Zambia; Zimbabwe | Pro-Indonesian militias – 13,000; Aitarak; Besi Merah Putih; Laksaur; Mahidi; Supported by: Kopassus (alleged); BIN; Jakarta lobby | Victory: Defeat of pro-Indonesian militia; Stabilisation of East Timor; East Timorese independence referendum; US embargo of military sales to Indonesia from 9 September 1999 to 22 November 2005; UK embargo of military sales to Indonesia from 11 September 1999 to 11 April 2012; Australia embargo military sales to Indonesia September 1999; European Union (EU) embargo military sales to Indonesia 16 September 1999 – 17 January 2000 | 2 | None | |
| War in Afghanistan (2001–2021) | Afghanistan; United States; United Kingdom; Canada; Australia; New Zealand; Germany; France; Italy; Czech Republic; Netherlands; Turkey; Romania; Georgia; South Korea; Poland; Denmark; Sweden; Norway; Singapore; (Afghanistan) Northern Alliance | (Afghanistan) Taliban; al-Qaeda; Islamic Emirate of Afghanistan | Defeat: Fall of the Islamic Republic of Afghanistan; Establishment of the Islamic Emirate of Afghanistan; War in North-West Pakistan; Renewed Taliban offensive in 2021; In July 2021, Australian Defence Minister Peter Dutton states Australia has ended its involvement.; Afghan government surrenders power to the Taliban in accordance to the Doha Peace Agreement; President Ashraf Ghani flees to Tajikistan | 41 | None | |
| Iraq War (2003–2009) | Iraq; Iraqi Kurdistan; United States; United Kingdom; South Korea; Italy; Poland; Australia; New Zealand; Georgia; Ukraine; Netherlands; Spain; Romania; Bulgaria; Denmark; Thailand | (Iraq) SCJL; (Iraq) Naqshbandi Army; Islamic State of Iraq; al-Qaeda; Ansar al-Islam; Islamic Army of Iraq; Mahdi Army; Badr Brigades; Kata'ib Hezbollah; Ba'athist Iraq | Victory: Overthrow of Ba'ath Party government; Iraqi insurgency, emergence of al-Qaeda in Iraq, and sectarian violence; Escalation of sectarian insurgency after U.S. withdrawal leading to the rise of the ISIL | 2 | None | |
| Operation Anode (2003–2013) Australian soldiers assigned to RAMSI burning guns in October 2003. | Solomon Islands; Australia; Fiji; New Zealand; Papua New Guinea; Marshall Islands; Federated States of Micronesia; Tonga; Samoa; Vanuatu; Nauru; Kiribati; Tuvalu | Solomon Islands Nationalist Militias; Isatabu Freedom Movement; Malaita Eagle Force; Other unorganised militias | Victory: Stabilisation of Solomon Islands; Australia, New Zealand, Tonga and Papua New Guinean forces withdraw forces | 1 | None | |
| Iraqi civil war (2006–2008) (2006–2008) Part of the Iraq War | Iraq; (Iraq) Iraqi security forces; Iraqi Kurdistan; United States; United Kingdom; Australia; Poland; Italy; Other coalition forces; Private Security Contractors; (Kurdistan Region) Peshmerga; Sons of Iraq | Sunni factions: Mujahideen Shura Council; al-Qaeda in Iraq (until October 2006); Islamic State of Iraq; Ansar al-Sunna; Islamic Army in Iraq; Sunni tribes; Other Sunni insurgent groups; Iraqi Ba'ath Party Loyalists; Supreme Command for Jihad and Liberation; Army of the Men of the Naqshbandi Order; Shi'ite factions: Mahdi Army; Special Groups; Asa'ib Ahl al-Haq; Kata'ib Hezbollah; Promised Day Brigades; Badr Brigades; Rogue elements among the Iraqi security forces; Soldiers of Heaven; Shia tribes; Other militias | Victory: Ethnic cleansing of Sunnis by the Mahdi Army; Attempt of ethnic cleansing of Shias by Al-Qaeda in Iraq; 4 million people displaced; U.S. Troop Surge in January 2007; Ceasefire signed with Mahdi Army; Al-Qaeda in Iraq territorially defeated; Presence of British and American troops in advise and assist roles until 2011; Continued Al-Qaeda insurgency in Iraq; Resurgence of Al-Qaeda in Iraq, which later becomes known as ISIL or ISIS following the withdrawal of American troops from Iraq in 2011 | None | None | |
| Operation Astute (2006–2013) Part of 2006 East Timorese crisis Australian soldiers supporting the Dili Fire Service in June 2006. | Australia; New Zealand; Malaysia; Portugal; East Timor | (Timor-Leste) FDTL Rebels | Victory: Stabilisation of East Timor | 3 | None | |
| Operation Ocean Shield (2009–2016) | NATO; United States; Belgium; Canada; Denmark; Germany; Greece; Italy; Netherlands; Norway; Portugal; Spain; Turkey; United Kingdom; Australia; China; Colombia; India; Indonesia; Japan; Malaysia; New Zealand; Oman; Pakistan; Russia; Saudi Arabia; Seychelles; Singapore; Somalia; South Korea; Ukraine | * Somali pirates | Victory: Number of pirate attacks dramatically decreased; The US Office of Naval Intelligence have officially reported that in 2013, only 9 incidents of piracy were reported and that none of them were successfully hijacked; Piracy drops 90% | None | None | |
| Iraqi Civil War (2013–2017) (2014–2017) Part of the Iraqi conflict, spillover of the Syrian civil war, international military intervention against the Islamic State and the war on terror | Iraq; Allied groups: Iraqi Turkmen Front; Liwa Abu al-Fadhal al-Abbas; Iraqi Communist Party; Various self-defense groups and tribal militias; CJTF-OIR Members: United States; United Kingdom; Australia; New Zealand; France; Italy; Netherlands; Jordan; Kuwait; Turkey (2014–2017); Canada (2014–2016); Belgium (2014–2017); Denmark (2014–2016); Morocco (2014–2016); Iran; Hezbollah; Syria (2014); Iraqi Kurdistan; Peshmerga; Kurdish National Council; Sinjar Alliance; PKK; Syrian Kurdistan; Further Support: Albania; Belarus; Bosnia and Herzegovina; China; Croatia; Czechia; Estonia; Finland; Germany; Hungary; Pakistan; Russia; Taiwan | Islamic State; Military of ISIL; Other anti-government groups: GMCIR; PCIR; Various Ba'athist factions; (Ba'athist Iraq) Naqshbandi Army; Anbar tribial militias; Free Iraqi Army (2014); Jihad and Reform Front; Ansar al-Islam; White Flags | Victory: Iraqi territorial integrity preserved; ISIL expelled from all strongholds by 11 November 2017; Iraq declares the defeat of ISIL on 9 December 2017 after securing the western desert with neighbouring Syria; Iraqi federal government captures 20% of territory controlled by KRG after an independence referendum; Continued lower-level ISIL insurgency following defeat | 1 | 0 | |
| American-led intervention in Syrian civil war (2014–2017) Part of the Syrian civil war, international military intervention against the Islamic State and the war on terror | CJTF-OIR Members: United States; Australia; New Zealand; Canada; Belgium; Denmark; France; Germany; Italy; Netherlands; Romania; United Kingdom; Lebanon; Morocco; Jordan; Saudi Arabia; United Arab Emirates; Qatar; Bahrain; Supported by: Iraq; Kurdistan Regional Government; (Syrian opposition) Revolutionary Commando Army; (Syrian opposition) Authenticity and Development Front; (Syrian opposition) Free Syrian Army; Autonomous Administration of North and East Syria; Syrian Democratic Forces; International Freedom Battalion; People's Protection Units; Women's Protection Units; Al-Sanadid Forces; Euphrates Volcano; Turkey; (Syrian opposition) Turkish-backed rebels; Israel (limited involvement; against Hezbollah and government forces only) | Islamic State of Iraq and Syria; al-Qaeda linked groups: al-Nusra Front; Khorasan group; Tahrir al-Sham; Jaysh al-Sunna; Jund al-Aqsa; Rouse the Believers Operations Room; Guardians of Religion Organization; Turkistan Islamic Party in Syria; Ahrar al-Sham; Syria; Russia; Iran; Supported by: Kata'ib Hezbollah | Inconclusive, conflict ongoing: Australia ends airstrikes in 2017; Operation Okra; Over 11,200 American and allied airstrikes hit ISIS and other extremist groups within Syria; Thousands of ISIS targets destroyed and thousands more militants captured or killed; ISIL lose Mosul and Raqqa (2017), then other most of territory in Iraq and then Syria; Syrian government Chemical attack in Ghouta (2013) leading to OPCW-UN Joint Mission in Syria; American support for anti-government rebels; Deployment of U.S. Marines and Special Forces; Massive amounts of human rights violations and war crimes, in particular by Syrian government forces; Semi-regular chemical attacks attributed to the Assad regime leads to condemnation and threats of measures to enforce the chemical weapons convention and the Geneva protocol to which Syria is a party. Chemical attack in Khan Shaykhun results in a retaliatory naval strike on the Syrian government-controlled Shayrat Airbase, Douma chemical attack results in retaliatory strikes/; Various confrontations and airstrikes; ISIS detainee crisis takes hold in northern Syria; Death of Abu Bakr al-Baghdadi on October 27, 2019; Approximately 900 U.S. troops remain in Syria to combat ISIS as of July 2021; Death of Abu Ibrahim al-Hashimi al-Qurashi on February 3, 2022 | None | None | |
| War on ISIL (2014–present) Part of the Second Libyan Civil War, War in Iraq (2013–2017), Syrian civil war and spillover of the Syrian civil war, Sinai insurgency, Boko Haram insurgency, insurgency in the North Caucasus, war on terror, and Moro conflict | Iraq; Iraqi Kurdistan; Syrian Kurdistan; United States; United Kingdom; Canada; France; Germany; Australia; Turkey; Saudi Arabia; Qatar; Jordan; Bahrain; United Arab Emirates; Morocco; New Zealand; Netherlands; Belgium; Denmark; Norway | Islamic State of Iraq and the Levant; al-Qaeda | Ongoing: Airstrikes on ISIL and al-Qaeda positions in Iraq, Syria, Libya, Nigeria, and Afghanistan | None | None | |
| Marawi crisis (2017) Part of the Moro conflict and the Military intervention against ISIL | Philippines Supported by: MNLF; MILF; United States; Australia; United Kingdom; China; Israel; Russia; Singapore | Islamic State of Iraq and the Levant: Islamic State Province in East Asia; Abu Sayyaf; Maute group; Bangsamoro Islamic Freedom Fighters | Victory: Failure of the militants to establish a provincial ISIL territory (wilayat); Martial law declared in Mindanao until December 31, 2017, extended throughout 2018–19; Isnilon Hapilon, Abu Sayyaf leader and ISIL Emir in Southeast Asia killed by the Philippine Army; All seven Maute brothers killed by the Philippine Army | None | None | |
| Islamic State insurgency in Iraq (2017–present) (2017–2021) Part of the Iraqi conflict (2003–present) | Iraq: Iraqi Federal Police; Iraqi Armed Forces; Special Operations Forces (SOF); Popular Mobilization Forces (PMF); Pro-Government Tribes Rojava (cross-border cooperation since May 2018) CJTF-OIR (until 2021): United States; United Kingdom; Australia; Germany; France; Italy; Supported by: Iran Qatar Egypt NATO: Canada; Turkey; Kurdistan Region: Peshmerga; Supported by: Netherlands | Islamic State White Flags Iraqi Baath Party | Inconclusive, conflict ongoing: Airstrikes on ISIL positions | None | None | |
| 2019–2022 Persian Gulf crisis (2019–2020) Part of the Iran–Saudi Arabia proxy conflict | United States CJTF–OIR IMSC: United Kingdom; Saudi Arabia; Australia; United Arab Emirates; Bahrain; Albania; Kuwait; Qatar; Brunei Darussalam; Greece; Ireland; Thailand; Turkey; Supported by: Japan Israel; Egypt | Iran Popular Mobilization Forces: Kata'ib Hezbollah; League of Revolutionaries; Support: Houthis North Korea (political support) Russia (political support) PRC (political support) Syria (political support) Hezbollah (military support) | Inconclusive/Other Result: Conflict still ongoing with Australian Allies; Seizure of internationally flagged vessels by Iran in the Strait of Hormuz; Seizure of Iranian flagged vessel by UK at Gibraltar; 2019 Iranian shoot-down of American drone; Attack on the United States embassy in Baghdad by Iranian backed Popular Mobilization Forces; Killing of Iranian General Qasem Soleimani at Baghdad International airport | None | None | |

== See also ==
- Military history of Australia
- Australian military involvement in peacekeeping
