= Cattai Estate =

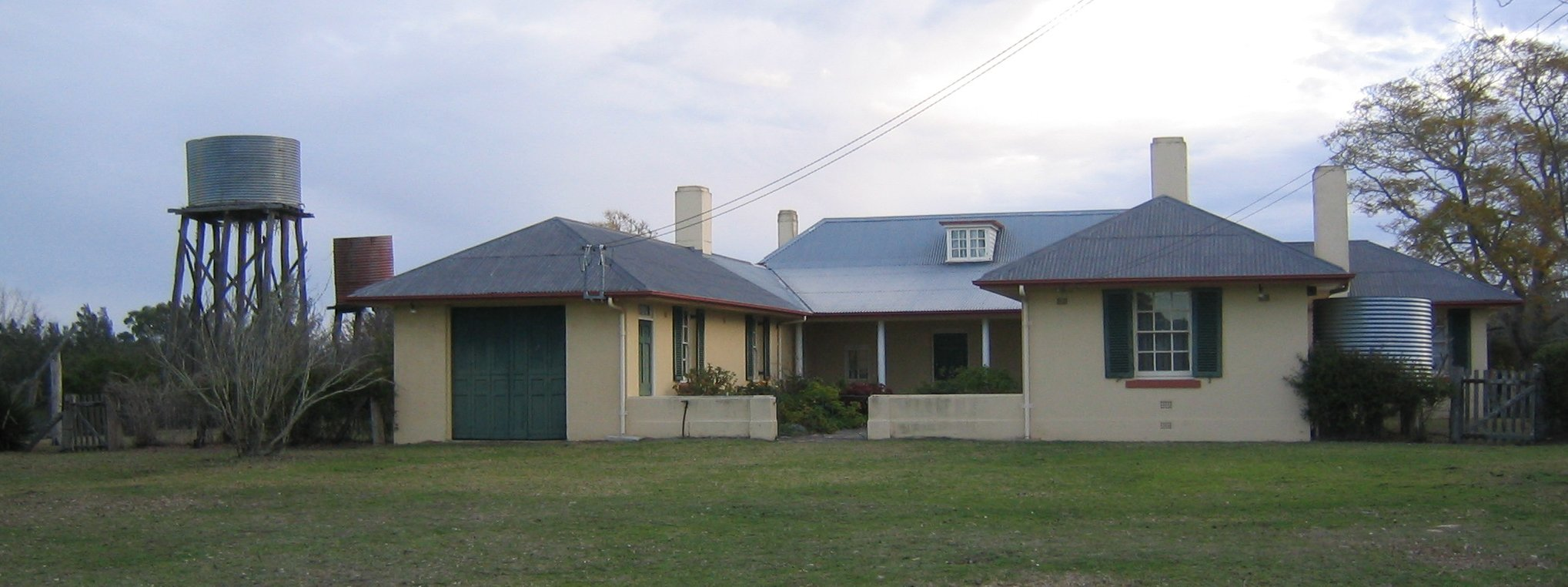
- Dr. Arndell's cottage in the Cattai National Park, part of the Cattai Estate, in July 2006.

- Location within New South Wales Location within Australia
- 33°32′56″S 150°54′00″E
- Location: Wisemans Ferry Road, Cattai, The Hills Shire, New South Wales, Australia

History
- Built: 1804–1821

Site notes
- Owner: Office of Environment and Heritage

New South Wales Heritage Register
- Official name: Cattai Estate; Caddai Estate; Cattai National Park; Caddie estate
- Type: State heritage (landscape)
- Designated: 2 April 1999
- Reference no.: 982
- Type: Historic Landscape
- Category: Landscape – Cultural

The Cattai Estate is a heritage-listed former farm and cultural landscape and now national park at Wisemans Ferry Road, Cattai, New South Wales, an outer suburb of Sydney, Australia. It was built from 1804 to 1821. It is also known as Caddai Estate, Cattai National Park and Caddie estate. The property is owned by Office of Environment and Heritage, an agency of the Government of New South Wales. It was added to the New South Wales State Heritage Register on 2 April 1999.

== History ==
=== Indigenous history ===
The original occupants of the area were the indigenous Darug people, whose area covered most of northern Sydney. The Darug, who certainly occupied the land 13,000 years ago and possibly as far back as 45,000 years had affiliations with a landscape that extended roughly from the coast to beyond the Hawkesbury River and from Broken Bay to as far south of Sydney as Campbelltown. Appreciating the Aboriginal "landscape" of the parks must be understood as being only a fragment of what was their real homelands.

=== Colonial history ===
The following timeline is relevant to the development of the Cattai Estate:

- 1753 – Thomas Arndell born in Herefordshire, England. He arrived in Australia on the first fleet as a surgeon on board the sailing ship Friendship.
- 1788 – Dr. Thomas Arndell was appointed as the chief medical officer of Parramatta Hospital, consisting of two long tent style structures with a thatched roof.
- 1789 – Governor Phillip explored the Hawkesbury River areas. Dr Thomas Arndell was a member of an exploration party that explored the area west of Parramatta and the Nepean River, shortly after Governor Phillip.
- 1793 – Sightings of aboriginal settlements and cultivation in the area noted by Governors Phillip and Hunter, who wrote "Banks of the Hawkesbury appeared to be ploughed from the practices of the Darug in harvesting of yams."
- 1794 – European settlement of the areas began, despite reservation by Governor Phillip of the threat of flooding in the region and the isolation of the area from Parramatta and Sydney. Arndell retired from Parramatta Hospital and was granted a pension of £50.00 a year to become a settler. He received a land grant of 25 hectares (61 acres) near Parramatta from Governor Phillip and later another 28 hectares (70 acres) from Lt. Governor Grose.
- 1795 – Soldiers sent into the area due to problems between the original indigenous occupants of the area, the Darug, and the colonial settlers over access to traditional hunting and fishing grounds during the Hawkesbury and Nepean Wars. Although no official figures have been located, it is apparent large numbers of aboriginal people were massacred and from this time onwards only limited sighting of indigenous population are reported.
- 1799 – Due to the high level of cultivation of cereal crops within the areas the government built log granaries along the river to store excess grain for the colony. The area around Cattai Farm also shows archaeological evidence of building footings.
- 1800 – Arndell had acquired 130 hectares (330 acres) north of Parramatta to cultivate wheat and maize crops, he was also granted seven convicts to help clear and work on the land.
- 1801 – Cornwallis government farm was established in the Hawkesbury area.
- 1804 – An additional land grant of 240 hectares (600 acres) was granted to Arndell; in the area now known as Cattai National Park, where the Cattai Creek and Hawkesbury River join. There are conflicting reports that Caddie may have been occupied as early as 1802.
- 1804 – Beginning of construction of mill and granary at Hope Farm (Considered to be the first industrial building in Australia). The farm was created to allow the second son to inherit property within the area. There is no viable evidence the mill was ever run on a commercial basis for supplying flour to the colony. Governor King announces the creation of six common grounds for public grazing to assist small landholders. One of these areas near Pitt Town later forms Michell Park.
- 1805 – House known as Macquarie Retreat built, later the home of Aboriginal missionary, Rev. Lancelot Threlkeld, who married Arndell's daughter, Sarah, on 8 October 1824.
- 1806 – Major flooding affected the Hawkesbury areas causing major damage to cereal crops, livestock, buildings and the lose of seven lives. Arndell and Samuel Marsden undertook a major survey into the flood and its subsequent effects, 1,493 residents sustained varying degrees of lose and the damage bill was estimated at £35, 248.00 a considerable sum for the small fledgling colony. Arndell now owed 250 hectares (630 acres) and as well as growing grain he was also rearing sheep and cattle on his land.
- 1810 – Over seventy-one percent of the arable land in the Cattai area was under cultivation. The importance of the area in supplying grain to the colony is evident when the government of the time referred to the area as "the granary of the colony".
- 1819–21 – The areas was considered to be one of the most highly populated regions in the colony.
- 1820 – Arndell begins construction of Caddie homestead, now situated within the Cattai National Park
- 1821 – The death of Arndell at the age of sixty-nine.
- 1850 – It appear the mill was abandoned along with the Granary, grain storage facilities and mill homestead, all appear to have fallen into disrepair by the early 1860s.
- 1863 – Catastrophe hits the area in the form of a rust blight that destroyed the entire crop for the year. Disease and the opening of new arable land in other parts of the state had a dramatic effect of the grain industry of the area and caused the reduction and eventual abandonment of grain crops.
- 1865 – Hope farm separated from Cattai Farm and the land was used mainly for the grazing of cattle.
- 1912 – Part of the property was sub leased for orchards, although these were later totally destroyed by flooding in the area in the 1930s.
- 1930 – One of Arndell's descendants, Thomas Gordon Arndell, used part of the property to grow fodder for dairy herd and won several awards for his inventive storage facilities. Flooding during the 1930s once more had a detrimental effect on the property and destroyed dairy and silo building. Also during this period the original Caddie homestead underwent major renovations under the supervision of architect Bruce Dellit, known for his colonial revival style. Funds for the alteration to the property were funded through the family's banking interest, not farming which was not longer considered viable. The remaining arable land was used for vegetable market gardens during the 1930s and supplied sweet corn to the American army during the Second World War.
- 1952 – The area was opened up for general recreational use; during the 1950s the area became a popular area from camping, bushwalking and picnics.
- 1958 – Michell Park became a recreational reserve, managed by the Department of Lands.
- 1981 – Caddie Park purchased from Mr. Tom Arndell by the Department of Planning and Environment, National Parks.
- 1983 – The park was opened to the public for recreational purposes.
- 1990 – Mitchell Park added to the Cattai state recreational area.
- 1992 – Hope Farm was added to the park to increase the amount of regional open space and the entire area was renamed as Cattai National Park.

== Description ==
The Cattai National Park is located on the site of the First Fleet land grant given to surgeon, Dr Thomas Arndell (1753–1821) in around 1804 and presently covers an area of 424 hectares (1,050 acres) and comprises three separate park areas:

1. Cattai Park at the junctions of Cattai Creek and the Hawkesbury Rivers is the largest of the three park areas and covers an area of 224 hectares (550 acres). The park has limited low impact camping grounds, barbecue areas, shelter sheds and open picnic areas along the banks of the Hawkesbury River. This area of the national park also contains The Cattai Farm area that was originally owned by Dr Thomas Arndell and the historic homestead Caddie that he began building shortly before his death in 1821.
2. Mitchell Park is located approximately 2.5 kilometres (1.6 mi) up stream from Cattai Park and covers 140 hectares (350 acres) and includes picnic and barbecue areas. Also available within the park are approximately 4 kilometres (2.5 mi) of walking tracks that were developed by the University of Western Sydney, Hawkesbury campus, and the NSW National Parks and Wildlife Services.
3. Hope Farm is the only area within the Cattai National Park not open to the public for recreational activities at present. The park covers an area of 60 hectares (150 acres) and is located on the northern side of Cattai Park. Hope Farm is the site of a derelict stone windmill, considered to be the first European built industrial building in Australia.

The Cattai Estate is home to a diverse range of plants and forms a natural habitat for many native and introduced animals. Thirteen plants within the park have been recognised as unique to the area and at least one plant has been listed for conservation due to its national importance. Cattai Park and Hope Farm contain a range of native trees including ironbarks (Eucalyptus paniculata), grey gums (E. punctata) and forest red gum (Eucalyptus tereticornis) indicative of the original species found in the area. This area of the national park also contains small areas of rare virgin bushland. (NPWS, 1997, Section 4.1.2.). Parts of Cattai and Mitchell Park also contain areas of wetlands that are home to large numbers of aquatic plants and birds that are unique to the Western Sydney ecosystem. Some remaining areas of the original Cumberland Plains have also been found within the national park and are home to rare vegetation that has been lost in other areas of Western Sydney due to agriculture and urban expansion that has occurred through the centuries since European settlement. Evidence of habitation of the original occupants of the area, the Darug can also be found throughout the park and twenty-seven sites of significance have been noted.

Cattai Park industrial sites

The Cattai Farm area features some significant industrial sites including historic grain silos and the ruins of a windmill believed to be the oldest industrial building surviving in NSW.

Cattai Park Arndell homestead precinct garden

The garden area surrounding the Arndell homestead has a cottage type garden with a remnant area of orchard/vegetable garden to the south with some fruit trees (peaches, plums). Trees around the house include jacaranda (J.mimosaefolia), kurrajong (Brachychiton populneum), Brazilian peppercorn tree (Schinus molle var. areira), crepe myrtle (Lagerstroemia indica), mulberry (Morus sp.), Queensland nut (Macadamia integrifolia), long-leaved privet (Ligustrum ovalifolium) and African olive (Olea europaea subsp. cuspidata) (both possibly from former hedges) and frangipani (Plumeria rubra). Shrubs include oleander (Nerium oleander), Cape plumbago (P.capensis), Syrian & Chinese hibiscus (H.syriacus cv. & H.rosa-sinensis cv.), geraniums (Pelargonium spp./cv.s), heavenly bamboo (Nandina domestica and its dwarf form, N.d.'Pygmaea'), Paris daisy (Euryops pectinatus), azaleas (Rhododendron indicum cv.s), Wisteria (W.sinensis), cotoneaster (C.sp. e.g. C.pannosus), Lady Bank's rose (Rosa banksiae cv.), Himalayan jasmine (Jasminium mesnyi), roses (Rosa cv.s) and ladder ferns (Blechnum sp.) and bulbs.

Cattai Park former orchard area (now picnic grounds area)

The floodplain below the Arndell homestead has today grass cover with scattered native and exotic tree species, predominantly river oaks (Casuarina cunninghamiana), honey locusts (Gleditsia triacanthos), Lombardy poplars (Populus nigra "Italica", black poplars (P.nigra), kurrajongs (Brachychiton populneum) and white cedars (Melia azederach var. australasica).

== Heritage listing ==
As at 4 May 2017, the Cattai National Park was a place of complexity and diversity that reflects the evolution of occupation, ownership and land management from Aboriginal occupation, through the contact and subsequent conflicts with European settlement of the earliest years of the nineteenth century to the late twentieth century recreational, environmental and educational values placed on this landscape. This comprehensive cultural landscape illustrates exploitation, manipulation and appreciation of the landscape and its various resources from the necessities of subsistence to today's management for, and orientation to cultural and natural values.

Hope Farm collectively with Caddie is of state significance as a representative of continuous settlement and farming activities by one family since the (European) settlement of the colony and the allocation of land grants along the Hawkesbury River in the early 1800s.

Hope Farm has state significance for its associations between European settlers and the historic Aboriginal tribe, the Dharug, who were the original inhabitants of the area. It also has state significance for its associations with Dr Thomas Arndell, a surgeon, magistrate and land holder, who formed part of the first medical staff that cared for convicts of the First Fleet.

The Hope Farm house complex is of local significance as it remains a key focal element of the early pastoral landscape of Hope Farm that exhibits characteristics typical to Cumberland Plain colonial landscapes and setting, which are becoming increasingly rare in the Sydney Region due to the pressure of modern urban development. The farm buildings themselves are amongst a declining number of rural groups surviving in the area. The surviving rural landscape has local significance due to its ability to demonstrate important aspects of early European occupation such as buildings, cultural plantings, early approach routes, fencing and some archaeological features and sites.

The Hope Farm homestead has aesthetic significance at a local level as a simple slab hut (with later alterations and additions), being an integral part of a larger cultural landscape that includes adjoining Cattai and Mitchell Parks. The homestead complex also retains some cultural plantings including the English oaks (Quercus robur) and crepe myrtles (Lagerstroemia indica) that add to the aesthetic quality of the landscape. The homestead also has aesthetic significance at a local level for its siting and high scenic quality being located along the Hawkesbury River. Windmill Tower before c. – c. 1809.

Cattai Estate was listed on the New South Wales State Heritage Register on 2 April 1999 having satisfied the following criteria.

The place is important in demonstrating the course, or pattern, of cultural or natural history in New South Wales.

Cattai and Mitchell Parks are of national cultural significance. Collectively they encompass a most substantial portion of an original First Fleet grant and an early Common that in the case of the former has been retained generally intact and which has evolved over two hundred years according to an array of external factors, personal tastes, needs and preferences. This complex cultural landscape reflects the broader regional patterns of the Hawkesbury as well as the individual specific aspirations and regional patterns of the Hawkesbury as well as he individual specific aspirations and achievements of one family. It documents an extensive variety of European activities achievements of one family. It documents an extensive variety of European activities (domestic, industrial, agricultural, pastoral, recreational and aesthetic refinements) and illustrates their evolution according to the several historic catalysts. With the extensive evidence of Aboriginal occupation also contained in the parks, including evocative evidence of the contact period, it is possible to illustrate and investigate many hundreds and possibly thousands of years of continuous occupation and cultural diversity.

The physical demonstration of these several "layers" of occupation is spread throughout the entire park and takes many forms, architectural features, relics, archaeological sites, changes, additions to or subtractions from the landscape. These "constructs" of culture are not the only evidence the environment. Areas of little or no change have been left for perceived or exploited the environment. Areas of little or no change have e been left for particular reasons which are as instructive of purpose and action as are the demonstrable changes and additions.

Most sites, places are relics display a high degree of integrity. They provide landmarks that identify the landscape as "old". Often they have a picturesque and evocative quality that reflects a nineteenth century appreciation of the landscape as well as appealing of twentieth century sensibilities. Individually the sites could be used to scientifically investigate or document various aspects of technological and/or cultural practices. The well defined history of the park makes such investigation particularly could be exploited and interpreted. This is true for both site specific questions and more general issues of history, culture and technology.

In addition to being valuable as individual sites, the Cattai and Mitchell Parks also serve as a diverse and well preserved collection of Aboriginal and European life at the time through the illustrations depicted in the tapestries.

The place is important in demonstrating aesthetic characteristics and/or a high degree of creative or technical achievement in New South Wales.

The natural systems of Cattai National Park are important as they include representative natural ecosystems of the Hawkesbury River floodplain and adjacent foothills on Hawkesbury sandstone and a range of rare elements which are significant at the regional, state and national level. While the vegetation communities of Cattai National Park are not Cumberland Plain Woodland, their location within this geographic area increases their significance because of the extent of clearing that has occurred on the Cumberland Plain generally.

The underlying geology and soils provide a representative demonstration of the interaction between older, eroded sandstone foothills and the more recent alluvial deposits. the Burralow Swamp soil landscape found at Reedy Swamp in Mitchell Park is of restricted distribution in the region.

Two plant communities, Sedgeland dominated by Knotweed and Paperbark Low Open-forest, are of significance as they are considered vulnerable to extinction in New South Wales. Several plant communities are of regional significance as they are of urbane expansion. These communities include Dry Rainforest, Forest Red gum Open-forest, and River Oak Open-forest. The Mitchell Park section includes an unusually diverse range of paint communities within a relatively small area.

Cattai National Park provides suitable habitat for one plant species of national conservation significance, Brasenia schreberi, and one plant species of regional significance, Whalebone Tree (Streblus brunonianus). The Park also provides habitat for a large number of plant species which are considered vulnerable in western Sydney.

The Park includes a diverse range of fauna habitats, including wetland habitats which are of restricted distribution in the region, and provides suitable habitat for many fauna species listed in Schedule 12 of the National Parks and Wildlife Act.

The Park also demonstrates the relationship between the underlying natural characteristics, stages of agricultural development in the area and subsequent regeneration following cessation of agricultural pursuits.

The place has a strong or special association with a particular community or cultural group in New South Wales for social, cultural or spiritual reasons.

Cattai National Park in its short history as a public recreation reserve has gained social value as an important recreational facility for the west and northwest of Sydney. It provides for many visitors throughout the year who are attracted to the Park by the sense of space and the connections that the park provides to the cultural and natural landscape.

The park has particular value for families providing as it offers a diverse and attractive range of cross generational interests that encompass historic, recreational, educational and environmental interests. This multi-dimensional aspect of the Park would appear to attract a good spectrum of visitors. The Park is also likely to have particular value to Aboriginal people.

As the west and northwest sector of Sydney continues to expand to its planned growth it can be anticipated that Cattai National Park will provide an increasingly sought-after recreational outlet. Consequently, it can be deemed that the Park is rapidly acquiring increasing social significance for the community within the region.

The place has potential to yield information that will contribute to an understanding of the cultural or natural history of New South Wales.

Cattai National Park includes a range of evidence of Aboriginal occupation, artistic expression (engravings), tool preparation (grinding grooves, ground and pecked areas in a shelter), stone manufacturing technology and use (stone artefacts some of which have been retouched and/or used), some food sources (apparent rich evidence of bone in one shelter deposit); contemporary albeit brief, of Aboriginal and European occupation (the engraving of the sailing ship and a possible glass artefact recorded during the survey of Caddie Park.

The significance of the Aboriginal archaeological evidence in Cattai National Park is very much limited by the fact that the archaeological evidence most likely to contribute to an understanding of the scientific significance has not been researched an cannot be assessed.

The overall significance of the Aboriginal sites appears to be that they are representative of sites at both the local and regional levels. Some specific sites are of higher significance within both the local and regional levels. The engraving of the sailing ship at SCRA 1 provides rare documentation of the arrival of Europeans by the Aboriginal inhabitants. The deposit at CSRA 9 has the potential to contain deposit which may date commencement of occupation in the area and a range of economic activity.

== See also ==
- Booloominbah
- Cattai National Park
- Hawkesbury and Nepean Wars
