= Booloominbah =

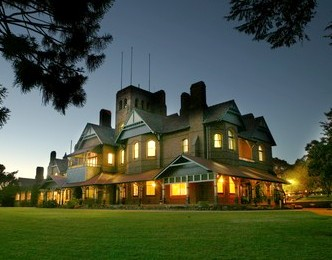
- Booloominbah at night

- Location within New South Wales Location within Australia
- 30.4883°S 151.6447°E
- Location: 60 Madgwick Drive, Armidale, Armidale Regional Council, New South Wales, Australia

History
- Built: 1884–1888

Site notes
- Architect: John Horbury Hunt
- Owner: University of New England

New South Wales Heritage Register
- Official name: Booloominbah; The Hill
- Type: state heritage (built)
- Designated: 8 November 2006
- Reference no.: 1768
- Type: Homestead building
- Category: Residential buildings (private)
- Builders: William Seabrook and John Thomas Brown.

Booloominbah is a heritage-listed mansion at 60 Madgwick Drive, Armidale, in the New England region of New South Wales, Australia. It was designed by John Horbury Hunt in the Federation Arts and Crafts style and built from 1884 to 1888 by William Seabrook and John Thomas Brown. Originally a private house for the pastoralist White family, it subsequently became the initial building of the New England University College, the predecessor of the University of New England. It continues to be owned by the university and is now used for university administration and as a cafe, bar and function venue. It was added to the New South Wales State Heritage Register on 8 November 2006.

== History ==
=== Indigenous history ===
Prior to European occupation the area was inhabited by the indigenous Nganaywanya, or Anaiwan, people. The Nganaywanya developed extensive trading networks with their neighbours, based on rich plant and animal resources. The area also provided a rich source of hard volcanic rock for tool making and ceremonial purposes.

After the arrival of Europeans to the Armidale area the Anaiwan people established a semi-permanent camp on Drummond's Hill. From here they established close ties to the large pastoral runs in the area, particularly with the White family. Oral histories indicate that Anaiwan people were employed at Booloominbah as domestic staff.

=== The White family ===
Frederick Robert White, born in 1835, was the fifth child of James and Sarah White, formerly of the Australian Agricultural Company and a highly successful pastoralist. Frederick White received the wool producing property "Timor" from his father's estate and began expanding the holdings. White married Sarah Amelia Arndell (b.1841), a descendant of First Fleet surgeon Thomas Arndell, in 1860. In the following year he borrowed money from a cousin to buy as second property, "Harben Vale", to the west of "Timor". White became a lay reader in the Murrurundi Church of England and was influential in appointing John Horbury Hunt to design the church of which he laid the foundation stone in 1873. White provided half of the funds necessary to build a second church at Blandford, also designed by Hunt and closer to "Harben Vale". He also had Hunt build a third church at Timor as well as stables for "Harben Vale".

During the 1860s and 1870s the White family worked together to strengthen their holdings by exchanging and sharing land and borrowing money from one another to purchase new properties, for Frederick these were in the Tablelands and included "Mihi Creek", later known as "Rockwood" east of Uralla. In 1877 White bought several small blocks outside of Armidale, possibly with the intention of moving his family there from the Upper Hunter. By then Frederick and Sarah had four sons and three daughters, having lost another three daughters. It was the loss of twin daughters and his mother that almost certainly convinced White to test the prevailing belief that the New England climate was better for the health. The decision to move the family to Armidale was cemented in 1880, when it was announced the new railway line would pass through the town. White bought another 22 blocks of land to the north-west of Armidale, today the campus of the University of New England. While White purchased the land in 1880 it was not until 1882 that the family moved to Armidale. A snap-shot of White's holdings in 1884 reveals he had 14,970 hectares (37,000 acres) at "Harben Vale" with 30,000 sheep and 8090 hectares (20,000 acres) at "Rookwood" with 17,800 sheep.

'The Hill' in Armidale was 160 hectares (400 acres), but was never large contributor to the family's income. The property later grew to 810 hectares (2000 acres) and with the construction of Booloominbah was renamed after the house.

The first plans for Booloominbah were completed in 1882 or early 1883 and revised before tenders were called for the construction in November 1883. The builders, Seabrook and Brown, met with White and Hunt on site in February and March 1884. The details of the contract reveal that Hunt was to direct the construction for a fee of (Pounds)6000, which was to be completed by January 1886. White seems to have changed his mind and decided to halt construction while he took his family to Great Britain and Europe for a year. White also altered the contract, stating that he would now provide all the glass and asked a third set of drawings be made. Seabrook and Brown requested that, despite the delay in full-scale construction, that they be allowed to quarry the stone and lay the foundations, which was probably agreed to. The family returned, apparently some time in 1885, as by Christmas 1886 building was well on its way and was nearly completed in 1887. Due to the extensive nature of the interior decorations, the family did not move in until 1888. Original plans for Booloominbah had included a service wing to the west, which was not constructed at the time, but major additions were built in the mid-1890s, some of which were supervised by Hunt.

Throughout the construction of Booloominbah, White continued to manage his four properties, often travelling to personally supervise them. During 1888 the White families at "Saumarez" and "Belltrees" worked together to run non-union shearers through the blockade. In 1891 eldest daughter Kate married Thomas Richmond Forster and Frederick bought Forster "Abington" and included him in the White family cooperative. Kate came back to Booloominbah to have each of her children, thus fulfilling the family's desire for a true family home.

In 1902 the youngest son turned 21 and White transferred ownership properties one to each son. White died in the following year, leaving an estate thought to be valued at £55,134. From this he gave substantial sums to the Armidale and Grafton Church of Christ diocese for building works, to be undertaken by Hunt. He also gave money for missions to New Guinea and Melanesia and to the Indigenous people of North Queensland. Hospitals in Armidale, Murrurundi, Muswellbrook, Sydney and the Prince Alfred Hospital also benefited.

Sarah White continued to live at Booloominbah for the remaining 30 years of her life. Between 1916 and 1919 Sarah turned over the service wing for the use of the Red Cross as a convalescent home for wounded World War I servicemen. In 1922 some of the land around Booloominbah was sold off and the remainder was leased as small farms. Sarah died in 1933, leaving the house to whichever of the grandchildren would buy it within 12 months. In the Great Depression, none of the children seem to have been in a position to purchase the property and it was discussed that perhaps the house would have to be sold for £6000.

=== University College and University ===
White, who had some formal education, obviously valued it for his children. He sent his sons to The King's School, Parramatta, and made extensive clauses in his will regarding the provision of education for his grandchildren, including university or higher education should they desire it. It is therefore fitting that son-in-law Thomas Forster proposed the house be donated to a fund established to create a university college in Armidale. The idea of a university in Armidale was first floated in 1922 as an extension of the schools already in existence. In the opening decades of the 20th century the traditional view of universities as only for the very wealthy was being challenged as academic state high schools exit exams became acceptable entry standard to university.

The drive for a university in Armidale was also driven by the New England New State Movement (NSM), a quasi-political organisation with links to the Country Party who wanted to form their own state, seeing very little similarity or shared interest with the Sydney-based government. When local member David Henry Drummond, who sympathised with the NSM, became the Minister for Education in 1927 he moved quickly to establish a teachers' college in Armidale. In 1934 Drummond suggested that if a sum of £10,000 could be raised the Government would be more willing to support a university college.

By 1936 very little headway had been made and it looked unlikely that such a sum could be raised. It was in this climate that Forster suggested that the donation of Booloominbah to the Government might force the issue. A secondary concern was the unwillingness of the University of Sydney to consider the proposal, funding was tight and it was only when they saw an opportunity to increase their budget that they were convinced. The sum was barely raised, the commercial and professionals of Armidale making very little contribution, leaving the efforts to the surrounding graziers. With that the Government rushed through amendments to the University Act in the last weeks of 1937.

Alterations were already planned before the confirmation had come through, they were quickly implemented and teaching began on 15 March 1938. Alterations to convert Booloominbah from a house into a university were reasonably extensive and included wiring for electricity, removal of walls in the kitchen and scullery to create a dining hall and the conversion of the laundry into a kitchen. The largest alteration was the construction of a flat for the warden, which required the demolition of the kitchens chimney, an integral part of Hunts design. Other smaller modifications were made, a door between the former morning and drawing rooms for example.

The first warden, Dr Edgar Booth, wanted to create a family atmosphere. In the first years all students lived in Booloominbah, its Lodge or Sub-lodge and everyone ate together in the dining hall. In later years, when the student population grew, townhouses had to be rented for the additional students, they still ate together in the dining hall, being picked up by bus at 8am in time for breakfast and then returned after dinner.

In 1945 there was 180 students attending the University College and a staff of twenty. The relationship with the University of Sydney was becoming increasingly strained, with constant calls for the college to become autonomous. Staff wanted the ability to approve students study paths and teach subjects specific to rural needs, agricultural and veterinary science, for example. In 1944 the college had drafted a bill in the hopes that the New South Wales government would give them autonomy. The University of Sydney agreed in May 1945 that they would work towards autonomy in seven years. The intervening World War II, political manoeuvring and more prevarication by Sydney University meant the University of New England did not come into existence until 1 February 1954.

The political arguments resulted in very little money for the college. As a result, student numbers remained low and Booloominbah retained its central role in the life of the college, only two other permanent buildings having been constructed. The library was the most rapidly expanding element of the college, it slowly expanded from room to room. In 1948 students protested when administrators decided to brighten up the building by painting the walls and skirtings white. The students were particularly distressed at the loss of the "scrolls, texts and decorations. They are unashamedly Victorian, we know, but Bool would be illogical with out them.". Around this time the roof tiles were replaced with no appreciation of the traditional English style they had contributed to.

Autonomy was not accompanied by a budget and new buildings were slow to come. It was not until the 1960s that students began to move out of Booloominbah and the building became mainly administrative. The building's new role brought a fresh round of modifications, the larger upper rooms were subdivided by thin wooden partitions, but care was taken to preserve the skirtings and ceiling mouldings. The idea of restoring Booloominbah was floated and some furniture in an appropriate style was bought for several of the rooms.

The construction of new buildings also affected the way in which Booloominbah was viewed by the student and staff population. The university became divided along faculty lines and moved into separate buildings, there was no longer large meetings of staff or students in Booloominbah. The building remained an important part of students' identification with the university and they respected the building. Students were concerned not to damage Booloominbah when they occupied it in 1972.

Booloominbah continues to function in an administrative capacity, most recently as a staff and student resource centre. Two grants have been received by UNE to undertake restoration work. In 1993 work was undertaken on the buildings exterior including fixing the roof, repointing the brickwork, repairing decorative elements like the gargoyles, painting woodwork and protecting the stained glass. In 2001 funding was approved to reinstate the painted decoration in the dining room.

=== Architect ===
John Horbury Hunt was born in Canada in 1838. Hunt trained under several architects in North America before the outbreak of the American Civil War in 1861 interrupted his studies. The war prompted Hunt to immigrate to India. Passing through Sydney in 1863, at the age of 24, acting colonial architect James Barnet convinced Hunt to stay in Australia. He joined the firm of Edmund Blacket and quickly proved himself, working mainly on country commissions. His strong personality and radical ideas had a profound effect on the firm. Hunt left Blacket in 1869 and entered a short-lived partnership before setting up his own practice. It had been his time at Blacket, however, that had introduced him to his clientele - the first Australian-born generation of entrepreneurs and professionals to access the power structure. It was also during this time that he met Reverend Canon William Edward White, during the construction of St Albans at Muswellbrook. White was impressed by Hunt and thus began the professional association with the extended White family. Hunt completed an impressive range of buildings for the White family, from the shearing shed at Belltrees to the grandeur of Kirkham and Booloominbah.

=== Interior designs ===
The interior design was executed and conceived by Andrew Wells of Lyon, Wells and Cottier. Wells trained and practiced in Glasgow, mainly working on steamship interiors until he came to Australia in 1887 in the hopes of improving his health. Wells had trained with Daniel Cottier, both of whom were influenced by the Gothic Revival style, although as Protestant Scots they moderated the style through the addition of Jacobean, Renaissance and Japanese influences in what became known as the London Style. Well's style was refined by his principle commissions, decorating the interiors of Glasgow-built steamers. These challenged and extended his style as, rather than purely painting on plaster, he had to transform sheet metal and wood panelling into inlaid timber and silk damask. His style was characterised by the colours he used and the delicacy of his line work. Wells ten-year stay in Australia improved his health to the extent that he was able to return to the United Kingdom and join the company of Guthrie Brothers, who became well known and respected in Europe (John Carr Architects).

=== Modifications and dates ===
- mid-1890s Addition of three-storey wing with service rooms on ground floor, servant's bedrooms on the first floor and a billiard room on the third. (Considerable)
- 1900–03 Addition of arched, flat-roofed tower to house water takes built to reduce water pressure problems
- 1938 Modification to fabric of building to allow university use. (Some)
- 1940 Removal of Kitchen chimney & external wall. (Considerable)
- 1948 Reroofing terracotta tiles and sprinkler system ( Considerable)
- 1952 Partitions erected (Little)
- 1964 Water tank and roofing replaced. (Some)

== Description ==
=== Landscape ===
Booloominbah sits in a landscape of an English country estate, including two drives, a gate and inner gate, a dam and a deer park below to its south. The main drive is flanked by a double avenue of English elm trees (Ulmus procera). The location of the second drive is marked by a section of remnant hedge.

The deer park and house are surrounded by a collation of mature trees including "English" (European) elm (Ulmus procera) and poplars (Populus spp.).

=== Gardens ===
Booloominbah is surrounded by three distinct gardens: the north, south and east. The northern garden is boarded by a hedge and is predominantly a lawn area. The garden is intersected by 1990s path. The gardens to the south and east are lawns interspersed with mature trees, including (to the south) a bunya pine (Araucaria bidwillii), Atlas cedar (Cedrus atlantica) and Chir/Himalayan pine (Pinus roxburghii).

A 1992 report indicated there was a rose garden located to the south of the house.

=== House ===
Booloominbah is probably the largest private house built in Australia in the 19th century. It is only the Vice-regal houses at Melbourne, Sydney and Hobart which are larger.

It boasts four reception rooms, billiards room, business room, smoking room, five principal, seven secondary bedrooms, two dressing rooms, boudoir, four bathrooms, lavatory, night and day nurseries, together with reception and stair halls on a considerable scale. As well there are two secondary staircases.

The house's design by Australian standards is extremely avant-garde and smart for its date of 1883–88. The artistic house made popular in England with teaching of William Morris and the Pre-Raphaelite Brotherhood was not built in Australia much before the 1890s, except perhaps in cases where fashionable clients had their houses designed in England, e.g. Alton (1882) in Victoria by J. P. Seddon, and Caerleon in N.S.W. (1887) by Maurice B. Adams.

The size and complexity of Booloominbah, offices for upper and lower servants, the male domain, numerous staircases (there are three) so that staff and family could pass unnoticed, private and public rooms as well as technological advances like mechanical bells, gas lighting, running water, plate glass and so on, owe their origin to the great country houses of England and the influence of texts like Robert Kerr's The English Gentleman's House, first published in 1864.

The style of the house owes much to the influence of the Arts and Crafts movement in England and, as the movement manifested itself in the United States, in the so-called American Shingle Style.

The roof is clad in terracotta tiles.

=== Stained glass ===
The house is elaborately finished with the extensive use of stained glass. Booloominbah contains more stained glass than any other house designed by Hunt, including "Kirkham" and indicates a particular aesthetic of Frederick and Sarah White. All the main reception rooms have stained glass, as does the day nursery. The main stair hall is dominated by a huge window celebrating the life of the martyr of Khartoum, General Charles George Gordon. This, by the English firm of Lavers, Barraud and Westlake, is the largest such window in a domestic setting in Australia. General Gordon distinguished himself during the Crimean War and the siege of Sevastopol and then again during the Taiping Rebellion in China. At the end of his service in China, Gordon returned to England and worked on defending the Thames at Gravesend. While there, he became interested in the plight of the working-class boys in the area and established a ragged school, as well as implementing other initiatives to improve their lives.

Gordon returned to the Crimea and through a series of events became the governor-general of the Sudan. He remained in this post for a number of years before relinquishing it due to his health. Gordon then accepted a number of short-term posts before being called on by the British to return to Sudan to quell the rising tensions in the region. Gordon disagreed with Britain on how best to deal with the situation and as a result was trapped in the city of Khartoum. The public rallied behind Gordon and entreated the British army to send him relief, but it arrived too late – the city had been captured and Gordon killed. His death was romanticised and he became a Victorian hero. Gordon's death in 1885 produced a swell of British loyalty in Australia. Troops were sent from NSW to Sudan to assist the British. When White was considering the subject for the window similar sentiments were arising in relation to the Boer War.

The choice of Gordon as the subject of the window was against the wishes of Hunt, whom White consulted. Sherry attributes White's choice to the importance he placed on leadership, given his position as a public figure in the Armidale community and his allegiance to the Empire. Discussing the stained glass in Booloominbah as a whole, Sherry (1991, p. 42) argues that it "expresses White's various allegiances: to the British tradition, the Empire, and Australia". As a whole, therefore, the stained glass expresses the White family's origins, allegiances and its values.

The stained glass in the main rooms was created by Lyon, Wells and Cottier. This firm was established by John Lyons in 1873 and originally known as Lyons and Cottier. Cottier was a pre-eminent stained glass artist in Glasgow under whom Lyons and Wells both trained. Lyon was granted permission to use Cottier's name, apparently his only contribution to the firm. The library is aptly decorated with images of Shakespeare and Scott, the image of Scott particularly appropriate given the influence his writings had over the construction of Victorian service and honour ethic. The drawing room displays a classical muse playing a lyre, surrounded by other artistic implements. In the dining room the windows depict English farming scenes as well as the four traditional meats - beef, venison, fish and game. The main bedroom window is an adaptation of the firm's most sought-after design, the Four Seasons. The Day Nursery is decorated with nursery rhyme images published between 1870 and 1881.

There is considerable use of Australian fauna and flora in the glass. The classical muse in the dining room incorporates native birds and animals, including bandicoot, possum and kangaroo. The Four Seasons in the main bedroom includes kookaburra, cockatoo, waratah and wattle. The twelve panels surrounding the door to the verandah are composed solely of native birds and flowers. This is a quite early use of Australian motifs and displays a range of skill levels in the execution, some being described by Sherry as "crude". Mitchell (1988, p. 27) explains this, stating that of the firms 106 sketches held by the Mitchell Library only five depict Australian themes and none of these are animals or flowers. The painting of Australian flora and fauna was therefore a "novelty" for the firm.

=== Interior decoration ===
While the stained glass was the primary means of decorating the interior spaces of Booloominbah, use was also made of painted decoration and furniture. These three decorative devices augment Hunt's characteristically restrained interior architectural design, in sharp contrast to his exteriors. An exception to this is the Stair Hall, which is an impressive arrangement, dominated by a large, gothic-style fireplace. The London style of decoration (a mix of Jacobean, Renaissance, Japanese and Gothic) favoured by Andrew Wells has been constrained in the decoration of Booloominbah, whether by the White family or Hunt is unclear. The interior paint scheme conformed to the prevailing fashion, similar to aestheticism and medieval styles through the use of mid tertiary colours (olive greens and dull reds) contrasted with chocolate and olive browns for the joinery and vellum and parchment for the ceilings.

Due to the size of Booloominbah the principle mode of painted decoration was discreet panels on the faces of archways and pilasters, for the main, with vases, birds, plants and flowers. The dining room, which has been restored, is one of the most elaborately decorated rooms. On a field of olive green for the walls and vellum for the ceiling Wells painted gold stars. In the buffet alcove the stars were replaced by deep olive green fleurs-de-Lys. The inglenook is the key architectural feature of the room and Wells has flanked it with two mythical lion-like creatures. The arch of the inglenook is decorated with a ribbon of text reading "Not Meat But Cheerfulness Makes The Feast", indicative of the Victorian morals espoused by the White family. Above the inglenook kookaburras and rosellas perch amongst vines on a gilt background. Andrew Wells unfamiliarity with Australian wildlife, he arrived in Australia in 1887, is evident in his depiction of the birds. Despite this Booloominbah is one of the best preserved examples of Andrew Wells ten year Australian career.

Booloominbah gains part of its State heritage significance from the synergy created by the combined efforts of Frederick and Sarah White, John Horbury Hunt and the decorating firm Lyon, Wells and Cottier.

=== Condition ===
The general physical condition of the property was reported as good as of 21 August 2006, with the external features in excellent condition.

Booloominbah remains physically intact and the basic fabric of the building remains. (Quinlan1998)

== Heritage listing ==
Booloominbah is of State heritage significance as one of the largest private country houses built in Australia during the 19th century and amongst the most avant-garde domestic Arts and Crafts style designs of the time. Designed as an interpretation of an English country house, Booloominbah sits in a relatively intact landscape. As such, it is exemplary of the work of architect John Horbury Hunt. As well as being large, it is also extravagant in decoration, in particular the use of stained glass. The fabric substantially demonstrates the wealth and influence of pastoralism in NSW in the late 19th century.

Its gift by Thomas R. Forster was the catalyst for the establishment of the New England University College, the first in Australia to be located outside of a capital city. The gift of such a substantial house demonstrates the historical circumstances of the White family's involvement, the impetus from the local church and community groups, and the "new state" movement in establishing Armidale as a major educational centre in NSW. (Clive Lucas Stapleton & Partners 1992)

Booloominbah was listed on the New South Wales State Heritage Register on 8 November 2006 having satisfied the following criteria.

The place is important in demonstrating the course, or pattern, of cultural or natural history in New South Wales.

Booloominbah is evidence of the state significant act of White family benevolence. The donation of the property enabled the establishment of a University College, which eventually led to the formation of the University of New England. While Booloominbah was donated by Frederick White's son-in-law, it is in keeping with his benevolence. White made substantial contributions to the construction of churches, all designed by Hunt, at Murrurundi, Blandford and Timor, as well as leaving sums of money to a wide range of charities on his death.

The donation of Booloominbah is of state significance through its association with a phase in NSW political history. Residents of the New England region were dissatisfied with their level of political representation and wanted to secede from NSW and form their own state. Called the New State Movement, it affected state politics from the 1920s until it was finally put to rest in the 1960s. Such was the pressure placed on the Government that three Royal Commissions (1923, 1929, 1934) were prepared to investigate the possibility. All found that any smaller state, centred on the New England region, could not be self-sufficient nor provide adequate infrastructure. Under the plans for the new state Armidale would become the educational centre and a university was seen as a prerequisite for statehood. While plans for a state of New England failed, pressure did begin the process of decentralising services, allowing a greater portion of the NSW population to access higher education. Booloominbah's conversion from a private residence into a University College building demonstrates the aspirations of the New State Movement.

The place has a strong or special association with a person, or group of persons, of importance of cultural or natural history of New South Wales's history.

Booloominbah is of state significance through its association with John Horbury Hunt (1838–1904). Hunt was a prolific and high-prolific architect in New South Wales who was sought after by wealthy professionals and pastoralists to design houses, as well as more utilitarian stables, woolsheds and other outbuildings. Hunt is perhaps best known for his ecclesiastical work, including several Cathedrals.

Hunt's showing at the Centennial International Exhibition, Melbourne in 1888 won him an honourable mention, evidence of his skill. His colleagues displayed their admiration of his work by electing him president of the Institute of Architects of New South Wales, of which he was a founding member. Hunt's confrontational attitudes to poor workmanship and professional conduct had previously forced him to resign from the institute. His hard work, dedication and energy convinced members to re-admit him in 1887, and he was elected president in 1889. As president, Hunt single-handedly wrote the necessary papers to formally incorporate the institute, and while he argued with most of his colleagues at one time or another, he was remembered as an active and effective president. Higher in the current consciousness is the public appreciation of the beauty he created.

Booloominbah is intimately associated with the White family, of significant influence in the pastoral industry throughout the Upper Hunter and Tablelands. White's brothers held the State Heritage Registered "Suaumarez" and the significant "Belltrees" property. While Fredrick Robert is not as well known as his brothers, he was no less successful.

The place is important in demonstrating aesthetic characteristics and/or a high degree of creative or technical achievement in New South Wales.

Booloominbah holds State aesthetic and technical heritage significance as one of the earliest and largest uses of domestic Arts and Crafts style in Australia. Plans for the house were drawn by John Horbury Hunt in 1883 and building was completed by 1888, 20 years before the style became widely popular. Booloominbah's architectural style is pre-dated by only a few houses, such as Alton (1882) in Victoria and Caerleon in NSW (1887), which were designed in England. It is therefore an early Australian-designed example of domestic Arts and Craft style.

Booloominbah possesses State aesthetic and technical heritage significance in the innovative manner in which Horbury Hunt adapted the country house form and Arts and Crafts style to Australia's climate. Hunt sympathetically incorporated verandahs, particularly evident on the southern elevation where the simple horizontal verandah provides ample shade in the summer, while contrasting with the vertical gabling of the roofline. Aesthetically the verandah adds to the State significance as the most ornately decorated example of Hunt's work, with a skirt of shingles and highly visible and beautifully executed wooden grotesques on the beam ends.

Booloominbah exhibits State aesthetic significance as a restored example of the collaborative efforts of owner, architect and decorating firm in displaying the wealth of the client. The house contains one of the largest collections of Pre-Raphaelite and early Australian flora and fauna motif stained glass. The centrepiece of the collection is what is commonly referred to as the Gordon Window. Located in the entrance hall, the window depicts seven scenes from the life of General Gordon, who became a Victorian hero during the Taiping Rebellion and Crimean War. The window was made by Lavers, Barraund and Westlake, a British firm and was probably commissioned in 1900–01. The remaining windows were supplied by Sydney firm of Lyon, Wells Cottier & Co. and were chosen to reflect the use of the room, English farming scenes and traditional meats in the dining room, for example. Andrew Wells, of the aforementioned firm, designed and painted the interior decoration and Booloominbah is an excellent example of his ten-year Australian career.

A second element of the building's State aesthetic significance is the northern elevation, which includes finely detailed brickwork consisting of a three-ring arch and four receding orders around a doorway of cathedral proportions. Detailed, carefully executed brickwork is a hallmark of Hunt's designs and attention during supervision of the construction. Hunt's interpretation of Norman Shaw's Old English style has created a winter display of intermingling light and shade through the use of recessed bays to connect three projecting gables.

The place has strong or special association with a particular community or cultural group in New South Wales for social, cultural or spiritual reasons.

Booloominbah possesses State social and cultural significance as it represents the public face of the University of New England. As such, it is a memorable feature of the campus for the thousands of students who have passed through the university. Student tradition still surrounds Booloominbah. It is said that the wisteria flowers signal the beginning of intense preparation time, but if students wait until the roses bloom, it is too late.

The place has potential to yield information that will contribute to an understanding of the cultural or natural history of New South Wales.

Booloominbah, as an early example of domestic Arts and Crafts style and in the adaptation of architectural styles to the Australian climate, is a State significant benchmark against which the development of these two aspects can be measured.

The place possesses uncommon, rare or endangered aspects of the cultural or natural history of New South Wales.

Booloominbah demonstrates State significant stained glass window designs, one of the earliest inclusions of native Australian flora and fauna.

Booloominbah is of outstanding significance to the State as the largest house designed by Horbury Hunt, eclipsing Kirkham.

The place is important in demonstrating the principal characteristics of a class of cultural or natural places/environments in New South Wales.

Booloominbah is part of a group which collectively illustrates the State significant architectural design of John Horbury Hunt, combined with a fine example of the Queen Anne style of interior decoration, exemplified by the recently restored dining room with inglenook.

Booloominbah is part of a group of houses that collectively demonstrates the White family's social and economic standing in the NSW community. As such it represents one of the best examples of a large domestic house by the pastoralist class in this country.

== See also ==
- Australian residential architectural styles
- Cattai Estate
