= Kalkadoon Wars =

Encounters between settlers and Aboriginal people in Queensland, Australia

The Kalkadoon Wars
Date	1870-1890
Location	Mount Isa region, western Queensland
Result	British victory

Belligerents
Queensland Native Mounted Police Force; (British Empire) British colonists	Kalkadoon people; Maithakari people

Casualties and losses
100 (est.)	900

The Kalkadoon Wars were a series of violent encounters between European colonists and the Kalkadoon people of Australia.

Europeans started settling in the Kalkadoons' homelands around 1860. At first relations were peaceful, but as numbers of new settlers increased, things became more hostile and the Kalkadoons eventually resorted to guerrilla warfare.

== Background ==
The first altercation between European colonists and Kalkatungu occurred in 1861 when three parties sent out to search for Burke and Wills, led respectively by John McKinlay, William Landsborough, and Frederick Walker, passed through the general area, and Walker, former commander of the Dawson native police, shot 12 natives dead, while wounding several more, just to the north east of Kalkatungu territory. Soon after in the early 1860s europeans started settling in the surrounding areas. Relations were said to me mostly peaceful at first, but as the number of new settlers increased, things became more hostile and the Kalkadoons eventually resorted to guerrilla warfare.

== Course of the wars ==
As the number of new settlers in the Mount Isa region increased dramatically in the 1870s, hostilities between the European colonists and Kalkadoons escalated resulting in a number mainly of drays being ambushed and stock harassment. When European incursions into Kalkadoon country continued unabated, the response changed.

In December 1878, a settler called Molvo and three of his stockmen were killed near Cloncurry, at the Wonomo watering hole on Suleiman Creek as they camped with their herd. It appears the permanent waterhole may have been a sacred site. Their cattle were all either killed or dispersed. According to the Kalkadoon people, this was the starting point of the conflict, for Alexander Kennedy and other settlers in the district joined forces with native troops under Inspector Eglinton stationed at Boulia to war down the native tribes of the region.

Soon after, Kalkatungu attacked the settlers at Stanbrook Station and Sulieman Creek. At Stanbrook the war party was driven off by a show of arms by the settlers. Police at Kennedy's Sulieman Creek homestead under Inspector Eglinton had anticipated the Kalkadoon attack and had organised a large force of troopers from Boulia to arrive before the Kalkadoons could launch a frontal assault on the homestead. As many as 300 warriors are said to have been slain in this one encounter. Subsequent to this incident, scores of Kalkatungu in the surrounding hills were shot down.

Over the following years, the Kalkatungu gained a reputation among graziers for tactical wiliness both in resisting police and settler forays against them, and in harvesting cattle found on their lands.

In the 1880s Kennedy went to Brisbane in an effort to get government support to fight the Kalkadoons that might guarantee greater immunity for people and property in the area. Although he was not officially backed, the first Queensland Commissioner of Police D. T. Seymour in charge of not only police but other paramilitary forces as well informally gave Kennedy his full support. It is said that Seymour had given Kennedy a blank cheque to war down the tribe and to have dispatched the aristocratic Marcus de la Poer Beresford, a nephew of the Marquess of Waterford, as new head of the Cloncurry native police unit to that end.

On 24 January 1883, Beresford camped with four of his troopers at Fullarton River in the McKinlay Range, while tracking down the Kalkadoon killers of a man called Britcher. After skirmishing with a group of Kalkatungu, they managed to corral a number, who appeared to give no resistance, into a gully nearby and post a guard over them for the night. Queensland historian Arthur Laurie suggests Beresford's error lay in "stupidly treat(ing) them like cattle". It is presumed that they had a stash of arms prepared for the occasion, and rose up, and killed Beresford and three of his men. One, though speared in his side, managed to escape and cover the distance, some 20 miles, to Farleigh station the following day.

For a year, the Kalkatungu managed to hold sway over their tribal lands, as both settlers and the police felt intimidated by their unbeaten territorial ascendancy. According to an anonymous person writing for the Queensland Figaro, nonetheless, sometime towards the end of 1883, the native police "wilfully murdered eight blackfellows and several gins" in the area.

In March 1884, Sir Thomas McIlwraith, a member of the Queensland Legislative Assembly and then former Premier of Queensland sent Frederic Charles Urquhart, a Sussex immigrant, employed in the Queensland Native Mounted Police Force to handle the crisis. The Kalkatungu are said to have directly challenged him to fight, ‘him to come out into the hills, and that they would finish him off like Beresford’, via a messenger called Mahoni. Urquhart, though based in Cloncurry, set up a forward camp 25 miles outside of the town, on the Corella River.

Urquhart was galvanised into action in August on hearing from a native boy, Jackie, who came in and reported that his employer James White Powell of Calton Hills, some 60 miles west of Cloncurry, at Mistake Creek, had been speared to death by local Kalkadoon and Maithakari people. Powell was a business partner of Kennedy's, and the latter, together with Urquhart and A.F. Mossman from White Hills station buried Powell, with Urquhart composing a poem vowing vengeance:

"Grimly the troopers stood around
that newly made forest grave
and to their eyes that fresh heap mound
for vengeance seemed to crave.

And one spoke out in deep stern tones
and raised his hand on high
For every one of these poor bones
a Kalkadoon shall die." (Note: The article, "Native Police", citing this poem "Powell's Revenge", appeared in the Queensland Figaro 15 November 1884 and continued: "it is bad enough to know that such a cursed stain on the country exists as a Native Police force; but it is diabolical to have its unhallowed work chronicled in idiotic rhyme" that "clothe brutality and cowardice with a mantle of glory and heroism".)

The group responsible was tracked down to a gorge, where they were feasting on the cattle, and most were mowed down. Over the next nine weeks, settlers and Urquhart's police tracked the Kalkadoons relentlessly in a war of retaliation, killing many. In September, a Chinese shepherd from H.Hopkins's Granada Station on the Dugald River was speared to death in the foothills of the Argylla Ranges, and it was rumoured he had been eaten by "cannibals".

=== Battle of Battle Mountain ===
Soon afterwards, an estimated 600 Kalkatungu warriors gathered on a rocky outlook to fend off the parties of well-armed settlers, the local constabulary and heavily armed and mounted native troopers. The site of Battle Mountain was chosen as it provided an excellent tactical advantage presented by the location, overlooking the plain below, the Kalkadoons had laid in large stocks of spears and boomerangs in advance for just such a siege. At one point the attackers under Urquhart tried a flanking movement, which caused the assembled Kalkatungu to charge straight down on them, only to be cut down in wave after wave of the withering fire of the muskets, called makini by the Kalkatungu. Urquhart also performed a cavalry charge. 200 Kalkatungu warriors are said to have died in this battle. Urquhart himself was knocked out, and this broke the back of organised resistance at a tribal level, and it was often touted that the Kalkatungu had been wiped out. The Europeans were ultimately victorious.

=== Aftermath ===
Urquhart and his troopers stayed in the area on continuous patrol killing more Aboriginal people for a further nine weeks following the battle of Battle Mountain.

== See also ==
- Australian frontier wars
- List of massacres of Indigenous Australians
- List of conflicts in Australia
- List of wars involving Australia

== Sources ==
- Chern'ee Sutton. "Kalkadoon history". cherneesutton.com.au.
- Reynolds, Henry (2006). The Other Side of the Frontier: Aboriginal Resistance to the European Invasion of Australia. University of New South Wales Press. ISBN 978-1-742-24049-7.
- Davidson, Iain (2016). "Ethnological Studies and Archaeology of North West Central Queensland". In McDougall, Russell; Davidson, Iain (eds.). The Roth Family, Anthropology, and Colonial Administration. Routledge. pp. 121–132. ISBN 978-1-315-41728-8.
- Drake, Jack (2012). The Wild West in Australia and America. Vol. 1. Boolarong Press. ISBN 978-1-921-92047-9.
- Lack, Clem (1959). Lack, Clem; Cilento, Raphael West (eds.). Triumph in the tropics: an historical sketch of Queensland. Smith & Paterson.
- Laurie, Arthur (23 October 1958). The Black War in Queensland (PDF). Royal Historical Society of Queensland.
- Richards, Jonathan (2008). The Secret War: A True History of Queensland's Native Police. University of Queensland Press. ISBN 978-0-702-23639-6.
- Towner, A. C. (1962). "An outline of the history of Western Queensland" (PDF). Journal of the Royal Historical Society of Queensland. 6 (4): 779–816.
