= Cattai National Park =

National park in Australia

- IUCN category II (national park)
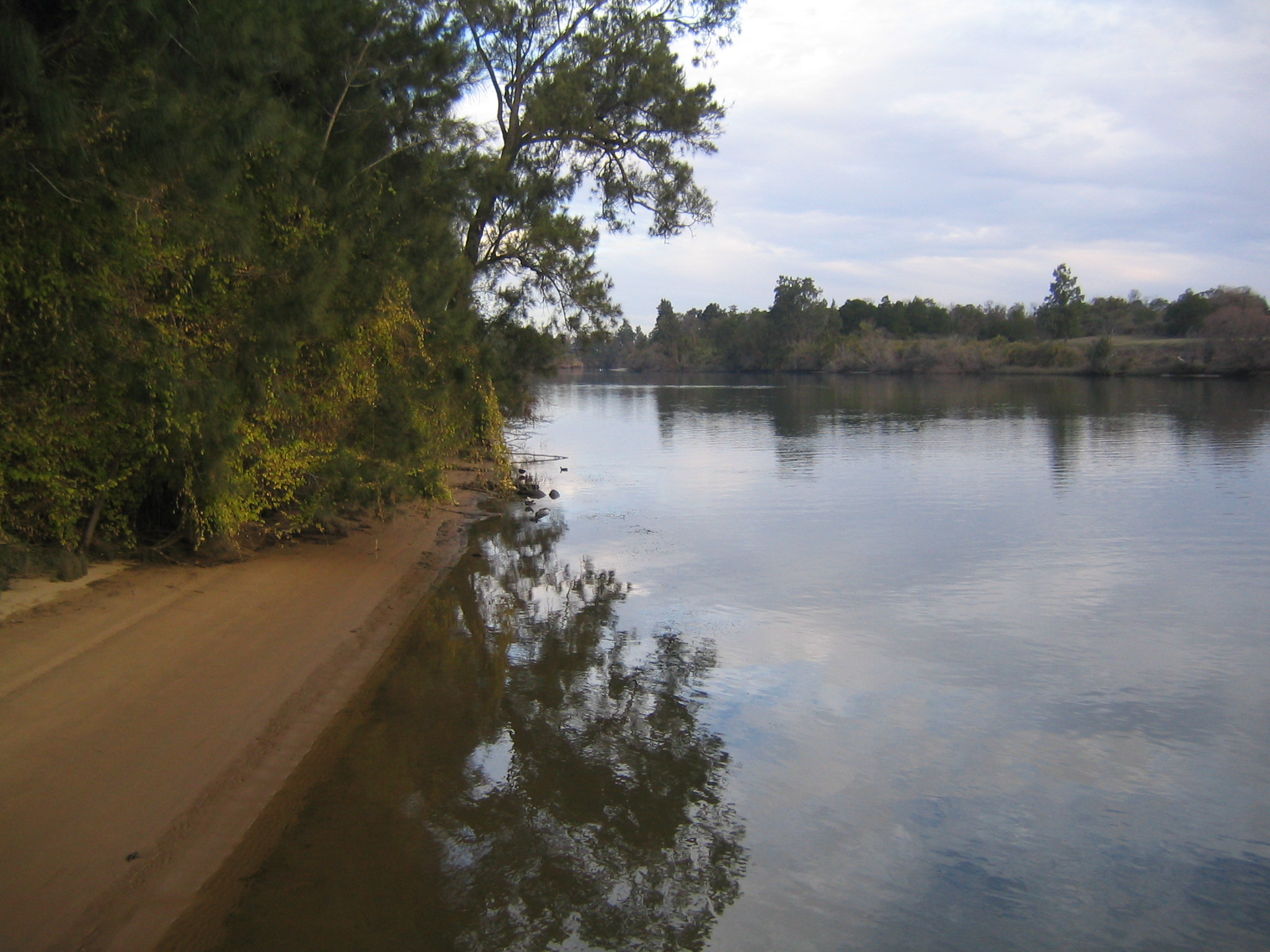
- Hawkesbury River viewed from Cattai Wharf

- Location within New South Wales
- Location: New South Wales
- Nearest city: Windsor
- Coordinates: 33°32′50″S 150°53′49″E
- Area: 4.24 km^{2} (1.64 sq mi)
- Established: 24 April 1992
- Governing body: NSW National Parks & Wildlife Service
- Website: http://www.nationalparks.nsw.gov.au/Cattai-National-Park

The Cattai National Park is a protected national park in the Hawkesbury region of Sydney, New South Wales, in eastern Australia. The 424-hectare (1,050-acre) national park is situated approximately 55 kilometres (34 mi) northwest of the Sydney central business district and approximately 13 km (8.1 mi) from Windsor. It includes Mitchell Park and Hope Farm.

== Location and features ==
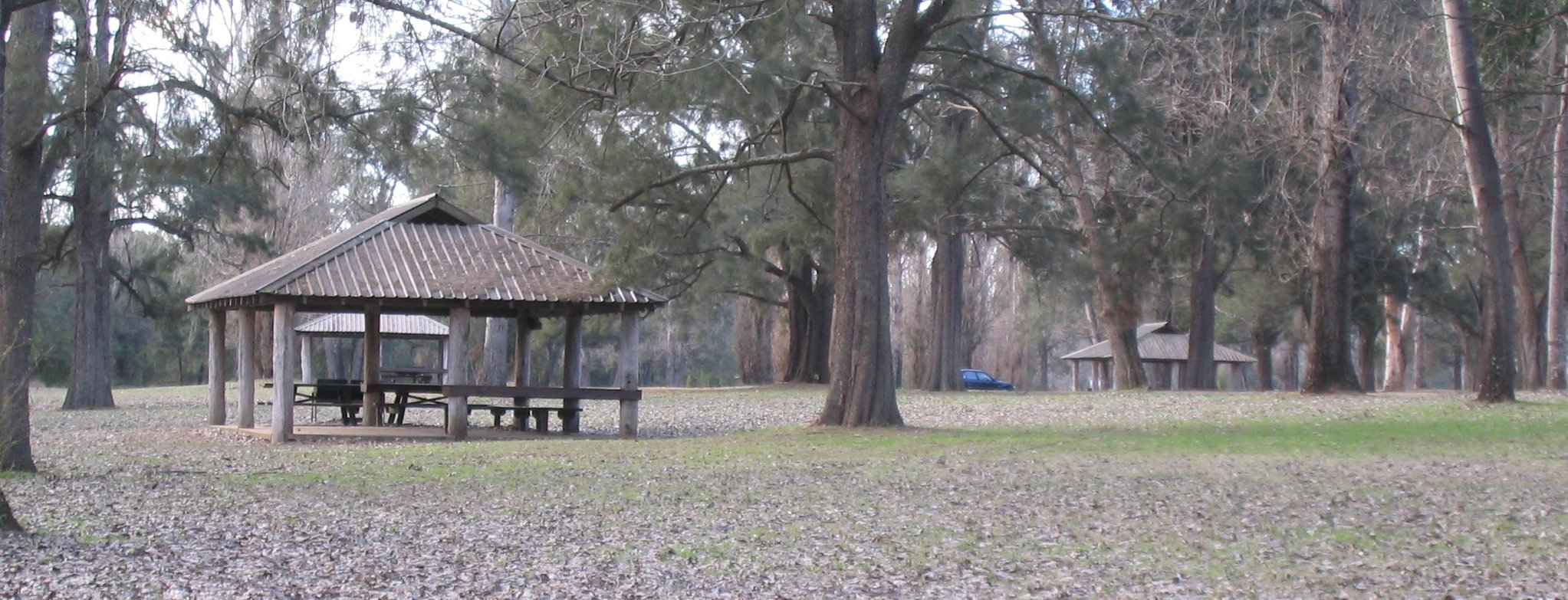
Cattai National Park picnic area

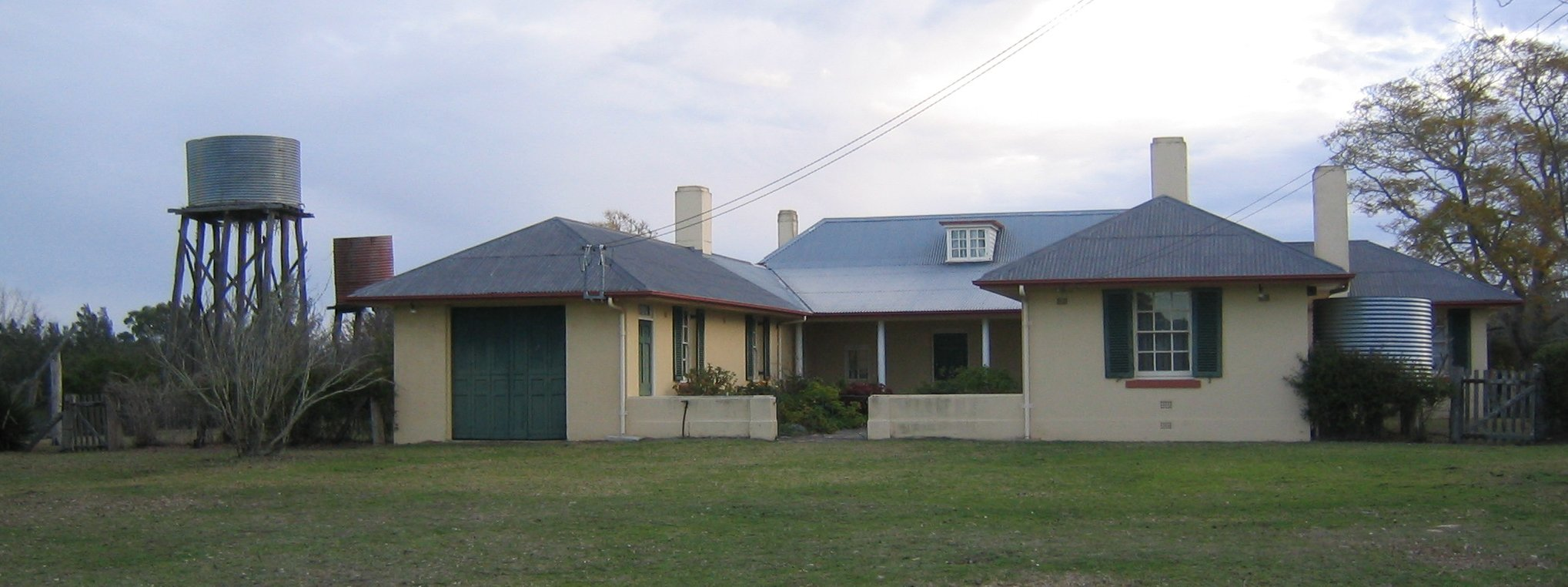
Thomas Arndell's cottage

The national park is situated on the Hawkesbury River and consists of three areas, Cattai Park at the junction of Cattai Creek and the Hawkesbury River, Hope Farm which adjoins Cattai Park to the north, and Mitchell Park approximately 2.5 km (1.6 mi) upstream along Cattai Creek.

Part of the national park was an original First Fleet grant and the park contains important historic and archaeological resources, including a homestead built in the 1820s, ruins of a stone windmill which is thought to be the oldest industrial building in Australia, convict-built dry stone walls, and a range of other features which reflect changes in the place since the early nineteenth century. The national park also contains a number of Aboriginal sites which are of importance to our understanding of the Cattai area prior to European settlement.

The Cattai Homestead, which was constructed around 1820, and its curtilage is listed by the National Trust and the Australian Heritage Commission. The Hope Farm Mill on Hope Farm, which is also listed on the Register of the National Estate, was probably constructed around 1806 and is believed to be the oldest industrial site in Australia. The park also features remnants of the Western Sydney Dry Rainforest.

== See also ==
- Protected areas of New South Wales
- Cattai, New South Wales
