= List of British Army regiments that served in Australia between 1810 and 1870 =

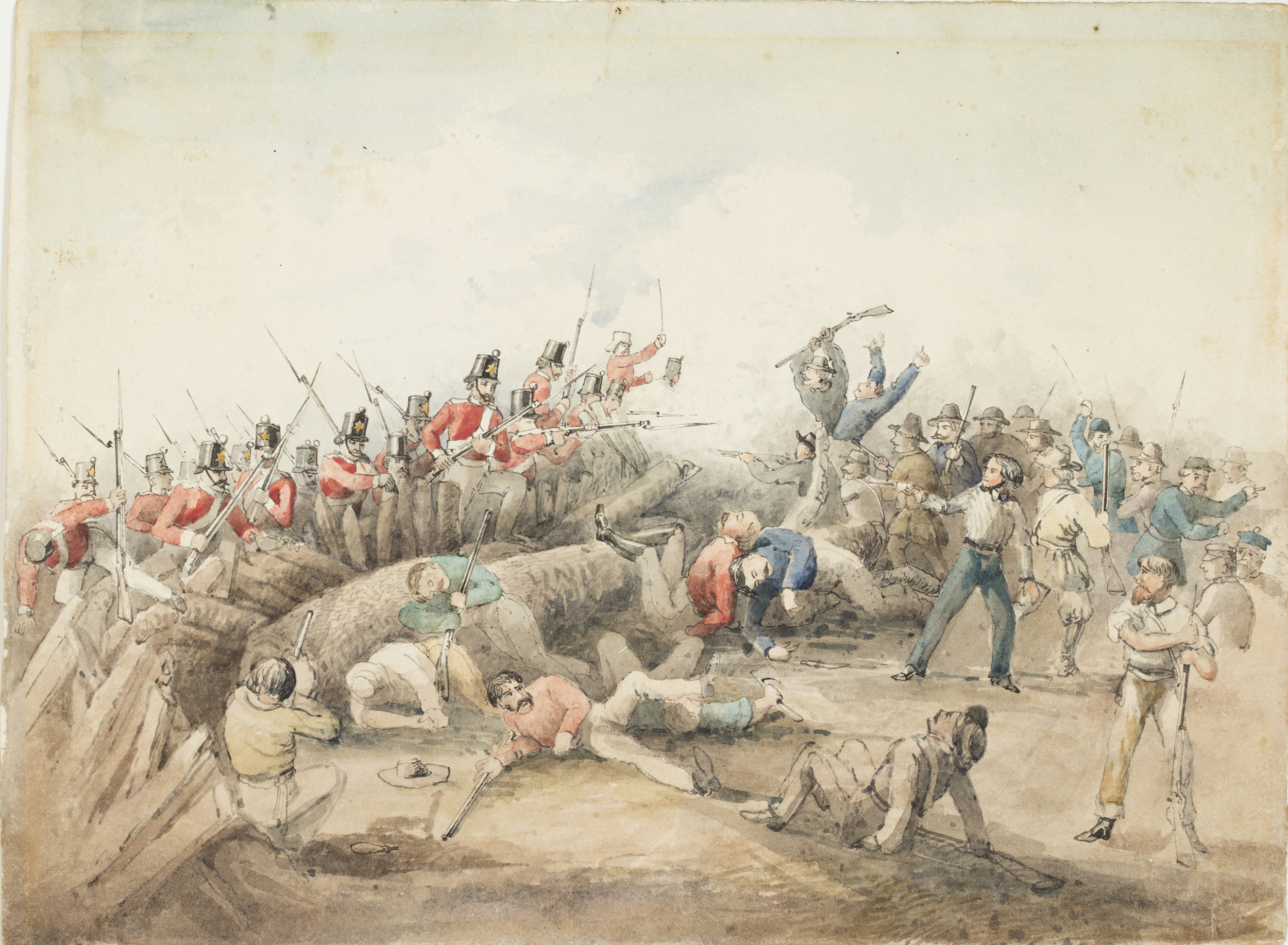
British soldiers storming the Eureka stockade in 1854

The following is a list of British Army regiments that served in Australia between 1810 and 1870. From 1788 to 1790, the colony was defended by Royal Marines. From 1790 to 1810 the colony was defended by the New South Wales Corps. From 1810 to 1870, the colony was defended by British Army regiments. The Royal Marines remained in Australia until 1913, after which the Royal Australian Navy was strong enough to take full responsibility for Australian waters.

After the arrival of the First Fleet in 1788, the colony of New South Wales was initially defended by a force of three companies of marines. In 1790 this force was relieved by a specially raised corps, known as the New South Wales Corps, which provided colonial defence until 1810 when they were returned to England following the events of the Rum Rebellion. After this, regular British Army regiments were dispatched to the Australian colonies on a rotational basis, to serve as a colonial garrison for the next 60 years. The first regiment to arrive was the 73rd, who were brought to colony to replace the New South Wales Corps by Lachlan Macquarie.

The size of these forces varied over time and they were dispersed over a number geographically diverse locations, including Van Diemen's Land (later known as Tasmania), Port Phillip District (later Victoria), the Swan River Colony (later known as Western Australia), South Australia, Moreton Bay and Cape York in what later became Queensland, and Melville Island and other places in modern-day Northern Territory. Initially the garrison was formed by only one regiment (battalion equivalent), however, in 1824 it rose to three. At its peak, in the 1840s, there were between four and six, although this fell to two in the early 1850s and then to one by the end of the decade. In the 1860s, British forces were limited to mainly garrison artillery, although a force of 15 companies of British infantry remained until 1870 when the last British regiment was withdrawn.

Ultimately, between 1810 and 1870 a total of 24 British Army infantry regiments served in Australia, along with detachments of the Royal Engineers and the Royal Artillery. (Note: Of these 24 regiments, two served second tours. As a result of this, some sources sometimes provide the figure of 26 regiments.) No cavalry units were deployed, although detachments of infantry served as ad hoc mounted units when required. Royal Marines were also sent a number of times. The length of each regiment's service varied, with the average being around seven years. Nevertheless, some regiments, such as the 73rd and 46th served as little as three or four years, while others such as 99th served a total of 13. Two regiments, the 40th and the 50th, served two tours. The last regiment to leave was the 18th, which served the shortest tour, under a year, leaving in 1870. They were not, however, the last British troops to leave Australia. The Royal Marines remained in Australia until 1913, serving on the ships of the Royal Navy's Australia Squadron, which was based in Sydney until the Royal Australian Navy was strong enough to take full responsibility for Australian waters.

While deployed, British Army regiments undertook a variety of duties. This included guarding convict settlements, hunting down bushrangers, suppressing armed resistance by Indigenous Australians, providing security on the goldfields, assisting local police to maintain public order, undertaking ceremonial duties and developing the nation's military defences.

== Regiments ==
Regimental designation	Arrived (Note: Between 1810 and 1840 British regiments were dispatched in waves, which arrived in Australia over a considerable period of time. As a result, sources vary as to the date that many regiments reached Australia.)	Departed	States served in (Note: Modern-day states are referred to here for ease of reader understanding.)	Notes
73rd Regiment of Foot)	1810	1814	New South Wales and Tasmania.	
46th (South Devonshire)	1814	1818	New South Wales and Tasmania.	
48th (Northamptonshire)	1817	1824	New South Wales and Tasmania.	
3rd (East Kent) – The Buffs	1823	1827	New South Wales, Victoria, Tasmania and Northern Territory.	
40th (2nd Somerset)	1824	1829	New South Wales, Victoria, Tasmania and Queensland.	Served two tours in Australia. Reputed to have "seen more action in Australia than any other regiment", it took part in the Black War in 1824. It later helped to put down the Eureka Rebellion in 1854.
40th (2nd Somerset)	1852	1860	New South Wales, Victoria, Tasmania and Queensland.	Served two tours in Australia. Reputed to have "seen more action in Australia than any other regiment", it took part in the Black War in 1824. It later helped to put down the Eureka Rebellion in 1854.
57th (West Middlesex)	1825	1832	New South Wales, Western Australia, Tasmania, Northern Territory, Victoria and Queensland.	
39th (Dorsetshire)	1827	1832	New South Wales, Western Australia and Tasmania.	
63rd (West Suffolk)	1829	1833	New South Wales, Western Australia and Tasmania.	
17th (Leicestershire)	1830	1836	New South Wales, Tasmania and Queensland.	
4th (King's Own)	1832	1837	New South Wales, Western Australia, Victoria and Tasmania.	
50th (West Kent)	1833	1841	New South Wales, Tasmania, Western Australia, and South Australia.	Served two tours in Australia.
50th (West Kent)	1866	1869	New South Wales, Tasmania, Western Australia, and South Australia.	Served two tours in Australia.
21st (Royal North British Fusiliers)	1833	1839	New South Wales, Western Australia and Tasmania.	
28th (North Gloucestershire)	1835	1842	New South Wales, Victoria and Queensland.	Sent to India after the First Anglo-Afghan War.
80th (Staffordshire Volunteers)	1837	1844	New South Wales, Victoria and South Australia.	
51st (2nd Yorkshire West Riding)	1838	1846	New South Wales, Western Australia and Tasmania.	
96th (Manchester)	1841	1848	New South Wales, Tasmania and South Australia.	
99th (Wiltshire)	1843	1856	New South Wales, Tasmania, Victoria, Queensland and Western Australia.	The longest serving regiment.
58th (Rutlandshire)	1844	1846	New South Wales.	Was sent to fight in New Zealand in 1845 before returning to Australia in 1846, remaining a further year until being sent back to New Zealand.
11th (North Devonshire)	1845	1857	New South Wales, Victoria and Tasmania.	
65th (2nd Yorkshire, North Riding)	1846	1849	New South Wales.	
12th (East Suffolk)	1854	1861	New South Wales, Victoria and Tasmania.	Took part in putting down the Eureka Rebellion in 1854.
77th (East Middlesex)	1857	1858	New South Wales.	Was dispatched to fight in India during the Indian Mutiny.
14th (Buckinghamshire)	1867	1869	New South Wales, Western Australia, Victoria and Tasmania.	
18th (Royal Irish)	1870	1870	New South Wales, Victoria and Tasmania.	

== See also ==
- Colonial forces of Australia

== Notes ==
Footnotes

Citations
