= Dural =

Dural may refer to:

- Dural, New South Wales, a semi-rural suburb of Sydney, New South Wales, Australia
- Duralumin or dural, an age-hardenable aluminium alloy
- Pertaining to dura mater
- Dural (Virtua Fighter), a character in Virtua Fighter
- Dural (surname), index of people with the surname Dural

== See also ==
- Dura (disambiguation)
