= Dubal (surname) =

Dubal is a surname. Notable people with the surname include:

- David Dubal, American pianist, teacher, author, lecturer, broadcaster and painter
- Dena Dubal, American neuroscientist
- Veena Dubal, American lawyer and scholar

== See also ==
- Dural (surname)
- Duval
