= Dural (surname) =

Dural is a surname. Notable people with the surname include:

- Travin Dural (born 1993), American football player
- Stanley Joseph Dural (1947–2016), American accordionist

== See also ==
- Dubal (surname)
- Duval
