= Cattai =

Suburb in Sydney, Australia

- Suburb
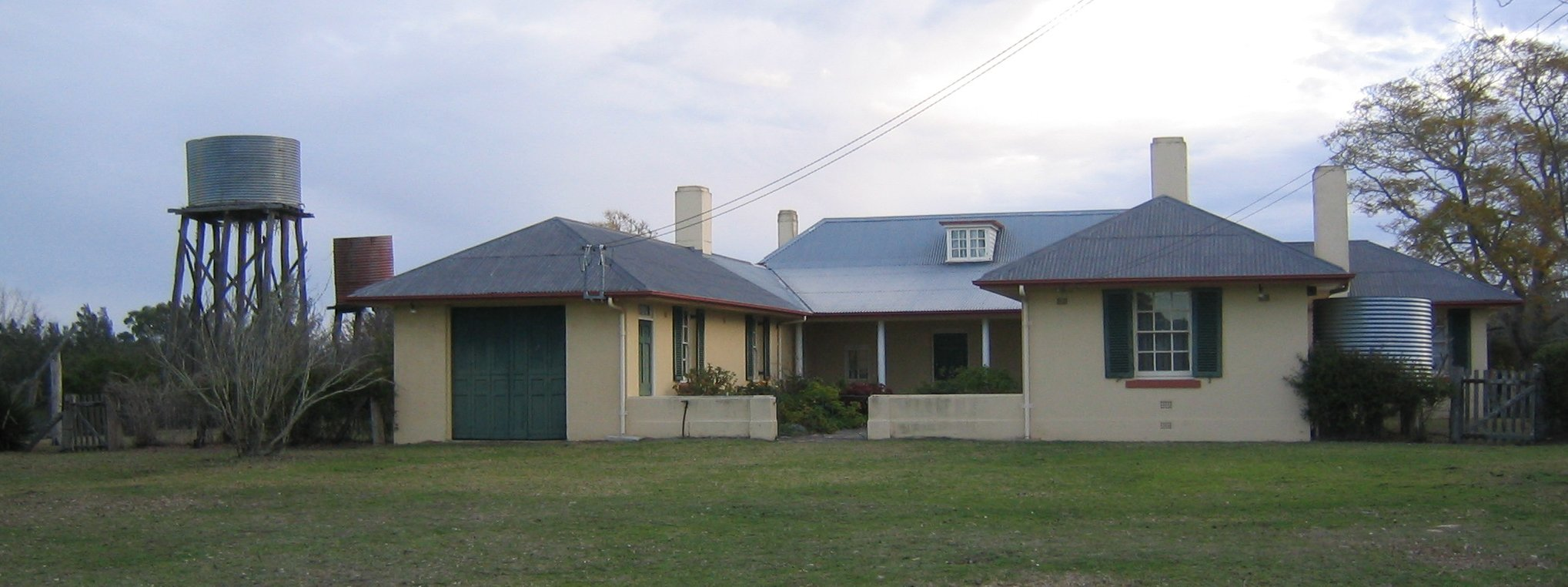
- Arndell's cottage

- Interactive map of Cattai
- Country: Australia
- State: New South Wales
- City: Sydney
- LGAs: The Hills Shire; City of Hawkesbury
- Location: 63 km (39 mi) north-west of Sydney CBD

Government
  - State electorate: Hawkesbury
  - Federal divisions: Macquarie; Berowra
- Elevation: 27 m (89 ft)

Population
  - Totals: 1,077 (2021 census); 790 (2016 census)
- Postcode: 2756
Suburbs around Cattai
Ebenezer	South Maroota	Canoelands
Wilberforce	Cattai	Glenorie
Pitt Town	Maraylya	Maraylya

Cattai is an historic suburb of Sydney, in the state of New South Wales, Australia. It is located 44 kilometres north-west of the Sydney central business district and 30 kilometres north-west of Parramatta. It is in the local government areas of The Hills Shire and City of Hawkesbury. Cattai's state electoral district is Hawkesbury, and its federal electoral divisions are Berowra and Macquarie.

Cattai is bounded in the north-west by the Hawkesbury River and is traversed by Cattai Creek. It encompasses the heritage-listed Cattai Estate, located within Cattai National Park at the junction of the Creek and the River. The Georgian house was built between 1804 and 1821 by former Magistrate Thomas Arndell, with further additions being made in the 1860s. Cattai is also home to a historic rural public primary school that was founded in 1886. The suburb was originally home to the Darug Indigenous Australians before being settled in the early nineteenth century.

== History ==
=== Indigenous Peoples ===
The locality of Cattai was the home of the Darug people who occupied a large expanse of Greater Western Sydney. The Darug people are thought to have occupied the locality of Cattai for more than 20,000 years.

The name Cattai was originally thought to have derived from an Aboriginal word with an unknown meaning. However, it was more likely named by the First Fleet Assistant Surgeon and Magistrate Thomas Arndell who built a homestead called 'Caddie'. The homestead is now called Cattai Estate and resides in Cattai National Park. The suburb of Cattai has henceforth been considered a misnomer of 'Caddie'.

=== Settlement ===
European settlers moved into the area in 1794 to sustain the food shortages of Sydney. Following protests by the Dharug people over the loss of their traditional hunting and fishing lands, soldiers were sent to the area in 1795.

Cattai Post Office opened on 26 November 1906 and closed in 1994.

Cattai Public School was established in 1886. Arndell Anglican College was an independent secondary college that was established in Cattai in 1990, until it moved to its current site of Oakville in 1994.

== Heritage listings ==
Cattai has a number of heritage-listed sites, the most notable being Cattai Estate on Wisemans Ferry Road.

== Demographics ==
=== Population ===
At the 2021 census, there were 1,077 people in Cattai. The median age was 40.

=== Culture and language ===
The majority of people from Cattai were born in Australia (85.0%). The most common responses for religion was no religion (31.0%), followed closely by Catholic (28.7%) and Anglican (21.2%).

The majority of people spoke only English at home (89.8%). The second most spoken language was Punjabi (0.9%) followed by Maltese and Croatian (both 0.7%).

=== Wealth ===
Cattai is an affluent suburb in the growing north-west of Sydney. The median weekly household income is A$2,878, which is 164.8% greater than the national average. In 2018, Cattai had a median house sale price of A$1.9 million. 47.3% of the households have an income greater than A$3,000 per week.

== Landmarks ==
=== Parks and sights ===
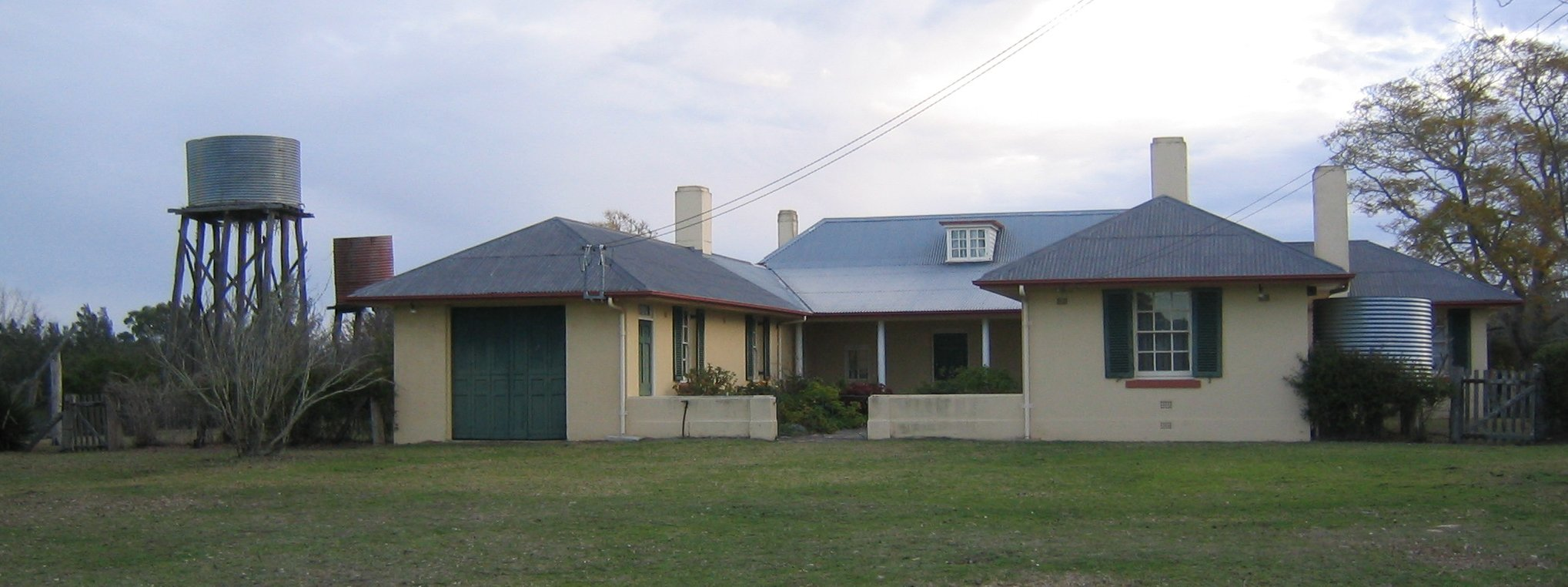
Arndell's cottage

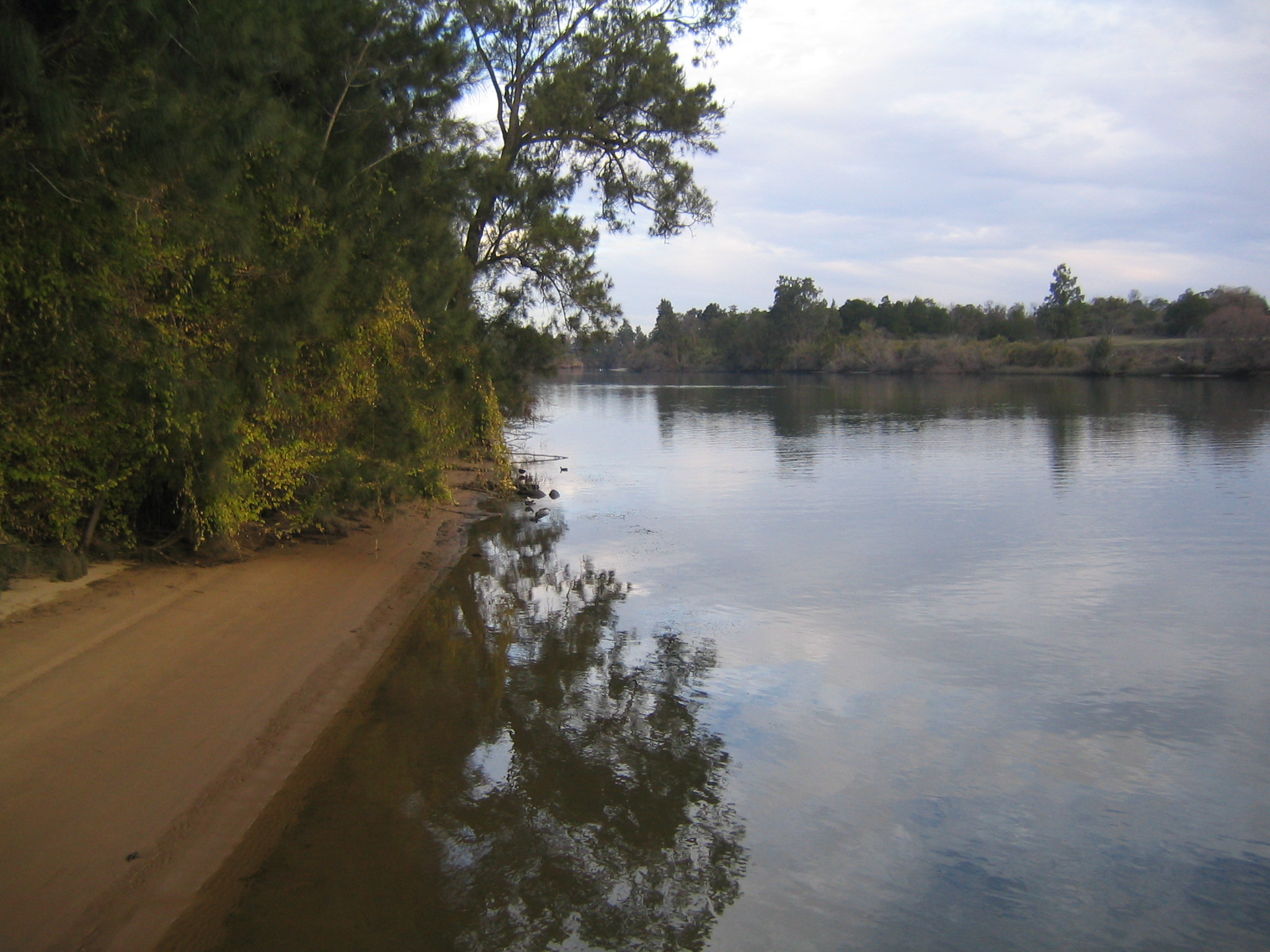
View from Cattai wharf

- Thomas Arndell's Cottage
- Cattai National Park
- Mitchell Park

=== Education facilities ===
- Cattai Public School is an historic rural school founded in 1886. Campus facilities:
  - 4 classrooms with interactive whiteboards
  - Computers, including a specialised computer room with access to the internet and classes that allow for more individualised tuition
  - School Library
  - 1 Administration Building
  - An upgraded playground with rubber-based Soft Fall and mini goal posts for student use
  - Sports oval, with complementary large grass areas
- Arndell Anglican College was originally established in 1990 at Threlkeld Drive, Cattai. It has since been relocated to Oakville, New South Wales. The school is of Anglican denomination.

=== Other ===
- Riverside Oaks Golf Resort
- Hawkesbury River
- Cattai Joinery

== See also ==
- Hawkesbury River
- Cattai National Park
- Climate of Sydney
