= Battle of Parramatta =

1797 battle of the Australian Frontier Wars

- Part of Hawkesbury and Nepean Wars
Date	21–22 March 1797
Location	Parramatta, New South Wales
Result	British victory, capture of Pemulwuy

Belligerents
Kingdom of Great Britain: (Kingdom of Great Britain) Colony of New South Wales	Bidjigal warriors

Commanders and leaders
Unknown	Pemulwuy

Units involved
(Kingdom of Great Britain) New South Wales Corps	

Strength
Unknown	100 (est.)

Casualties and losses
13 killed	30 killed (est.); Pemulwuy captured

The Battle of Parramatta was a battle of the Australian Frontier Wars which occurred at Parramatta in March 1797. In the conflict, Aboriginal resistance leader Pemulwuy led a group of Bidjigal warriors, estimated to be up to 100, against armed British settlers and soldiers of the New South Wales Corps. A number of British were wounded and killed, numerous Aboriginal people were killed with many others wounded. Pemulwuy himself was wounded and placed into custody.

== Conflict ==
In the mid 1790s, the region of the Burramattagal clan around Borromarree (what is now known as Oatlands and Carlingford just to the north-east of Parramatta), was opened up to British settlers in the form of 'land grants' by the occupying forces. This area was called the Northern Farms or the Northern Boundary by these settlers.

In early 1797, large groups of Aboriginal warriors led by Pemulwuy made a series of raids on the Northern Farms, commandeering food and provisions. During one of these actions in March, a male and a female settler were killed. The other Northern Farms settlers then decided to organise and arm themselves into a large band to track down and 'punish' the Aboriginal landholders. At dawn on a day in late March, these surprised about 100 Aborigines just outside Parramatta (probably at North Rocks), who subsequently fled. The pursuit continued through the morning toward Parramatta where the armed settlers decided to rest. One hour later, according to David Collins, "a large body of natives, headed by Pe-mul-wy, a riotous and troublesome savage" approached Parramatta.

The settlers were now joined by a contingent of British soldiers who were stationed at Parramatta. When they attempted to seize Pemulwuy, he threw a spear at a soldier prompting the government troops and settlers to open fire. Pemulwuy was shot seven times and was wounded. The Aboriginal warriors threw many spears, hitting a number of men. The difference in firepower was evident and five Aboriginal warriors were killed instantly, others died of wounds at a later date.

== Outcome ==
The Bidjigal suffered great losses and were forced to retreat. The soldiers took Pemulwuy to the hospital in Parramatta. He went in and out of consciousness for days and his death was thought to be imminent. Against expectations, Pemulwuy recovered and he escaped a few weeks later with his legcuffs still in place. After the Battle of Parramatta, Pemulwuy obtained the reputation amongst the Aboriginal people of being invincible to British firearms, and was thought to have been the main organiser of some subsequent raids on British farms to obtain food. However, Pemulwuy was later shot dead in 1802.

== See also ==
- Battle of Richmond Hill
