= Thomas Arndell =

English surgeon and Australian settler (1753–1821)

- Born: 4 March 1753; Kington, Herefordshire, England, United Kingdom
- Died: 2 May 1821 (aged 68); Cattal, New South Wales, Australia
- Occupations: Surgeon, magistrate, and farmer
- Years active: 1788–1820
- Spouse: Elizabeth Burleigh

Thomas Arndell (4 March 1753 – 2 May 1821) was a surgeon, magistrate, and farmer. He was born in England, but moved to Australia with the First Fleet when he was 35. He farmed many acres of land there, and he later became a magistrate. He organized flood relief during a flood which came to the area, and sided with Governor Bligh during the Rum Rebellion, temporarily losing his magistrate position after the event. He was married to Elizabeth Burleigh from 1807 until his death, and he had a total of 9 children throughout his life.

== Early life ==
Arndell was born on 4 March 1753, in Kington, Herefordshire, England, to his mother Elizabeth and his father Anthony. He was the youngest of the 11 children in the family. He was baptized at the Kington Parish Church.

== Career ==
In 1788, when Arndell was 35 years old, he sailed to Australia with the First Fleet as one of seven surgeons, on the Friendship. These surgeons, led by John White, acted as medical staff, who helped care for the convicts of the First Fleet. He was made in charge of the Parramatta hospital soon after arriving at Port Jackson, and began to nurture the land there in 1791. In July 1792, he requested to retire and become a settler, as he believed that he would have a better livelihood as a farmer. Arthur Phillip granted Arndell 60 acres of land to farm on around Parramatta. Arndell cleared 21 acres of land by October 1792; he was one of only three people who achieved this. The number of acres he owned increased to 630 by 1806, and 750 by 1807.

Arndell settled into the Hawkesbury district, where he was a magistrate and is where he stayed for most of the rest of his life. He continued to farm in the district, and became one of the most successful farmers of the time. He primarily focused on growing grains and raising sheep. He built the first flour-grinding windmill in the district. Arndell helped organize flood relief on 23 March 1806, when a flood came to Cattai, New South Wales, rising to 18 inches in the area. In the later years of his life, Arndell became the assistant surgeon in the district. During this time, William Bligh was the governor.

The Rum Rebellion started in 1808, which resulted in Bligh being overthrown. Arndell sided with the governor during this, and was his confidant throughout the event. Arndell was demoted from his magistracy, with Archibald Bell becoming the new magistrate of the area. However, Lachlan Macquarie, the next governor, was impressed by Arndell's loyalty, and succeeded in convincing the British government to have his position reinstated.

== Personal life ==
Arndell married Elizabeth Burleigh in 1807. Arndell and Burleigh had six children: William Arndell, Elizabeth Emily Gordon, Mary Louisa White, Sarah Threlkeld, James Arndell, and Frances Hannah Gunn. He also had eight children to two other women before leaving England to migrate to Australia on the First Fleet: seven to Susanna Simon, two of whom survived to adulthood, and another to an Italian opera singer, Delicia Isabella Francesca Foscari. He fathered 14 children in total, however only half survived to adulthood. He died on 2 May 1821, in Cattai, New South Wales. Elizabeth died 22 years later, on 31 January 1843. The two of them are buried at St. Matthew's Anglican Church, in Windsor, New South Wales.
