= Murruin Creek =

Coordinates: 34°16′S 150°04′E

Location
- Country: Australia

Physical characteristics
- Source
  - location: New South Wales

Murruin Creek is a river of the state of New South Wales in Australia. It is a tributary of the Wollondilly River and part of the Hawkesbury-Nepean catchment.

Its confluence with the Wollondilly is at the locality of Barrallier. It drops around 919m in its 28.3km length. It is notable for the high Calcium content and clarity of its water.

The high ground on its right bank, in its upper reaches, forms a part of the Great Divide watershed, the other side of which drains to the Abercrombie River. The high ground on its left bank, the Murruin Range, in its upper reaches, is also a watershed, the other side of which drains to the Kowmung River.

The ridge-line of the Murriun Range is a probable path that Francis Barrallier's expedition of November-December 1802 followed, in its quest to cross the mountains. It was later part of the Colong Stock Route between Oberon and Burragorang, which was used before the construction of Warragamba Dam. Part of the route still exists, as the Oberon-Colong Historic Stock Route, and is still in use the only vehicular route to the former mining town of Yerrannderie.

== See also ==
- List of rivers of Australia
