= Jooriland River =

Coordinates: 34°10′S 150°14′E

Jooriland Jooriland Creek (Part), Myanga Valley Creek (Part)

Location
- Country: Australia
- State: New South Wales
- Region: Sydney Basin (IBRA), Central Tablelands, Macarthur
- Local government area: Wollondilly

Physical characteristics
- Source: Bindook Highlands, Great Dividing Range
  - location: below Mount Egan
  - elevation: 556 m (1,824 ft)
- Mouth: confluence with the Wollondilly River
  - location: west of the Nattai Tableland upstream of Lake Burragorang
  - elevation: 122 m (400 ft)
- Length: 17.5 km (10.9 mi)

Basin features
- River system: Hawkesbury-Nepean catchment
- Tributaries
  - left: Green Creek (New South Wales)
- National park: Nattai National Park

The Jooriland River, a perennial river that is part of the Hawkesbury-Nepean catchment, is located in the Central Tablelands and Macarthur regions of New South Wales, Australia.

== Course and features ==
The Jooriland River rises in Bindook Highlands on the eastern slopes of the Great Dividing Range below Mount Egan west of the Yerranderie State Conservation Area, and flows in a meandering course generally east, joined by one minor tributary, before reaching its confluence with the Wollondilly River west of the Nattai Tableland upstream of Lake Burragorang. The river descends 434 metres (1,424 ft) over its 17.5-kilometre (10.9 mi) course.

In its lower reaches, the river adjoins the Nattai National Park, part of the Greater Blue Mountains Area World Heritage Site.

== See also ==
- List of rivers of Australia
- List of rivers of New South Wales (A–K)
- Rivers of New South Wales
