= Barrallier =

Barrallier may refer to:

- Francis Barrallier
- Barrallier Island
- Barrallier, New South Wales
