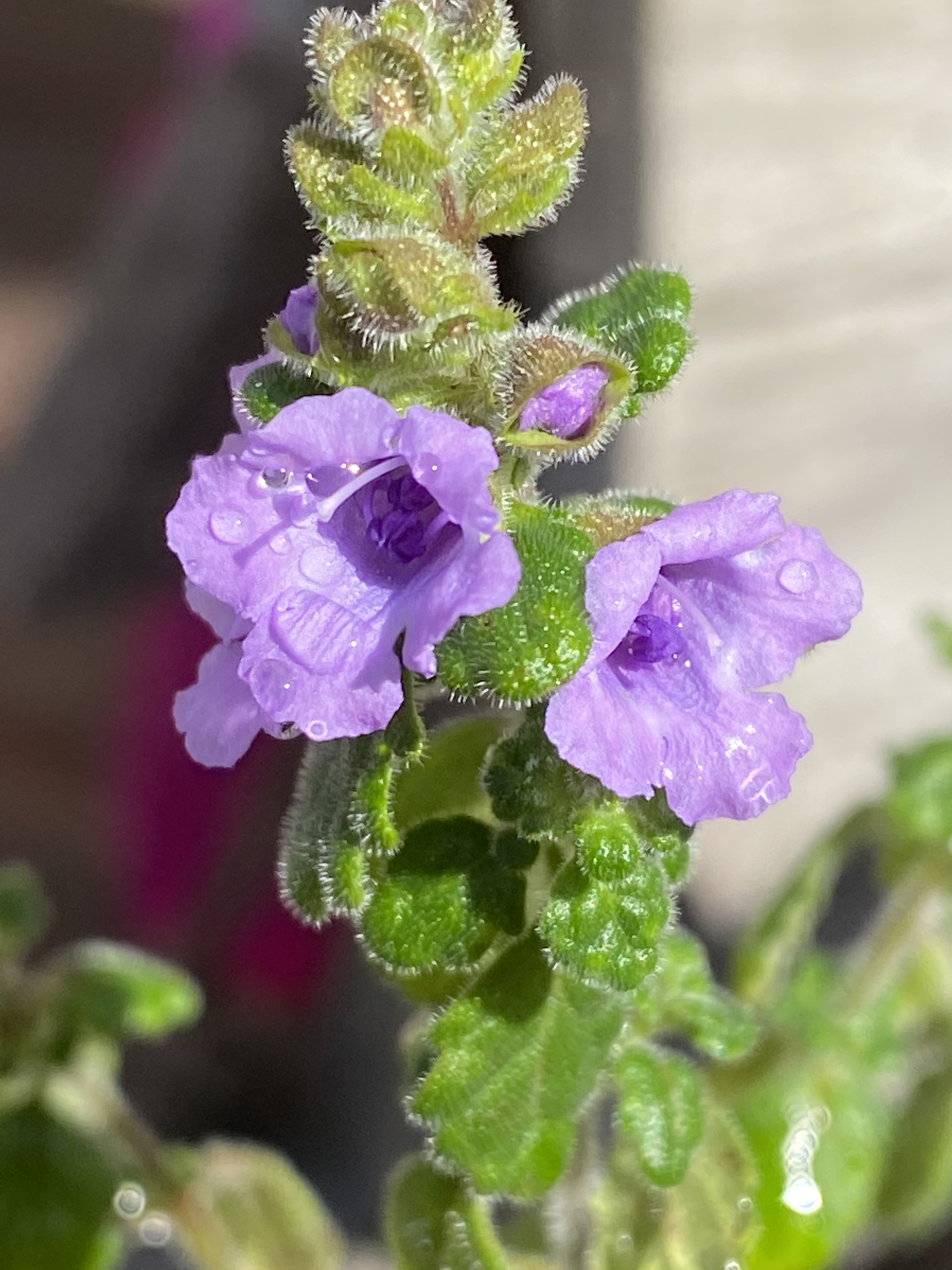
- Cultivated specimen

Scientific classification
- Kingdom: Plantae
- Clade: Tracheophytes
- Clade: Angiosperms
- Clade: Eudicots
- Clade: Asterids
- Order: Lamiales
- Family: Lamiaceae
- Genus: Prostanthera
- Species: P. incana

Binomial name
- Prostanthera incana A.Cunn. ex Benth.
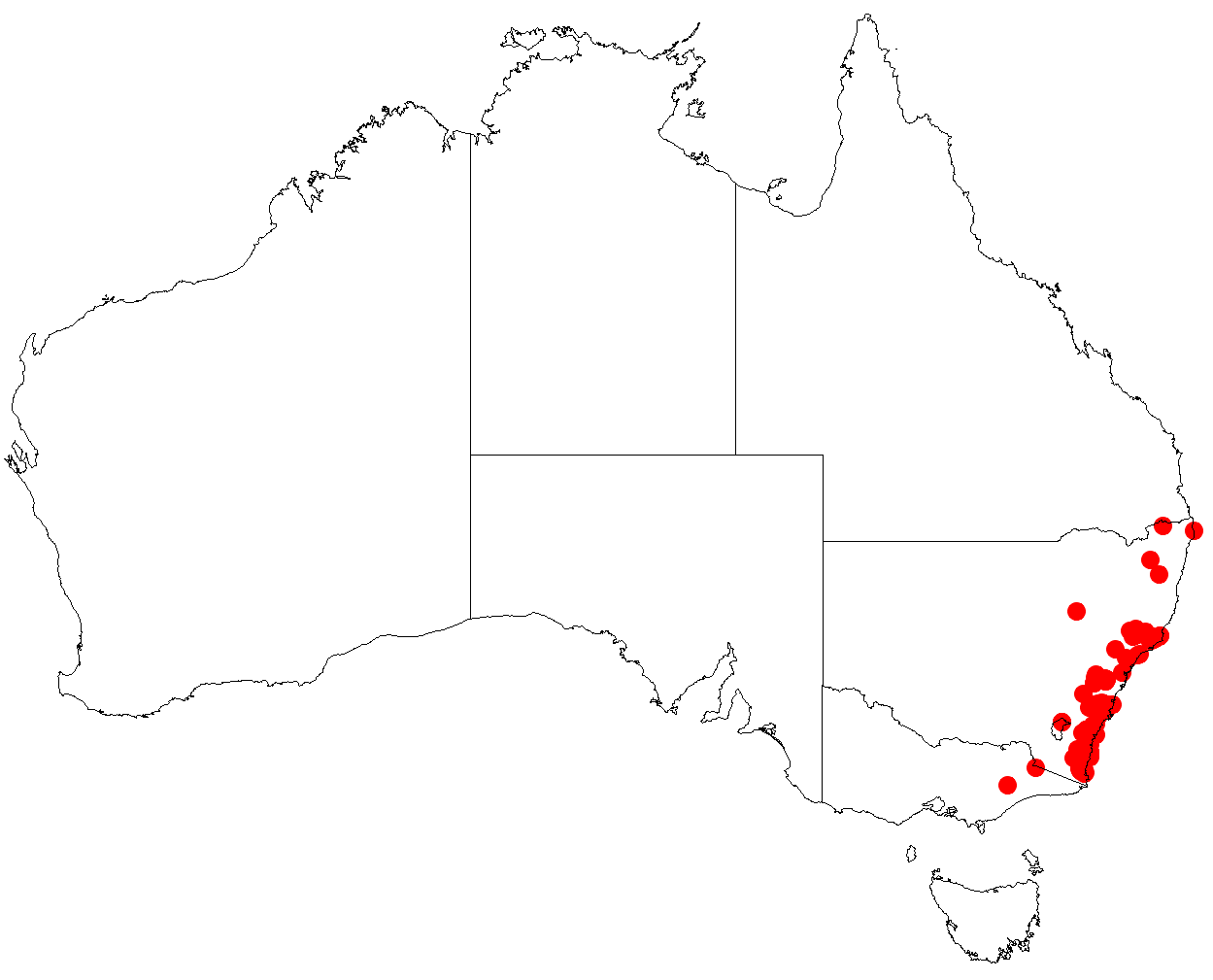
- Occurrence data from AVH

= Prostanthera incana =

Velvet mint-bush

Species of flowering plant

Prostanthera incana, commonly known as velvet mint-bush, is a species of flowering plant in the family Lamiaceae and is endemic to south-eastern continental Australia. It is an erect, moderately dense shrub with egg-shaped leaves, and lilac-coloured flowers, found mostly in near-coastal southern New South Wales.

== Description ==
Prostanthera incana is an erect, moderately dense shrub that typically grows to a height of 1–2.5 m (3 ft 3 in – 8 ft 2 in) and has hairy branchlets. The leaves are hairy, dull green above, paler below, egg-shaped with wavy edges, 9–18 mm (0.35–0.71 in) long and 6–13 mm (0.24–0.51 in) wide on a petiole 2–4 mm (0.079–0.157 in) long. The flowers are arranged in bunches near the ends of branchlets with bracteoles about 2–3 mm (0.079–0.118 in) long at the base. The sepals are 4–6 mm (0.16–0.24 in) long and form a tube 2–2.5 mm (0.079–0.098 in) long with two lobes, the upper lobe 2–3.5 mm (0.079–0.138 in) long. The petals are lilac-coloured and 8–10 mm (0.31–0.39 in) long. Flowering occurs from August to December.

== Taxonomy ==
Prostanthera incana was first formally described in 1834 by George Bentham from an unpublished description by Alan Cunningham, based on specimens collected by Charles Fraser in the Blue Mountains and by Cunningham near the junction of the Nepean and Warragamba Rivers. The description was published in Bentham's book, Labiatarum Genera et Species.

== Distribution and habitat ==
Velvet mint-bush grows in forest and woodland in shallow sandy soil in near-coastal New South Wales, south from Craven in the Hunter Valley. There is also a small population near Dargo in Victoria.
