= Nattai River =

Nattai
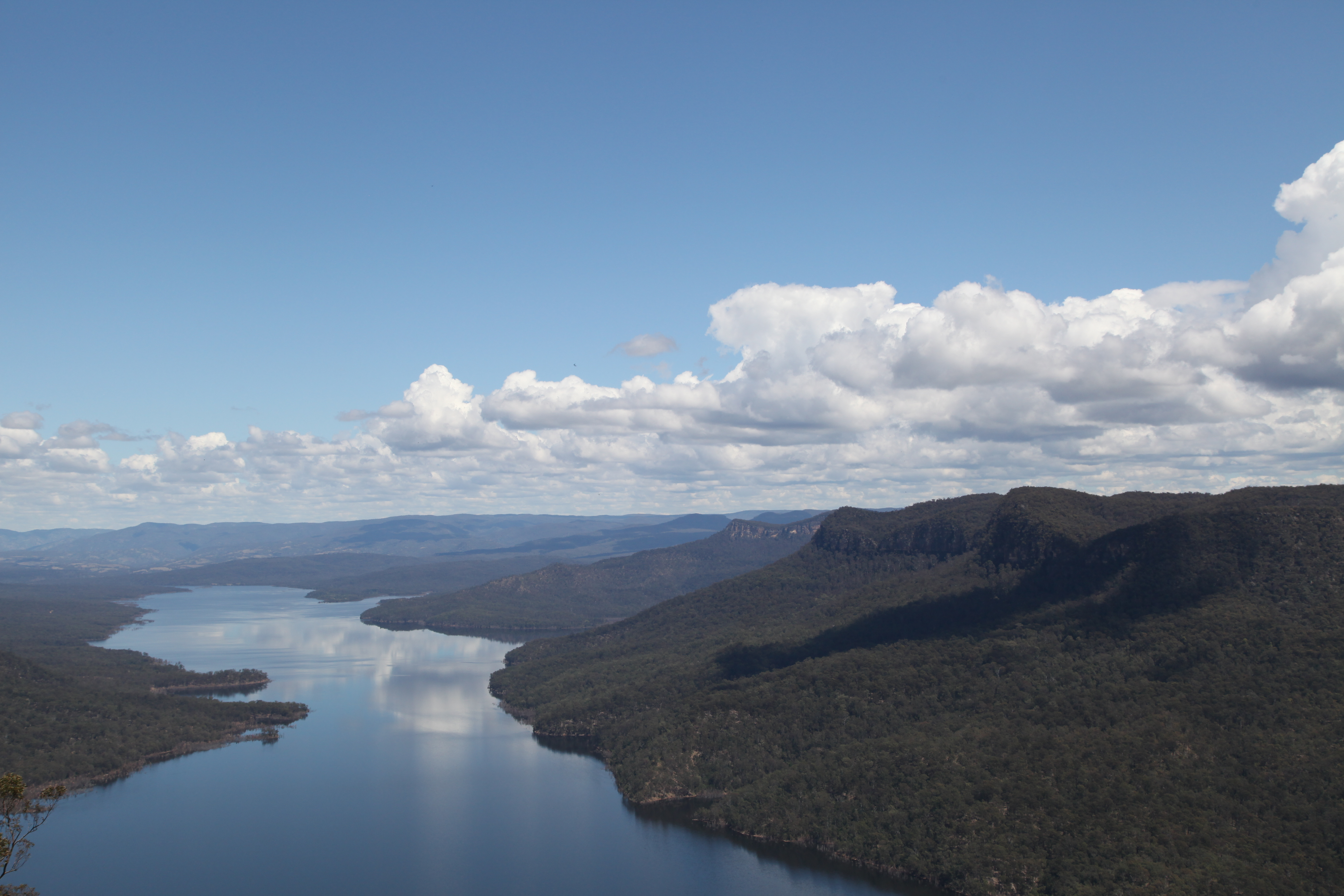
- An aerial photograph of the Nattai River to form Lake Burragorang, in 2012.

- Location of the Nattai River mouth in New South Wales

Location
- Country: Australia
- State: New South Wales
- Region: Sydney Basin (IBRA), Southern Highlands
- LGA: Wollondilly

Physical characteristics
- Source: Mittagong Range, Great Dividing Range
  - location: south of Mittagong
  - coordinates: 34°24′48″S 150°26′22″E
  - elevation: 452 m (1,483 ft)
- Mouth: confluence with the Wollondilly River to form Lake Burragorang
  - location: Nattai
  - coordinates: 34°5′2″S 150°25′21″E
  - elevation: 116 m (381 ft)
- Length: 51 km (32 mi)

Basin features
- River system: Hawkesbury-Nepean catchment
- Tributaries
  - left: Wanganderry Creek, Allum River
  - right: Rocky Waterholes Creek, Martins Creek (Wollondilly), Little River, Gillans Creek
- National park: Nattai National Park

The Nattai River, a perennial river that is part of the Hawkesbury-Nepean catchment, is located in the Southern Highlands region of New South Wales, Australia.

== Course and features ==
The Nattai River rises on the Mittagong Range within the Great Dividing Range, south of Mittagong, and flows generally north northwest and then north northeast, joined by nine tributaries including the Little River, before reaching its confluence with the Wollondilly River within Lake Burragorang southwest of the locality of Nattai. The river descends 336 metres (1,102 ft) over its 51-kilometre (32 mi) course.

The river flows through the Nattai National Park and is a source of water for the Sydney region.

== See also ==
- List of rivers of Australia
- List of rivers of New South Wales (L–Z)
- Rivers of New South Wales
