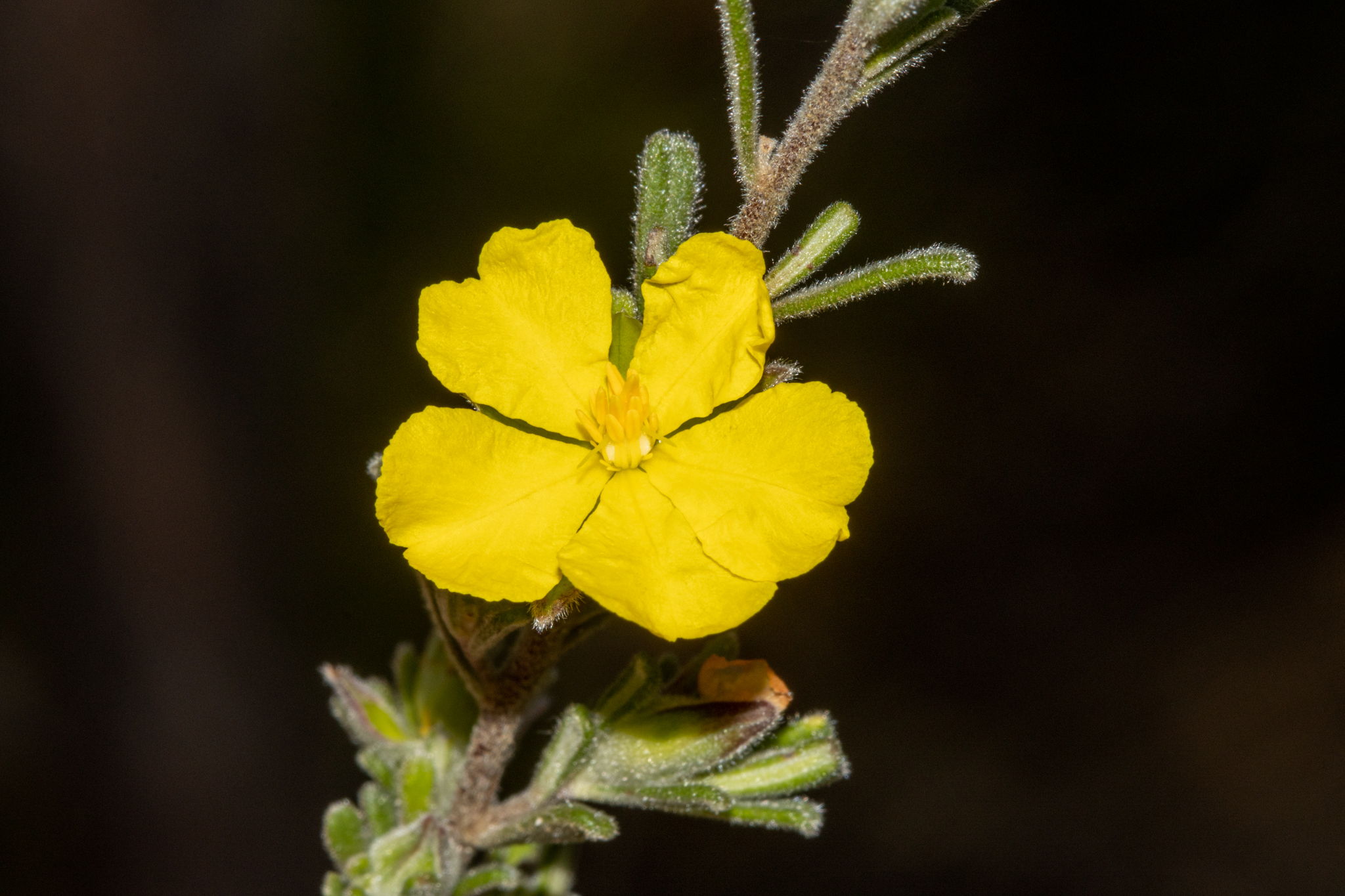

Scientific classification
- Kingdom: Plantae
- Clade: Tracheophytes
- Clade: Angiosperms
- Clade: Eudicots
- Order: Dilleniales
- Family: Dilleniaceae
- Genus: Hibbertia
- Species: H. planifolia

Binomial name
- Hibbertia planifolia Toelken

= Hibbertia planifolia =

Species of flowering plant

Hibbertia planifolia is a species of flowering plant in the family Dilleniaceae and is endemic to a restricted area of New South Wales. It is a small, prostrate shrub with triangular leaves with the narrower end towards the base, and yellow flowers arranged singly, with eight to eleven stamens and about the same number of staminodes arranged in groups around the two carpels.

== Description ==
Hibbertia planifolia is a small, prostrate shrub that typically grows to a height of up to 30 cm (12 in), with hairy branchlets. The leaves are triangular with the narrower end towards the base, 3.5–4.8 mm (0.14–0.19 in) long and 1.0–1.3 mm (0.039–0.051 in) wide and more or less sessile. The flowers are arranged singly, surrounded by clusters of leaves and are more or less sessile with linear to club-shaped bracts 5.4–5.6 mm (0.21–0.22 in) long and about 1 mm (0.039 in) wide. The five sepals are joined at the base, the outer lobes 5.3–5.6 mm (0.21–0.22 in) long and about 2.3–2.9 mm (0.091–0.114 in) wide, the inner lobes shorter but broader. The five petals are yellow, egg-shaped with the narrower end towards the base, 5.3–5.6 mm (0.21–0.22 in) long and there are between eight and eleven stamens and about as many staminodes arranged in groups around the two hairy carpels, each with two ovules. Flowering occurs from July to September.

== Taxonomy ==
Hibbertia planifolia was first formally described in 2012 by Hellmut R. Toelken in the Journal of the Adelaide Botanic Gardens from specimens collected by John L. Boorman near Yerranderie in 1915. The specific epithet (planifolia) means "flat-leaved".

== Distribution and habitat ==
This hibbertia is only known from two collections that were growing in scrub vegetation in rocky places on the Central Tablelands of New South Wales. The species has not been collected since 1967.

== See also ==
- List of Hibbertia species
