= Little River (Wollondilly) =

River in Australia

Coordinates: 34°11′S 150°28′E

Little Tomahawk Creek, The Little River, Unga Creek

Location
- Country: Australia
- State: New South Wales
- Region: Sydney Basin (IBRA), Southern Highlands
- Local government area: Wollondilly

Physical characteristics
- Source: Nattai Tableland
  - location: north of Hilltop, near Bargo
  - elevation: 602 m (1,975 ft)
- Mouth: confluence with the Nattai River
  - location: Nattai
  - elevation: 127 m (417 ft)
- Length: 27 km (17 mi)

Basin features
- River system: Hawkesbury-Nepean catchment
- National park: Nattai National Park

The Little River, a perennial river that is part of the Hawkesbury-Nepean catchment, is located in the Southern Highlands region of New South Wales, Australia.

== Course and features ==
The Little River rises north of the locality of Hilltop and west of the Hume Freeway near Bargo, and flows generally north northeast and then north northwest, before reaching its confluence with the Nattai River south of the locality of Nattai. The river descends 475 metres (1,558 ft) over its 27-kilometre (17 mi) course.

The river flows through the Nattai National Park and is a source of water for the Sydney region.

== See also ==
- List of rivers of New South Wales (L–Z)
- List of rivers of Australia
- Rivers of New South Wales
