= Warragamba River =

River in New South Wales, Australia

Coordinates: 33°52′S 150°37′E

Warragamba
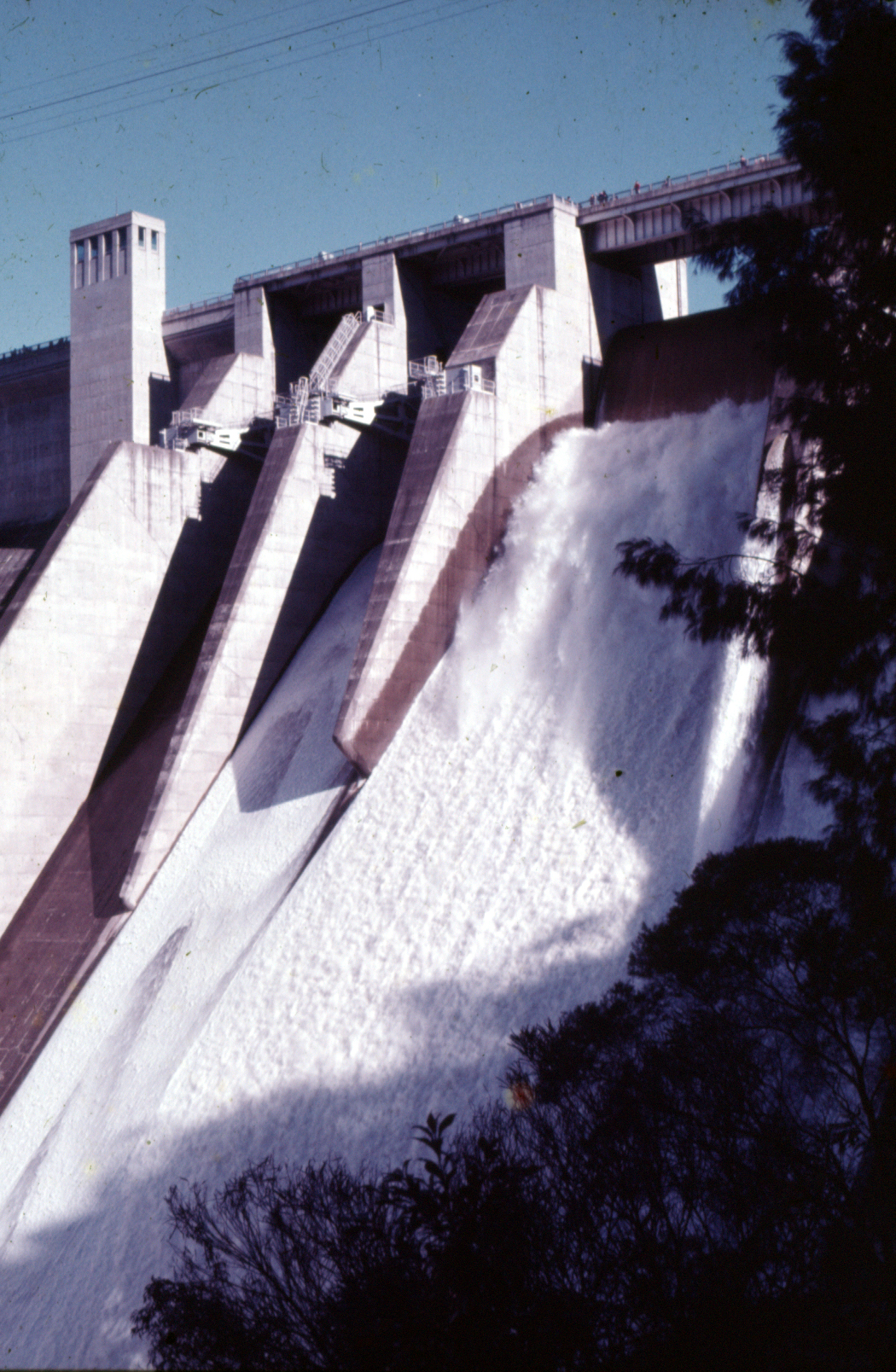
- Warragamba River flowing over the dam spillway, 1974

Location
- Country: Australia
- State: New South Wales
- Region: Sydney Basin (IBRA), Macarthur
- Local government area: Wollondilly

Physical characteristics
- Source: Coxs River
  - location: Lake Burragorang
  - elevation: 118 m (387 ft)
- Mouth: confluence with the Nepean River
  - location: Warragamba
  - elevation: 22 m (72 ft)
- Length: 18 km (11 mi)

Basin features
- River system: Hawkesbury-Nepean catchment
- Tributaries
  - left: Monkey Creek
  - right: Ripple Creek
- Dam: Warragamba Dam

The Warragamba River, a river that is part of the Hawkesbury-Nepean catchment, is located in the Macarthur region of New South Wales, Australia.

== Course and features ==
Formed through the confluence of the Coxs River and two minor tributaries, Warragamba River rises within Lake Burragorang and is the river on which Warragamba Dam is established, creating a large reservoir with total capacity of 2,031 gigalitres (7.17×10^{10} cu ft), that forms a major part of the water supply to greater metropolitan Sydney. The river descends 96 metres (315 ft), the majority of which is over the dam spillway, and then flows north into the Nepean River, north of the village of Warragamba, a course of approximately 18 kilometres (11 mi).

Prior to the creation of Lake Burragorang, the Warragamba River would have been formed by the confluences of the Coxs, Nattai, and Wollondilly rivers in the Burragorang Valley. Downstream, the river flowed through a gorge that varied in width from 300 metres (980 ft) to 600 metres (2,000 ft), and was 100 metres (330 ft) in depth. It was this configuration which allowed a relatively short but high dam wall in the gorge to impound a large quantity of water.

Today, the Burragorang Valley and most of the Warragamba River is submerged beneath the lake, and the remaining section of the river flows only the 3.5 kilometres (2.2 mi) north-east from the Warragamba Dam spillway to its confluence with the Nepean River.

The area surrounding Warragamba River is managed by Sydney Catchment Authority under the Sydney Water Catchment Management Act, 1998 (NSW) that defines special zones and places restrictions and controls on land use, development and access in order to safeguard potable water.

== Popular culture ==
- A popular phrase used throughout greater Sydney Australia is Warragamba Slammer. This refers to a glass of water, which is used in pubs and restaurants.

== See also ==
- List of rivers of New South Wales (L–Z)
- List of rivers of Australia
- Rivers of New South Wales
- Warragamba Dam
