= Nattai National Park =

National park in New South Wales, Australia

- IUCN category II (national park)
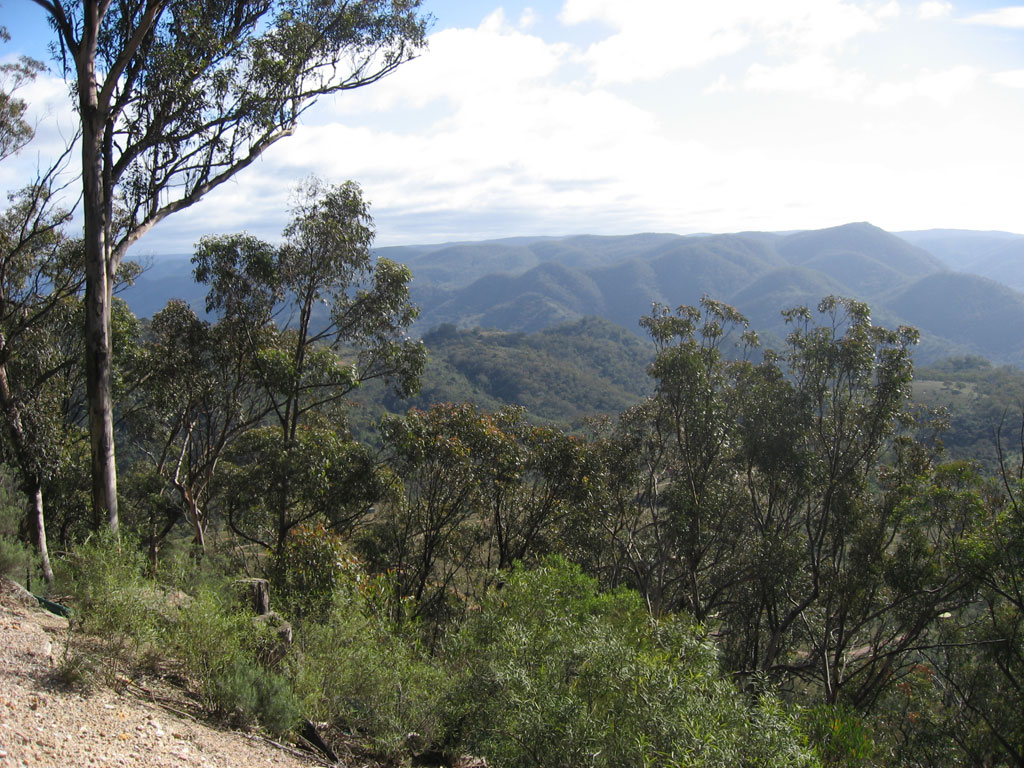
- Nattai National Park, from Wollondilly lookout.

- Location within New South Wales
- Location: New South Wales
- Nearest city: Oakdale
- Coordinates: 34°17′22″S 150°21′37″E
- Area: 489.84 km^{2} (189.13 sq mi)
- Established: 13 December 1991
- Visitors: 1000 (in 1997)
- Governing body: NSW National Parks and Wildlife Service
- Website: Official website

The Nattai National Park is a protected area located in the Macarthur and Southern Highlands regions of New South Wales, Australia. The 48,984-hectare (121,040-acre) area is situated approximately 150 kilometres (93 mi) southwest of the Sydney central business district and primarily encompasses the valley of the Nattai River, which is surrounded by sandstone cliffs. Part of the Southern Highlands Shale Forest and Woodland, the park is covered in dry sclerophyll (hard-leafed) forest – mostly eucalypt, and has frequent forest fires. As of May 2024, the park has no facilities.

The Nattai National Park is one of the eight protected areas that, in 2000, was inscribed to form part of the UNESCO World Heritage-listed Greater Blue Mountains Area. The Nattai National Park is the most southern of the eight protected areas within the World Heritage Site. The national park forms part of the Great Dividing Range.

The national park is bounded to the north by the Nattai State Conservation Area, the Burragorang State Conservation Area, and Lake Burragorang, inclusive of a 3-kilometre (1.9 mi) exclusion zone surrounding the lake; to the east by the Bargo State Conservation Area and the now partly disused Picton–Mittagong loop railway line; to the south by the Wombeyan Caves Road; to the southwest by the Kanangra-Boyd National Park; and to the west by the Yerranderie State Conservation Area. Blue Mountains National Park does not directly adjoin the Nattai National Park, but is located on the northwestern shore of Lake Burragorang.

The Nattai National Park contains much of the course and catchment of the Little, Nattai, Allum and Wollondilly rivers.

== History ==
The area now known as Nattai National Park has had a limited impact from Europeans. Several early expeditions attempting to cross the Blue Mountains passed through the area at the end of the 18th century, and settlers settled in the lower Nattai and Burragorang Valleys in 1827. Early conservationists Myles Dunphy and Herb Gallop went on bushwalks in the region from 1912 onward. An area of note was a forest of Eucalyptus saligna, commonly referred to as Sydney blue gum around Blue Gum Creek which was held in high regard.

Dunphy lobbied for the stand to be preserved upon becoming aware of plans to log the area but was unsuccessful, and the area was logged in the 1920s and 30s. Dunphy put forward a plan for a Greater Blue Mountains National Park, which incorporated what is now Nattai National Park in the southeast in 1932. The creation of Warragamba Dam in 1960 limited access for the development of land upstream, but it was not until 1991 that plans for permanent protection and national park status looked to become realized.

== Access ==
The national park can be accessed via Wattle Ridge Fire Road, located northeast of the small town of Hill Top. Access to a small, unsealed car park situated at the edge of the park is through an unsealed road. There are no facilities available except for an information board and a logbook. Visitors are required to sign in and out of the logbook when entering and exiting the park.

Alternate access is via the Wombeyan Caves Road.

== Activities ==
=== Bushwalking ===
Nattai National Park has several bushwalk trails. Backpack camping is allowed, with a remote campground by the Nattai River known as Emitts Flat at the end of the Starlights Trail.

The difficulties on the park's trails include: limited mobile reception, all trails requiring bushwalking experience and encounters with wildlife, such as snakes or wombats, being common.

=== Trails ===
The Starlights Trail
Starlights Trail is a scenic bushwalk in Nattai National Park, part of the Greater Blue Mountains trail network between Mittagong and Katoomba in Country NSW. Designed for experienced hikers, the trail spans 11 kilometers round trip and typically takes 4 to 5 hours to complete. It is classified as a Grade 4 hike, indicating a challenging route through varied landscapes in the Sydney surrounds.
Russells Needle
An extension of Starlights Trail from Emmetts Flat south along the Nattai River to a tall rock spire.
Katoomba to Mittagong Trail
A long-distance trail starting in the Greater Blue Mountains World Heritage Area – 132 kilometres (82 mi) in length.
Couridjah Corridor walk
Couridjah Corridor Walk is a 14-kilometer return trail that traverses both Thirlmere Lakes National Park and Nattai National Park in Sydney and surrounds, Country NSW. This trail is ideal for hiking, bushwalking, and birdwatching. The walk typically takes between 4 and 6 hours to complete and is classified as a Grade 4 hike, indicating a challenging route suited for experienced hikers.

== See also ==
- Protected areas of New South Wales
