= Victoria Bridge, Penrith =

Victoria Bridge over Nepean River
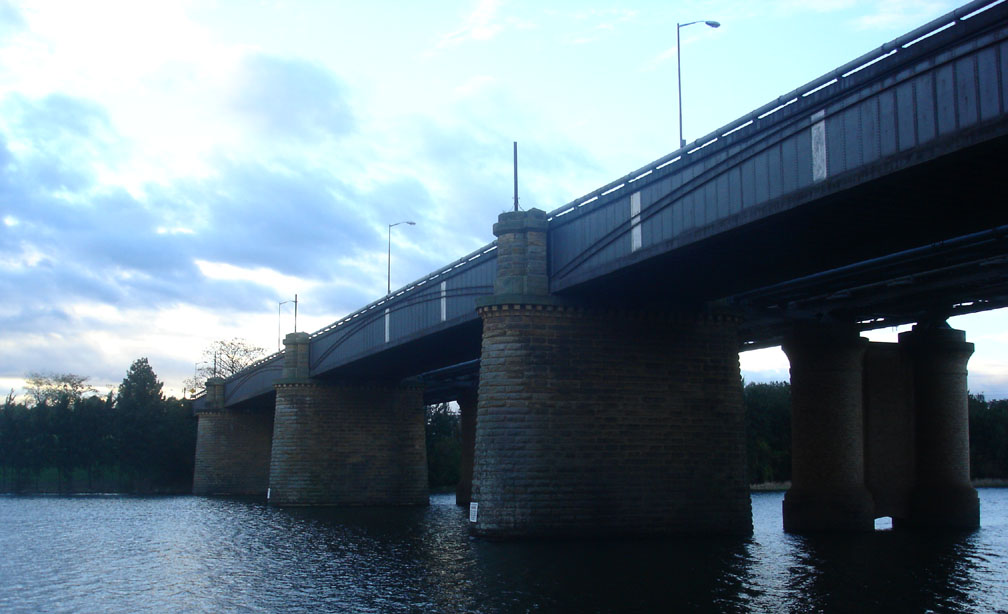
- Coordinates: 33°44′46″S 150°40′54″E
- Carries: Main Western Railway (1867–1907); Great Western Highway (1867–present)
- Crosses: Nepean River
- Locale: Penrith, New South Wales, Australia
- Official name: The Nepean Bridge
- Other names: Victoria Bridge on State Highway No. 5; RTA Bridge No. 333
- Owner: Transport for NSW

Characteristics
- Material: Wrought iron box girder; Steel girders with reinforced concrete decks
- Total length: 250 metres (820 ft)
- No. of spans: 5

History
- Designer: John Whitton
- Engineering design by: Peto Brassey and Betts (superstructure); William Watkins (piers)
- Construction start: 1864
- Construction end: 1867
- Construction cost: £110,000
- Replaces: Punts

Register of the National Estate
- Designated: 28 September 1982
- Reference no.: 3120

New South Wales Heritage Register
- Official name: Victoria Bridge; The Nepean Bridge; RTA Bridge No. 333
- Type: state heritage (built)
- Criteria: a., b., c., d., e., f., g.
- Designated: 27 May 2016
- Reference no.: 1950
- Type: Road Bridge
- Category: Transport – Land
- Builders: William Piper; Peto Brassey and Betts (superstructure); William Watkins (piers)

Location
- Interactive map of Victoria Bridge over Nepean River

The Victoria Bridge, also known as the Victoria Bridge over the Nepean River, is a heritage-listed former railway bridge and now wrought iron box plate girder road bridge across the Nepean River on the Great Western Highway in the western Sydney suburb of Penrith in the City of Penrith local government area of New South Wales, Australia. The bridge was designed by John Whitton, the Engineer–in–Chief of New South Wales Government Railways, and built from 1862 to 1867 by William Piper, Peto Brassey and Betts (superstructure), William Watkins (piers). It is also known as Victoria Bridge, The Nepean Bridge and RTA Bridge No. 333. It was added to the New South Wales State Heritage Register on 27 May 2016.

The bridge initially carried rail and horse–drawn traffic, and was converted in 1907 to exclusively carry the Great Western Highway. The bridge is managed by Transport for NSW. The bridge is the oldest surviving road crossing of the Hawkesbury–Nepean River. As at 2009, Roads & Maritime Services estimated that Victoria Bridge carried an average daily traffic of 25,000 vehicles per day.

Until 1856 travellers who wished to cross the Nepean River were required to use either the Emu Ford or a punt that was located south of the present day Victoria Bridge on Punt Road. This arrangement meant that in times of flood, travellers were often delayed at Penrith for days or even weeks waiting to cross the river. A small village developed near Emu Ford to cater to the people waiting to cross the river. With the discovery of gold west of the Great Dividing Range the flow of people, produce and animals through Penrith and across the river increased dramatically. It was no coincidence that attempts were made to build a permanent structure across the river, resulting in two timber road bridges located near to the eventual Victoria Bridge site being constructed.

Prior to the construction of the Victoria Bridge, a punt service was located at the site of the bridge. Following the discovery of gold in the west of the Great Dividing Range demand for a permanent river crossing increased. A timber bridge was constructed with private funds, charging a toll for its use.

In 1850 the Government of New South Wales, reacting to lobbying by Penrith locals, passed an Act authorising the construction of a bridge at the western end of Jamison Road. This scheme never went ahead. A second Act was passed in 1851 authorising the formation of a company, allocating A£6,000 for the construction of the bridge and allowing for the collection of tolls on the bridge. Following this act the Penrith and Nepean Bridge Company was formed. A further Act in 1854 increased the allocated funds to £20,000. The first directors of the Penrith and Nepean Bridge Company were local entrepreneurs Robert Fitzgerald, James Thomas Ryan, Edwin Rouse, John Perry, Charles York, Henry Hall, Alexander Fraser. Construction of the bridge was under the supervision of David McBeth, a Scottish surveyor.

The bridge, completed in December 1855, was 213 metres (700 ft) long and 8 metres (26 ft) wide, becoming the first bridge across the Nepean River in the area. McBeth received a £200 bonus on top of his £300 salary for the timely completion of the works, the toll rights for the first year were sold by the Penrith and Nepean Bridge Company for £2,250 and traffic flowed across the bridge. The successful Penrith and Nepean Bridge Company held a celebration party costing approximately £1,000 on the new bridge to celebrate its completion. Opened in January 1856, the bridge was destroyed by floods in 1857, and again rebuilt. Surviving the February 1860 flood, it was again destroyed in May 1860.

Unfortunately this success did not last long. In August 1857 a flood carried away the four centre spans, no doubt due to the poor security of the mid-stream timber piles which reportedly were frayed like mop heads where McBeth had attempted to drive them into rock. McBeth had lacked experience and knowledge in bridge building and although the piles close to the bank went in easily, the mid-stream timber piles had struck rock and failed to achieve a secure penetration.

The Penrith and Nepean Bridge Company decided to rebuild the bridge and employed an engineer named Moriarty to supervise the works. The construction contract was awarded to William Lockhart for £9,000. The piles that remained from the first bridge were utilised in the new bridge design, against the advice of both Lockhart and Moriarty. The new bridge was of a different, stronger design than the first and construction was completed in good time with the toll rights for one year selling for £2,850. The bridge withstood its first flood, but in 1860 the most devastating flood in New South Wales history until that time washed away the entire superstructure and deposited it on a bank down river. The structure was almost intact. Had the piles been replaced as originally suggested by the engineer and builder, the bridge might well have survived the flood. The Penrith and Nepean Bridge Company was ruined by the destruction of the bridge and the directors lost large sums of money. Following the destruction of this second bridge the Government supplied two punts to convey people and goods across the river. The punts were irreparably damaged by a flood in 1867.

The loss of the punts coincided with a period in which the Great Western Railway was in the advanced planning stages, including plans for the construction of a bridge over the Nepean River to link Penrith with Bathurst in the west, as part of the Penrith to Weatherboard Line (later Wentworth Falls). It was decided that the required bridge would carry both a railway line and a single lane of road over the river, as a temporary solution.

Victoria Bridge was designed by the Engineer-in-Chief of Railways in NSW, John Whitton and checked in Britain by his brother-in-law and renowned railway engineer John Fowler. Victoria Bridge was designed to carry two railway tracks as it was intended that the road on the bridge be only a temporary arrangement. The flood of 1860 that had carried off the previous bridge influenced Whitton to raise the bridge deck by two metres (six feet) after witnessing the power of high flood waters.

The design of the bridge uses half through girders which are actually tall boxes made of riveted wrought iron plates was driven by the need to keep the underside of the bridge as shallow as possible to maximise headroom for flood clearance. The configuration of their boxes with their tall web plates, and upper box for lateral stability, reflected cutting-edge design for the period. It utilised cutting edge of structural technology, using principles developed by Robert Stephenson in his design of the Britannia Bridge and the Conwy Railway Bridge in Wales, Thomas Telford and others who, by testing and theoretical work, developed techniques to prevent plate buckling by providing frequent vertical stiffeners, and sideways buckling of girders members by adding torsionally stiff boxes at the top and bottom. The first deep box girder bridge was designed by Stephenson and built across the Menai Strait in 1850. It was provided with suspension towers in case the deck was insufficiently strong and stiff, but the cables were never installed.

The construction contract for Victoria Bridge was split into several parts. One contract for the construction of the piers was awarded to William Tyler in 1862. He commenced work but flooding in 1863 and 1864 damaged his equipment and contributed to his abandonment of the contract in August 1864. The contract was subsequently awarded to W. Watkins for the sum of £44,658. He completed the work before the agreed completion date and avoided the £50 per week penalty he would have incurred had he not delivered on time.

The ironwork for the bridge was supplied by Peto, Brassey and Betts of Birkenhead, England for £41,750. The same firm had supplied the ironwork for the Menangle Railway Bridge constructed on the Nepean River in 1863 and now the oldest surviving bridge on the NSW railway system. The timber approach viaduct for the Victoria Bridge was constructed by Mr Baillie at a cost of £8,716. Other small contracts for earthworks were also made bringing the total cost of the 1100 tonne iron bridge to approximately £110,000.

The Nepean Bridge (Victoria Bridge) was completed on 6 June 1867, two weeks before the greatest flood ever recorded in the district passed under it. The Great Flood of 1867 damaged the western timber approaches and washed away a portion of the spans and river bank. The main spans however withstood this first major test and the flood waters did not reach the underside of the deck. Temporary repair work took about ten days to completed and as a result the bridge was opened to trains on 11 July 1867. The damaged timber viaduct was replaced by a shorter wrought iron box-girder span manufactured by the Thames Iron Company, Blackwall, England. During the construction of the spans the punt was used for road traffic until the bridge was re-opened to road traffic in 1869. The Victoria Bridge was considered to be of such modern design that it was featured in the "Modern Examples of Road and Railway Bridges" by Maw and Dredge in 1872.

Victoria Bridge had a significant impact on the local economy. Prior to its opening Penrith station formed the rail head of the western line, making Penrith a trade hub. The introduction of the road across the Nepean River diminished the business in the town previously brought in by travellers delayed in Penrith by poor river conditions. Conversely the opening of the bridge and the road and railway to the west enabled the growth of centres west of the mountains and the tourist industry of the Blue Mountains to become established.

Following the increase in rail traffic on the Great Western Railway and the increase in the weight of locomotive engines, options were considered for the duplication of the railway line and of the Victoria Bridge. The possibility of using Victoria Bridge to carry two rail lines was considered. But this would have required the strengthening of the bridge by constructing intermediate piers between the existing piers of the bridge, thus halving the length of the spans. This technique had been applied to Victoria Bridge's sister structure the Menangle Bridge in 1907. It was however decided that the construction of a second bridge alongside the Victoria Bridge would be more appropriate and construction on a steel truss bridge was undertaken. The piers of the new bridge lined up with Victoria Bridge's existing piers in an attempt to minimise stresses on the structures during high river flows. In 1907 the railway bridge that now stands alongside Victoria Bridge was completed, and is called Emu Plains (Nepean River) Underbridge, or Nepean River Underbridge. With its completion the Victoria Bridge was converted to carry two lanes of traffic and a footway while the new bridge carried two rail lines. Originally it took one railway line and a road across the river, however in 1907 another bridge was constructed a few metres to the north which thenceforth took two railway lines across the river, and the original bridge reverted to road and pedestrian use only.

In the mid-1930s the timber approach spans of the bridge were discovered to be heavily deteriorated through termite attack and the approach spans were replaced with reinforced concrete trestles and a concrete deck supported by rolled steel joists (RSJs).

The site of Victoria Bridge has long been a centre of recreation in the Penrith region. From the 1850s it has been used for national and international rowing competitions. The bridge is significant in the development of the colony of NSW as it allowed the railway, which previously terminated at Penrith, to reach the railway Blue Mountains and beyond, as well as providing continuous road passage across the river using the Great Western Highway.

== Current use ==
Today the bridge's significance as a road route to and from the Blue Mountains is diminished. Since 1971, the M4 Motorway has replaced the Great Western Highway as the main arterial route, crossing the Nepean River at Regentville, although the Victoria Bridge still officially carries the Great Western Highway into Emu Plains. Since the Knapsack Viaduct section was bypassed by the Western Motorway in 1993, the Great Western Highway joins the M4 Motorway in Leonay, where the route assumes the former's name.

The bridge maintains its significance as a local tourist attraction and a centrepiece to sporting events along the Nepean River, as well as continuing to serve as vital link between the suburbs west of the Nepean, such as Emu Plains, and the major suburban centre of Penrith. The 1907 railway bridge still takes the Main Western railway line over the river.

An undivided pedestrian pathway approximately 1.3 metres (4 ft 3 in) is located adjacent to the roadway. Following community advocacy, in 2010, Roads & Maritime Services commenced a feasibility study into a shared pedestrian/cyclist pathway over the bridge. By mid-2016 Roads & Maritime Services contracted Seymour Whyte to build the Yandhai Nepean Crossing, a pedestrian and cyclist bridge over the Nepean River, south of the Victoria Bridge, to connect Penrith and Emu Plains. The bridge opened in October 2018.

== Description ==
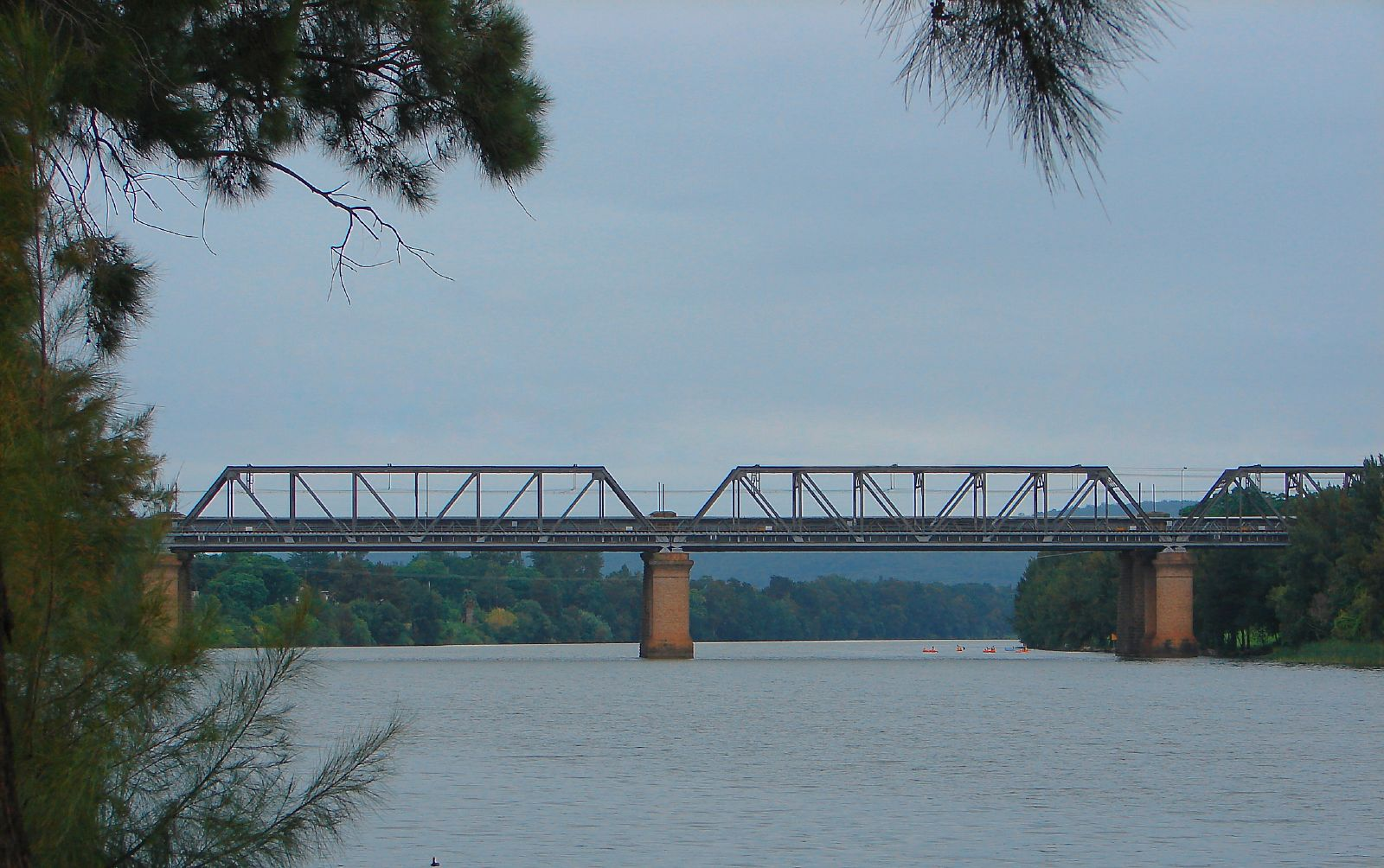
The railway bridge, to the north of the Victoria Bridge, operational from 1907

=== Overview ===
Victoria Bridge is a continuous iron through-bridge (the deck is between the girders rather than on top of them). The three main girders, each spanning a clear 56.7 metres (186 ft), were designed and constructed as one 181-metre (594 ft) long continuous structure (no separations over the piers), a novel structural feature for 1867 (Maw and Dredge). This structure, supported by hollow stone piers at 60.35 metres (198.0 ft) centres, has iron cross girders which support a concrete deck, 3.5 metres (11 ft) below the tops of the main girders which are 3.95 metres (13.0 ft) deep. Each span has a camber of 100 millimetres (3.9 in). There is a secondary, shorter, shallower, simply-supported girder, 41.1 metres (135 ft) long at the western (Emu Plains) end of the bridge. All four iron girders have pairs of hollow boxes top and bottom separated by two web plates, an early version of box-girder construction. They are all of riveted construction. The total weight of wrought iron is around 1,100 tonnes (1,213 short tons).

The bridge consists of three main spans of iron box girder, one secondary span of iron box girder and three concrete approach spans on either side of the bridge.

The piers that support the main spans are constructed of sandstone, the pier supporting the western end of the secondary iron girder span is constructed of mass concrete. The piers supporting the approach spans are constructed of concrete trestle frames. Piped services are supported under the pedestrian walkway portion of the deck and a large pipe is supported on the top flange of one of the main girders.

T-section shaped stiffeners can be seen running vertically down the sides of the girders at the bearing ends. There are 5 stiffeners over the central piers and 3 over outer piers. Stiffeners prevent the thin web plates from buckling vertically.

Architectural curved angle sections appear on the outer face of the girders of the main span. These serve no structural function but "lighten the appearance of the structure"

There are flood markers on the side of the easternmost sandstone pier. The remnants of old light posts can be seen on the piers on the northern side of the bridge.

There are modern street light posts and lights on the southern piers of the bridge.

=== Condition ===
As at 1 December 2008, the fabric of the bridge is generally in very good condition. There is little sign of rust on iron elements and concrete and stone elements also appear to be in good condition.

There may be remains of the piles of the earlier bridges still embedded in the riverbed. There is also the possibility that relics of the construction platforms, crane bases or cofferdams used to construct Victoria Bridge may be found in the riverbed.

=== Modifications and dates ===
The bridge has undergone several alterations, but remains largely intact.

- 1869 – Western approach spans were rebuilt following damage of the original timber approach spans by flood two weeks after the bridge was opened. The new spans were of a similar design to the main spans but with cast iron caisson piers.
- c. 1870–90 – The original road surface was close-fitting timber planking; wheel guides were installed to keep vehicles in a straight line.
- 1883 – a galvanised iron fence was installed between the railway track and the road. Around this time a warning bell was also installed, after several incidents involving livestock on the bridge being disturbed by passing trains.
- 1907 – new railway bridge was opened and the railway line was removed from Victoria Bridge. The deck was also reconstructed to accommodate two lanes of traffic.
- 1934 – Approach spans and abutments reconstructed in steel and concrete
- 19?? – The footway across the main spans reconstructed to provide for utility pipes.

== Heritage listing ==
Victoria Bridge is of state heritage significance as one of only three wrought iron through-girder bridges that were ever constructed in NSW, of which two remain. As the other surviving example, Menangle Bridge, has been significantly altered, Victoria Bridge is the most intact example in the state. This type of bridge was considered to be cutting-edge when it was designed. Its design principles were pioneered by Robert Stephenson in the Britannia Bridge and the Conwy Railway Bridge in Britain. Victoria Bridge has the largest spans of any metal girder bridge in NSW.

The bridge's role in bridging the Nepean River was key to bringing the railways to western NSW. The bridge's association with the designer of the Great Western Railway, John Whitton, is also of significance.

The bridge was listed on the New South Wales State Heritage Register on 27 May 2016.
