= Nepean River railway bridge, Menangle =

Nepean River railway bridge
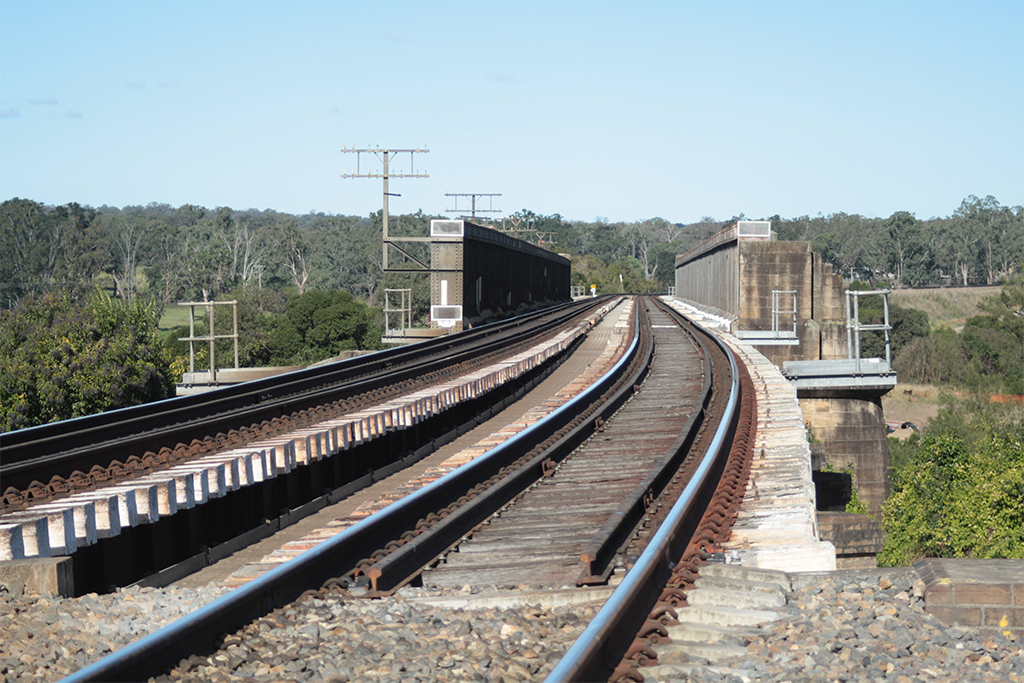
- Southbound view in June 2010
- Coordinates: 34°07′05″S 150°44′37″E
- Carries: Main Southern railway line
- Crosses: Menangle Road; Nepean River
- Locale: Menangle, Southern Highlands, New South Wales, Australia
- Official name: Menangle rail bridge over Nepean River
- Other name: Menangle Railway Bridge
- Owner: Transport Asset Manager of New South Wales
- Maintained by: Australian Rail Track Corporation

Characteristics
- Design: Girder bridge
- Material: Wrought iron
- Pier construction: Timber and sandstone (1863–1923); Steel (since 1923)
- Total length: 145.2 metres (476 ft)
- Width: 7.8 metres (26 ft)
- Longest span: 24.2 metres (79 ft)
- No. of spans: 3

Rail characteristics
- No. of tracks: Two
- Track gauge: 4 ft 8 1/2 in (1,435 mm) standard gauge

History
- Designer: Sir John Fowler for John Whitton
- Contracted lead designer: NSW Government Railways
- Engineering design by: NSW Department of Public Works
- Constructed by: Mssrs. Peto, Brassey and Betts
- Fabrication by: Canada Works, Birkenhead, England
- Construction start: 1862
- Construction end: June 1863
- Opened: 1 July 1863

New South Wales Heritage Register
- Official name: Menangle rail bridge over Nepean River
- Type: State heritage (built)
- Criteria: a., c., d., e., f., g.
- Designated: 2 April 1999
- Reference no.: 1047
- Type: Railway Bridge/Viaduct
- Category: Transport – Rail
- Builders: Mssrs. Peto, Brassey and Betts

Location
- Interactive map of Nepean River railway bridge

The Nepean River railway bridge is a heritage-listed railway bridge that carries the Main Southern railway line across Menangle Road and the Nepean River located at the outer south-western Sydney settlement of Menangle in the Wollondilly Shire local government area of New South Wales, Australia. It was designed by John Whitton as the Engineer-in-Chief, of the New South Wales Government Railways and NSW Department of Public Works. The railway bridge was built in 1863 by Messers Peto, Brassey and Betts. It is also known as the Menangle rail bridge over the Nepean River and Menangle Railway Bridge. The property was added to the New South Wales State Heritage Register on 2 April 1999.

== History ==
The Menangle Bridge is the first large iron railway bridge erected in New South Wales, whereas the first large railway bridge, an eight-span stone arch viaduct, was opened at Lewisham in 1855. The bridge opened in 1863. It was the first large iron railway bridge on the New South Wales Government Railways network. The bridge was manufactured in England by The Canada Works in Birkenhead. The bridge opened on 1 July 1863 with the line from Campbelltown station to Picton station. In 1907, the bridge was strengthened with intermediate piers and extra girders added.

When John Whitton planned the railway extension from Campbelltown to Picton, he was under pressure from the Government to keep costs low by using as much local material as possible. A metal girder design had been proposed by contractors Peto, Brassey and Betts but Whitton substituted a timber bridge made from ironbark and other strong hardwoods, a relatively short 151 metres (495 ft), low level crossing.

However the flood of 1860, some 18.3 metres (60 ft) above the proposed rail level, caused him to design a high level, large span bridge to maximise the waterway, flanked by long timber approach viaducts, a total of 582 metres (1,909 ft). It was a massive structure for its time, comprising 4,518 cubic metres (5,909 yd^{3}) of masonry, 833 cubic metres (1,089 yd^{3}) of brickwork and 849 tonnes; 836 long tons (936 short tons) tons of wrought iron for a total cost of A£94,562.

The iron superstructure was manufactured in England at the Canada Works, Birkenhead (opposite Liverpool) and shipped out in December 1861. One ship arrived in Sydney in April 1862 but the other was wrecked at the entrance to the Mersey River. However, the replacement ironwork was delivered to Sydney in December 1862.

Local man John Hourn hand made the bricks used to construct the bridge. John operated a small farm on the east side of the Nepean River near the bridge site. John Hourn also supplied bricks for other local structures, including the Church of England in the district.

Construction of the locally quarried sandstone abutments and piers were completed in October 1862 and the iron bridge was assembled ready for service by June 1863. Load testing, by three locomotives in full steam, followed and the line to Picton was opened on 1 July 1863.

The use of a continuous superstructure was technically significant because the analysis of such structures was a relatively new, sophisticated procedure. Also, it showed that Whitton and Fowler (London) appreciated the structural benefits that a continuous girder over three spans offered compared to three simply-supported spans.

The sister bridge to the Menangle Bridge was the Victoria Bridge over the Nepean River at Penrith. Their sizes and design were such that they were featured in an international text book Modern Examples of Road and Railway Bridges by William H. Maw and James Dredge, London, 1872.

The Menangle Railway Bridge was listed on the New South Wales State Heritage Register on 2 April 1999.

In 2009, the bridge received an Engineering Heritage Marker from Engineers Australia as part of its Engineering Heritage Recognition Program.

== Description ==
Since 1907, when intermediate piers were built in the middle of the three original 49.4-metre (162 ft) spans, the bridge has had six 24.2-metre (79 ft) spans. Between the original stone abutments, these additional brick piers alternate with the original stone piers.

The superstructure consists of two massive, wrought iron, cellular (box) girders, continuous from abutment to abutment, with no breaks at the piers. The 3.8-metre (12 ft)-deep girders are at 7.8-metre (26 ft) centres, which allows for a double track between them, supported on a series of closely spaced cross girders.

On the outer surfaces of the girders there are pairs of curved angle irons suggesting the inclusion of an arch, but they are purely decorative. There is no arch action, the superstructure is a girder.

At the Sydney end, the ornamental top of one of the piers was demolished by a derailment in 1976. The iron bridge itself received only superficial damage in the accident but the stonework was not replaced, leaving the cellular cross section of the girder exposed.

=== Condition ===
As of 26 April 2006, the physical condition was good. Apart from the insertion of the intermediate piers in 1907, the 1863 bridge retains most of its original fabric.

=== Modifications and dates ===
The principal modification has been the building of the intermediate piers in 1907 which, by halving the original spans, greatly increased the load capacity of the bridge, allowing it to still be in service, carrying modern, heavy, fast rail traffic. The original iron bridge was approached by timber viaducts, which were replaced by steel girders in 1923.

In 1993, consulting engineers, Dames & Moore of North Sydney, recommended a number of actions for a general refurbishment of the main bridge, including some minor repairs, cleaning up, painting and maintenance of the bearings, but no major changes.

In March 2003, the bridge was closed for one month while repairs were carried out. When it reopened it had a 20 kilometres per hour (12 mph) speed limit, later increased to 40 kilometres per hour (25 mph). It was announced in April 2003, the bridge would be replaced but that has not yet been done.

In October 2005, the speed limit was increased to 80 kilometres per hour (50 mph). In 2013, it was increased to the maximum line speed.

== See also ==
- List of railway bridges in New South Wales
- Victoria Bridge (Penrith)
