= Yandhai Nepean Crossing =

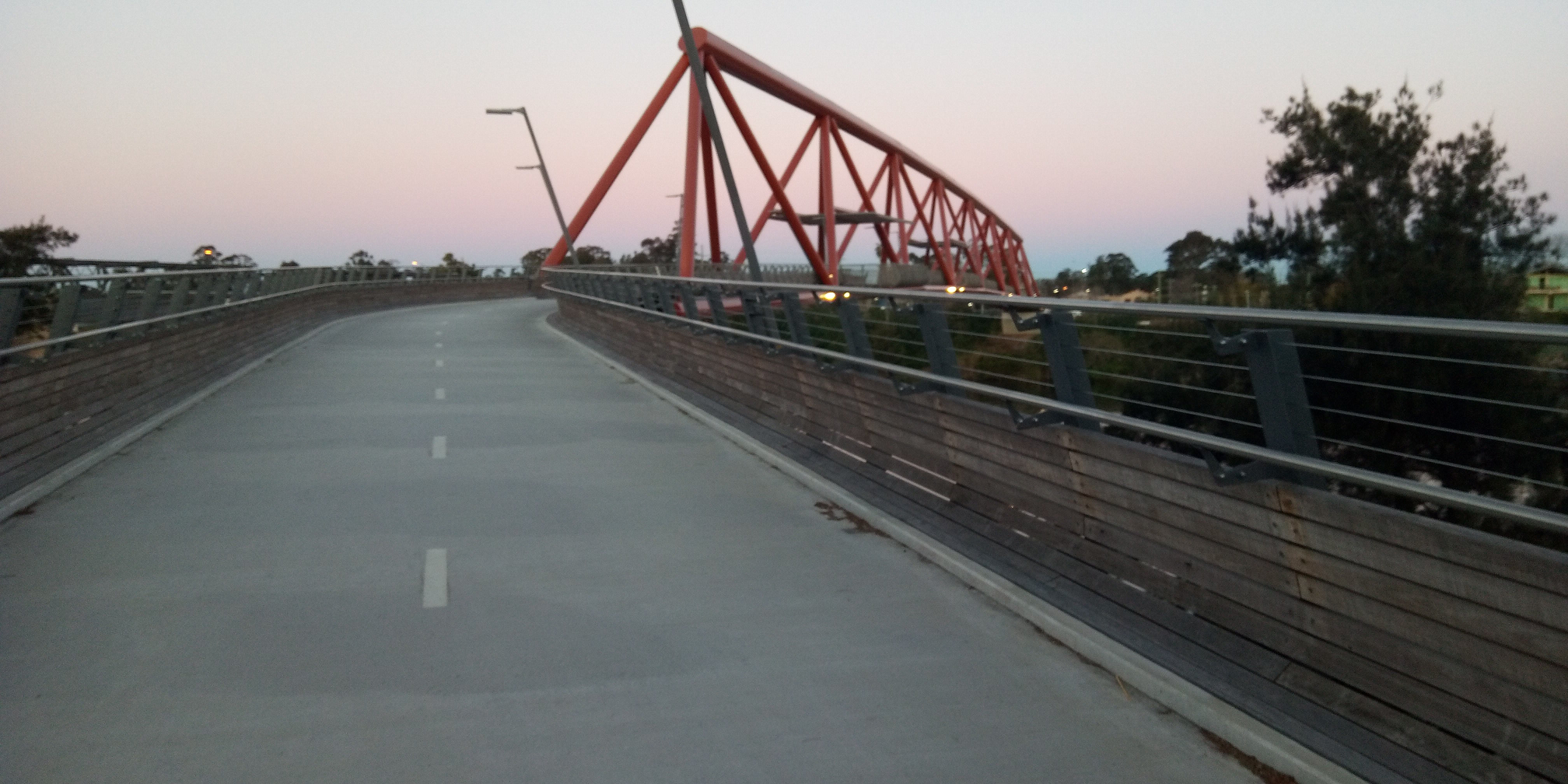
- Coordinates: 33.7470°S 150.6811°E
- Carries: Pedestrians
- Crosses: Nepean River
- Locale: Penrith, New South Wales
- Owner: Transport for New South Wales

Characteristics
- Total length: 258 metres
- Longest span: 200 metres

History
- Constructed by: Seymour Whyte
- Fabrication by: Civmec
- Opened: 28 October 2018

Location
- Interactive map of Yandhai Nepean Crossing

The Yandhai Nepean Crossing is pedestrian bridge in Sydney, Australia. At 258 metres long, it is the longest single clear-span footbridge in Australia. Located immediately south of the Victoria Bridge, it carries cycle and pedestrian traffic over the Nepean River between Penrith and Emu Plains.

It was built by Seymour Whyte with the fabrication conducted by Civmec at its Tomago factory. Site preparation commenced in December 2014, with the bridge opening on 28 October 2018.
