= Barrallier, New South Wales =

Coordinates: 34°19′S 150°04′E

Barrallier is a historical locality near the Southern Highlands of New South Wales, Australia, in Upper Lachlan Shire. The area was named after engineer and explorer Francis Barrallier. The name was changed in 1915 from Talloweena, due to a request by a local for suggestions of a new name from historians.

There is no postcode listed for Barrallier.

The locality is around the confluence of Murruin Creek with the Wollondilly River and is the site of an old ford on the Wollondilly. It is downstream from Goodman's Ford, where the Wombeyan Caves Road crosses the Wollondilly. It once had a post office. It was designated as a 'historical locality' in 1997.
