= Pejar Dam =

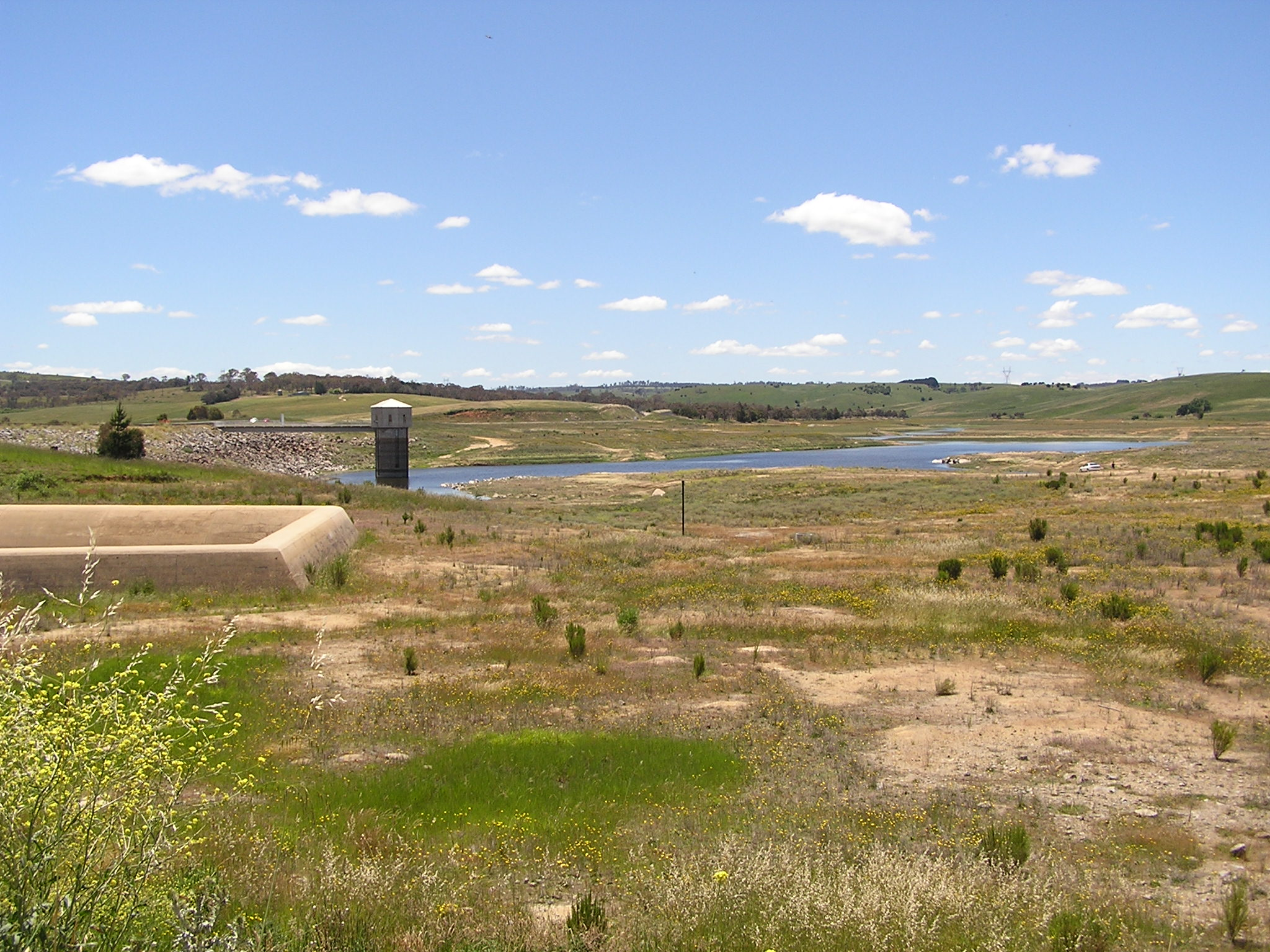
- Pejar Dam in November 2005

- Location of the Pejar Dam in New South Wales
- Country: Australia
- Location: Southern Tablelands, New South Wales
- Coordinates: 34°34′54″S 149°34′33″E
- Purpose: Potable water supply
- Status: Operational
- Opening date: 1979
- Owner: Goulburn Mulwaree Council

Dam and spillways
- Type of dam: Embankment dam
- Impounds: Wollondilly River
- Height: 26 m (85 ft)
- Length: 367 m (1,204 ft)
- Dam volume: 95×10^{3} m^{3} (3.4×10^{6} cu ft)
- Spillway type: Uncontrolled
- Spillway capacity: 2,470 m^{3}/s (87,000 cu ft/s)

Reservoir
- Total capacity: 9,000 ML (320×10^{6} cu ft)
- Catchment area: 143 km^{2} (55 sq mi)
- Surface area: 1.55 km^{2} (0.60 sq mi)

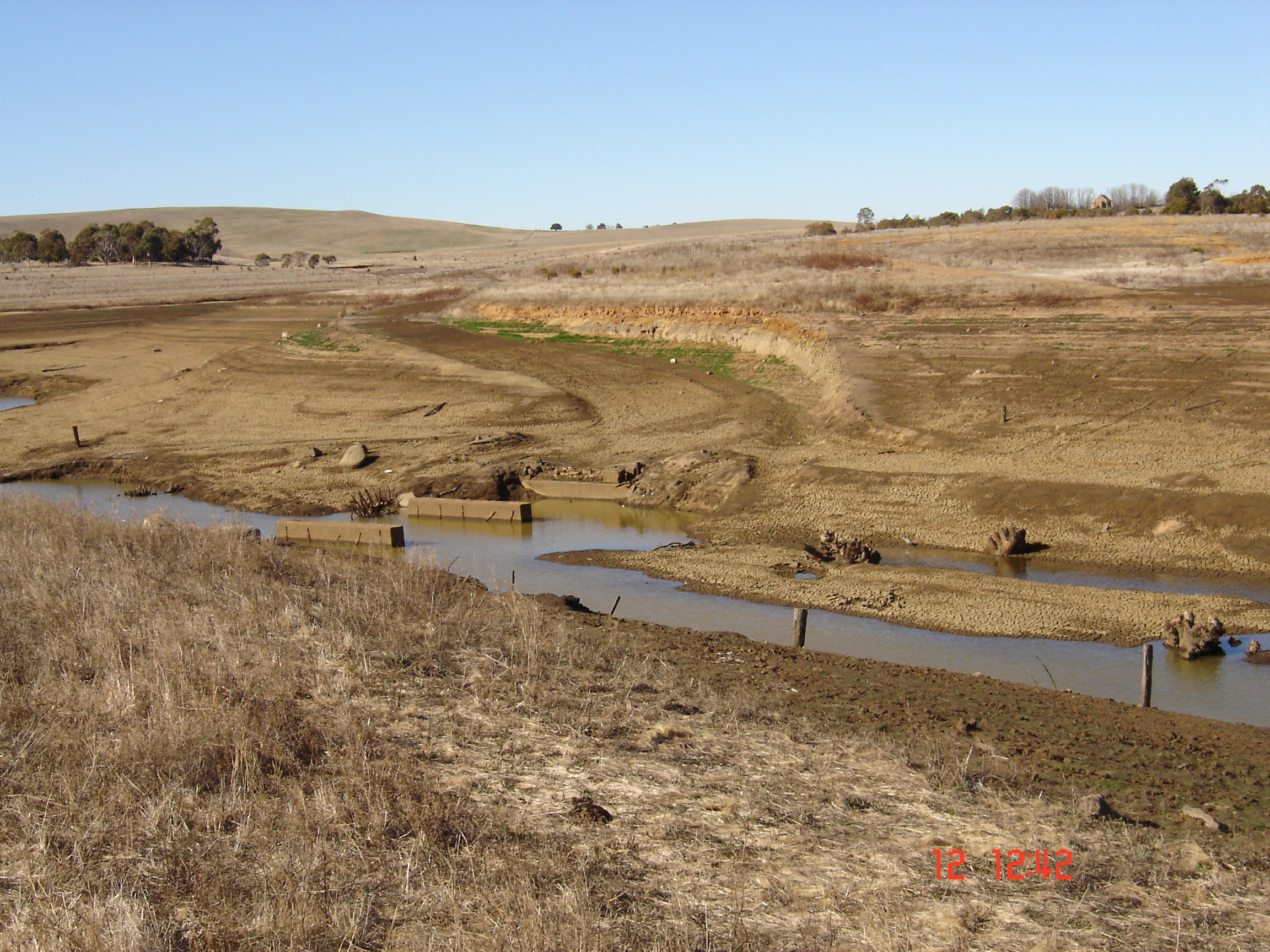
Pejar dam photographed in June 2006 showing an abandoned low-level crossing of the Wollondilly River, just upstream from the dam wall.

The Pejar Dam is an earth and rock-filled embankment dam with an uncontrolled spillway across the Wollondilly River, located in the Southern Tablelands region of New South Wales, Australia. The principal purpose of the dam is to supply potable water for the city of Goulburn. The impounded 9,000-megalitre (320×10^{6} cu ft) reservoir is also called Pejar Dam.

== Location and features ==
The dam was completed in 1979 by the New South Wales Department of Works for the Goulburn City Council to augment the water supply. The height of the dam wall is 26 metres (85 ft), and 367 metres (1,204 ft) in length. The earth and rock-filled embankment wall is 95×10^{3} m^{3} (3.4×10^{6} cu ft) by volume. The uncontrolled spillway discharges overflow at the rate of 2,470 cubic metres per second (87,000 cu ft/s). The reservoir has a maximum storage capacity of 9,000 megalitres (320×10^{6} cu ft) over 1.55 square kilometres (0.60 sq mi) drawn from a catchment area of 143 square kilometres (55 sq mi).

It is one of three water storage facilities serving the city, and is used to augment the water supply when Sooley Dam is unable to maintain enough water in Rossi Weir, from which Goulburn's water filtration plant is supplied. Water is released from the dam down the Wollondilly River where due to issues of loss the water fails to arrive at Rossi weir, upstream from Goulburn. Water is actually pumped to the city's water treatment works from Rossi Weir which is pumped down from Sooley Dam then and distributed to Goulburn's reticulation system for consumption.

== Recreation ==
The Pejar Dam is stocked with rainbow and brown trout and is a popular spot for trout anglers.

Powered and unpowered boating is permitted on the reservoir; with access via a gravel launch ramp. The reservoir is suitable for kayaks and canoes. Barbeques, picnic shelters, untreated water, and rubbish bins are provided. Swimming is not permitted. Camping is also not permitted at Pejar Dam.

== Criticism ==
In theory Pejar Dam represents 60% of Goulburn's' water, because of its size in proportion to the total storage. In practice, Pejar Dam does not perform near this level because it is not catching and then delivering that amount of water to Goulburn. This is because Pejar Dam has no engineered link to the city and no engineered link to the river.

In May 2005, the Goulburn City Council announced that, as a result of prolonged drought conditions, storage had reached a crisis point as dam levels fell to 10% of capacity. Even though there had been no significant rain since December 2004 Sooley Dam had maintained a capacity of 70%.

In March 2006, in the drought and when Sooley Dam was full, Council released all the remaining water from the Pejar Dam accounting to about 900 megalitres (32×10^{6} cu ft) or 10% of its storage. On 21 April 2006 the Pejar Dam was declared officially empty after the local water authority emptied the dam.

=== Hydrology studies ===
Pejar Dam was last full in November 2000. Five years later, in May 2006, it was empty. It remained empty until heavy rain in June 2007. In 2008, Pejar Dam was about 50% capacity. During this same period Sooley Dam did not drop below 70% of storage.

== See also ==
- List of reservoirs and dams in New South Wales
