= Barrallier Island =

Island in Victoria, Australia

Coordinates: 38.2762°S 145.3133°E

Barrallier Island is a very small uninhabited island located 1 kilometre (0.6 mi) northwest of French Island in Victoria, Australia.

The island is shown on the chart of Western Port based on the 1801 survey by James Grant in HMS Lady Nelson. The island is named after Francis Barrallier, who was responsible for the charting of Western Port.

== Flora & fauna ==
- Sparse scrub and grass vegetation on the higher parts of the island
- Mangroves on the southern shore
