= Wollondilly River =

River in Australia

Wollondilly Deerabublin River (1819–1968)
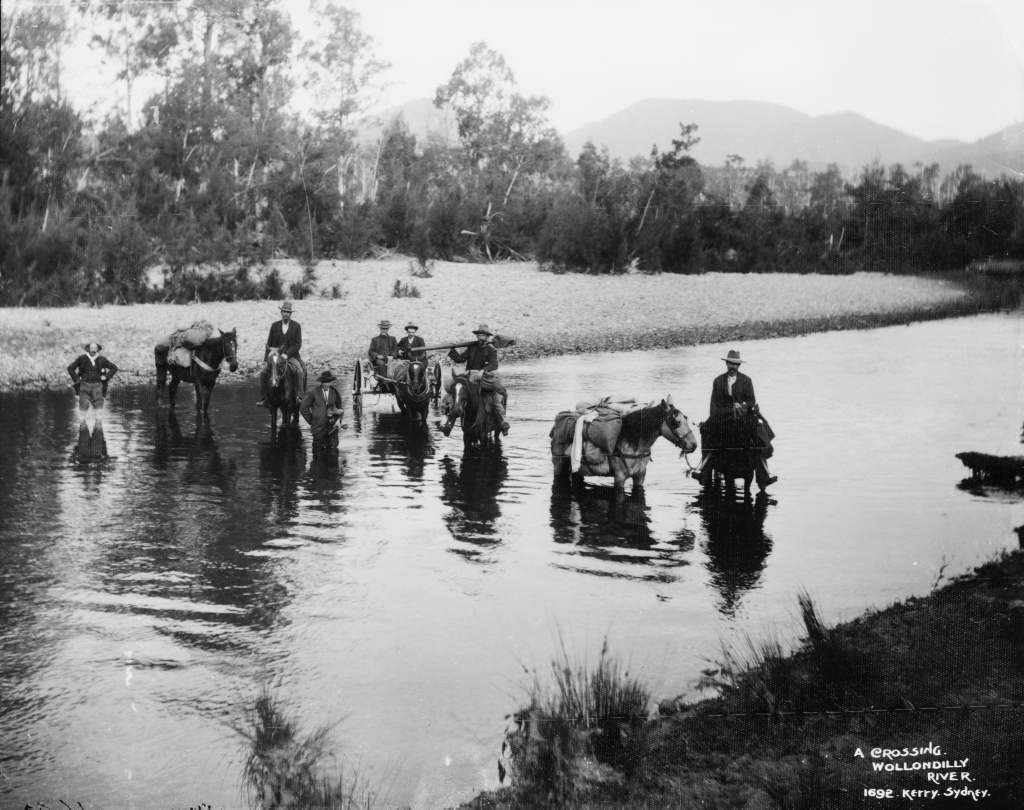
- A trek crossing the river, circa 1900. Picture from the Powerhouse Museum.
- Etymology: Aboriginal: wallandillii meaning 'water trickling over rocks' (but there is no evidence for this in Tharawal language).

Location
- Country: Australia
- State: New South Wales
- Region: South Eastern Highlands (IBRA), Southern Tablelands, Southern Highlands
- Local government areas: Goulburn Mulwaree, Wollondilly Shire

Physical characteristics
- Source: Great Dividing Range
  - location: McAlister, near Crookwell
  - coordinates: 34°27′0″S 149°34′0″E
  - elevation: 993 m (3,258 ft)
- Mouth: Lake Burragorang
  - coordinates: 33°57′0″S 150°26′0″E
  - elevation: 115 m (377 ft)
- Length: 156 km (97 mi)
- Basin size: 2,699 km^{2} (1,042 sq mi)

Basin features
- River system: Hawkesbury–Nepean catchment
- Tributaries
  - left: Lake Sooley, Tarlo River, Hanworth Creek, Tallygang Creek, Jocks Creek, Murruin Creek, Tomat Creek, New Yards Creek, Jooriland River
  - right: Mulwaree River, Uringalla Creek, Bangadilly Creek, Wingecarribee River, Myrtle Creek (New South Wales), Goodfellows Creek
- Reservoirs: Pejar Dam, Lake Burragorang

The Wollondilly River, an Australian perennial river that is part of the Hawkesbury–Nepean catchment, is located in the Southern Tablelands and Southern Highlands regions of New South Wales. The river meanders from its western slopes near Crookwell, flowing south-east through Goulburn, turning north-east to near Bullio, flowing north-west to Barrallier, before finally heading north-easterly into its mouth at Lake Burragorang.

== Course and features ==
The Wollondilly River was originally a tributary of the Warragamba River, and hence of the Hawkesbury–Nepean catchment. Following the construction of the Warragamba Dam across the Warragamba River, today the river flows into Lake Burragorang, the major water supply for the Greater Sydney region.

The Wollondilly River rises about 7 kilometres (4.3 mi) east of Crookwell and initially flows south, impounded by Pejar Dam, to a point near Pomeroy. It then flows south-east and then east through Goulburn, where it is joined by the Mulwaree River. At Towrang the river turns north-east to a point near Bullio, where it is joined by the Wingecarribee River. From here the Wollondilly River takes a wide detour to the north-west to Barrallier, where it turn east before eventually regaining its north-easterly course into Lake Burragorang.

The river has a total length of approximately 156 kilometres (97 mi). The subcatchment area is 2,699 square kilometres (1,042 sq mi), and the largest in the Hawkesbury–Nepean Catchment.

Wollondilly Shire is a local government area that is named after the Wollondilly River. The name Wollondilly is said to be derived from wallandillii, an Aboriginal word for 'water trickling over rocks'. However, there is no evidence for this in Tharawal language.

== See also ==
- List of rivers of Australia
- List of rivers of New South Wales (L–Z)
- Rivers of New South Wales
