= Ripple Creek =

Stream in Wisconsin, U.S.

Coordinates: 44°20′12″N 89°52′42″W

Ripple Creek is a stream in the U.S. state of Wisconsin.

It is uncertain why the name "Ripple Creek" was applied to this stream; the name may be descriptive.
