= Lake Burragorang =

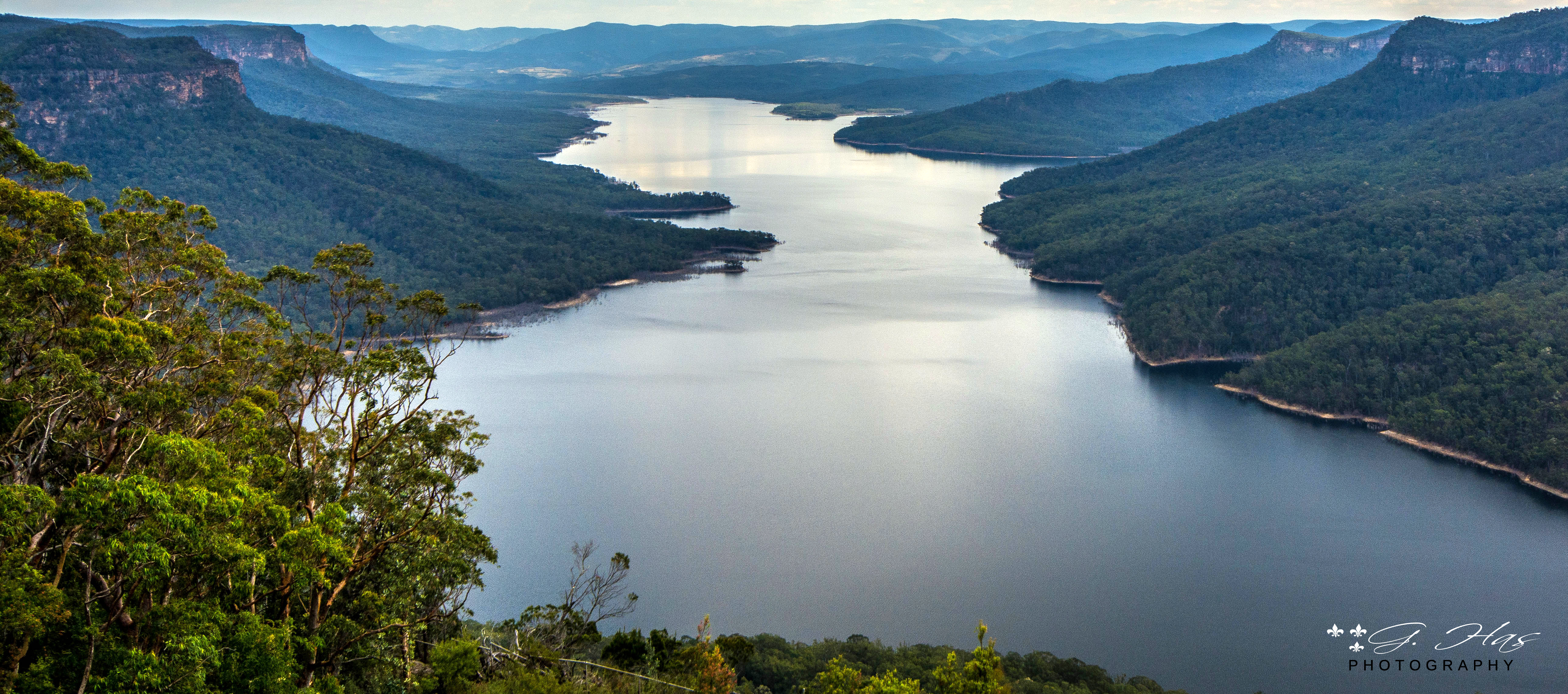
- The lake in January 2014

- Location within Australia Location within New South Wales
- Coordinates: 34°0′S 150°26′E
- Type: Man-made water supply dammed reservoir
- Primary inflows: Coxs, Kowmung, Nattai, Wingecarribee, Wollondilly and Warragamba rivers
- Primary outflows: Warragamba River
- Catchment area: 9,051 km^{2} (3,495 sq mi)
- Basin countries: Australia
- Max. length: 52 km (32 mi)
- Surface area: 75 km^{2} (29 sq mi)
- Max. depth: 105 m (344 ft)
- Water volume: 2,031 GL (4.47×10^{11} imp gal; 5.37×10^{11} US gal)
- Shore length^{1}: 354 km (220 mi)
- Surface elevation: 110 m (360 ft)
- ^{1} Shore length is not a well-defined measure.

Lake Burragorang is a man-made lake in New South Wales, Australia. The lake is situated within the World Heritage Listed Greater Blue Mountains Area and within the Wollondilly Shire Council Local Government Area.

The lake serves as a major water supply reservoir for a large portion of the greater metropolitan Sydney area. The lake is impounded by Warragamba Dam located adjacent to the Warragamba Village which is approximately 30 kilometres (19 mi) northwest of the Camden township and approximately 60 kilometres (37 mi) southwest of the Sydney central business district.

The lake collects water from the converged flows of the Coxs, Kowmung, Nattai, Wingecarribee, Wollondilly, and Warragamba rivers and their associated tributaries, all within the Nepean and Hawkesbury River catchment. The reservoir has a capacity of 2,031-gigalitre (4.47×10^{11} imp gal; 5.37×10^{11} US gal).

== Pre-lake history ==
Before the construction of the dam, Burragorang Valley, as well as the nearby Megalong Valley had been inhabited by the Dharug and Gundungurra Aboriginal people for thousands of years. In the 19th century, white settlers arrived in the area. A number of farming towns (including the town of Burragorang) and coal mines were located in the area. All of these are now underwater. Construction of Warragamba dam commenced in 1948 and was completed in 1960.

== Capacity ==
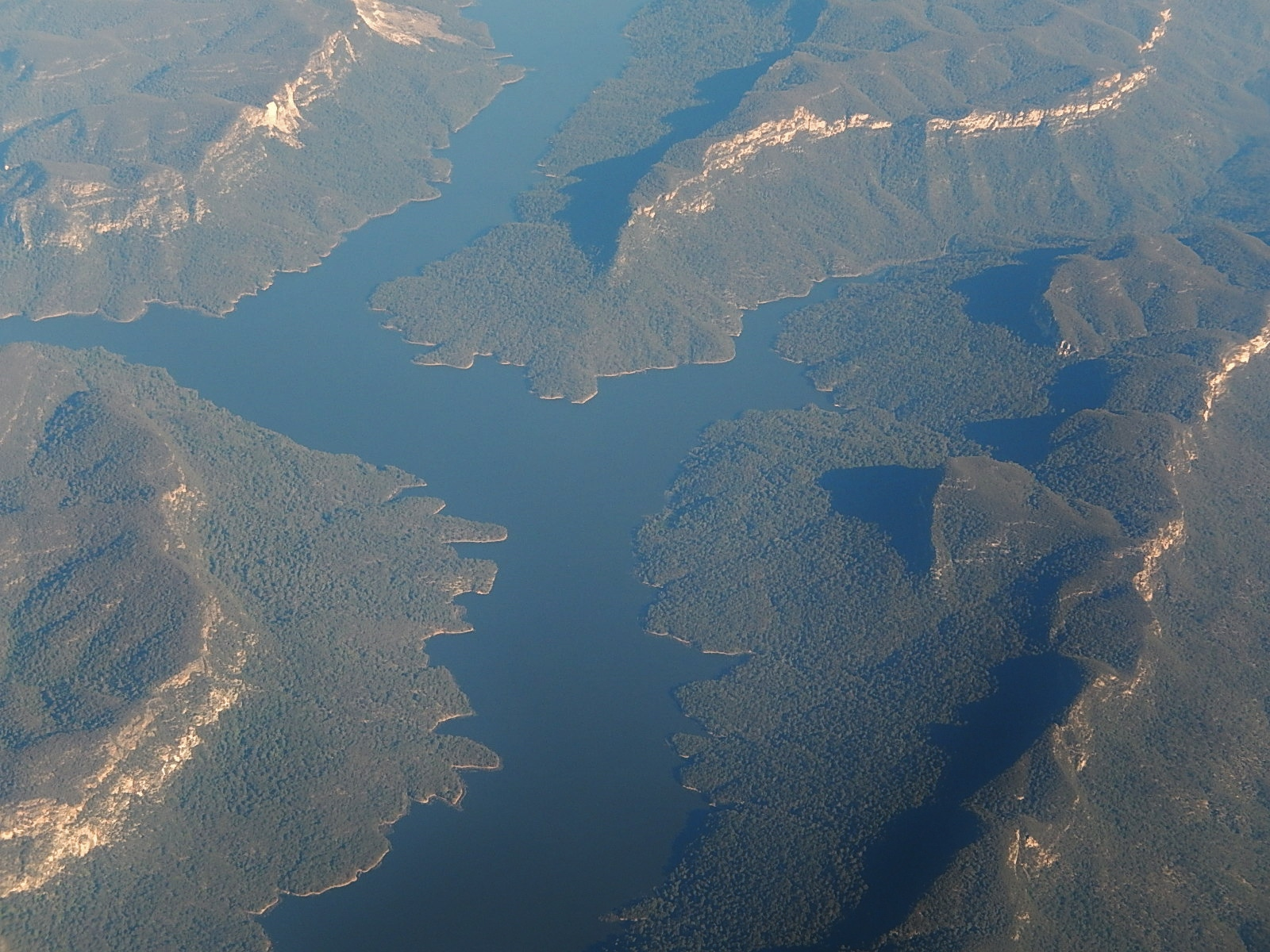
An aerial view of the lake

The reservoir's usable capacity is 2,027 gigalitres (4.46×10^{11} imp gal; 5.35×10^{11} US gal). Prior to April 2006, the usable capacity was 1,857 gigalitres (4.08×10^{11} imp gal; 4.91×10^{11} US gal), before the Deep Water Storage Recovery project was completed. There are fears, however, that population pressures may stretch the reservoir's ability to furnish Sydney residents with needed water well into the 21st century. The city's population is rising by about 50,000 every year. Water restrictions (limited usage purposes and times), were imposed late in 2003 and are reapplied during serious droughts, which are expected to become more frequent.

There have been times when the reservoir has become seriously depleted. On 8 February 2007 the lake recorded an all-time low of 32.5% of capacity, although by late 2008 the water level had returned to 60% of capacity. To reduce the likelihood of a water supply failure, the NSW Government authorised the construction and operation of the Sydney Desalination Plant to augment Sydney's water supply.

The dam reached maximum capacity and spilled in March 2012, the first time it had done so in fourteen years. This is consistent with increasingly extreme weather events, where longer periods of drought and reduced total rainfall, is expected to be punctuated with shorter, heavier and more sporadic downfalls events.

In November 2019, the government proposed a $700 million plan to raise the height of the dam by 14 metres. The purpose is stated as providing flood mitigation for downstream land. Critics have alleged it may be to allow rezoning of prime agricultural in the flood zone, to residential property for commercial developers. Increasing the capacity would result in flooding large areas of native wildlife habitat, in a relatively protected water catchment area. It would also flood large areas of native vegetation, that provides a substantial carbon dioxide sink, without proposal for replacement. The announcement was made while an application for concessions to extend mining operations inside the drinking water catchment areas, is under consideration. In the first week of December 2019, the water catchment area experienced large bush fires, during a widespread and extreme fire season in Eastern Australia.

== Public access ==
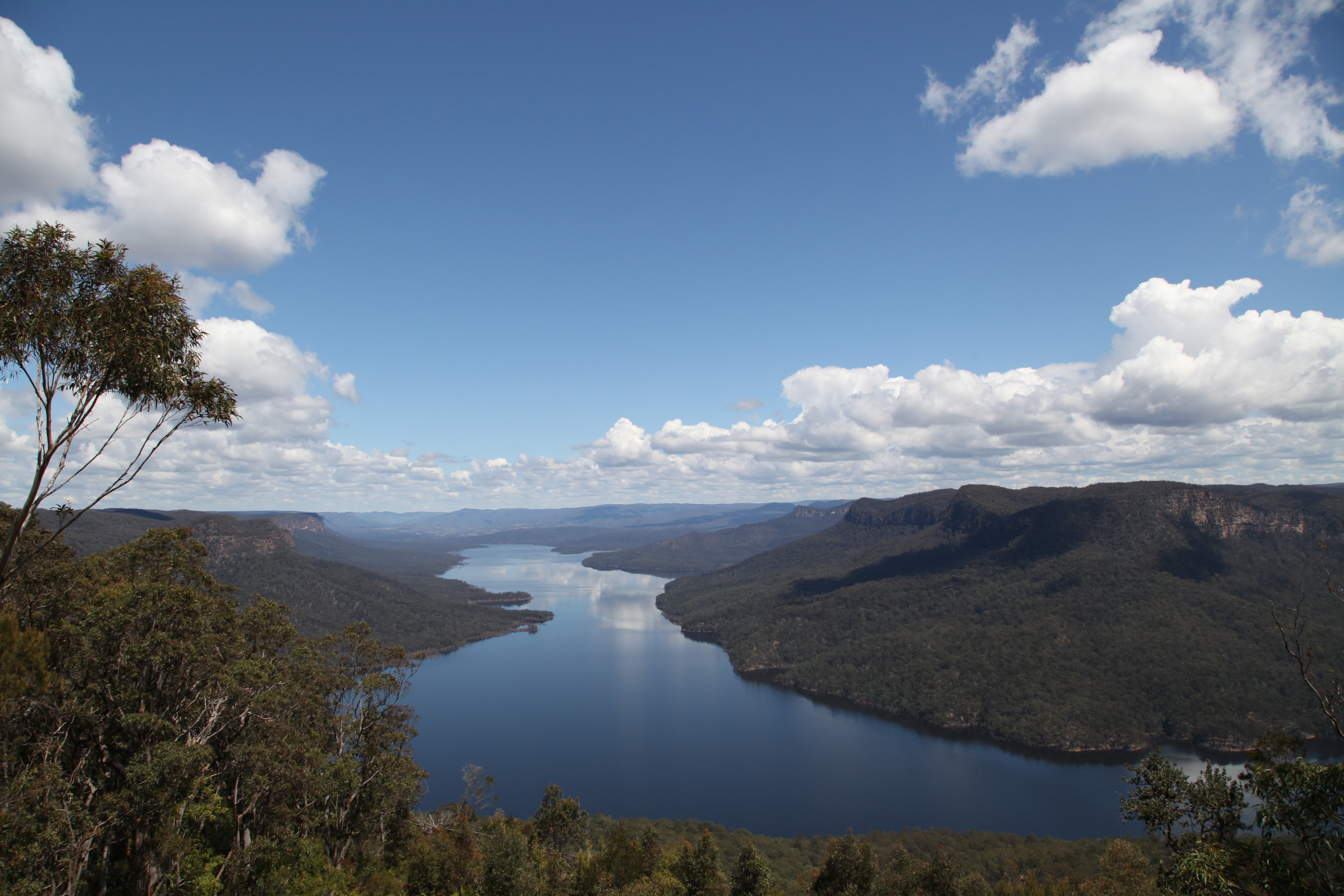
The lake viewed from the Lake Burragorang lookout

Lake Burragorang is surrounded by a 3 kilometres (1.9 mi) wide exclusion zone to protect the integrity of the water supply; access into this zone is restricted. There are two access corridors for bushwalkers: Coxs River to Mount Cookem, and Belloon Pass to Yerranderie. Limited public vehicle access is allowed on fire trail W4 from Sheahys Creek to Yerranderie.

== Power station ==
A hydroelectric power station at Warragamba Dam begins operating once the level in the reservoir reaches to within 1 metre (3 ft 3 in) of full capacity. Its output is 50 megawatts (67,000 hp). A long drought lasting 14 years resulted in the dam water level being insufficient for it to operate from 1998 to 2012. In 2016, late 2020 and each subsequent year, it has operated as the dam has spilled on multiple occasions.

== Statistical overview ==
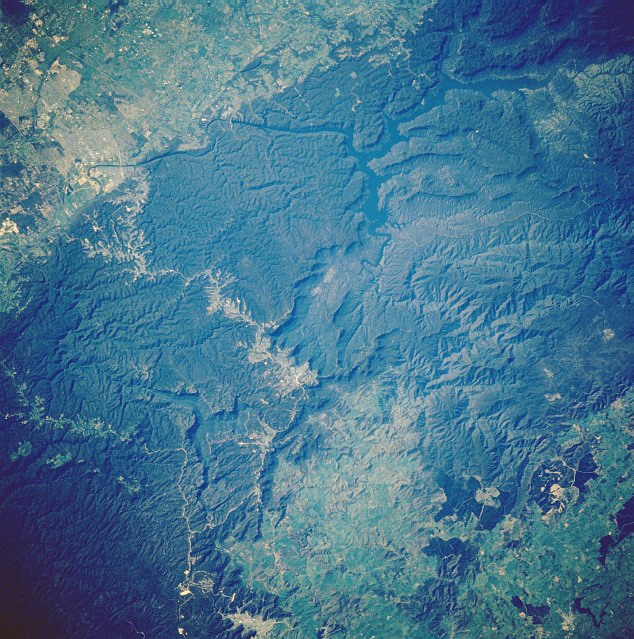
Lake Burragorang from space, November 1985

Key reservoir statistics
Available storage (when full)	2,027 gigalitres (4.46×10^{11} imp gal; 5.35×10^{11} US gal)
Total capacity (when full)	2,031 gigalitres (4.47×10^{11} imp gal; 5.37×10^{11} US gal)
Surface area	75 square kilometres (29 sq mi)
Length of lake	52 kilometres (32 mi)
Length of foreshores	354 kilometres (220 mi)
Deepest point	105 metres (344 ft)
Catchment area	9,051 square kilometres (3,495 sq mi)
Average annual rainfall	840 millimetres (33 in)

== See also ==
- List of Blue Mountains articles
