= Yerranderie =

Ghost town in southeast Australia

Coordinates: 34°07′S 150°13′E

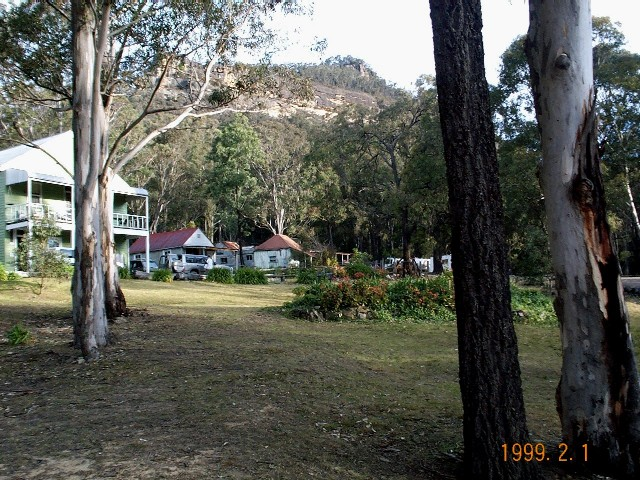
General view of Yerranderie

Yerranderie is a ghost town located near Kanangra-Boyd National Park in New South Wales, Australia in Wollondilly Shire.

== History ==
Yerranderie was formerly a silver mining town of 2000 people, but the mining industry collapsed in 1927, and the town was cut off from direct access from Sydney by the establishment of the Warragamba Dam and Lake Burragorang in 1959. Country singer Frank Ifield immortalised the event with his song "Yerranderie". The Yerranderie Post Office opened on 1 November 1899 and closed in 1958.

The town is now divided into two sections, the residential township adjacent to a private airstrip and the historic site one kilometre further west. The area is surrounded by abandoned mine shafts and mining relics. Accessible mainly by a 4WD dirt road, the old Colong stock route from Oberon 70 km. to the west; another route passes through Oakdale to the east, but that road is closed to public access as it passes through a water catchment area. Aircraft also occasionally fly out from Camden Airport. The township was established on the slopes north of Yerranderrie Peak, which is the remains of a volcanic dyke and the source of the mineral wealth of the area. The name of Yerranderrie is taken from two local Aboriginal words meaning "slope" and "summit".

Yerranderie was caught up in what was, at the time, the world's longest labour strike, lasting for eighteen months in 1919–1920. The workers of this small mine belonged to the same union as those at Broken Hill. When the Broken Hill mine went on strike, the workers at Yerranderie were required to join that strike by their union. The strike, however, was not about any issue at Yerranderie.

The town was eventually bought by Valerie Anne Lhuede, who developed it as a tourist centre and total environment project. The old post office is now known as The Lodge and serves as a guest house. Other restored buildings include two miners cottages as well as several shops. The caretakers live in Krubi Cottage nearby.

In March 2011, Lhuede announced, "I am donating Yerranderie to the National Parks and Wildlife Service with a list of my wishes for Yerranderie’s future."

Val Lhuede AM passed away on 27 September 2024 at the age of 101.

== Gallery ==
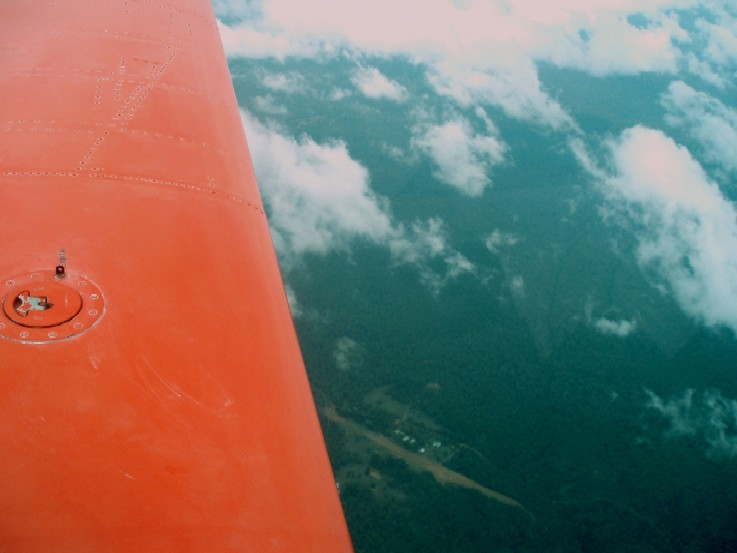
Yerranderie from the air

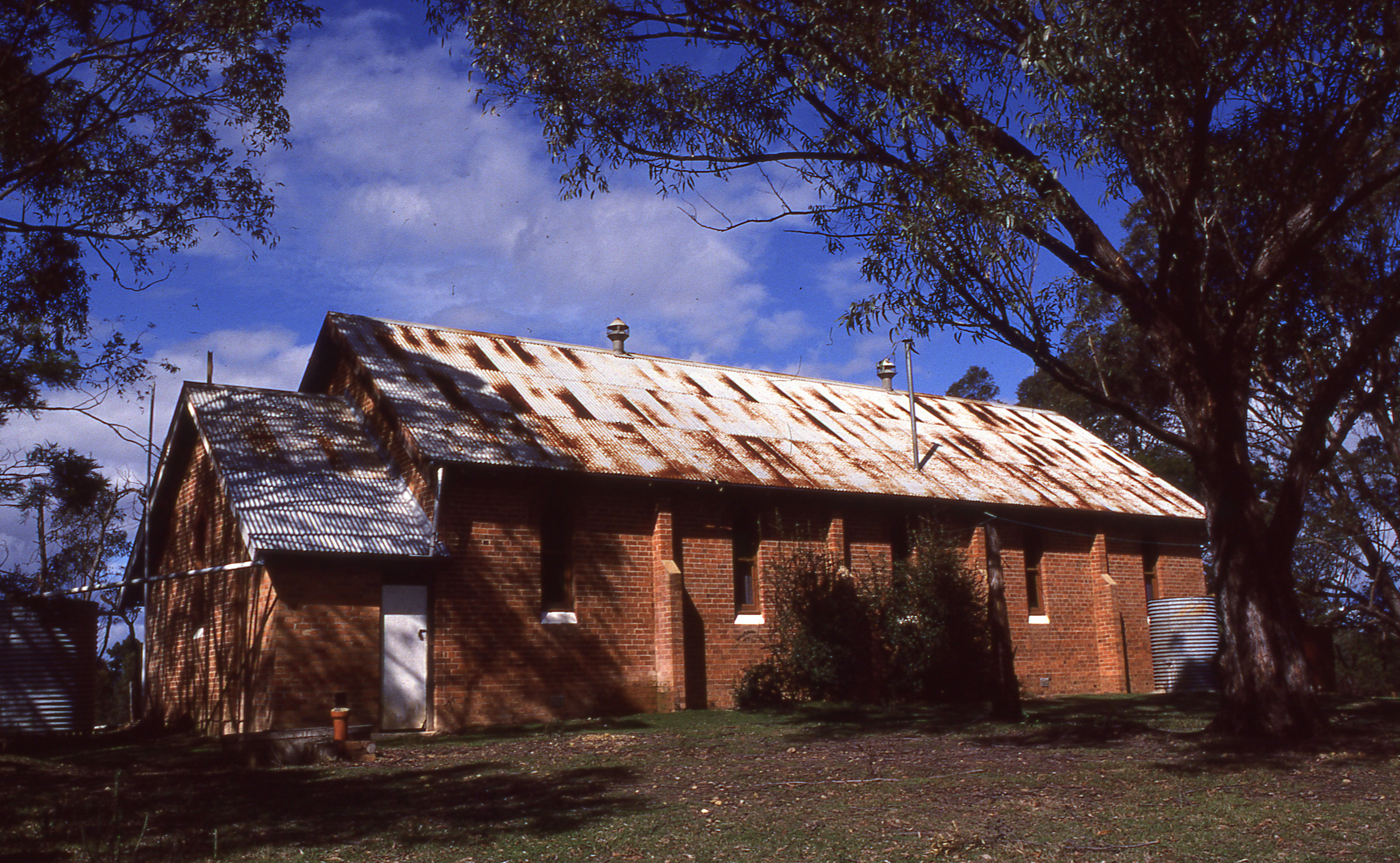
Old church, Yerranderie

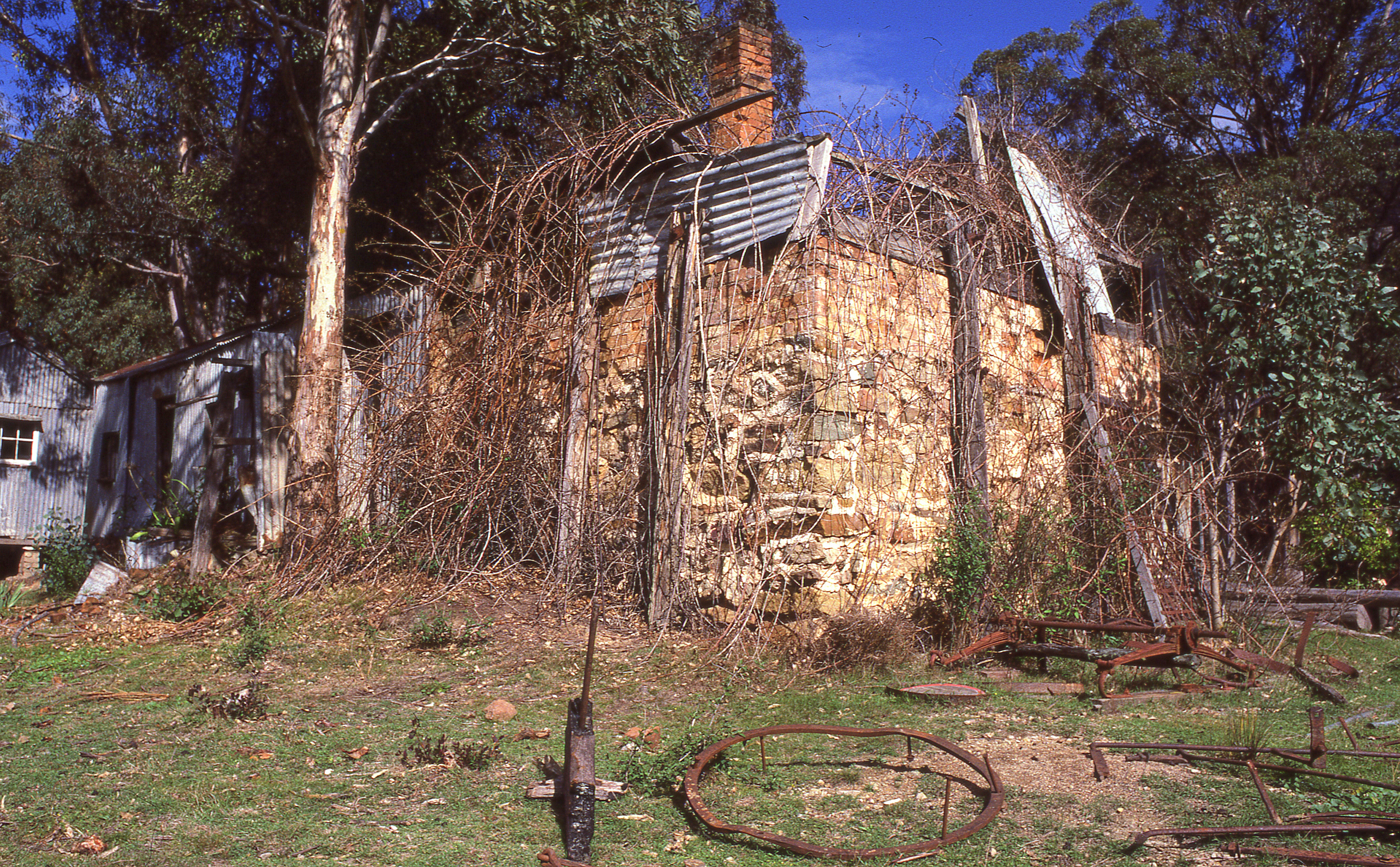
Ruins at Yerranderie

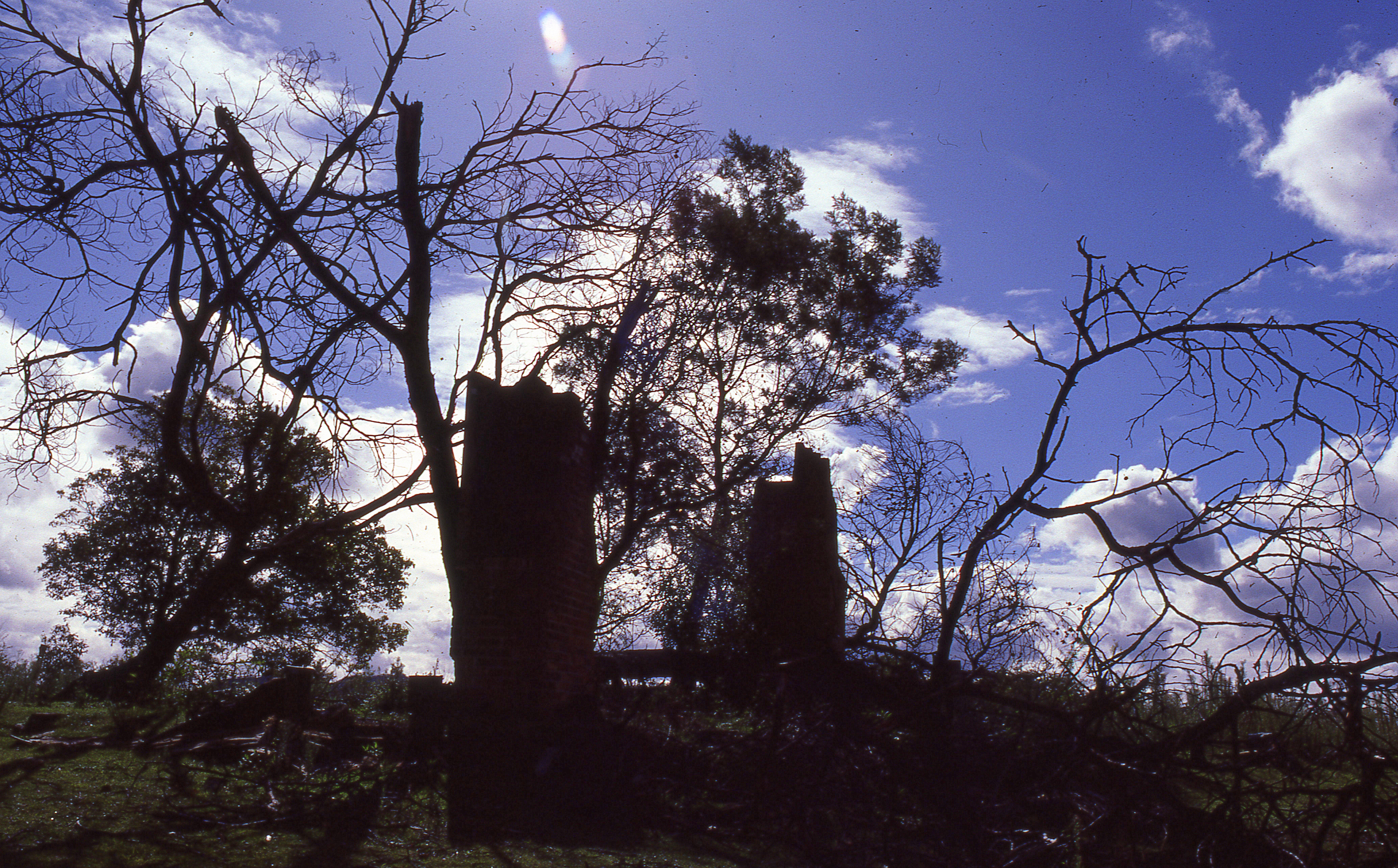
Ruins at Yerranderie

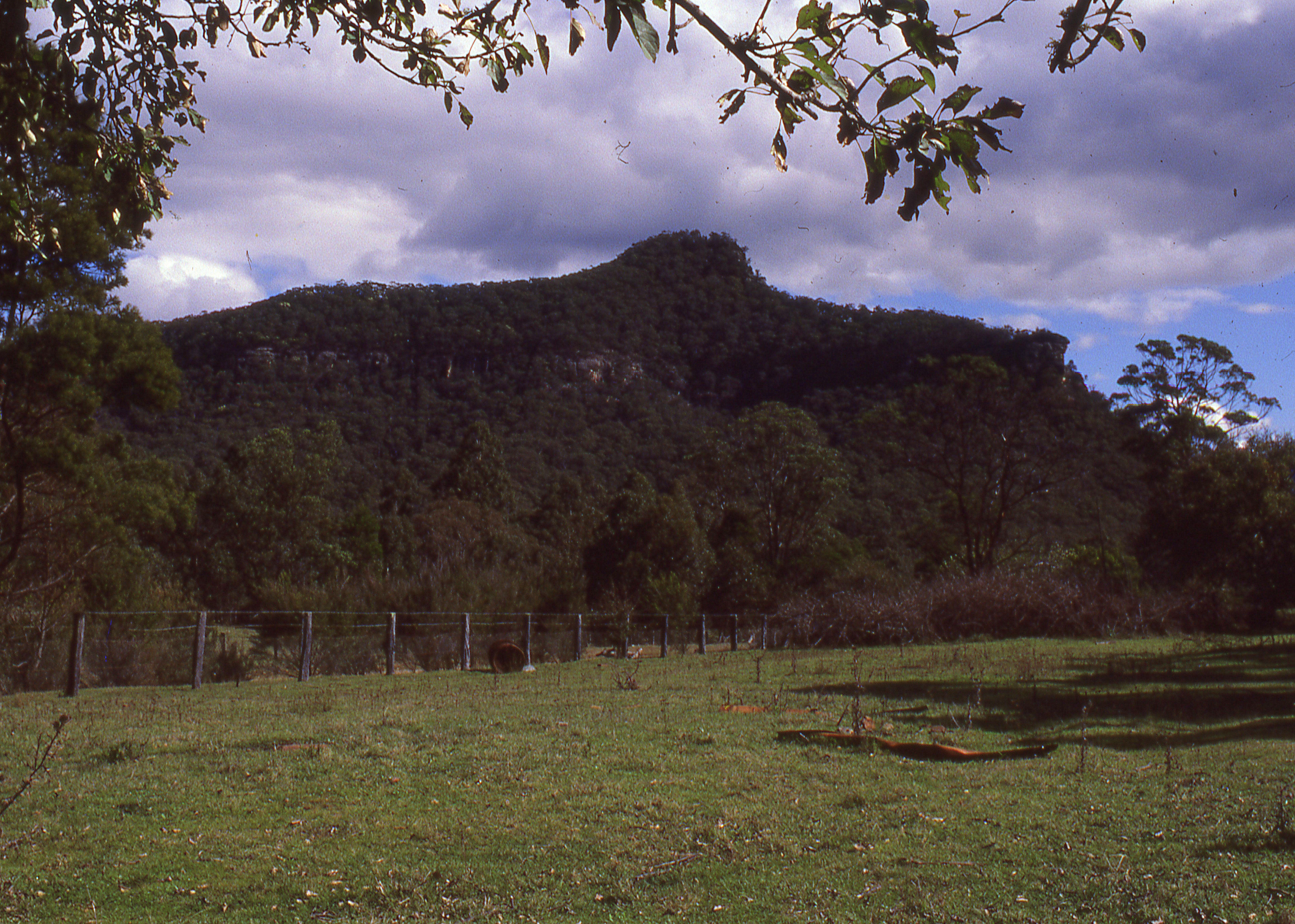
Yerranderie Peak

== See also ==
- Blue Mountains
