= Francis Barrallier =

Australian explorer (1773–1853)

Francis Louis Barrallier
- Born: Louis François Barrallier; 19 October 1773; Toulon, France
- Died: 11 June 1853 (aged 79); London, England
- Occupations: Cartographer; explorer; surveyor; military officer
- Known for: Early exploration of Australia; attempted crossing of the Blue Mountains

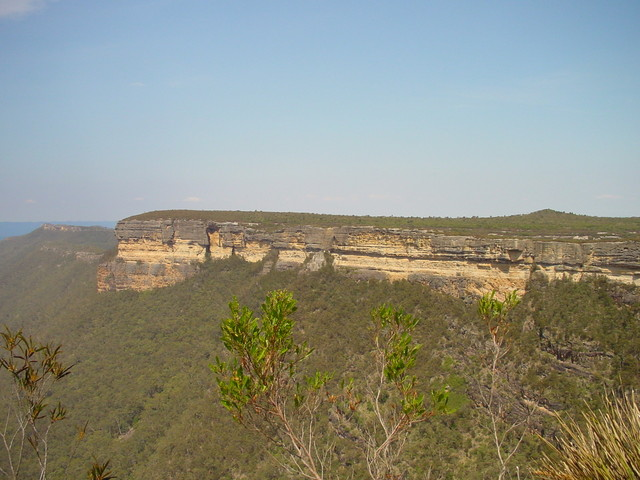
Kanangra-Boyd National Park, the area Barrallier reached in his expedition of 1802

Francis Louis Barrallier (born Louis François Barrallier, 19 October 1773 – 11 June 1853) was a French military officer in the British Army. Born to a monarchist family in Toulon, he was a cartographer, explorer of Australia, and a surveyor.

== Life and career ==
Francis Barrallier was born in Toulon, France, on 19 October 1773, and baptised Louis François Barralier. François Barrallier was a president and his father a vice president of commissioners of different districts of the counter-revolutionary royalist authorities of Toulon. He was the eldest son of Jean-Louis Barrallier, a marine engineer and monarchist, and Marie-Antoinette-Francoise Hernandez. The family fled to the United Kingdom in 1793 during the Siege of Toulon by the republicans. They lived for a time at Milford Haven, in Pembrokeshire, where Jean was employed designing the new port. Francis was trained by his father in engineering and surveying.

Having acquired the patronage of the politician Charles Francis Greville, Francis arrived in New South Wales in November 1799 with hopes of employment. At first he was given miscellaneous tasks including the design of a proposed orphanage at Parramatta. In July 1800 the outgoing Governor of NSW, John Hunter, appointed him an ensign in the New South Wales Corps.

In March 1801, Governor Philip Gidley King sent him with Lieutenant James Grant in HMS Lady Nelson to further explore, survey and map Bass Strait. Barrallier's resulting maps of Jervis Bay, Western Port and some of Bass Strait were recognised by Governor King, who made him the Colony's engineer and artillery officer.

Again in the role of surveyor, in June 1801 he sailed to the Hunter River in an expedition led by Colonel William Paterson. He made a survey of Coal Harbour (now Newcastle) and part of the Hunter and Williams Rivers. Later that year he made a second trip there with surveyor Charles Grimes, and with him surveyed part of the Paterson River.

In October–November 1802 Governor King engaged Barrallier as his personal aide-de-camp, and in that capacity he was directed to try to find a way over the Blue Mountains to the west of Sydney. After a preliminary reconnaissance in September-October, he mounted a major expedition in November, employing a bullock cart to take provisions to a depot that he set up northwest of today's town of Picton. From there he made three incursions into the mountains, accompanied by soldiers, convicts and Aboriginal assistants. The first terminated prematurely in the Burragorang Valley when his principal guide, the Dharawal man Gogy, found himself unwelcome amongst the Gundungurra people whose country they had entered. On the second incursion, with two different Aboriginal assistants, Badbury (Boodbury) and Le Tonsure, he penetrated further west but eventually turned around at Johnston Falls in Wheengee Whungee Creek, six kilometres southwest of Kanangra Walls. The party was short of supplies and low on morale and was far short of crossing the mountains. After a third unsuccessful incursion, which involved an attempt to follow the Wollondilly River upstream, Barrallier returned to Sydney. The expedition had taken 51 days altogether.

During the expedition Barrallier wrote letters to Governor King, and subsequently wrote a long journal, in French. These documents provide an important record of his encounters with the First Nations people he met or who accompanied him, and reveal that Barrallier had an uncommon understanding of their ownership of country. It is likely that his attitudes were influenced in part by his encounters with members of the French Baudin expedition, which visited Sydney in the months before the expedition.

Barrallier made the first record of the brush-tailed rock-wallaby (Petrogale penicillata), which he encountered while trying to scale Tonalli Peak in the Burragorang Valley. He also displayed some knowledge of the science of geology. He also reported the traditional “coo-ee” call, though he was not the first to do so, as the call had been reported by Captain John Hunter in 1789, while on the Hawkesbury River.

In May 1803 Barrallier fell victim of the feuding between Governor King and the New South Wales Corps, and was dismissed as aide-de-camp. He submitted his resignation from the army and left for England. His resignation was never accepted, probably due to the support of Captain John Macarthur and Sir Joseph Banks. He undertook further training in the hope he would return to NSW as surveyor general, but was disappointed in that ambition.

In 1805 he was appointed a lieutenant in the 90th Regiment and the following year joined the regiment at St Vincent in the West Indies, where he was engaged as engineer in charge of building fortifications. In 1809 he earned a silver medal for his role in the invasion of Martinique, and was made a captain in the 101st Regiment. He was then appointed aide-de-camp to General Sir George Beckwith, commander of the English forces in the West Indies, and in 1810 earned another silver medal for his role in the invasion of Guadalupe.

In 1812 Barrallier was instructed to make a survey of Barbados, a task which occupied several years during which he was appointed surveyor general of the island.

He returned to England in 1816 after the Napoleonic Wars concluded, and spent most of the rest of his life on half-pay, gradually advancing to Brevet Lieutenant Colonel. He lived mainly in England, but also in France, having married Isobel Skyrme at Lambeth in 1819.

In 1827 he published his map of Barbados. This map has been significant as it lists the names of all the English owners of the plantations of the time.

Francis Barrallier died in London on 11 June 1853, aged nearly eighty. Barrallier Island, a tiny islet that he would have visited in Western Port, was named after him. Several places in the Blue Mountains also carry his name.

== See also ==
- List of Blue Mountains articles
