= Nepean River =

River in New South Wales, Australia

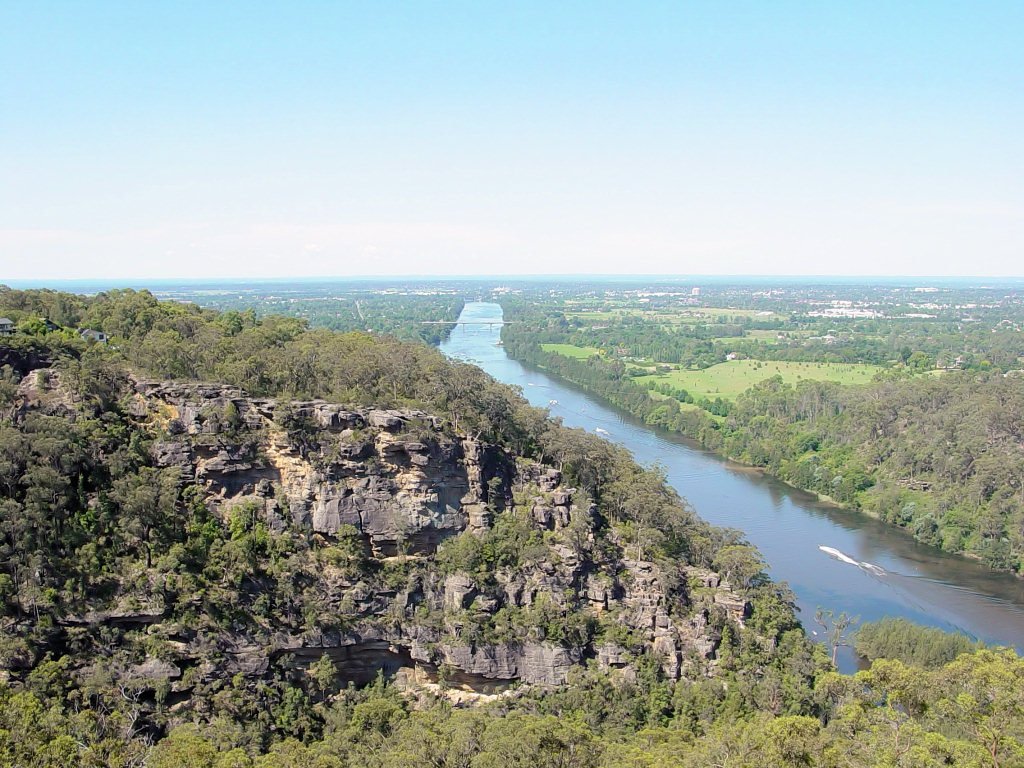
- Nepean River, Looking north towards Penrith, 2006
- Etymology: In honour of Evan Nepean, in 1789
- Native name: Yandhai (Dharuk)

Location
- Country: Australia
- State: New South Wales
- Region: Sydney Basin (IBRA), Southern Highlands, Macarthur, Greater Western Sydney
- District: Wingecarribee, Wollondilly, Camden, Penrith, Hawkesbury
- City: Penrith

Physical characteristics
- Source: Mittagong Range
  - location: near Robertson
  - coordinates: 34°33′59″S 150°36′01″E
  - elevation: 766 m (2,513 ft)
- Mouth: confluence with the Grose River to form the Hawkesbury River
  - location: near Yarramundi
  - coordinates: 33°36′32″S 150°41′58″E
  - elevation: 92 m (302 ft)
- Length: 178 km (111 mi)

Basin features
- River system: Hawkesbury-Nepean catchment
- Tributaries
  - left: Erskine Creek, Breakfast Creek, Warragamba River, Glenbrook Creek
  - right: Burke River, Cordeaux River, Cataract River
- National park: Blue Mountains National Park

Aerial views of Nepean River between Douglas Park and Menangle

The Nepean River (Dharug: Yandhai), is a major perennial river, located in the south-west and west of Sydney, New South Wales, Australia. The Nepean River, and, continuing by its downstream name, the Hawkesbury River, almost encircles the metropolitan region of Sydney.

The headwaters of the Nepean River rise near Robertson, about 100 kilometres (62 mi) south of Sydney and about 15 kilometres (9.3 mi) from the Tasman Sea. The river flows north in an unpopulated water catchment area into Nepean Reservoir, which supplies potable water for Sydney. North of the dam, the river forms the western edge of Sydney, flowing past the town of Camden and the city of Penrith, south of which flowing through the Nepean Gorge. Near Wallacia it is joined by the dammed Warragamba River; and north of Penrith, near Yarramundi, at its confluence with the Grose River, the Nepean becomes the Hawkesbury River.

== Changes to the natural flow of the river ==
The river supplies water to Sydney's five million people as well as supplying agricultural production. This, combined with increased pressures from land use change for urban development, means the river has been suffering significant stress.

There are eleven weirs located on the Nepean River that significantly regulate its natural flow. The river has been segmented into a series of weir lakes rather than a freely flowing river and is also impacted by dams in the Upper Nepean catchment.

The Wallacia Weir was initially built as a wooden weir for the John Blaxland flour mill at Grove Farm. The first Australian fishsteps were built when the current concrete weir was built at the beginning of the Nepean Gorge, an anticendant entrenched meander caused by the slow uplift during the Blue Mountains orogeny carved down through the fifty-million-year-old Hawkesbury sandstone.

In the 1950s, the building of the Warragamba Dam across the steep gorge of the Warragamba River, the Nepean's major tributary, intercepted the flow of the great bulk of its waters and diverted them to meet the needs of the growing Sydney metropolitan area, reducing the river to a shadow of its former self.

These dams and weirs have had a potent effect, blocking migratory native fish like Australian bass (also locally commonly known as perch) from much of their former habitat, and reducing floods and freshets needed for spawning. Nevertheless, the Hawkesbury/Nepean remains an important and popular wild bass fishery.

The luscious banks of the Nepean River provide a natural haven for local flora and fauna and a quiet location for local residents to relax. At Emu Plains, the western bank of the river provides a location for outdoor theatre productions on warm summer nights. The eastern bank at Penrith provides barbecue facilities and children's play equipment, as well as a wide pathway running for several kilometres for strolls along the riverbank. The eastern bank is also the home of the Nepean Rowing Club.

Wallacia Mandi, a Mandaeans mandi (temple) in Wallacia, is located on the west bank of the Nepean River. Water from the Nepean River is pumped into baptismal pools at the mandi for ritual purification.

== History ==
=== Pre-European history ===
Aboriginal people used the river regularly, and their fish traps could be seen at Yarramundi before sand and gravel mining redirected the river. Charles Darwin also wrote of people at Emu Ford, commenting on their skill with spears, while Watkin Tench of the Royal Marines also noted their use of spears, lines and nets to capture fish. The people of the Nepean region also regularly traded with people of the western plains via a route that Bell followed when he laid down an alternate route over the mountains, now called Bells Line of Road.

Near Penrith, since 1971 numerous Aboriginal stone tools were found in Cranebrook Terraces gravel sediments deposited by the Nepean River 40,000 to 50,000 years ago, according to repeated, revised and corroborated radiocarbon and thermoluminescence dating. At first when these results were new they were controversial. More recently in 1987 and 2003 dating of the same sediments strata has revised and corroborated these dates. A great many more artefacts made by people have been found in the region dating back to within the last 5,000 years. Karskens et al. have made an attempt to recover, integrate and map archaeological data of the area from both published and unpublished reports.

=== European settlement ===
When the British colony was established at Sydney in 1788, the Governor, Captain Arthur Phillip, charted the coast 50 km north to the mouth of the Hawkesbury and around 32 km upstream till they were stopped by a waterfall, most likely at Hawkesbury Heights. Phillip named the river after Lord Hawkesbury, later titled Charles Jenkinson, 1st Earl of Liverpool, President of the Privy Council Standing Committee on Trade.

Meanwhile, Lieutenant Watkin Tench set off to walk inland, west of Sydney. About 60 kilometres (37 mi) inland, at the foot of the Blue Mountains, he discovered a large river which he named Nepean after Evan Nepean, the Under Secretary of State at the Home Office and a close personal friend of Arthur Phillip. It took about three years to realise that the Nepean flowed into the Hawkesbury.

Nepean river was also one of the pivotal sites of the Hawkesbury and Nepean Wars, fought between the Kingdom of Great Britain and local aboriginal clans in the late 1700s and early 1800s.

During the 1820s, the Nepean district's most famous early settler, the landowner and physician Sir John Jamison (1776–1844), erected a Georgian mansion, called Regentville House, on the model estate which he had established on a rise overlooking the river, not far from the present-day city of Penrith. Jamison is considered one of early Australia's most important political and agricultural pioneers. A fire devastated the house in the 1860s.

== Crossings ==
Despite forming the effective western and south-western boundary of the metropolitan region of Sydney for its entire length, there are very few fixed crossings of the Nepean River. Going upstream, these comprise:

Crossing name (Unofficial name)	Right bank crossing location	Left bank crossing location	Comments/use	Image
Yarramundi Bridge	Yarramundi	Agnes Banks	Carries the Springwood Road	
Victoria Railway Bridge	Emu Plains	Penrith	Completed in 1907, the bridge carries the electrified and duplicated Main Western railway line.	
Victoria Bridge	Emu Plains	Penrith	Completed in 1867 and listed on the NSW State Heritage Register, the bridge initially carried rail and horse-drawn vehicles, and now the Great Western Highway, with a daily traffic volume of approximately 24,500 vehicles in 2009.	
Yandhai Nepean Crossing	Emu Plains	Penrith	Completed in 2018, the bridge carries pedestrian and cycle traffic.	
Regentville Bridge	Leonay	Regentville	M4 Motorway, and in 2011, carried an average of 55,000 vehicles per day	
	Wallacia		Carries the Silverdale Road	
	Brownlow Hill		Carries the Cobbitty Road	
	Camden	Kirkham	Carries the Macquarie Grove Road, located adjacent to the Camden Airport	
Cowpasture Bridge	Camden	Elderslie	Carries road traffic on the Camden-Narellan Road	
Macarthur Bridge	Camden	Spring Farm	Opened in 1973, this bridge is 1.12 kilometres (0.70 mi) long and carries the Camden Bypass.	
	Menangle	Menangle Park	Carries road traffic on the Menangle Road	
Menangle Railway Bridge	Menangle	Menangle Park	Built in 1864 under the direction of John Whitton, this is the oldest surviving rail bridge in New South Wales; and carries the Main Southern railway line	
	Menangle		Carries road traffic on the Hume Highway	
Douglas Park Bridge	Douglas Park		A pair of concrete bridges that carry road traffic on the Hume Highway	
	Douglas Park		Carries road traffic on the Douglas Park Drive.	
Maldon Bridge	Maldon		Completed in 1980, the concrete beam bridge carries the Picton Road.	
Maldon Suspension Bridge	Maldon		Completed in 1903 and listed on the NSW State Heritage Register, the wooden suspension bridge carried road traffic, and is now closed to all traffic	
Pheasants Nest Bridge	Pheasants Nest		Carries road traffic on the Hume Highway	

== Floods in the Nepean district ==
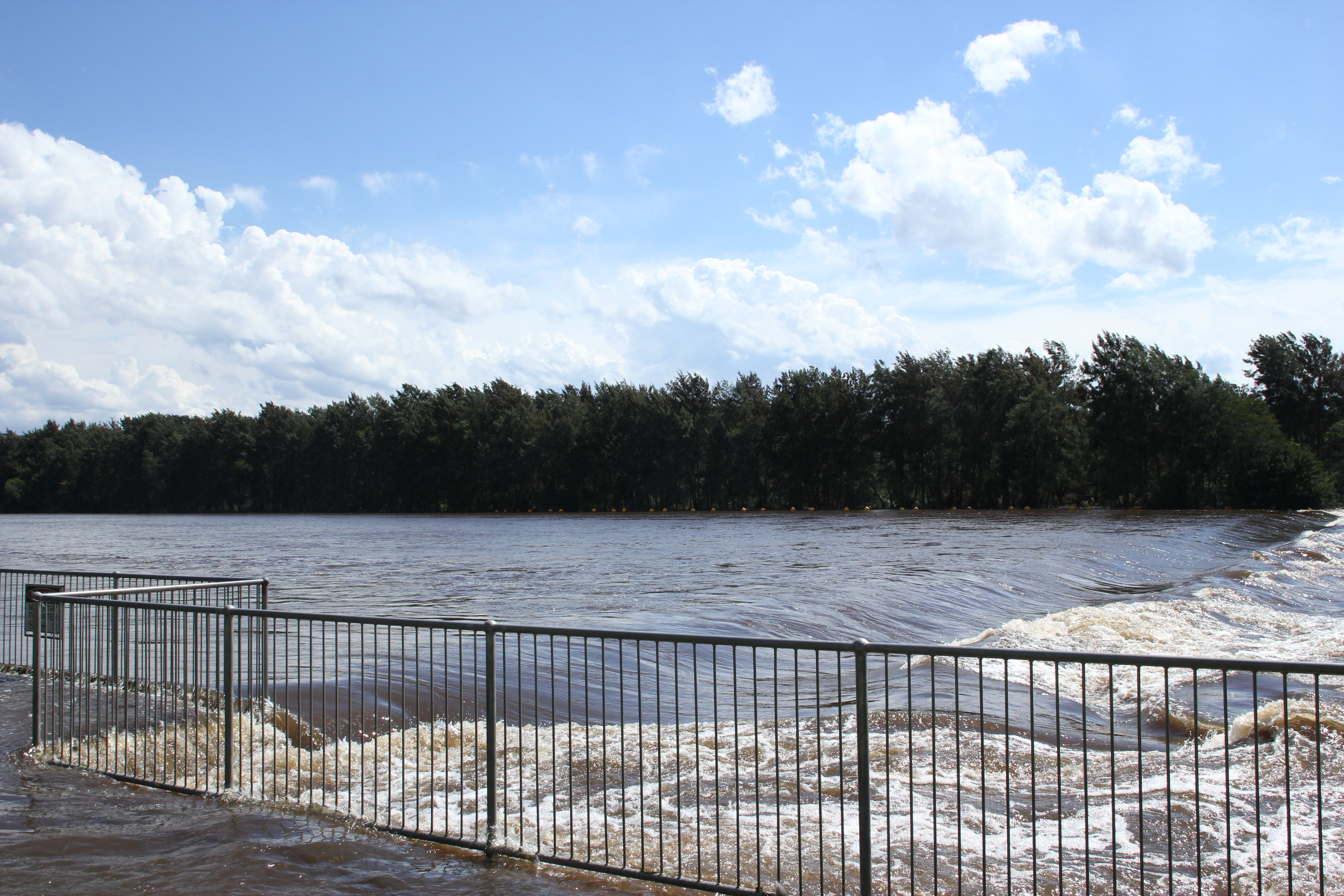
Nepean River, downstream of Victoria Bridge, after heavy rains, 2013

The first flood on record - apparently a small occurrence - was in 1795. Others followed in 1799, March & October 1806 and 1809. In 1810, after a series of major floods on the Hawkesbury, Governor Macquarie proclaimed the ‘Macquarie Towns’ of Windsor, Richmond, Wilberforce, Castlereagh, and Pitt Town in an attempt to ensure that development was restricted to higher ground, free of flooding. The devastation caused by flooding in February 1817 prompted Governor Macquarie to issue a notice exhorting settlers, in the strongest possible terms, to build their residences above the established flood levels.

More flooding occurred in 1857 and twice in 1860, both February and May.

The most devastating flood occurred in June 1867 with the Nepean River estimated to have reached 13.4 metres (44 ft) in the river, and 27.47 metres (90.1 ft) AHD. This flood carried away the approaches to the recently built Victoria Bridge. Emu Plains, Castlereagh, and the lower parts of Penrith were all under flood, causing immense loss of property. Many houses were carried into the river by landslides. Many residents were forced to take refuge in public buildings such as the Penrith Hospital and the public schools. A major flood such as that of 1867 would cause inundation of over 16,000 dwellings and damage costing approximately A$1.4 billion.

There have been other notable floods since, particularly that of July 1900 and March 1914. Again there was much flooding of streets and loss of houses and property along the river.

1974 was another significant La Niña flood event.

During the 2021 New South Wales floods, the Nepean River became overflowed, peaking at 10 m (32.81 ft), with Windsor Bridge submerging in its waters, leading to inundated homes and isolated animals in the surrounds.

== Mandaean ritual use ==
The Australian Mandaean community in the Sydney metropolitan area regularly performs masbuta (baptism) rituals in the Nepean River, typically in and around Wallacia Mandi.

== See also ==
- List of rivers of Australia
- Rivers of New South Wales
- Upper Nepean Scheme
- Geography of Sydney
