= Duall =

Indigenous Australian outlaw and explorer

- Born: c. 1795; Cowpastures, New South Wales, Australia
- Died: c. 1840 (aged approx. 45)
- Occupations: Explorer, guide, interpreter
- Known for: Guiding early Australian expeditions with Hamilton Hume and Charles Throsby
- Children: 1

Duall (c.1795 – c.1840), also known as Dual or Dewall, was an Indigenous Australian of the Gandangara nation who was a leading figure in various exploration parties organised by notable New South Wales colonial figures such as Hamilton Hume and Charles Throsby. He helped to trailblaze routes from Sydney to other areas of the colony including Bathurst, Goulburn, the Illawarra and Jervis Bay.

Despite working with the colonists, Duall also took up a role in resisting British occupation. He was formally outlawed by Governor Lachlan Macquarie and was made prisoner after a British military operation against the Gandangara people which culminated in the Appin massacre. Duall was sentenced to transportation in Van Diemen's Land but later returned to New South Wales where he continued to be employed as an expedition guide.

== Early life ==
Duall was born around 1795 in the area of Gandangara country now known as Mittagong in the Southern Highlands of New South Wales. It has been stated that he possibly was of Dharawal descent but he was always associated with Gandangara people in early documentation even though he later resided on the borders of Dharawal land around what is now Camden.

== Early association with Hamilton Hume ==
On becoming a young man, Duall was brought into the British colonial lifestyle as the frontier approached his homeland. From around 1812, he became associated with the Hume and Kennedy families who had been given land grants near Appin. Like most colonists, the Humes and the Kennedys were interested in identifying more land for acquisition, and Duall was able to act as a guide for them, conducting small expeditions into Gandangara country.

In 1814, Duall guided John Kennedy and a young Hamilton Hume as far as the region called Berrima.

Duall was likely, at least partially, motivated by a long drought in the region which, in addition the strain from the arrival of colonists and the displacement of Aboriginal people from their lands, put pressure on existing resources.

== Frontier conflict and Duall declared an outlaw ==
In the same year, conflict between the Gandangara and the British flared. British settlers on Gandangara land around Appin were angered that the Aboriginal people were taking crops grown by them. In May, a small group of British soldiers fired upon some Gandangara plundering corn near Mallaty Creek, killing a boy. The Gandangara immediately fought back and were able to kill one of the soldiers named Isaac Eustace. A punitive expedition was later organised by some of the colonists, which surprised a woman and her two infants sleeping at camp-site. This was the wife and children of a Gandangara man named Bitugally and they were subsequently killed and their bodies mutilated by the colonists.

Bitugally was a close kinsman of Duall, and these two men in conjunction with fellow Gandangara men named Yellooming, Wallah and Murrah were implicated in conducting a number of revenge attacks on the settlers. Duall appears to have been directly involved in the killing of two convict farm workers at Lachlan Vale near Appin in June 1814.

Small scale hostilities continued in the region for the next year and a half until, in March 1816, a major outbreak of violence re-ignited at Silverdale where the colonists were defeated in a skirmish resulting in four settlers being killed.

In response, Governor Lachlan Macquarie organised a military operation to "inflict exemplary and severe punishments" on the Gandangara people. He published a list of eight "hostile bad natives" whom he considered ringleaders of the resistance which included Duall. Macquarie then assembled three detachments of soldiers to scour the region for these outlaws and their associates in order to force their surrender or kill them. Macquarie directed that if the outlaws were killed, their corpses were "to be hung up on trees in conspicuous situations to strike the survivors with the greater terror".

Duall successfully sort refuge with John Kennedy at his farm and was also protected by the well-known colonists Charles Throsby and D'arcy Wentworth, who wrote letters to the authorities defending Duall's character and outlining his usefulness to them. In this way, Duall was able to avoid being hunted down by the military and did not share in the fate of at least fourteen of his compatriots, including Cannabaygal, who were killed by the soldiers of Captain James Wallis during the Appin massacre.

== Taken prisoner and exiled to Van Diemen's Land ==
After the Appin massacre, Duall was located by the soldiers at Kennedy's farm and together with fifteen other Aboriginal men, women and children. He was taken prisoner on 22 April 1816 and sent to Liverpool Gaol. Within a month, all the prisoners except for Duall were released.

Macquarie considered Duall to be a dangerous individual and considered executing him but eventually commuted his punishment to being transported to Van Diemen's Land for seven years of hard labour. Macquarie thought his banishment would "produce a greater dread" than death upon the Aboriginal people.

Duall arrived in Launceston in August 1816 as a convict. It appears that while under sentence there, he was utilised as an Aboriginal tracker to find runaway convicts and bushrangers. It is possible that in 1818 he worked with a fellow Aboriginal convict from Sydney named Musquito in helping to track down the famous outlaw Michael Howe.

== Return to New South Wales and his role in exploration ==
At the request of Charles Throsby, Duall's sentence was reduced to two and half years and he was returned to New South Wales to assist Throsby and others in the exploration of Gandangara country and adjacent areas. He arrived in Sydney in January 1819 and in April of that year, he was given a leading role in guiding Throsby through the southern highlands to the Bathurst region. For his work, Governor Macquarie's opinion of Duall improved immensely and he rewarded Duall and another Gandangara guide named Cookoogong with Aboriginal breastplates.

Duall also took part in several expeditions conducted by Hamilton Hume to map out routes from south-west Sydney to the coastal areas of the Shoalhaven River and Jervis Bay. He continued his association with Hume in 1821 by accompanying him on journeys of exploration to what is now Goulburn and Lake Bathurst.

== Later life ==
By 1824, Duall was residing near Camden with the remnants of the local clans of Gandangara and Dharawal people. He had a wife and child and was recognised as a leader of the area's Aboriginal population.

Duall was killed in an inter-tribal fight with an Illawarra based clan of Dharawal people probably around 1840.

== See also ==
- List of Indigenous Australian historical figures
