= Hawkesbury and Nepean Wars =

Australian frontier conflict

- Part of the Australian frontier wars
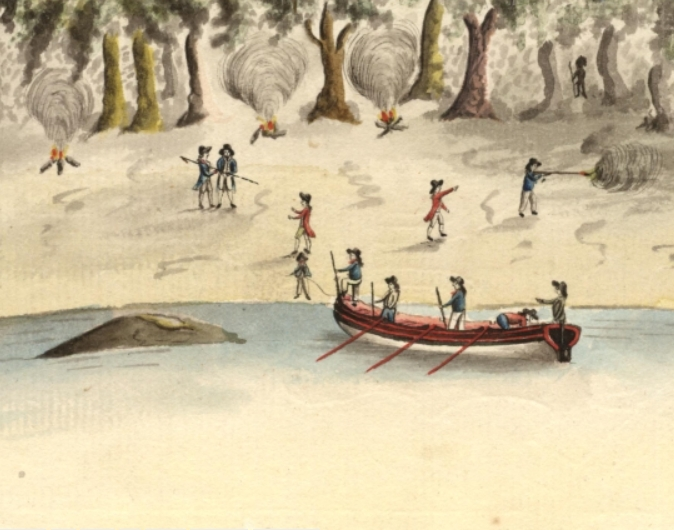
- Governor Arthur Phillip speared during a skirmish at Manly (1790).
Date	1794–1816
Location	Sydney metropolitan area
Result	British victory: Dispossession of land of the indigenous clans

Belligerents
Kingdom of Great Britain (1795–1800): (Kingdom of Great Britain) New South Wales Corps (1795–1800); Burraberongal Tribe; United Kingdom of Great Britain and Ireland (1801–16): (United Kingdom) New South Wales Corps (1801–10)	Indigenous clans: Dharug Nation; Eora Nation; Tharawal Nation; Gandangara Nation; Irish-convict sympathizers

Commanders and leaders
(Kingdom of Great Britain) George III (Kingdom of Great Britain) John Hunter (1795–1800) (United Kingdom) Philip Gidley King (1800–06) (United Kingdom) William Bligh (1806–08) (United Kingdom) Lachlan Macquarie (1810–23) (United Kingdom) William Paterson (1794–1809) (United Kingdom) James Wallis (1814–16)	Pemulwuy †; Tedbury †; Yaragowhy †; Woglomigh †; Obediah Ikins; Musquito (POW); John Wilson; William Knight

Strength
(United Kingdom) New South Wales Corps (1790–1810): 550 (United Kingdom) 73rd Regiment of Foot (1810–14): 450 (United Kingdom) 46th Regiment of Foot (1814–16): 600+ Armed settlers: 2,000+ Burreberongal Tribe (1790–1802) 100+ Combined total force: 3,600	Indigenous clan numbers: approx. 3,000; About 10+ armed Irish convicts 2 or more bushrangers

Casualties and losses
Total Casualties: ~300 ('conservative estimate') Dead: at least 80 confirmed Wounded: bare minimum of 74	Dead: 80 confirmed (many likely went unrecorded) Wounded: +100

The Hawkesbury and Nepean Wars (1794–1816) were a series of conflicts where British forces, including armed settlers and detachments of the British Army in Australia, fought against Indigenous clans inhabiting the Hawkesbury River region and the surrounding areas to the west of Sydney. The wars began in 1794, when the British started to construct farms along the river, some of which were established by soldiers.

The local Darug people raided farms and murdered settlers until Governor Macquarie dispatched troops from the 46th Regiment of Foot in 1816. These troops patrolled the Hawkesbury Valley and ended the conflict by killing 14 Indigenous Australians in a raid on their campsite. Indigenous Australians led by Pemulwuy also conducted raids around Parramatta during the period between 1795 and 1802. These attacks led Governor Philip Gidley King to issue an order in 1801 which authorised settlers to shoot Indigenous Australians on sight in Parramatta, Georges River and Prospect areas.

Many of the Aboriginal nations occasionally allied themselves to the British settlers in order to conquer more land for their tribes, and just as quickly returned to a state of war against the settlers. The Indigenous Australians fought in the Hawkesbury and Nepean Wars using mostly guerrilla-warfare tactics; however, several conventional battles also took place. The engagement resulted in the defeat of the Hawkesbury river and Nepean river Indigenous clans who were subsequently dispossessed of their lands.

With the expansion of European settlement, large amounts of land was cleared for farming, which resulted in the destruction of Aboriginal food sources. This, combined with the introduction of new diseases such as smallpox, caused resentment within the Aboriginal clans against the settlers and resulted in violent confrontations, coordinated by men such as Pemulwuy.

== Background ==
=== Aboriginal people of the Sydney region ===
The Sydney region comprised a variety of nations that were united by a common language. These nations were the Eora who lived along the coast, the Tharawal to the south, the Dharug to the northwest and the Gandagara to the southwest. Within the language groups there were several clans. The Eora people generally comprised three main clans known as the Cadigal, Wanegal, and the Cammeraygal, and several smaller ones. The Dharug people, however, were the largest dialect of the Sydney region and consisted of the Wangal, Kurrajong, Boorooberongal, Cattai, Bidjigal, Gommerigal, Mulgoa, Cannemegal, Bool-bain-ora, Cabrigal, Muringong and the Dural clans. A clan typically numbered between 50 and 100 people.

=== The colony ===
Following Britain's loss of its American colonies during the American Revolutionary War, economic situations in Britain forced it to establish new colonies. After explorer James Cook wrote that he had claimed the east coast of Australia for Britain when standing on Possession Island in 1770, it was decided that a penal colony would be set up there to help relieve Britain's jails as well as to prevent French influence from growing in the Pacific.

The arrival of the First Fleet in 1788 at Port Jackson marked the beginning of the colonization of Australia. At the time it was used as a penal colony to which criminals and political dissidents were sent as punishment, however, a small number of free settlers also took up land. The penal colony had been established at Port Jackson (present-day Sydney) which was the traditional land of the Cadigal people. The penal colony had a population of around one thousand and for the first few years struggled to adapt to the Australian climate.

== Conflicts ==
=== 1789: Skirmish at Botany Bay ===
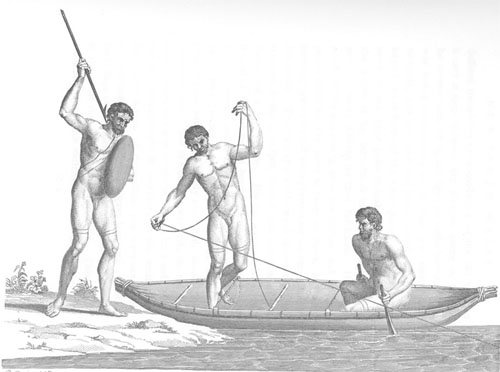
Aboriginal men hunting at Botany Bay (1789).

In March 1789, sixteen convicts marched to Botany Bay with the intention of plundering the natives of their fishing-tackle and spears. They had armed themselves with whatever tools they could find such as hatchets, shovels, and clubs. As they arrived near the bay a body of natives ambushed them, and in the skirmish most of the convicts fled.

Those who fled back to the camp alerted the military to the attack. An officer with a detachment of marines quickly rushed to their aid, however they were too late to repel the natives which left one convict dead and seven severely wounded. Arthur Phillip sought no vengeance against the natives for this event as the convicts had hostile intentions, and instead dealt punishments on the convicts involved.

=== 1789 Hawkesbury Clans meet Bereewolgal ===
In July 1789 Governor Phillip's group met the first two Indigenous men from the area. They exchanged gifts of animal hair and a spear for a hatchet and newly shot duck. The spear was refused, as it appeared to the party to be an item of necessity for the tribesman. The clans called the Hawkesbury river Dee-rab-bun, recorded variously as Deerubbun and Dyarubbin.

=== 1790: Attack on Governor Phillip ===
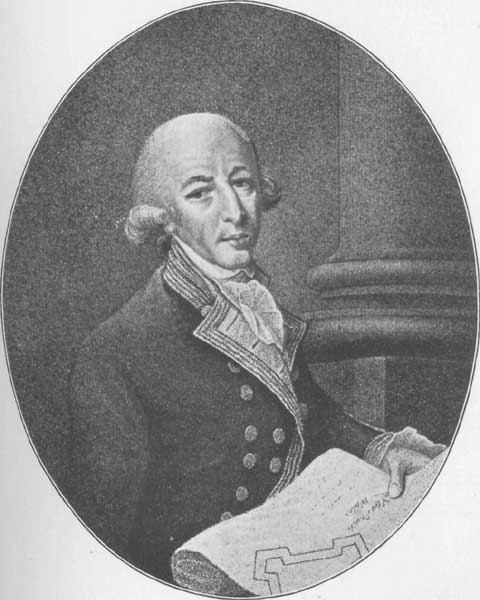
Despite being attacked, Governor Arthur Phillip ordered that Aboriginals must be well-treated, and that anyone killing Aboriginal people would be hanged.

On 7 September 1790, upon hearing news of a gathering of natives at South-head near Broken Bay, Governor Phillip and three others made their way towards the reported happenings. When the boat arrived at Manly Cove, the natives were found busily consuming on a whale. Governor Phillip stepped out unarmed and accompanied by one seaman, Lieutenant Waterhouse.

Phillip called out for Bennelong, a native whom he befriended, and discoursed for some time at the pleasure of seeing his old acquaintance. Gifts were traded between them and continued for more than half an hour until a native armed with a spear came forward and stopped at a distance of twenty to thirty yards from the party. Phillip extended his hand and called to him, advancing at the same time. However, as the governor came nearer to the native it only seemed to terrify him further and subsequently fixed his lance in his throwing-stick and aimed it at him.

Phillip thought to retreat would be more dangerous than to advance and so he called out "Weeree Weeree" (bad; you are doing wrong). Watkin Tench reports in his journal that Phillip took out his dirk (dagger) and threw it on the ground to show he meant no harm but the aboriginal man was frightened by the noise of this action. His words fell on deaf ears and the native fired his lance, striking the governor on his right shoulder, as the native immediately retreated into the woods. Instant confusion on both sides took place as spears were thrown in all directions, and Phillips party retreated to the boat. On board the vessel, a seaman fired his musket into the natives but it is not known if any were killed.

Apprehension for the safety of the party took place and Lieutenant Long and a detachment of marines were immediately sent to escort them back in case a native ambush were to finish the party off. Upon arriving at Manly Cove, they were greeted by three natives who said that the man who had wounded the governor belonged to a tribe from the Broken Bay area and that they highly condemned what he had done. It was later discovered that Wileemarin was responsible for the attack. Tench reports that it was a "misapprehension" and placed no blame on Wileemarin. Governor Phillip survived his wounds and ordered that there were to be no retaliatory attacks made against the natives, arguing that it was just a mistake.

=== 1790, Murder of John McIntyre ===
On 9 December 1790, a marine sergeant and three convicts, including the governor's gamekeeper, McIntyre, went out on a shooting party. After they passed the northern arm of Botany Bay they decided to stay at a hut formed of boughs which had been erected by other sportsmen who hunted for game at night. At about 1:00 am the sergeant was awakened by rustling bushes and assuming it to be from a kangaroo called to his comrades, who immediately drew their weapons.

However, on closer inspection the origin of the noise was found to be two natives armed with spears. McEntire attempted to defuse the situation by laying down his gun and telling his comrades not to be afraid. He then began speaking with the natives in their own language, and they slowly retreated about 100 yards (91 m) as McEntire followed them. Without warning, one of the natives jumped on a fallen tree and launched his spear at McEntire, which lodged in his left side. McEntire immediately withdrew to rejoin his party and alerted them to what had happened. Two of the armed marines set out in pursuit of the natives but they had already escaped. They then escorted the wounded man back to the colony, arriving in Sydney at 2 am the next morning. Surgeons examined McEntire's wound and proclaimed that it was mortal. Following this, McEntire apparently confessed of "crimes of the deepest dye", although he denied killing any natives.

Colbee and several other natives came to visit McEntire, telling him that it had been Pemulwuy who had attacked him and that he lived at Botany Bay. The surgeons wanted to remove the spear but the natives violently opposed this, saying that he would die if the shaft was taken out. However, on 12 December it was deemed necessary and so the surgeons successfully removed it. The spear penetrated McEntire about 7-and-a-half inches through his ribs and into the left lobe of his lungs. The spear itself consisted of a wooden barb with several smaller barbs made from stone fastened onto it with yellow gum. McEntire eventually died on 20 December 1790.

=== 1790–1791: Governor Phillip's military expeditions ===
"The Natives of the Hawkesbury... lived on the wild yams on the banks. Cultivation has rooted out these, and poverty compelled them to steal Indian corn... They [soldiers and settlers] came upon them [natives] unarmed, and unexpected, killed and wounded many more. The dead they hang on gibbets, in terrorem. The war may be universal on the part of the blacks, whose improvement and civilisation will be a long time deferred. The people killed were unfortunately the most friendly of the blacks, and one of them more than once saved the life of a white man."

— Rev Thomas Fyshe Palmer (3 June 1796)

Governor Phillip was convinced the attack on McEntire had been unprovoked. There had been similar attacks against unarmed men in the past, in which some settlers had been killed or seriously wounded, and he believed that the natives had to be punished to deter them from any future attacks. Phillip ordered Lieutenant Tench to gather his company of marines and lead an expedition against the Bidjigal in retaliation for the attack on McIntyre. He ordered that two Bidjigal were to be captured and ten killed; these ten were then to be beheaded and the heads returned to the settlement. Tench swiftly suggested an alternative and less bloodthirsty plan, that six Bidjigal be captured and brought to Sydney Cove but that none be killed out of hand.

Tench's proposal was accepted, although Phillip ordered that if it was not possible to capture six Bidjigal alive, they were to be killed. The expedition was also to destroy all weapons of war, but were given strict instructions not to destroy anything else and were not to harm any women and children. Governor Phillip reasoned that seventeen convicts had been either killed or wounded since 1788 and he firmly believed the Bidjigal to be the principal aggressors. The goal of the military expedition, according to the governor, was "to convince them of...[British]...superiority and to infuse an universal terror, which might operate to prevent farther mischief". At the same time, he declared it unlawful for soldiers or settlers to injure or fire on a native except in self-defence, or to take any of their possessions.

The expedition set out on 14 December. It was the largest military operation since the founding of the colony, comprising Tench, Lieutenants William Dawes and John Poulden, and 46 marines. The first sighting of natives occurred at a beach head from where five managed to escape. Shortly after, the expedition marched into a small native village which had already been deserted, and three canoes filled with natives were seen making their way across to the opposite side of the river. After searching the village, no weapons of war were found. On 17 December after three days of unsuccessful searching Tench ordered a return to Sydney Cove to gather supplies.

A second expedition set out in the late afternoon of 22 December comprising Tench, two officers, three sergeants, three corporals, and thirty private marines, under the same orders. It had been decided that an attack on the village would be made at night and at sunset the company forded the Cooks River and continued south towards Wolli Creek. The waterway was reached at 2:15 am but the majority of marines seeking to cross it became stuck in mud along its banks. Tench himself was trapped waist-deep in the mud and had to be pulled to land on the end of a tree branch. A stock-take of equipment subsequently showed around half of the company's muskets had become unserviceable from exposure to the mud and water. After a few hours rest on the riverbank the detachment continued and arrived at the village just before sunrise. Tench split his forces into three divisions, with each division converging on the village at the same time from different directions. When they arrived, once again they found the village deserted.

The expeditions having failed, it was decided to instead avenge McIntyre by strictly punishing any Aboriginal considered to have transgressed against the settlement's laws. In late December two natives were detected robbing a potato farm. A sergeant and a party of soldiers pursued them and after overtaking them, a brief skirmish occurred which left one native man, Bangai, mortally wounded and resulted in three others being captured.

=== 1793–1802: Initial Hawkesbury settlement ===
The first land grants were allocated in 1794 and can be seen in the Land Grant register 1, and also in John Hunter's "An Account of Lands Granted or Leased in His Majesty's Territory of New South Wales and Its Dependencies by His Excellency, Governor Hunter from the 1st August, 1796, to the 1st January 1800."

During this time there were minor skirmishes between Indigenous clans, and settlers. The complexity of these interactions show the differences from a cultural perspective between Aboriginal tribal law and the European rule of law at the time.

Below are listed the conflict deaths from Jan Barkely-Jack's "Hawkesbury Settlement Revealed".

Year	Aboriginal Deaths	Settler Deaths
1794	8, 9, or 10	1
1795	14 or 15	5
1796	0	4
1797	3 or 4	2
1798	1	4
1799	4	2
1800	0	0
1801	0	0
1802	0	0

Total deaths over the first 9 years of the Hawkesbury settlement were 30–34 Aboriginal people and 18 Europeans.

In 1799, several high-profile and responsible Hawkesbury settlers, under oath gave assessments that were similar to those above tallied from existing sources.

Note: These figures do not include a soldier killed at Broken Bay, and two killings north of Toongabbie allegedly by Major White and his clan.

=== 1804–1805: Interwar conflict ===
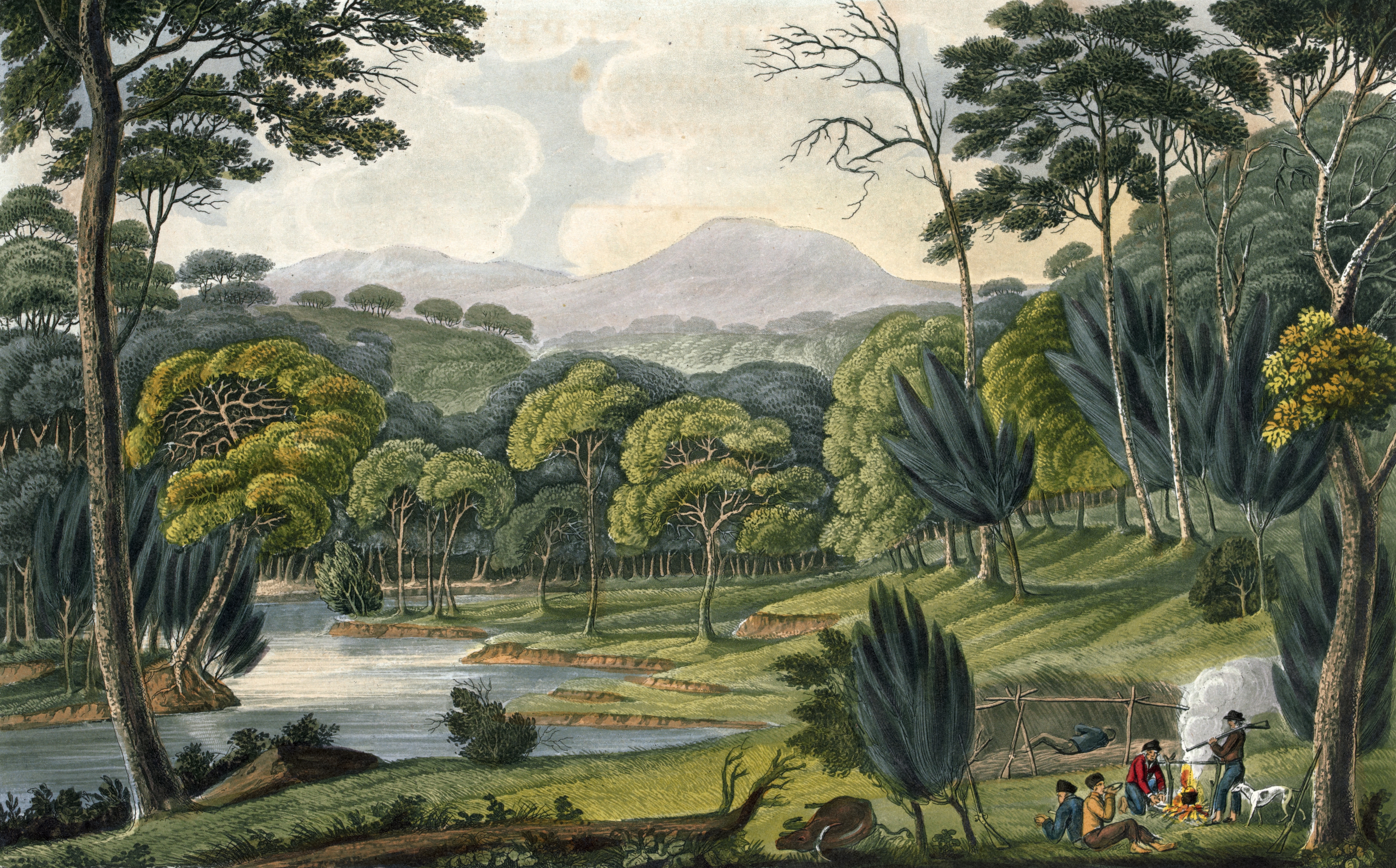
Nepean river, 1825.

Along the Hawkesbury and Nepean Rivers there was a nexus between drought, the expansion of settlement and fighting between settlers and Aboriginal people. Drought began in 1803. In 1803, Philip Gidley King allocated 4,435 acres, nearly twice as much the previous record of 2,631 acres in 1799. In 1804, he allocated 10,000 acres in land grants and over 20,000 acres in commons on the Hawkesbury. Land grants were made where there was easy access to water, particularly the creeks and paleochannels along the Hawkesbury and Nepean Rivers. Conflict was inevitable as these areas were important food sources for Aboriginal people. The only records of conflict in 1804–05 come from Governor King's despatches and the Sydney Gazette, which was an official newspaper. Unlike other periods there are no other sources to balance the official accounts.

In 1803, settlement was extended down stream of Windsor to Portland Head by the Coromandel settlers, non-conformist free settlers who arrived on the Coromandel. Fighting broke out there in May 1804. Matthew Everingham, his wife and servant on their Sackville Reach farm; and John Howe on his Swallow Rock Reach farm were wounded. Governor King sent troops with orders for constables and settlers to support the Portland Head settlers. In June there was a stand off between 300 warriors and a group of settlers in which no casualties were reported. In the same month a settler was speared; crops from the farms of Bingham and Smith were taken; John Wilkin was speared and the farms of Cuddie and Crumby on South Creek, at what is now Llandilo, were burnt by a group of 150 warriors who spared the life of a convict there. Joseph Kennedy fired on Aboriginal people taking corn from his fields on the Upper Crescent Reach, as did James Dunn on Portland Reach. The 1804 fighting stopped in mid-June with the killing of the Aboriginal warriors, Major White and Terribandy, somewhere around Richmond Hill.

In mid-April 1805, Branch Jack led attacks upon isolated Hawkesbury River farms killing three settlers. General orders were issued sending New South Wales Corps soldiers to the frontier farms and banning Aboriginal people from the farms. The government farm at Seven Hills was attacked and two of Elizabeth Macarthurs's stockmen at her Seven Hills Farm were killed. An attack on the William and Mary at Pittwater was thwarted and two salt boilers thought killed were escorted back to Sydney by Aboriginal people. In early May 1805, the Bidjigal people around Prospect sued for peace. The most intense fighting occurred in mid May with more attacks on boats at Pitt Water, attacks on farms at Seven Hills and Concord, and attacks on travellers at Homebush. Andrew Thompson led an attack on Aboriginal camps near the junction of the Nepean, Grose and Hawkesbury Rivers. Tedbury, son of Pemulwuy, was captured near Pennant Hills. In June, the fighting continued on the Hawkesbury and Georges Rivers and South Creek. The fighting appears to have ceased with the apprehension of the Aboriginal warrior, Musquito, in late June. Five white men were killed in 1805. The Governor's report of six Aboriginal casualties in the fighting should be treated with caution.

=== Hawkesbury Nepean War 1814–16 ===
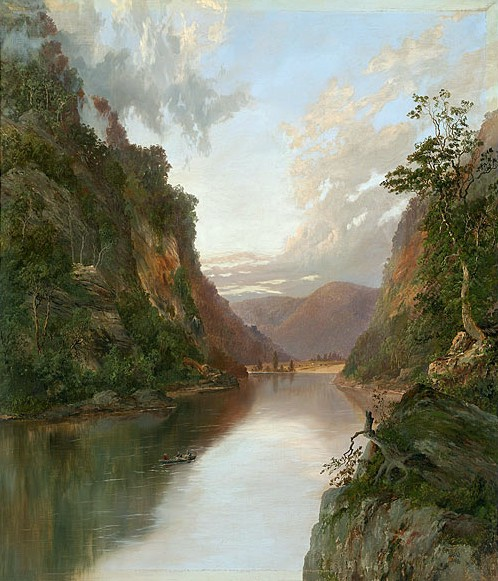
The Hawkesbury and Nepean Rivers, 1881

There are more sources for the fighting on the Nepean and Hawkesbury Rivers, than for the earlier 1804–05 conflict, reflecting the greater literacy levels of the free settlers, officials and clergy taking up large land grants, not just along the waterfronts but on the land between the creeks and rivers. A severe drought beginning in 1812 put additional pressure on both settlers and Aboriginal people. William Reardon, the first to die in February 1814, appears to have been speared in mistake for another man who accused some Aboriginal men of destroying his vegetable garden on Cox's Fernhill estate at Mulgoa. In April 1814, a number of farms were attacked including Fernhill and Campbell's Shancarmore.

Fighting in 1814 in the Appin district appears to have centred around a number of farms and individuals. An Aboriginal boy was killed by three Veteran Company soldiers while taking corn, probably on Broughton's farm. Warriors drove two of the soldiers off and killed private Eustace as he was reloading and mangled his body. In response a group of Campbelltown settlers fired into an Aboriginal camp, killing a woman and two children. The woman's body was mutilated and one of the dead children had been both shot and beaten. John Kennedy buried the bodies on his farm, an act of kindness that may have saved the life of a young girl who was on the spot when Aboriginal warriors killed two of the killers of the woman and children near Kennedy's farm.

Wallah, the leader of these warriors also spared the life of the girl's brother because their mother Mrs Byrnes had given food to Aboriginal people. Hannibal Macarthur wrote to his uncle in mid May telling him that Aboriginal warriors had killed a man and woman on their Cowpasture farm and that escaped convicts were involved in the attacks. Governor Macquarie's response was measured, sending out a small party of soldiers and warning the settlers against further provocation. In July 1814 two children on the Daly's Mulgoa farm were killed after Mrs Daly fired at a party of Aboriginal people. Mrs Daly and her infant were spared. The only conflict in 1815 appeared to be the spearing of a man and a woman on Macarthur's Bringelly farm as a result of an argument over a blanket.

The drought broke in January 1816 and there were a number of floods during the year. Fighting broke out in March 1816. Four men were killed while pursuing Aboriginal warriors who had taken crops from Palmer's Bringelly farm. The lives of a man and a woman were spared when warriors took crops from Wright's farm on the following day. An attack was made on the government camp at Glenroy on the western side of the Blue Mountains and the government cart on its way there was also attacked. On the Grose River Mrs Lewis and a convict were killed in a dispute over wages. At the end of the month between eighty and ninety warriors attacked farms at Lane Cove.

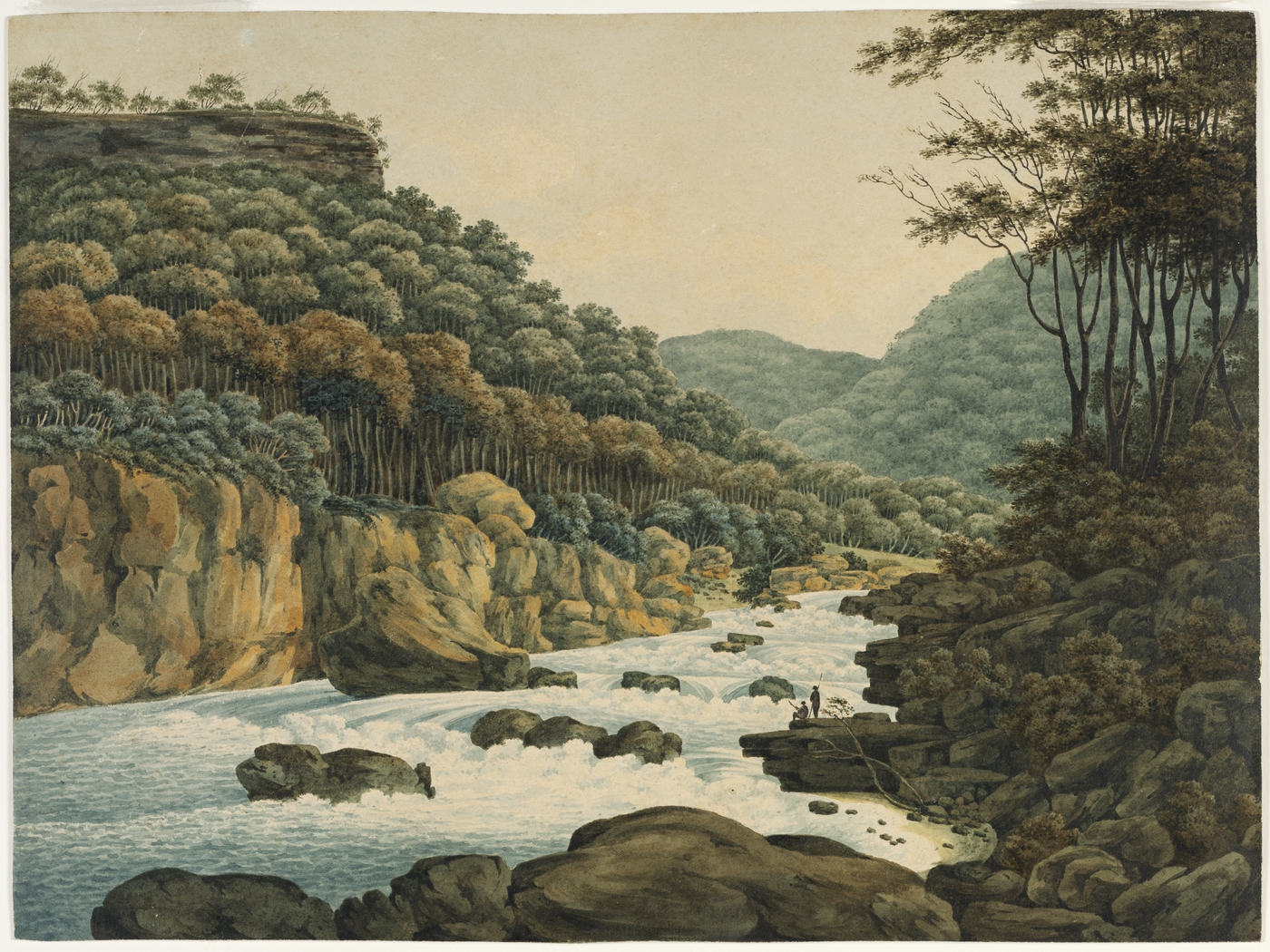
Grose Valley, 1809

Governor Macquarie ordered out several parties of the 46th regiment in April 1816. Captain James Wallis went south to Appin, Captain Schaw to the Hawkesbury and Lieutenant Dawe was detached to the Cow pastures. Soldiers were sent to protect the Glenroy depot. The role of the guides points to the complex nature of the hostilities. Schaw unsuccessfully chased a handful of warriors around the Hawkesbury and after a white guide failed to guide the soldiers in a surprise attack on a camp at Maroota he marched south to the Cow Pastures. When the nature of Wallis' military expedition became clear to the Aboriginal guides, Bundle and Bootbarrie or Budburry, they left Captain Wallis. John Warby, a white guide, also disappeared for a time from Wallis' command. Captain Schaw's pursuit of a party of warriors on the Wingecarribee River ended after Colebee told him that the tracks of the warriors were two days old.

The Appin Massacre came about because local settlers guided Captain Wallis to an Aboriginal camp containing women and children near Broughton's farm, suggesting that attacks upon Aboriginal people were opportunistic. Despite the lack of orders regarding decapitation, the skull of Carnimbeigle ended up in the hands of the Edinburgh phrenologist, Sir George Mackenzie. Many years after the killings William Byrne wrote that the bodies of sixteen Aboriginal people were decapitated and the soldiers were rewarded for their actions.

Governor Macquarie's May 1816 Proclamation ordered magistrates and troops at Sydney, Parramatta and Windsor to support settlers in driving off hostile Aboriginal people. The proclamation had the effect of indemnifying soldiers and settlers against charges of murder. Serjeant Broadfoot carried out two sweeps of the Nepean without reporting casualties in May. On his second expedition he reported meeting Magistrate Lowe in the field with a party of the 46th at Bents Basin on the Nepean. This is the only report of Lowe being in the field. Four settlers were killed on the Kurrajong slopes in June and July. Magistrate William Cox put parties of soldiers, settlers and native guides in the field capturing and killing Butta Butta, Jack Straw and Port Head Jamie in mid July. At least three of these men were executed without trial. The fighting extended in August. Four Aboriginal children from the Hawkesbury were put in the Native Institution. They were probably picked up in unreported raids. In late August two hundred of Cox's sheep and a shepherd were killed at Fernhill. The expedition sent out in response reported no casualties.

=== Aftermath ===
Settlers were driven from their Hunter Valley farms in late 1816. In September 1816 Magistrate William Cox outlined his plan to Governor Macquarie to put five parties of soldiers, settlers and guides into the field to scour the Grose, Hawkesbury and Nepean Rivers. There were no reports of Aboriginal casualties from these expeditions. Despite the apparent lack of Aboriginal casualties fighting ceased on the Hawkesbury Nepean River system in 1816. Governor Macquarie was generous in his rewards. Cox received payments in October 1816 and February 1817. Serjeant Broadfoot also received two payments. The guides received land grants for their services. Breastplates were made for Aboriginal guides. Macquarie's April 1817 report to Bathurst, while highlighting the success of his measures, made no mention of Aboriginal casualties.

Apart from the silence of the land there are other records that point to something catastrophic happening to the Aboriginal people of the Hawkesbury Nepean in 1816. The Macarthur letters noted the absence of Aboriginal people upon their return in 1817. George Bowmans' 1824 memorandum to Magistrate Scott recalled soldiers indiscriminately killing Aboriginal people. The ministers, Threlkeld and Lang, both heard stories of killings on the Hawkesbury. Prosper Tuckerman recalled his father tell him that 400 Aboriginal people had been killed at that time. In 1834, John Dunmore Lang wrote: "There is black blood at this moment on the hands of individuals of good repute in the colony of New South Wales of which all the waters of New Holland would be insufficient to wash out the indelible stains."
