= Lachlan Macquarie =

Colonial administrator (1762–1824)

Major-General Lachlan Macquarie CB
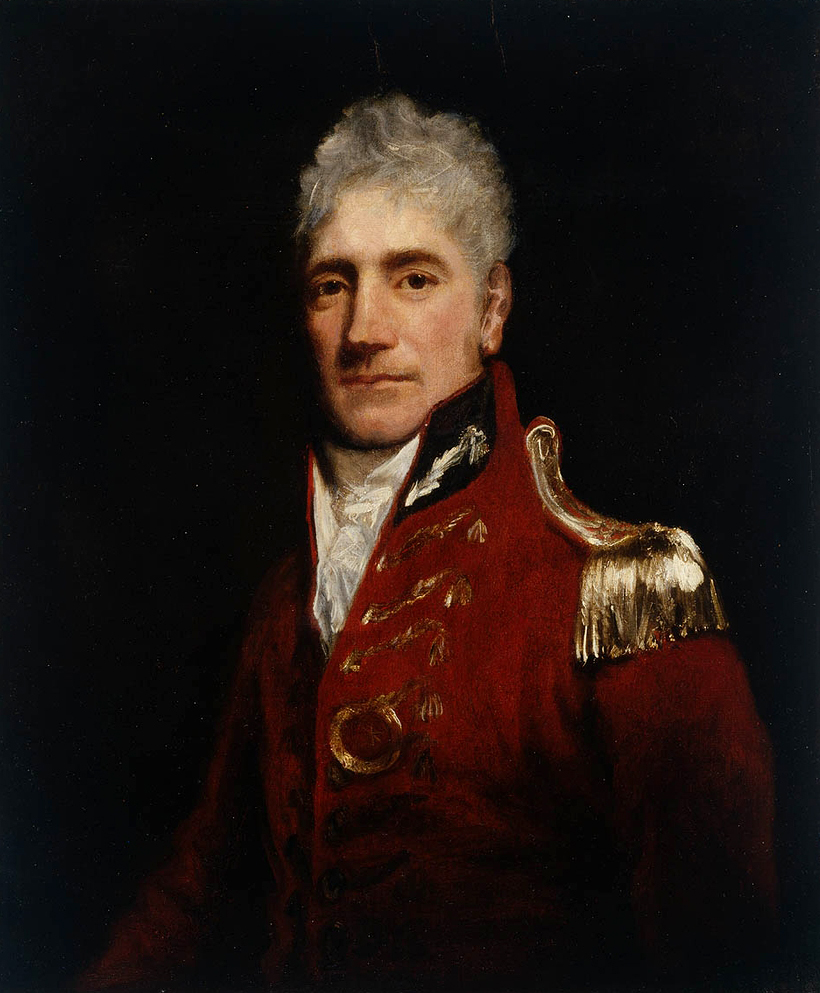
- Portrait, c. 1805–1824

5th Governor of New South Wales
- In office 1 January 1810 – 30 November 1821
- Monarchs: George III; George IV
- Preceded by: William Bligh
- Succeeded by: Thomas Brisbane

Personal details
- Born: 31 January 1762 Ulva, Inner Hebrides, Scotland
- Died: 1 July 1824 (aged 62) London, England
- Spouse(s): Jane Jarvis (m. 1792–1796); Elizabeth Campbell (m. 1807)

Military service
- Branch/service: British Army
- Rank: Major-General
- Commands: 73rd (Perthshire) Regiment of Foot
- Battles/wars: American Revolutionary War; Napoleonic Wars; Australian Frontier Wars
- Awards: Companion of the Order of the Bath

Major-General Lachlan Macquarie (/məˈkwɒrɪ/; Scottish Gaelic: Lachlann MacGuaire; 31 January 1762 – 1 July 1824) was a British Army officer and colonial administrator from Scotland. Macquarie served as the fifth Governor of New South Wales from 1810 to 1821, and had a leading role in the social, economic, and architectural development of the colony. He is considered by historians to have had a crucial influence on the transition of New South Wales from a penal colony to a free settlement and therefore to have played a major role in the shaping of Australian society in the early nineteenth century.

Macquarie orchestrated urban planning in the colony. He had a significant impact on the development of modern Sydney, establishing the layout upon which the modern city centre is based, establishing Hyde Park as Australia's first public park, overseeing the construction of various public buildings along Macquarie Street, and devising the layouts of a number of settlements which today are part of Western Sydney. He also ordered the designing of a street layout for Hobart. A supporter of exploration, Macquarie authorised the 1813 expedition across the Blue Mountains, the first successful British traversal of the region. He ordered the establishment of Bathurst, the first inland British settlement in Australia.

While seeking to promote morality and orderliness, Macquarie favoured the liberal treatment of ex-convicts, known as emancipists, appointing them to prominent government positions and providing generous land grants.

Macquarie expressed a desire for Aboriginal peoples to be treated kindly, and established the first school for Aboriginal children; at the same time, he gave orders that led to the Appin Massacre of Gundungurra and Dharawal people during the Hawkesbury and Nepean Wars.

== Early life ==
Lachlan Macquarie was born on the island of Ulva off the coast of the Isle of Mull in the Inner Hebrides, a chain of islands off the West Coast of Scotland. His father, Lachlan senior, worked as a carpenter and miller, and was a cousin of a Clan MacQuarrie chieftain. His mother, Margaret, was the sister of the influential Murdoch Maclaine, 19th laird of Lochbuie. Despite this, his parents were relatively poor and probably illiterate, leasing and working a small farm as sub-tenants at Oskamull. In his early teens, Macquarie was sent to Edinburgh to be educated, possibly attending the Royal High School of Edinburgh where he learnt English and arithmetic.

== British Army ==
=== North America ===
Macquarie volunteered to join the British Army in 1776 and was assigned to the 84th Regiment of Foot. Later that year he travelled with it to North America to fight against the revolutionaries in the American War of Independence. On the way to America he participated in the Battle of the Newcastle Jane, the first naval victory for a British merchant ship over an American privateer. Macquarie was initially stationed at Halifax, Nova Scotia and obtained the junior rank of ensign on 9 April 1777. On 18 January 1781, he was promoted to lieutenant and transferred to the 71st (Highland) Regiment of Foot, and served with them in New York City and Charleston. Macquarie safely saw out the end of the rebellion by being posted in Jamaica at the time of the British defeat in the war.

=== India ===
In June 1784 Macquarie returned to Scotland, where he managed the Lochbuie estates of his uncle, Captain Murdoch Maclaine. Through the influence of Maclaine, he was offered a lieutenancy in the 77th (Hindoostan) Regiment of Foot, a British Army unit, which he took up on Christmas Day 1787. The cost of this regiment was met by the East India company because it was raised specifically for service in India.

Macquarie arrived with his regiment at Bombay in August 1788 where he was stationed for two years. He saw active service from 1790 to 1792 during the Third Anglo-Mysore War, under General Abercromby, participating in the Capture of Cannanore and the 1792 Siege of Seringapatam. He was promoted to Major of Brigade of troops on the Malabar Coast in August 1793 and became a Freemason that same year at Bombay. In September 1793 Macquarie married Jane Jarvis, daughter of the late Chief Justice of Antigua, Thomas Jarvis, who had owned slave plantations there. According to their marriage settlement, Miss Jarvis was worth £6,000 which was paid out to Macquarie three years later when she died of tuberculosis. In 1795, he saw further action leading troops at the successful siege of the Dutch fort at Cochin. A year later Macquarie participated in the taking of Colombo and other Dutch possessions in Ceylon, and was made commander of the occupying garrison at Galle.

In May 1797, Macquarie led troops during the campaign against the rebel forces of Pazhassi Raja in the jungles around Manantheri. Employing guerilla tactics, Pazhassi inflicted sizable casualties on the 77th, killing a number of officers with Macquarie himself being wounded in the foot. The British torched all the villages in the district but conceded defeat with the East India Company forced into a peace treaty with Pazhassi. Macquarie resigned from his commanding role soon after the campaign.

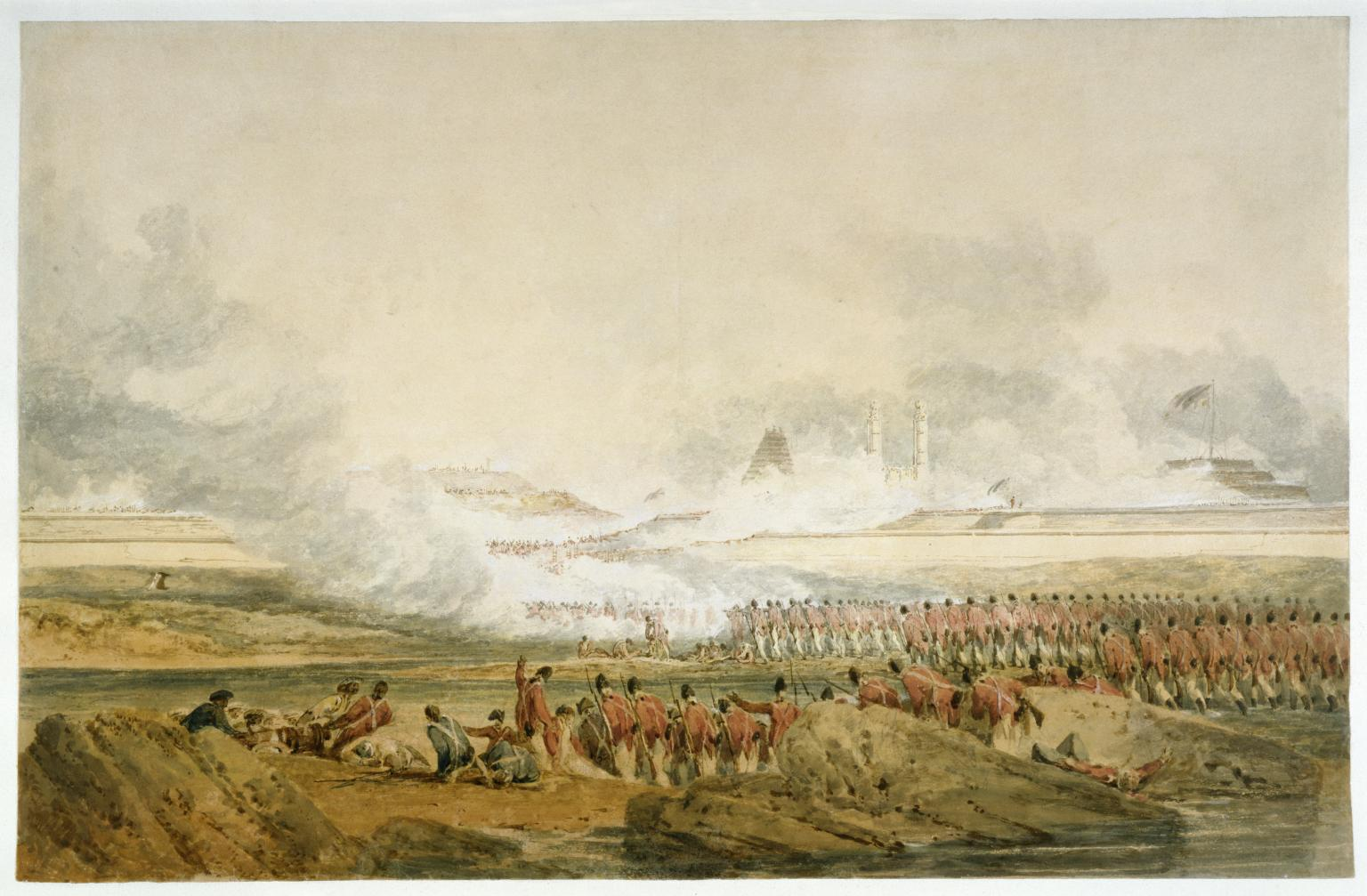
The Siege of Srirangapatna, 1799

He participated in front-line combat during the Fourth Anglo-Mysore War against the forces of Tipu Sultan, helping defeat them first at the Battle of Seedaseer and then at the siege and storming of Tipu's palace at Srirangapatna in 1799. He described the "glorious" aftermath where the bodies of Tipu and his people "lay in such immense Heaps on the Ramparts...as well as in different Parts of the Town that no regular account of them could be taken". Macquarie received £1,300 in prize money after the city was looted.

In 1800, Macquarie was part of the British entourage headed by Governor Duncan that forced Mir Nasiruddin Khan of Surat to sign a treaty with the East India Company dictating the handover of that province to Company rule.

=== Egypt ===
In 1801, Macquarie was appointed by General David Baird as Deputy Adjutant-General of the large British-Indian expeditionary force assigned to link up with Sir Ralph Abercromby's army to expel the French Army from Egypt. Macquarie sailed with his regiment to Egypt from India with the French already in retreat toward Alexandria. He arrived there two days after the capitulation of Alexandria to the British. Macquarie remained in Egypt for about a year during which time he met up with his brother. Macquarie contracted syphilis while in Egypt.

=== Return to Britain, further duty in India ===
In 1803, Macquarie returned to Britain having amassed a fortune of £20,000 (equivalent to £1,777,606 in 2025). His elevation to the social elite saw him meet several times with Jacob Bosanquet and the directors of the East India Company and he also had a personal introduction to King George III. He served in London as Assistant Adjutant General to Lord Harrington and was able to purchase an estate on his native Isle of Mull, which he named Jarvisfield. In 1805, Macquarie was ordered to return to India to take charge of the 86th Regiment of Foot and after arriving also became military secretary to Governor Duncan at Bombay.

In 1807 he travelled overland from India to Britain via Persia and Russia, and was very impressed by the layout and architecture of St Petersburg. Later that year, Macquarie married his third cousin Elizabeth Henrietta Campbell in Devon and took command of the 73rd Regiment in Scotland as a Lieutenant-Colonel. Macquarie's wife gave birth to a daughter in 1808 which died in infancy.

== Governor of New South Wales ==
=== Arrival in Sydney ===
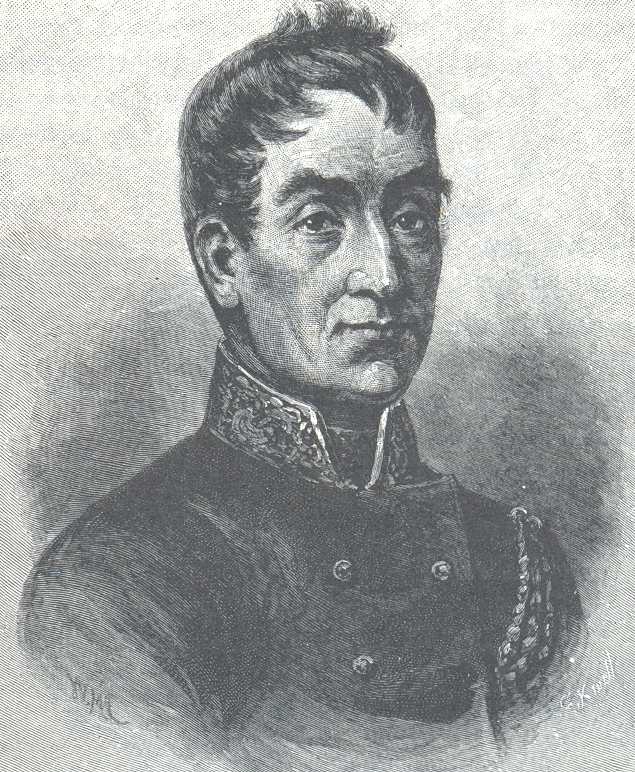
An illustration of Lachlan Macquarie

On 8 May 1809 Macquarie was appointed to the position of Governor of New South Wales and its dependencies. He left for the colony on 22 May 1809, on HMS Dromedary, accompanied by HMS Hindostan. The 73rd Regiment of Foot came with him on the two ships. He arrived on 28 December at Sydney Cove and landed officially on 31 December, taking up his duties on the following day. In making this appointment, the British government changed its practice of appointing naval officers as governor and chose an army commander in the hope that he could secure the co-operation of the corrupt and insubordinate New South Wales Corps. Aided by the fact he arrived in New South Wales at the head of his own unit of regular troops, Macquarie was unchallenged by the New South Wales Corps, whose officers led by John Macarthur had mutinied against and imprisoned the previous governor, William Bligh. Macquarie was promoted to colonel in 1810, appointed brigadier-general in 1811, and promoted again to major-general in 1813, all while serving as governor.

When he arrived in Sydney in 1809 he was accompanied by his Indian "slave-boy" named George Jarvis, whom he had purchased in 1795 for 160 rupees at age 6 (along with a 7-year-old named Hector). Jarvis was named after his deceased wife's brother while Hector later escaped. He wrote about them in his diaries: "very fine, well-looking healthy Black Boys".

=== Dealings with the NSW Corps ===
Macquarie's first task was to restore orderly, lawful government and discipline in the colony following the Rum Rebellion of 1808 against Governor William Bligh. Macquarie was ordered by the British government to arrest two of the leaders of the Rum Rebellion, John Macarthur and Major George Johnston. However, by the time that Macquarie arrived in Sydney, both Macarthur and Johnston had already sailed for England to defend themselves. Macquarie immediately set about cancelling the various initiatives taken by the rebel government—for example, all "pardons, leases and land grants" made by the rebels were revoked. However, after an avalanche of petitions from leaseholders were sent to Macquarie, he soon back-flipped and ratified them all.

Although the New South Wales Corps and its monopoly were soon ended, the military influence survived, with officers having sway over the justice system. Macquarie himself chose to keep the peace with the remaining NSW Corps officers and maintained an ambivalent attitude to the rebellion against Bligh.

=== Civil reforms ===
Part of Macquarie's undertaking of bringing order to the colony was to refashion the convict settlement into an urban environment of organised towns with streets and parks. The street layout of modern central Sydney is based upon a plan established by Macquarie. The colony's most prestigious buildings were built on Macquarie Street which he named after himself. Some of these still stand today including the 'Rum Hospital' part of which now serves as the Parliament House of New South Wales. The elaborate stables which Macquarie commissioned for Government House are now part of the modern structure housing the Sydney Conservatorium of Music.

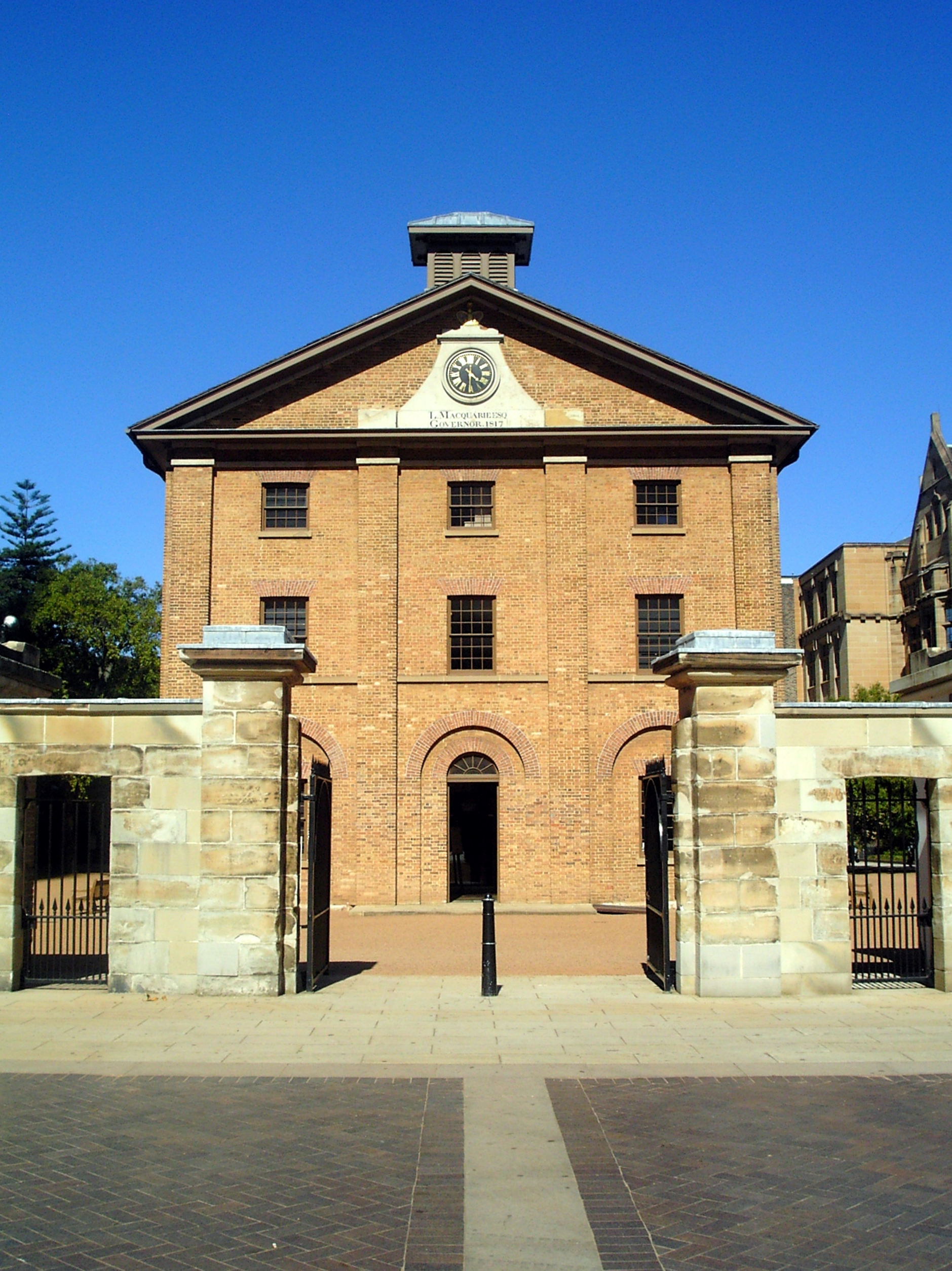
Hyde Park Barracks

Other notable edifices built during Macquarie's tenure include the Parramatta Female Orphan School, St James Church, and the Hyde Park Barracks. He also officially named and established Hyde Park as a public recreation area. These buildings were constructed by Macquarie in defiance of the British government's ban on expensive public building projects in the colony and reflect the tension between Macquarie's vision of Sydney as a Georgian city and that of powerful British colonists who saw it as not much more than a camp for cheap convict labour. Macquarie also dedicated a vast expanse of land as the Sydney Common that is collectively today's Centennial Parklands group of parks, the Sydney Cricket Ground, Sydney Football Stadium and Victoria Barracks.

In late 1810, Macquarie toured the regions around Sydney naming and marking out the sites and street plans of future towns such as Liverpool, Windsor and Richmond. On a visit of inspection to the settlement of Hobart Town on the Derwent River in Van Diemen's Land (now Tasmania) in November 1811, Macquarie was appalled at the ramshackle arrangement of the town and ordered the government surveyor James Meehan to survey a regular street layout. This survey determined the form of the current centre of the city of Hobart. Another town-planning reform initiated by Macquarie was made when he ordered all traffic on New South Wales roads to keep to the left.

Macquarie is credited with producing the first official currency specifically for circulation in Australia. In 1812 he purchased 40,000 Spanish dollar coins and had a convicted forger named William Henshall cut the centres out of the coins and counter stamp them to distinguish them as belonging to the colony of New South Wales. The central plug (known as a "dump") was valued at 15 pence and the rim (known as a holey dollar) became a five-shilling piece. Any forging of the new currency was proclaimed as being punishable by seven years in the Newcastle coal mines. Macquarie also encouraged the creation of the colony's first bank, the Bank of New South Wales, in 1817.

=== Social reforms ===
Macquarie was given specific instructions to encourage morality and orderliness in the colony. He promoted marriage and church attendance, increased police patrols and made laws against public alcohol consumption. Central to this policy were the emancipists: convicts whose sentences had expired or who had been given conditional or absolute pardons. Macquarie wanted the ex-convicts to live reformed, law-abiding Christian lives. Initially he favoured Anglicanism only but in 1820 cautiously welcomed officially-approved Catholic priests.

Some of these emancipated convicts were either skilled professionals or had become very wealthy by operating commercial enterprises in the colony. Macquarie viewed these types of ex-convicts as ideal models of social transformation, and rewarded them by elevating their social standing and appointing them to important government positions. For example, Francis Greenway became colonial architect, Dr William Redfern became the colonial surgeon, while Andrew Thompson and Simeon Lord were appointed as magistrates.

The gentry in the colony, known as the "exclusives" were outraged at these appointments with some refusing to work alongside the promoted ex-convicts. However, an 1812 inquiry into the convict system in Australia by a Select committee on Transportation, supported Macquarie's liberal policies. The committee concluded that the colony should be made as prosperous as possible so as to provide work for the convicts and to encourage them to become settlers after being given their freedom.

Macquarie also looked favourably on issuing land grants to emancipists, and in 1811 when wishing to expand British settlement to the south-west, he issued a large amount of 30 and 40 acre grants in the Appin region to ex-convicts. Later, in 1818, when expanding the colonisation in the Bathurst district, Macquarie personally selected ten settlers, many of whom were emancipists.

Obstacles to these social reforms included a severe drought in 1814, causing widespread loss of crops and livestock. Many farmers were close to insolvency with the ensuing depression. Also, the end of the Napoleonic Wars in 1815 brought a renewed flood of both convicts and settlers to New South Wales, doubling the white population. Macquarie utilised his civic building programme to encourage employment and economic activity.

=== Judicial reforms ===
Macquarie's efforts to allow emancipists to take up official positions also extended to the judicial system where, due to a lack of solicitors, convicted former lawyers such as Edward Eagar were allowed to take on civil cases. In 1814, with the establishment of the Supreme Court of New South Wales and the arrival its first judge, Jeffery Hart Bent, Macquarie's relationship with the courts became fractious. Bent, a staunch conservative, brought solicitors Frederick Garling and William Moore with him and refused to hear cases brought by ex-convict lawyers. The subsequent personal antipathy between him and Macquarie resulted in making the court unworkable. Bent complained to the British Government that Macquarie was blameworthy of authoritarian excesses, while Macquarie complained that Bent was insubordinate. As a result, Earl Bathurst, the Secretary of State for the Colonies, in an effort to keep society in the colony functioning, recalled Bent to England and censured Macquarie. This situation contributed to Commissioner John Thomas Bigge being sent in 1819 to enquire into the affairs of New South Wales.

=== Promotion of exploration ===
Lachlan Macquarie was a great sponsor of British exploration in the colony. He himself participated in a number of expeditions around the Sydney Basin and to other regions including Jervis Bay, Port Stephens, the Hunter River, Bathurst and Van Diemen's Land. He invariably named the landmarks and new settlements he came across after himself, his wife or members of the British aristocracy.

In 1813 he authorised Gregory Blaxland, William Wentworth and William Lawson to conduct their successful crossing of the Blue Mountains and become the first non-Indigenous people to view the great plains of the interior. Later that same year George Evans, directed by Macquarie to further explore this inland region, came upon and named the Macquarie River. In 1815, Macquarie ordered the establishment of Bathurst on this river, which became Australia's first inland British settlement. Evans conducted further exploration to the south-west in 1815 at the behest of the Governor and named the Lachlan River after him.

Macquarie appointed John Oxley as surveyor-general and sent him on expeditions in 1817–18 to further explore the Lachlan River, Liverpool Plains and the north coast of New South Wales and to find suitable lands for colonisation. Oxley, following the tradition of labelling the geographic features after the Governor, named a promising coastal inlet Port Macquarie.

=== Policies toward Aboriginals ===
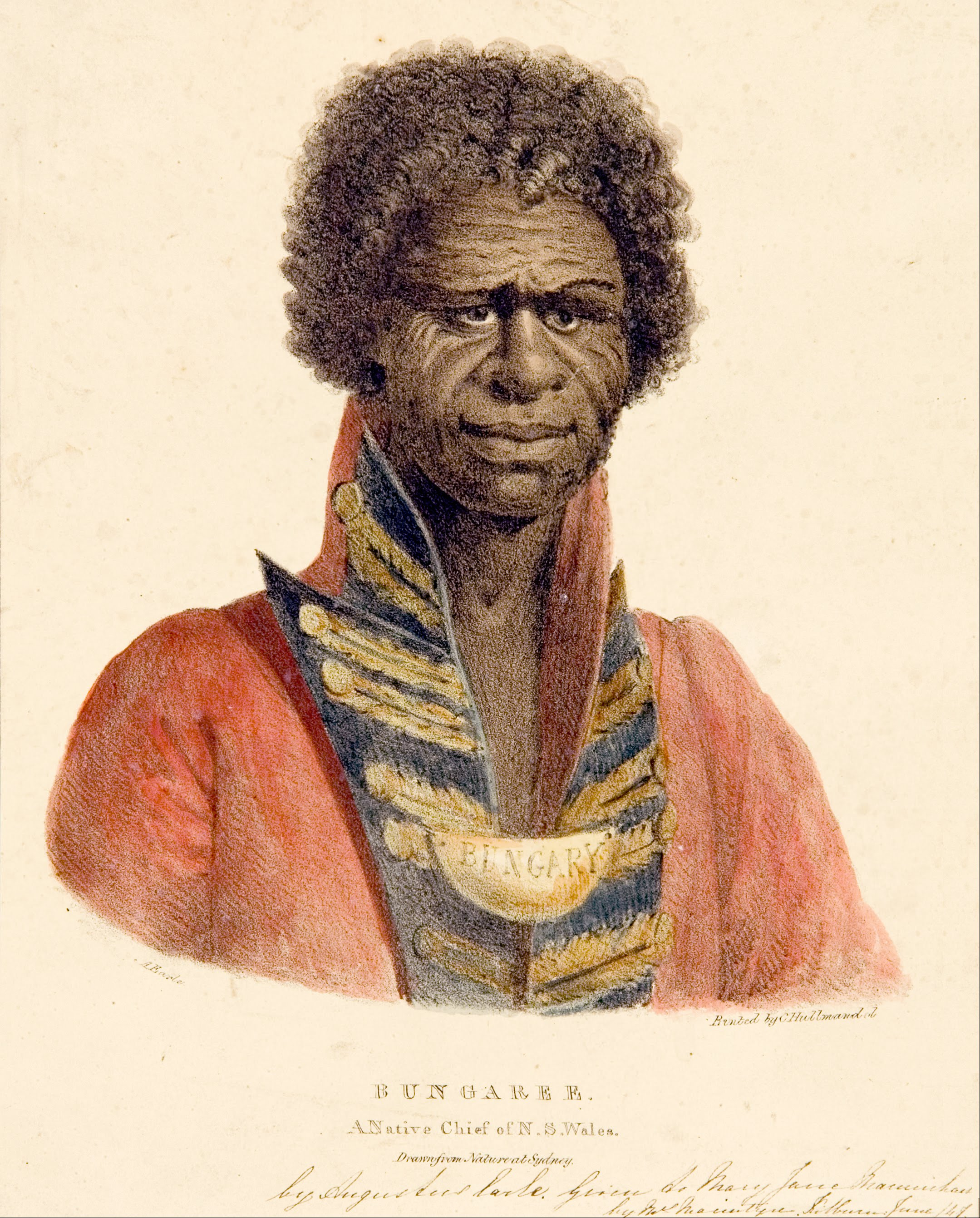
Bungaree depicted with the gorget given to him by Macquarie

Macquarie's policy toward Aboriginal Australians consisted of co-operation and assimilation, backed by military coercion. On arrival in the colony in 1810 Macquarie gave a speech expressing the wish that "Natives of this Country...may be always treated with kindness and attention", and for the next four years very little conflict occurred. However, in the winter of 1814 a number of settlers and Aboriginal people were killed in conflict in the Nepean River region. Macquarie initially made proclamations to promote peace but also later sent an armed expedition to patrol the area.

Aiming to advance better relations, Macquarie organised a conference at Parramatta on 28 December 1814 for all Aboriginal people in the region, and in January 1815 he opened the Parramatta Native Institution for the education of Aboriginal children. Around forty Aboriginal children, some of whom were 'decoyed away' from their parents and others taken during frontier conflict, became students and were taught in the British tradition by William and Elizabeth Shelley. The children seem to have been mostly well-treated and in 1819, Maria Lock topped the colony-wide examinations. However, the institution was also a conscious attempt to reduce the influence and future of Indigenous culture and may have contributed to further disillusion and hostility.

Macquarie also developed a strategy of rewarding Aboriginals who assisted the British by declaring them 'chiefs of their tribe' and presenting them with a brass breast-plate (known as a gorget) engraved with their name and title even though it often did not reflect their actual clan status. Macquarie also rewarded these 'chiefs' with small parcels of land set aside for the use of their families. The first receiver of these rewards was Bungaree who in 1815 was issued a gorget, a boat and 15 acres at Georges Head. In 1816, gorgets and land parcels were given to Colebee and Nurragingy by Macquarie for their role in assisting the military operations against hostile Aboriginals along the Nepean River. The practice of colonists giving gorgets to 'loyal' Aboriginals continued for many decades throughout Australia.

In March 1816, considerable Aboriginal resistance was encountered especially at Silverdale where a large group of Aborigines killed four settlers with a combination of spears and stolen muskets. Macquarie ordered the mobilisation of three detachments of the military in order to go:

into the Interior and remote parts of the Colony, for the purpose of Punishing the Hostile Natives, by clearing the Country of them entirely, and driving them across the mountains; as well as if possible to apprehend the Natives who have committed the late murders and outrages, with the view of their being made dreadful and severe examples of, if taken alive. – I have directed as many Natives as possible to be made Prisoners, with the view of keeping them as Hostages until the real guilty ones have surrendered themselves, or have been given up by their Tribes to summary Justice. – In the event of the Natives making the smallest show of resistance – or refusing to surrender when called upon so to do – the officers Commanding the Military Parties have been authorized to fire on them to compel them to surrender; hanging up on Trees the Bodies of such Natives as may be killed on such occasions, in order to strike the greater terror into the Survivors.

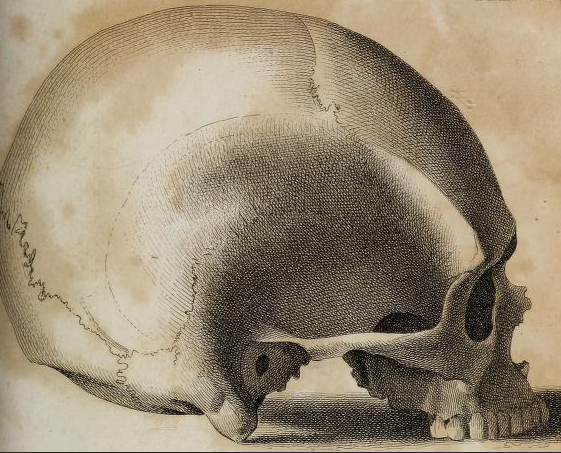
Drawing of the skull of Cannabaygal, killed at Appin

On 17 April, the detachment of 33 grenadiers led by Captain James Wallis managed to corner a large group of Gandangara and Tharawal people near the Cataract River gorge in the upper Nepean catchment. At least 14 men, women and children were killed, some shot while others fell off the cliffs. This became known as the Appin Massacre. The corpses of two men, Cannabaygal and Dunnell, were strung up on trees as per Macquarie's instructions, the skull of Cannabaygal later being taken to Scotland. Two surviving women and three children were taken prisoner and Macquarie rewarded Wallis for his efforts by appointing him Commandant of the Newcastle convict settlement.

Hostilities continued for most of the rest of 1816 with Macquarie proclaiming no Aborigines were allowed into the settled areas without a passport and issuing search and destroy orders for a further ten Aboriginal men. By early 1817, these actions by Macquarie forced an end to Aboriginal resistance in what is now known as the Hawkesbury and Nepean Wars.

=== Bigge inquiry ===
Macquarie's policies, especially his championing of the emancipated convicts and the lavish expenditure of government money on public works, aroused opposition both in the colony and in London, where the government still saw New South Wales as fundamentally a penal colony, a place to be dreaded by the convicts. Therefore, in 1819 Earl Bathurst appointed an English judge, John Bigge, to visit New South Wales and report on its administration.

Bigge consulted with the 'exclusive' colonists such as John Macarthur, Samuel Marsden and Archibald Bell who were strongly against the social reforms of Macquarie. They wanted the convicts to be removed from the government building works in the towns and instead labouring on their large sheep-grazing land acquisitions. Bigge concurred with these opinions and saw that government expediture could be significantly decreased and the British wool industry strengthened if large numbers of convicts were assigned to these 'men of capital' as cheap labour.

Bigge's reports subsequently depicted Macquarie as having an error of conduct in making New South Wales a place for the convicts to reform back into society rather than a place of punishment, and stated that his policies of remediation toward the emancipated were not only 'inexpedient and dangerous' but were 'an act of violence' to the established colonists.

Macquarie offered his resignation several times, which was accepted in 1820 with Thomas Brisbane replacing him as governor in 1821. Macquarie served longer than any other governor but not long after, in 1824, the overall power within the role was reduced by the introduction of the New South Wales Legislative Council, Australia's first legislative body, appointed to advise the governor.

== Return to Scotland, death and legacy ==
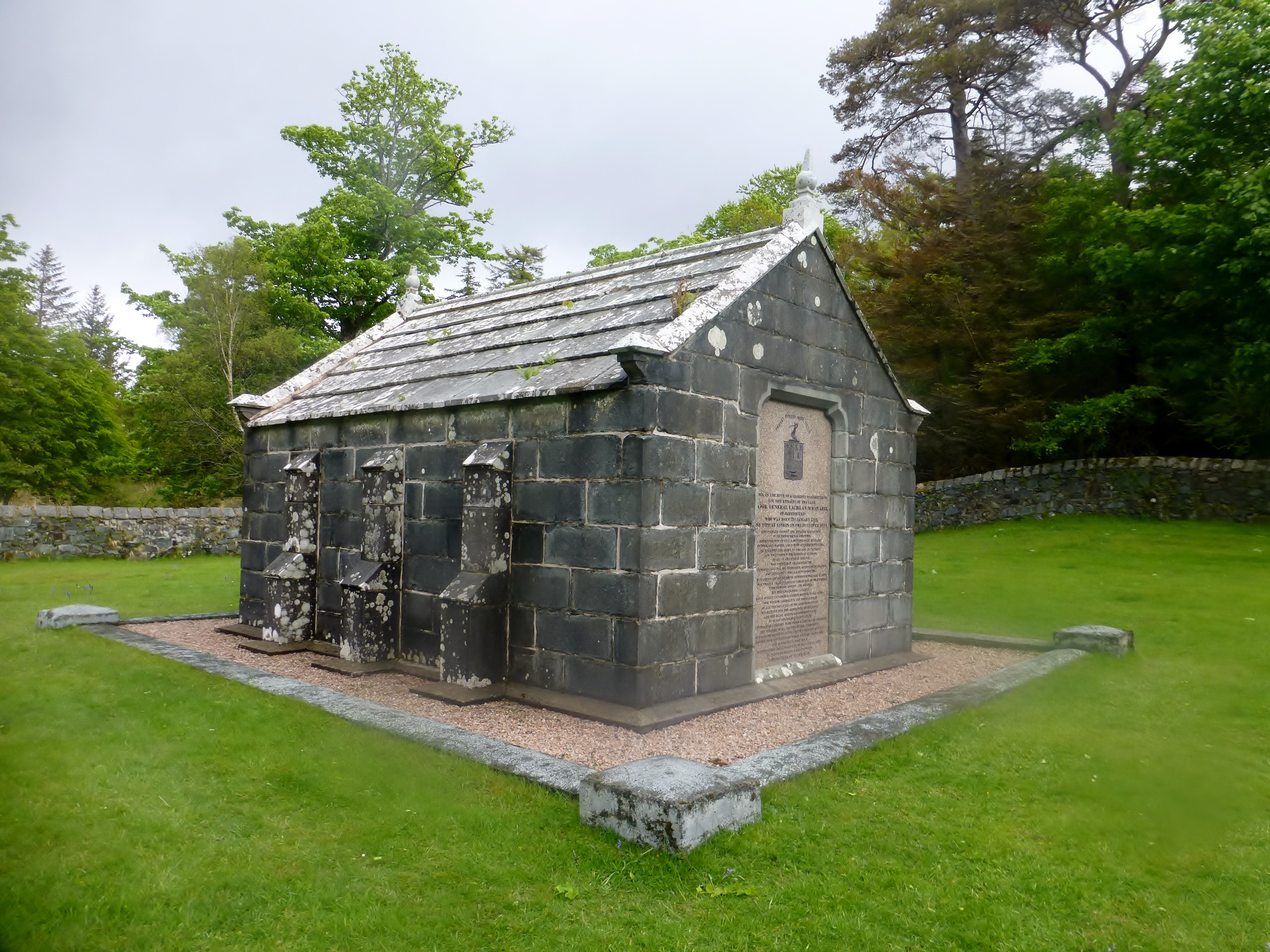
Macquarie Mausoleum on the Isle of Mull in western Scotland

Macquarie returned to Scotland, and died in London in 1824 while busy defending himself against Bigge's charges. However, his reputation continued to grow after his death, especially among the emancipists and their descendants, who were the majority of the Australian population until the Australian gold rushes. Today he is regarded by many as the most enlightened and progressive of the early governors who sought to establish Australia as a country rather than a prison camp.

The nationalist school of Australian historians have treated him as a proto-nationalist hero. Macquarie formally adopted the name Australia for the continent, the name earlier proposed by the first circumnavigator of Australia, Matthew Flinders. The origin of the name "Australia" is closely associated with Macquarie who first used it in an official despatch in 1817. As well as the many geographical features named after him, many institutions in Australia such as Macquarie University in Sydney are also named in his honour.

Macquarie was buried on the Isle of Mull in a mausoleum near Salen with his wife, daughter and son. The grave is maintained by the National Trust of Australia and is inscribed "The Father of Australia".

== Memorials ==
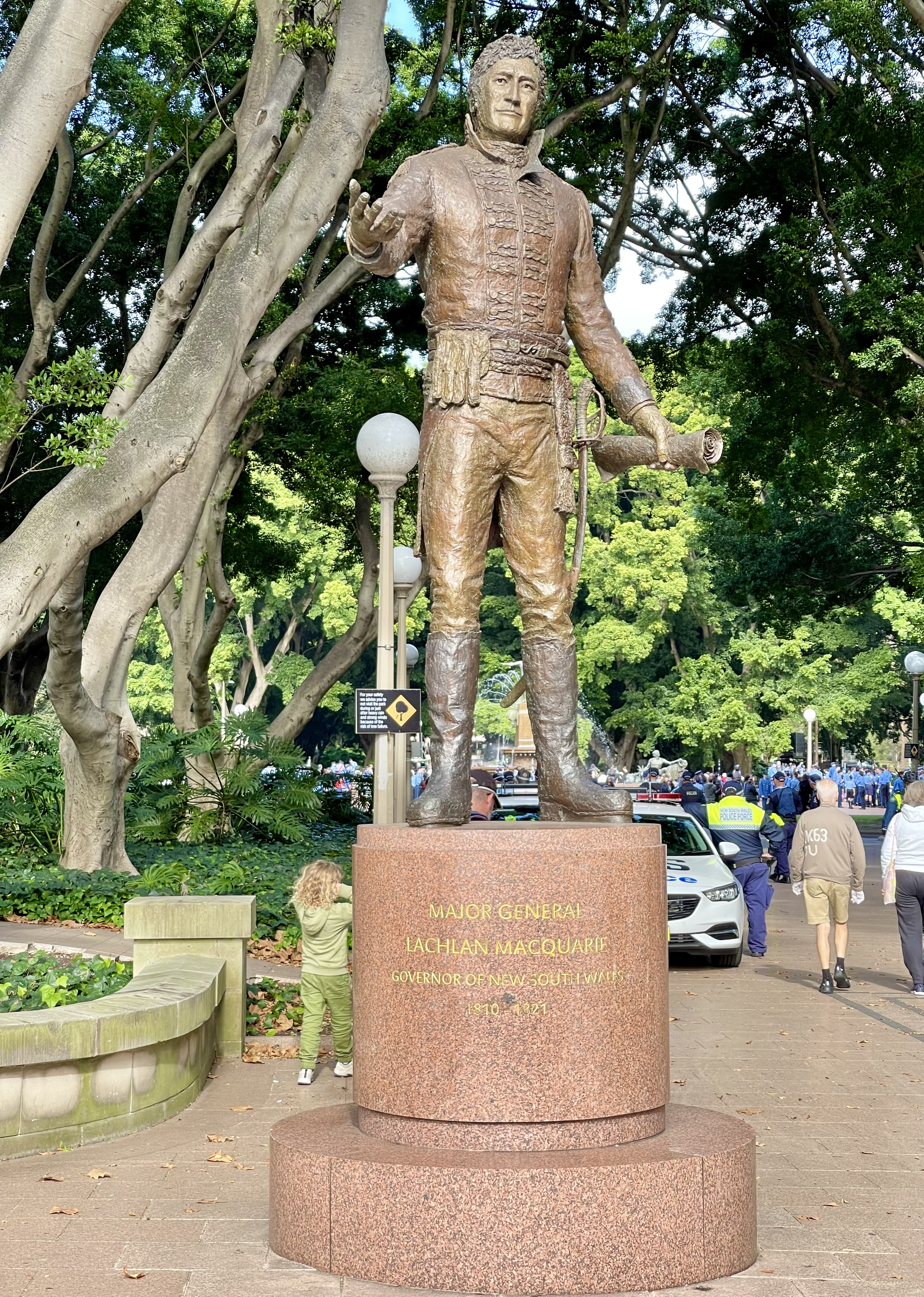
Lachlan Macquarie monument at Hyde Park, Sydney

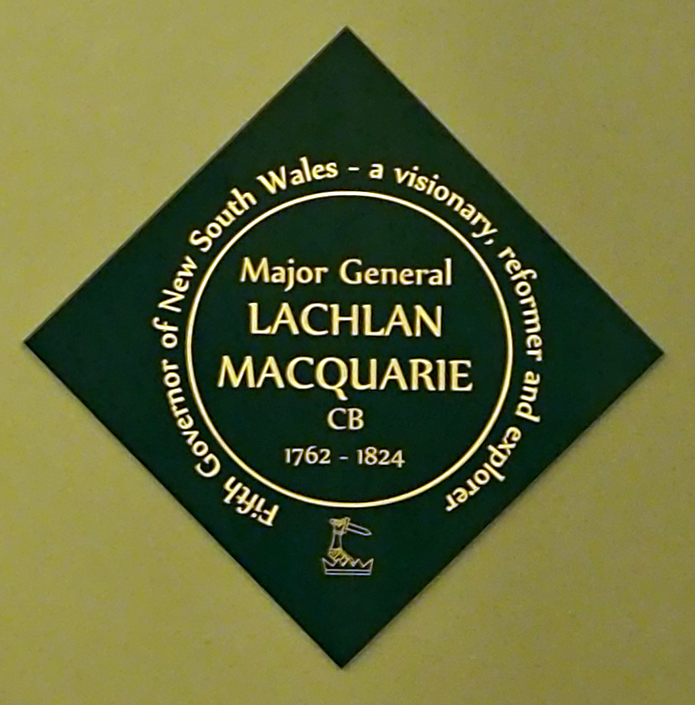
Memorial plaque to Governor Macquarie in St James' Church, Sydney

A statue of Macquarie commissioned by the NSW Government and created by Terrance Plowright in 2012, stands at the north entrance to Hyde Park in the centre of Sydney. A nearby inscription reads: "He was a perfect gentleman, a Christian and supreme legislator of the human heart." The appropriateness of the statue and the inscription have been questioned in view of his punitive expeditions against Indigenous people. On Anzac Day in April 2023, protesters vandalised the statue with graffiti alleging Macquarie had been involved in genocide; the protest drew criticism from some in the local community.

== Naming and recognition ==
Many places, buildings and institutions in Australia have been named in Macquarie's honour (some of these were named by Macquarie himself). They include:

=== At the time of his governorship or shortly thereafter ===
- Macquarie Island, between Tasmania and Antarctica. The subsequent tectonic plate Macquarie Ridge and junction which align northwards from the island are also named after Macquarie.
- Lake Macquarie, on the coast of New South Wales between Sydney and Newcastle was named after Macquarie in 1826.
- Macquarie River, a significant inland river in New South Wales which passes Bathurst, Wellington, Dubbo and Warren before entering the Macquarie Marshes and the Barwon River
- Mount Macquarie, highest point in the Blayney Shire at 1100 metres above sea level. For a time it was named Mount Lachlan
- Lachlan River, another significant river in New South Wales
- Port Macquarie, a city at the mouth of the Hastings River on the Mid North Coast of New South Wales
- Macquarie Pass, a route traversing the escarpment between the Illawarra district and the Southern Highlands district of New South Wales
- Macquarie Rivulet, a river 23 kilometres long which rises near Robertson, New South Wales and drains into Lake Illawarra

==== Around Sydney ====
- Macquarie Street, one of the principal streets of the Sydney central business district, home of the Parliament of New South Wales
- Macquarie Place, a small park in the Sydney CBD
- Macquarie Lighthouse, Australia's first and longest operating navigational light
- The former Fort Macquarie on Bennelong Point
- Macquarie Fields, now a suburb of Sydney but named by surveyor Evans after the governor

==== In Tasmania ====
- Macquarie Street, one of the principal streets of Hobart
- Macquarie Street, one of the principal streets of the historic town of Evandale, a town he founded in 1811
- Macquarie Harbour, on the west coast
- Macquarie River, a major perennial river in the Midlands region

==== In New South Wales ====
- Macquarie Pier, named after Governor Macquarie in 1818 by James Wallis, this is the breakwater at the mouth of the Hunter River for the port of Newcastle, linking Nobbys Head to the mainland at South Head (now Fort Scratchley)
- The Macquarie Arms Hotel at Windsor, New South Wales built in 1815. It ceased operating in 1840, but reopened in 1874 and has been used continuously as a hotel ever since
- Lachlan Macquarie Ward, Parramatta

=== Many years after his governorship ===
- Macquarie Park and Macquarie Links, suburbs of Sydney
- Macquarie Shopping Centre, North Ryde
- Macquarie, a suburb of Canberra, Australia
- Lachlan Street, Macquarie, Canberra, Australia
- Division of Macquarie, one of the first 65 Divisions of the Australian House of Representatives created for the Australian Parliament in 1901

=== Institutions named after Macquarie ===
- Macquarie Hospital, Sydney
- Macquarie University, Sydney
- Macquarie Group, an investment bank created in 1985 using one of Governor Macquarie's "holey dollars" as its symbol
- Macquarie Community College, an adult community education provider in northwest and western Sydney
- Macquarie Grammar School, Sydney
- Macquarie Correctional Centre, a male maximum security facility operated by Corrective Services New South Wales which is located in Wellington, New South Wales

=== Awards named after Macquarie ===
- Lachlan Macquarie Award for Heritage, a national architecture award for heritage and conservation presented by the Australian Institute of Architects since 1983

== Popular culture ==
Macquarie appears as a character in the following:

- the film Heritage (1935)
- the mini series The Outcasts played by Henry Gilbert.

== Coat of arms ==
Coat of arms of Lachlan Macquarie
Notes During the process of Macquarie University acquiring their own arms, it was discovered that the arms used by Governor Macquarie had never been formally granted by the Court of the Lord Lyon in Scotland, and the university successfully applied to have the arms matriculated retrospectively for Macquarie. These arms, along with the new arms of the university, were formally unveiled on 31 May 1967 by the chancellor, Sir Garfield Barwick. Adopted Matriculated retrospectively in Lyon Register by Macquarie University, 6 February 1967 Crest On a Wreath of his Liveries (Argent and Vert), issuing from a Tower head embattled and crenellated Argent, a dexter Arm in armour embowed, the hand grasping a Dagger projected fessways, all proper. Helm A closed Helmet. Escutcheon Quarterly embattled, 1 & 4, Vert, in chief three Towers proper masoned Sable; 2, Gules, three Cross-crosslets fitchy Argent; 3, per fess Azure and Vert, a Lymphad sails furled in chief, and a Fish naiant in base, both Argent. Motto Latin: Turris Fortis Meus Mihi Deus ("God is a strong tower to me") Other elements Mantling Vert, doubled Argent.

== See also ==
- Historical Records of Australia

Government offices
Preceded by William Bligh	Governor of New South Wales; 1810–1821	Succeeded by Thomas Brisbane
