= James Wallis (British Army officer) =

Officer in the 46th Regiment of Foot of the British Army in the 19c

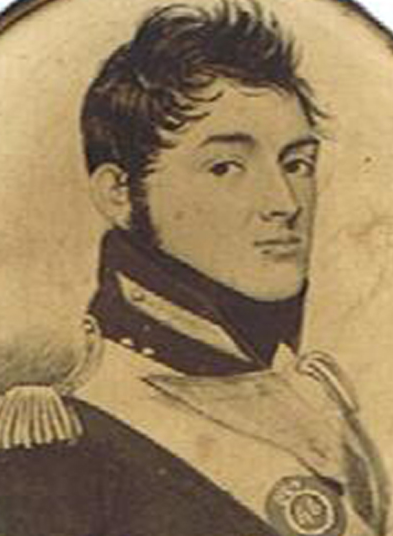
Major James Wallis

Major James Wallis (11 October 1785 – 12 July 1858) was an Anglo-Irish military officer who served in the 46th Regiment of Foot. Wallis saw service in Dominica, New South Wales, and India. During his deployment in New South Wales, he commanded a detachment of grenadiers which committed the Appin Massacre of 1816, and was later promoted to the post of Commandant at the convict settlement of Newcastle from 1816 to 1818. Wallis is also noted for producing a number of historically significant sketches and paintings during his colonial military career.

== Early life ==
James Wallis was born into an Anglo-Irish family in County Cork, Ireland, his parents being James Wallis and Lucinda Hewson. In December 1803, he was appointed as an ensign in the 46th Regiment of Foot of the British Army which were garrisoned in Cork at the time.

== West Indies ==
In 1804, the 46th Regiment were deployed to the West Indies and stationed on the island of Dominica where Wallis was promoted to the rank of lieutenant. In 1805, French forces attempted to invade the island but were beaten back by the soldiers of the 46th and other regiments. Wallis received an official commendation for his conduct during the conflict while in charge of the outpost at Cachacrou. A year later, Wallis was given command of a detachment which chased down and captured a French general and eighty enemy soldiers who had attempted to steal a British vessel. Wallis again received praise for his efforts.

In 1809 and 1810, as part of the 46th Regiment, Wallis was involved in the British expeditions that successfully invaded the islands of Martinique and Guadeloupe.

== New South Wales ==
In 1813, the 46th Regiment was ordered to proceed to the British colony of New South Wales, arriving in the port of Sydney in February 1814. By this stage, Wallis had been promoted to the rank of army captain in the section of the 46th which was garrisoned at the George Street barracks.

=== Massacre at Appin ===
From 1815, British colonisation expanded out from the Sydney region at a greater pace. To the south-west, the ongoing Hawkesbury and Nepean Wars between the colonists and the resident Darug and Gandangara people flared. In March 1816, a punitive expedition of British colonists was surprised and ambushed at Silverdale by a group of Aboriginal people armed with muskets and spears. Four colonists were killed; in response, Governor Lachlan Macquarie ordered an armed reprisal "to inflict exemplary and severe punishment on the mountain tribes...to strike them with terror...clearing the country of them entirely." Macquarie sent three detachments of the 46th Regiment into the region with Wallis being placed in command of the detachment of grenadiers.

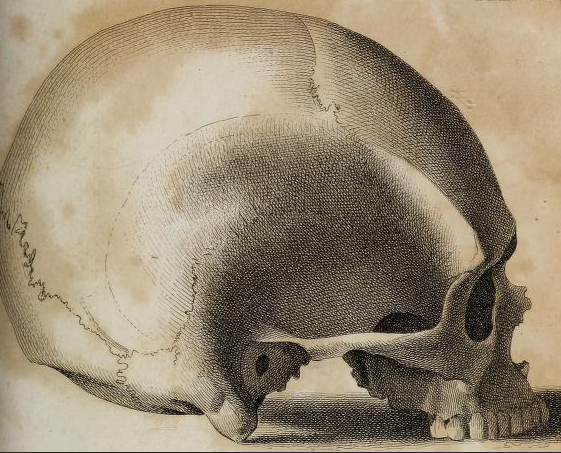
Drawing of the skull of Cannabaygal, killed at Appin

Wallis' group of 37 grenadiers and officers scoured the area around Appin and Minto and were soon informed that a group of Aborigines were camping near the Cataract River. In the early morning of 17 April, Wallis led a surprise attack on this camp with "smart firing" resulting in the deaths of at least fourteen Aboriginal people from both gunshot wounds or from falling off the rocky cliffs around the river while fleeing. Most of the dead were old men, women and children. The wanted men, Cannabaygal and Dunnell were also killed. Wallis took two surviving women and three children prisoner and, following the orders of Governor Macquarie, hung the corpses of Cannabaygal and Dunnell from trees on a hill near Appin to "strike the survivors with greater terror." Cannabaygal's skull was later collected and sent to the University of Edinburgh where it featured in a book on phrenology by Sir George Mackenzie.

Wallis then continued to march his troops through to the Georges River and toward the Illawarra, with prominent colonist John Oxley joining him. Wallis split his group into several sections with one led by Lieutenant A.G. Parker capturing an additional number of Aborigines. In all 16 Aboriginal people were captured during the operation, of which four children were sent to the Parramatta Native School and the rest sent to Sydney Gaol. These people were released after a month except for one man who was transported to Van Diemen's Land.

Wallis and his detachment returned to Sydney on 4 May where Governor Macquarie praised Wallis for acting "perfectly in conformity to the instructions I had furnished them." Wallis was rewarded with fifteen gallons of rum and was appointed as commandant and magistrate of the penal colony at Newcastle.

=== Commandant at Newcastle ===
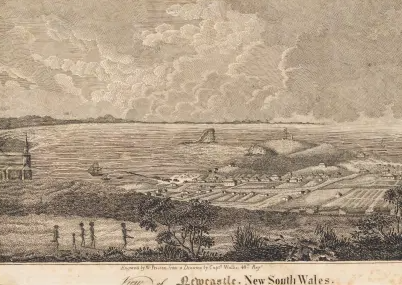
Drawing of Newcastle, New South Wales by James Wallis

Wallis arrived at Newcastle in June 1816 and proceeded to implement civic improvements to change what was a basic coal mining convict camp into a functioning town. Within two years, Wallis had established a school and presided over the construction of several important buildings such as a hospital and Christ Church Cathedral. He also oversaw the building of a barracks and a jail, and started major improvements to the harbour by the construction of a causeway from the headland to Nobbys Island.

With cedar logging operations by colonists extending inland from Newcastle along the Hunter River, areas of land upriver were opened to further colonisation. In 1818, Wallis authorised several experimental farms to be established by well-behaved convicts at a location of open plains. These plains were named Wallis Plains in his honour by Governor Macquarie and this collection of convict farms later evolved into the town of Maitland.

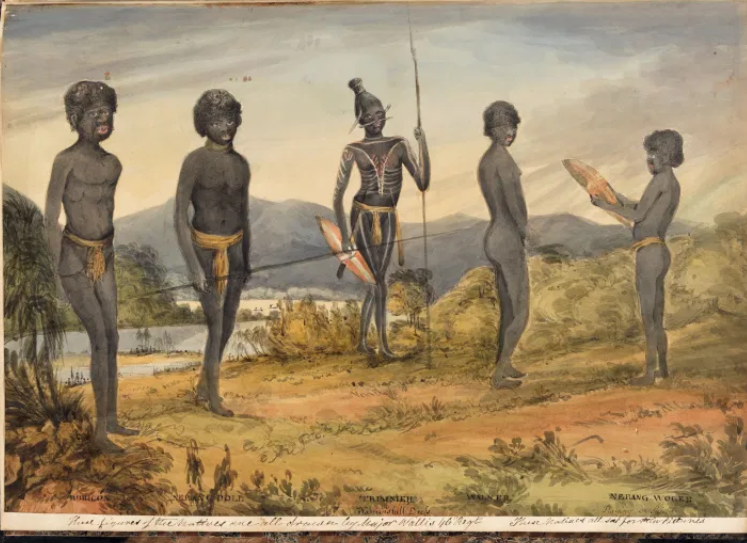
Painting of Aborigines of the Newcastle area by James Wallis

While in command at Newcastle, Wallis came into contact with talented convict artists Joseph Lycett and Richard Browne. In addition to Wallis utilising these artists to design the new buildings being constructed in Newcastle, he also encouraged them to paint representations of the land and the Aboriginal people of the region. Under the patronage of Wallis, Lycett in particular produced a series of historically important paintings of Newcastle during its first years of existence and the Awabakal people. Lycett also seems to have influenced Wallis into acquiring artistic skills, with Wallis starting to produce paintings and sketches from this time. Like Lycett, Wallis completed several significant works depicting the landscape, flora and fauna of the Newcastle area as well as unique portraits of local Aboriginal Australians such as Burigon.

In late 1818, the remaining soldiers of the 46th Regiment were ordered to redeploy to India and Wallis was replaced as commandant and magistrate of Newcastle by Major James Morisset. One of Wallis' last duties at Newcastle was to assist John Oxley complete his explorations of coastal New South Wales by sending a relief vessel to Port Stephens where Oxley's group were unable to proceed due to their position and ongoing skirmishes with local Aborigines. Wallis left New South Wales in charge of a mixed group of British forces on board the Tottenham in February 1819 bound for India.

== India ==
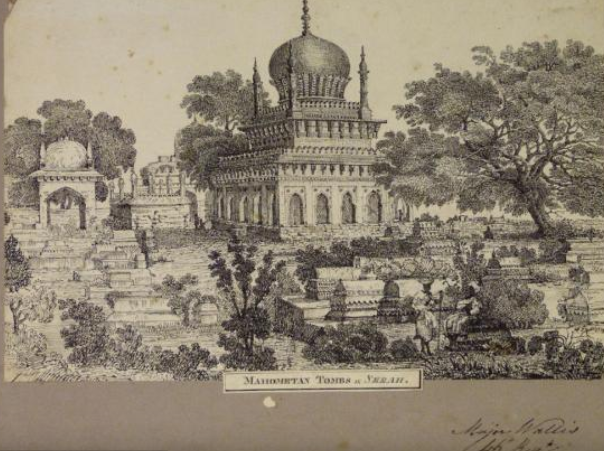
Drawing of Mallik Rehan Tomb, Sira by James Wallis

In India, Wallis was promoted to the rank of Major and was made commanding officer at the headquarters of the 46th Regiment based at Bellary Fort. Under his command, the 46th Regiment were involved in the suppression of the 1824 insurrection against Company rule at Kittur led by the Indian queen Kittur Chennamma. Wallis received official accolades for his abilities in leading the 46th Regiment and retired from military service in 1826. Wallis produced a number of sketches and paintings of the Karnataka region while based at Bellary.

== Later life ==
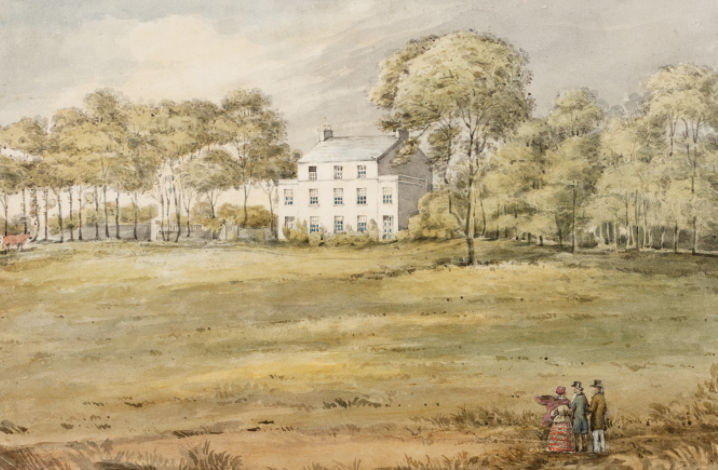
Painting of Lucyville estate in Cork by James Wallis

After retiring from the British Army, Wallis returned to Ireland where he lived with his first wife Anne Mann at the Wallis family estate at Lucyville near Cork. He continued his artistic pursuits, producing a number of paintings of various locations around the British Isles. His wife died in 1835 and Wallis moved to Clifton, near Bristol where he married Mary Ann Breach in 1836. They had twin sons in 1838, one being delivered stillborn. The other twin died three years later. Wallis lived for a time at Douglas, Isle of Man and then moved to Prestbury Green near Cheltenham where he died in 1858.

Wallis Lake and Wallis Creek in New South Wales were named in his honour.
