= Gandangara =

Aboriginal people in New South Wales, Australia

Gandangara people
- aka: Gundungurra, Gundungari, Gundanora, Gurragunga, Burragorang, Mountain tribe, Wollondilly tribe (Tindale)
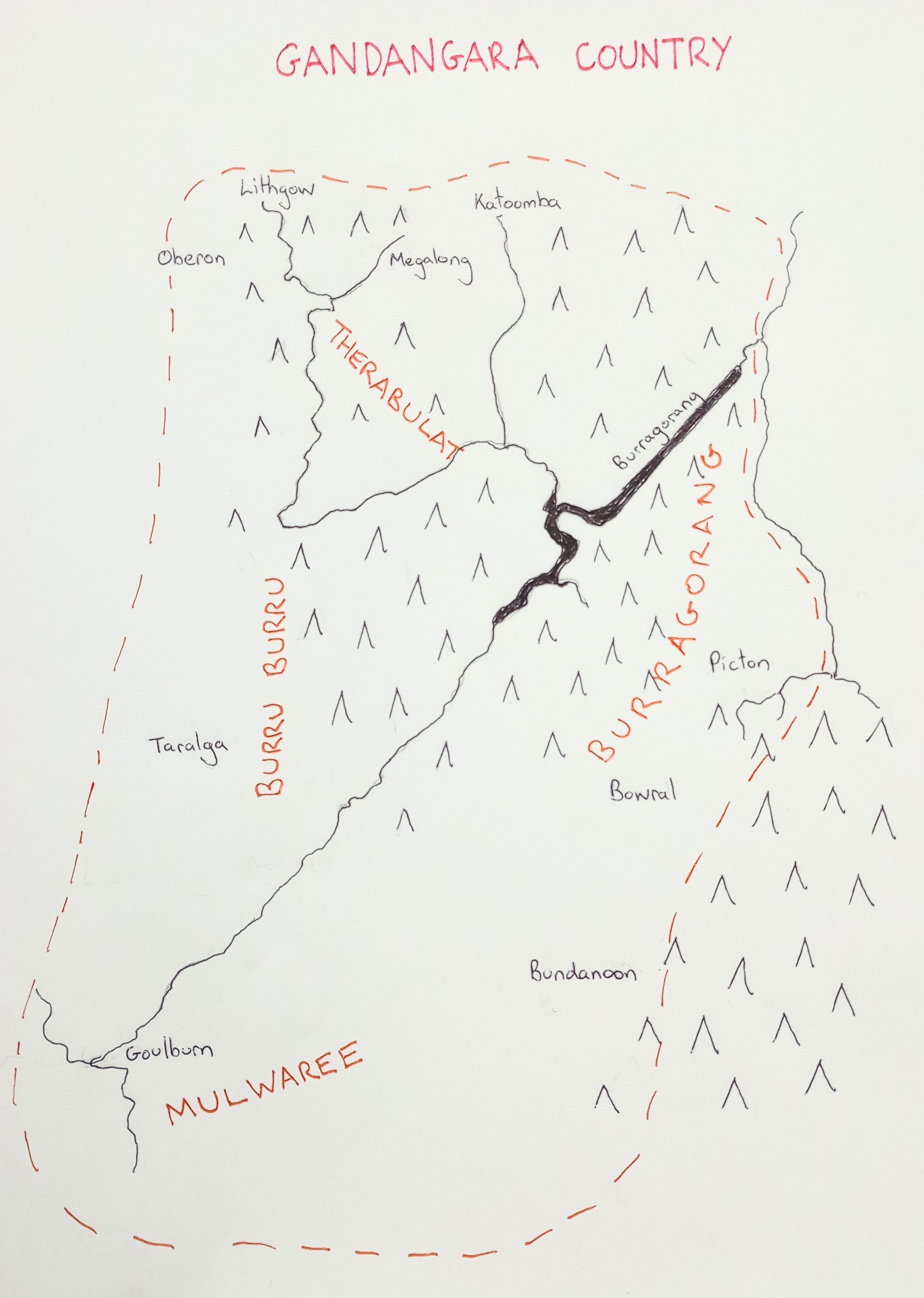
- Gandangara Country showing major clans in orange

Hierarchy
- Language family: Ngunnawal–Gundungurra
- Language branch: Yuin–Kuric
- Language group: Gundungurra
- Group dialects: Burragorang

Area (approx. 11,000 km^{2} (4,200 sq mi))
- Bioregion: Southern Highlands, Cumberland Plain, Sydney basin
- Coordinates: 34°20′S 150°0′E
- Mountains: Blue Mountains, Great Dividing Range, Southern Highlands
- Rivers: Coxs, Warragamba, Wingecarribee, Wollondilly

Notable individuals
- Cannabaygal; Duall; Charley Tarra

The Gandangara people, also spelled Gundungara, Gandangarra, Gundungurra and other variations, are an Aboriginal Australian people in south-eastern New South Wales, Australia. Their traditional lands include present day Goulburn, Wollondilly Shire, The Blue Mountains and the Southern Highlands.

== Name ==
The ethnonym Gundangara combines lexical elements signifying both "east" and "west".

== Language ==
The first attempt at a brief description of the Gundangara language was undertaken by R. H. Mathews in 1901. The language is classified as a subset of the Yuin-Kuric branch of the Pama-Nyungan language family, and is very close to Ngunnawal.

== Country ==
The Gandangara lived throughout an area covering an estimated 11,000 square kilometres (4,100 mi^{2}) in the south-east region of New South Wales. According to Norman Tindale, their lands encompassed Goulburn and Berrima, running down the Nepean River (Wollondilly) until the vicinity of Camden. This includes the catchments of the Wollondilly and Coxs rivers, and some territory west of the Great Dividing Range. It also encompasses large parts of the Blue Mountains including Katoomba and the Megalong Valley. The AIATSIS map shows their country as extending to the south, well beyond Goulburn, to the northern and eastern shorelines of Lake George, and bordering country of the Ngunawal and Yuin

Their neighbours are the Dharug and the Eora to their north, Darkinung, Wiradjuri, Ngunawal and Thurrawal, (eastwards) peoples.

== Social organisation ==
The Gandangara were formed into a variety of interconnected groups or clans, among which were:

- the Therabulat (Coxs River area)
- the Burru Burru (around Taralga)
- the Burragorang (around Nattai, Picton and Bowral)
- the Mulwaree (around Goulburn)

== History ==
=== Contact with Europeans ===
In 1802, the explorer Francis Barrallier met the Gundungara people as his party moved through "The Cowpastures" southwest of Sydney, crossing the Nattai to the Wollondilly River and up to the heights above where Yerranderie now stands. Barrallier became acquainted with a Gundungara leader named Goondel and noted in his journal that the Gundungara "themselves build huts for the strangers they wish to receive as friends." Most of their land was initially not appetizing for early settlers, given the poor quality of the Nepean sandstone soils, and in a bid to stop encroachments they are said to have petitioned Governor King successfully in order to secure protected access to their riverine yam beds. This promise was maintained until King's departure in 1807.

In 1811 Governor Macquarie started handing out numerous "land grants" to settlers in the Darawal area around Appin, one as large as 400 hectares (1,000 acres) given to William Broughton.

=== War with the British ===
In March 1814, some Aboriginal people were violently driven away after they complained of not being paid their wages for working for white settlers. In May an Aboriginal woman and three children were killed during skirmishes near the Milehouse and Butcher farms, and in retaliation, 3 Europeans were killed. Though this was on traditional Darawal lands, these fatal incidents, like a further one at Bringelly in June, were attributed to the Gandangara coming over from the west. The Gandangara joined forces with the Thurrawal/Darawal, who had linked up with remnants of the Dharug, in order to participate in the frontier war, also raiding cornfields. The decline in Dharug population had opened up parts of their territory to use by neighbouring tribal groups, which also fought among themselves.

Aside from considerations of defending their territories against the European colonial expansion, a period of severe drought may have influenced this turn in strategy. Gandangara raiding bands, harvesting crops on settlers' properties, also attacked the Thurrawal and Dharug, so that the latter two began to collaborate against them, by helping the British authorities, and seeking refuge in squatters' settlements. Like other tribes, the Gandangara had developed strategies to cope with the superior firepower of musketry, teasing troops to fire at them, in the knowledge that, once fired, some time was required to reload them, during which they could launch spearing attacks.

=== Appin massacre ===
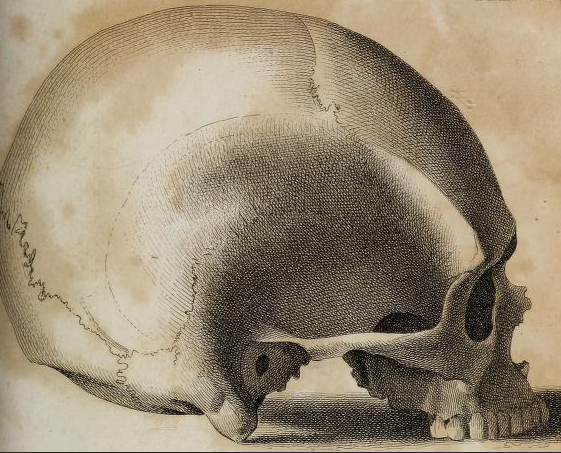
Drawing of the skull of Cannabaygal, killed during the Appin Massacre

In 1816, seven settlers were killed, four on the Nepean and three at Elizabeth Macquarie's property at Camden, when the Gandangara came out of the hills in search of food. Lachlan Macquarie ordered the 46th Regiment, under Captain James Wallis, to round up all Indigenous peoples from the Hawkesbury down to these southern areas. Those punitive expeditions aimed to strike terror into anyone surviving them. Wallis often found settlers unwilling to hand over the Darawal people who lived on their stations but, eventually, executing what he later recalled was a "melancholy but necessary duty", he tracked down a group camping under the Cataract River near Appin. According to the local historian Anne-Maree Whitaker, what followed on 17 April 1816 was a massacre.

Hearing a child's cry and a barking dog in the bush, Wallis lined up his soldiers to search for the fugitives. In the moonlight they could see figures jumping across the rocky landscape. Some of the Aborigines were shot and others were driven off the cliffs into a steep gorge. At least fourteen were killed and the only survivors were two women and three children. Among those killed was a mountain chief Cannabaygal, (Note: This name is spelled variously in reports: Wallis calls him alternatively Kincabygal and Kinnabygal; Organ writes this as Carnimbeigle; recent reports from people claiming descent from him write Kannabi Byugal.) an old man called Balyin, a Dharawal man called Dunell, along with several women and children.

Aboriginal descendants claim the figure of 14 is an underestimate, and that many more were slaughtered. The bodies of Cannabaygal and Dunell, after being decapitated, were hung from trees near Broughton's property, as a warning to foraging First Nations people. Their skulls, together with that of another beheaded woman, were exchanged for 30 shillings and a gallon of rum each in Sydney, according to the recollections of William Byrne in 1903, and were sent to England where they were lodged for study at Edinburgh University, and were only returned in 1991 and 2000. Negotiations have been underway for over a decade to have the remains, in Canberra, buried. The area believed to be the site where the Appin Massacre took place was returned to the local Aboriginal community by an act of Parliament. (Note: "Former Wollondilly state Labor MP Phil Costa confirmed that while he was in parliament he assisted with the transfer of the land believed to be location of the Appin massacre to the Aboriginal community." (Bertola 2015))

Sixteen Gandangara people were captured as prisoners after the Appin massacre and four of their children were removed to the Native Institution at Parramatta. A young man named Duall was sentenced to seven years transportation to Van Diemen's Land for "his repeated crimes and offences" during the war.

=== After the killing times ===
With the end of the war against the Gandangara, British colonists were able to enter their country and lay claims to land. In 1819, Charles Throsby and Hamilton Hume led several expeditions into Gandangara territory, utilising local men such as Cookoogong and Duall (who had his sentence at Van Diemen's Land reduced and was returned to his home country) as guides. Throsby was subsequently given large grants of land in the region by Governor Macquarie including at Throsby Park. Macquarie himself visited the area in 1820 meeting with a Gandangara elder of the Burru Burru clan named Nagaray.

Conflict with the colonisers flared in 1826 around Lake Bathurst, where local Gandangara people killed a stockman after they returned from a cultural ceremony at Bong Bong. A subsequent punitive expedition organised by armed settlers was unsuccessful and Governor Ralph Darling sent Captain Peter Bishop with a contingent of soldiers of the 40th Regiment to capture or terrify the resident tribes into submission. One Gandangara man was caught and sent to Sydney but was later released. It was claimed that no blood was shed during this military operation.

In 1828, there was some interaction between the Surveyor-General, Thomas Mitchell, and the Gandangara, near Mittagong. Mitchell was supervising road construction. The Gandarangara are said to have composed a cheeky song about the building of the road (perhaps with appropriate mimicry): Road goes creaking long shoes, Road goes uncle and brother white man see. It must have seemed that building a road just to visit kin was unnecessary effort. Men from the Gandarangara also acted as guides for Mitchell at the time. Charley Tarra, a Gandangara man from the Burru Burru clan, became famous in the early 1840s for guiding the Polish explorer Paweł Strzelecki across the Australian Alps and through Gippsland.

Notwithstanding the attempts to disperse, intimidate, round them up, or kill them, the Gandangara population took refuge in the isolated hinterlands like the Burragorang Valley or at the estates of friendly colonists, and sustained themselves to the point where in the 1860s some claimed partial restitution of their lands.

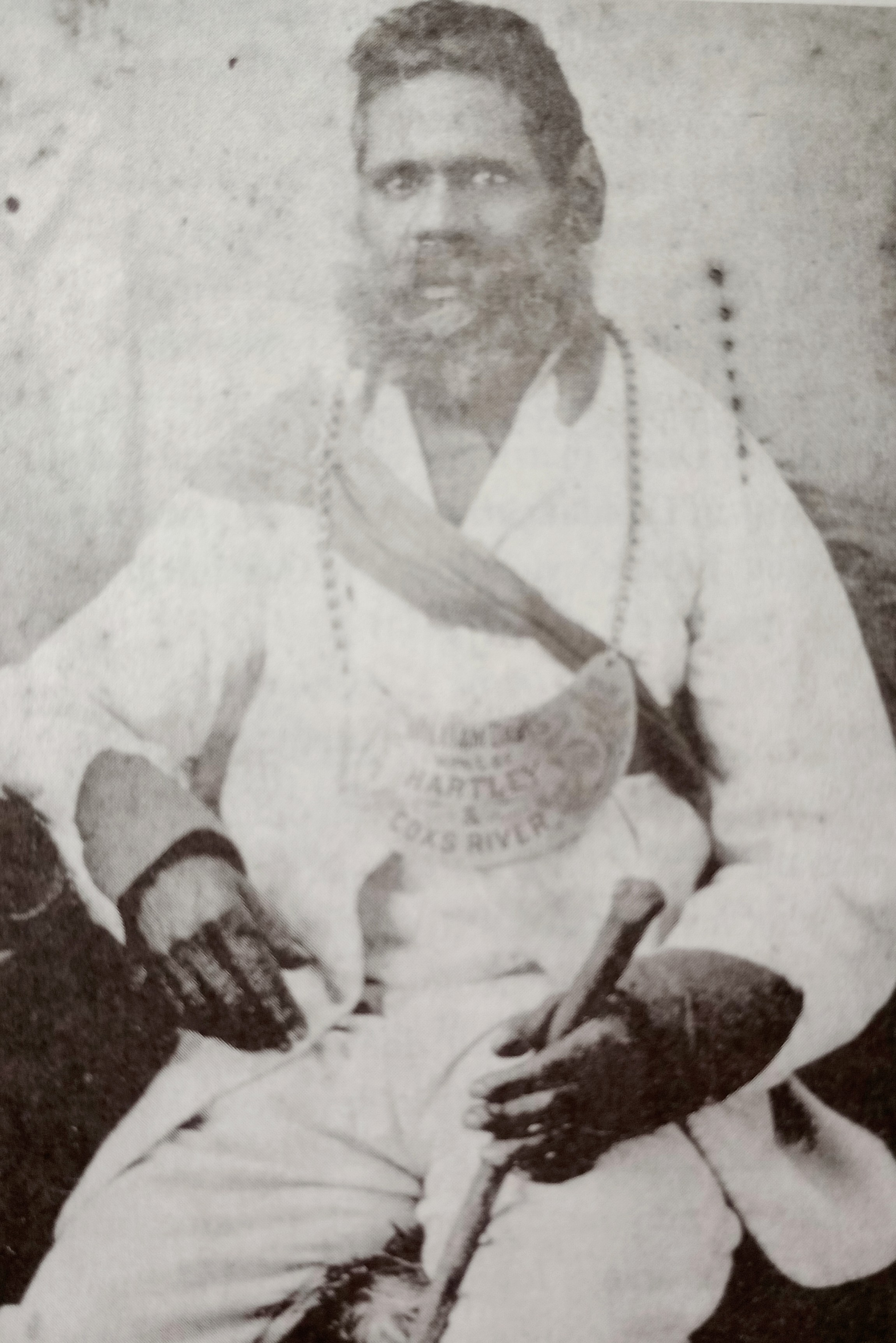
Portrait of William Davis, Gandangara man, King of Hartley and Cox's River

From 1869, several Gandangara men who had made land claims in the Burragorang Valley, also enrolled to vote in New South Wales. These men, such as George Riley, Jackey Karobin and Solomon Toliman were probably the first Aboriginal people in New South Wales and possibly Australia who were allowed to be placed on the electoral roll.

In the 1870s some Gandangara families such as William Davis were able to safely move back into traditional country from which their forebears were displaced. Davis and his wife Caroline became known by the white people as the "king" and "queen" of Hartley and the Cox's River.

=== Burragorang Valley mission, "The Gully", and Goulburn "blacks' camp" ===
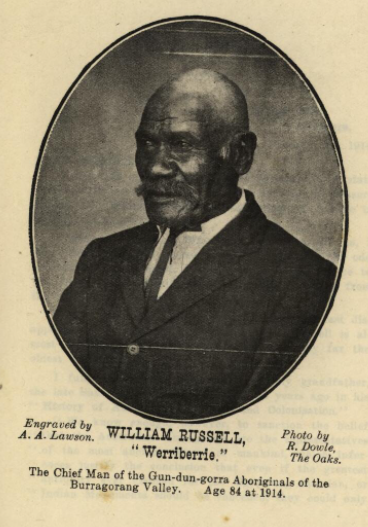
William Russell, Gandangara elder

In 1877, many of the remnant population of the Gandangara who lived around the Wollondilly, Coxs Rivers, Picton and The Oaks were gathered together by Reverend George Dillon and placed on a mission in the Burragorang Valley. It was called the St Joseph's Aboriginal Settlement located at the junction of the Cox and Wollondilly Rivers (which is now underneath Lake Burragorang due to the development of the Warragamba Dam in the mid-20th century). Around 60 Gandangara men, women and children resided there and received an English style education, Catholic religious instruction and worked the adjacent farm owned by the church.

The Gandangara of St Joseph's were interviewed in the early 1900s by the ethnographer R. H. Mathews, who took down some of their legendary lore. William Russell, a respected Gandangara elder, was a Burragorang resident and wrote an important autobiography just before his death in 1914 at the age of 84. St Joseph's produced several locally famous athletes including sprinter Stephen Sherrit and cricketer Joe Clarkson.

Some Gandangara families avoided being placed at the mission, with John Riley and John Jingery being allowed to take up small leaseholds along the Wollondilly River, while Billy Lynch's family were allowed a conditional purchase of land in the Megalong Valley. Lynch was important in the establishment of a Gandangara encampment in 1897 at "The Gully" (Garguree) near Katoomba, which became home to a significant number of Gandangara and Dharug families for several decades.

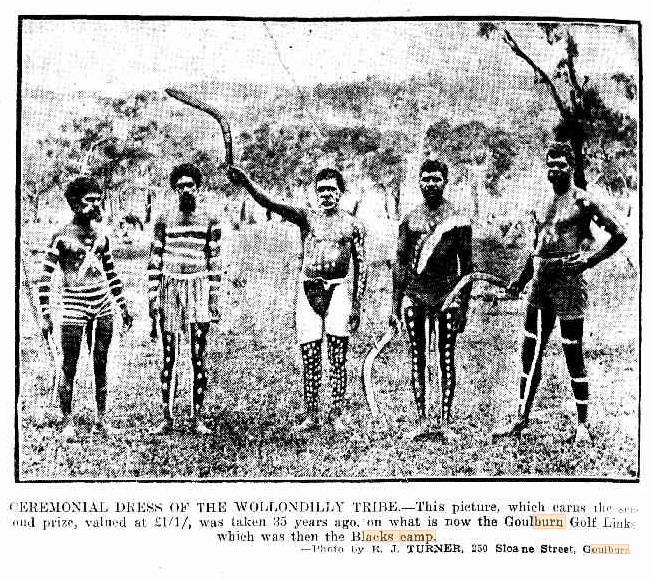
Gandangara people of Goulburn in 1888

To the south in the Goulburn area, displaced Gandangara formed a fringe dwelling settlement or "blacks' camp", but they were moved on in 1898 to make way for the Goulburn golf course.

When the St Joseph's mission at Burragorang was closed in the 1920s, most of the remaining residents were forced to move to the Aboriginal Reserve at La Perouse in coastal Sydney. Here, displaced Gandangara people became involved in Aboriginal rights, with W.G. Sherrit becoming an activist in the 1938 Day of Mourning.

== Beliefs ==
According to Gandangara belief, in the primordial dreamtime (gun-yung-ga-lung, "times far past"), there were ancestral figures known as Burringilling (human-like animals such as § Gurangatch and Mirragañ), with superhuman strength and great wisdom, capable of shaping mountains, rivers, etc. landscapes onto the pristine world.

=== Gurangatch and Mirragañ ===
External image
- "Gurangatch the Eel", Aboriginal dot art)

Two creator figures (bulla bulan), Gurangatch, a rainbow serpent (Note: Cf. comparisons by Karskens and Martin Thomas.) (Note: The additional description of "shimmering scales of green, purple and gold" may assist in the identification as rainbow serpent.) and Mirragañ, (Note: Or Mirragang) a tiger quoll, (Note: "tiger cat",) went on a journey from a point on the upper reaches of the Wollondilly River, with Mirragan pursuing the former, until the trek ended at a waterhole named Joolundoo on the Upper Fish River. The distance covered by this serpentine movement and the pursuit extended some 169 kilometres (105 mi) away. Much of this landscape with its minute Gandangara toponymic descriptions considered to be "one of the best documented Aboriginal cultural landscapes", was submerged with the construction of the Warragamba Dam after WW2.

Gurangatch, not wholly a serpent, but part fish, and part reptile, camped in the shallows of his waterhole or lagoon,lagoon called Murraural (Note: At what is now the junction of the Wollondilly and Wingecarribee Rivers. Cf. explanation below.) It was here, while he basked in the sun, that the redoubtable fish-hunter, Mirragañ the quoll, glimpsed the light reflected from Gurangatch's eyes and endeavoured, unsuccessfully, to spear him. The quoll tried to force his prey back from the depths of the waterhole, where Gurangatch had sought refuge, by submerging stacks of the nauseating bark of the millewa ("hickory"≈golden wattle (Note: One source identifies millewa here as "golden hickory" or Acacia pycnantha, i.e., golden wattle.)) at various spots in the soaks and pools. (Note: Certain formation of sheet slabs of stone, according to local legend, are the remains of the millewa bark sunk by Mirragan. Also sandstone escarpments neare Jenolan Caves were walls built by him.) Gurangatch, wise to the plan, burrowed his way out, tunneling through the landscape, drawing the lagoon waters in his train, till he emerged on a high rocky ridge called thereafter Birrimbunnungalai, since it is rich in birrimbunnung (sprats). (Note: a catchment area known to whites of the district as the "Rocky Waterhole".)

When Mirragañ caught up with his prey, he would flail away at him with a club (boodee), while Gurangatch would strike by thrashing his tormentor with a whipping from his tail. The site now called Slippery Rock, native name Wonggaree, marks a point where they engaged in struggle for a long time, wearing the rock down so smoothly that people slip on it ever since.

Such is just one of the etiological explanations of the geologic landscape etched by Gurangatch as he squirmed and burrowed through the terrain, drawing water from his hole, in flight from his predator. The epic pursuit, which started from Gurangatch's original waterhole or lagoon called Murraural (Note: Or Mur-rau'-ral) (Note: This hole was located at a stop which would later be the confluence of the yet unformed Wollondilly River and the Wingecarribee River.) ended at the Joolundoo waterhole, (Note: Smith describes this as being on the Fish River (in Oberon), though the newspaper he cites says the waterhole was on the Duckmaloi River, near which the Jelleindore Post Office was opened in 1907, at 3.5 kilometres (2.2 mi) southeast of the hole.) a distance some 170 kilometres (110 mi) apart. (Note: "The distance covered.. extended some 169 kilometres".) The Coxs River system was also created during the epic flight and pursuit, according to the myth.

The giant Gurangatch was joined by his kindred at the Jenolan Caves, and with their assistance, holed up at his final safehaven nearby. Mirragañ also gained help, going west to the waterfowls' encampment (where they were eating eels), recruiting four of the best divers: Billagoola the shag (cormorant), Gool'-a-gwan-gwan the diver (grebe), (Note: Podiceps cristatus (great crested grebe) according to J. Mathias & White, reinforced by Jim Smith's source that it refers to the Australasian grebe (Tachybaptus novaehollandiae). Even though Karskens names the bird species as musk duck.) Gundhareen the black duck (Note: Mathias & White appends scientific name as Anas superciliosa.) and Goonarring the wood duck. (Note: Mathias & White gives scientific name as Chenonetta jubata and calls is "maned duck", which is an alias of the Australian wood duck.) Two birds fail completely, Goolagwangwan surfaces with a couple of smaller-sized gurangatch or juveniles, rejected by Mirragañ as too small. The cormorant is hindered by a school of the gurangatch kindred stirring mud to hide their boss. Though he still manages to reaches the big fish, both the head and tail of the giant prey are lodged in crevices, so the bird clips off a piece of meat off the monster's back. This trophy satisfies Mirragañ, and they hold a feast with that meat.

The gurangatch was also described as being similar to a "gigantic eel" by the aforementioned native informant Billy Russell in his dying memoir. In a 2021 FlyLife article, Karl Brandt proposed the Australian lungfish as the inspiration for Gurangatch.

=== Burrubug garabang ===
In a similar creation story, two gods (bulla bulan) pursued a giant kangaroo down the Wollondilly River where it hid in a waterhole creating the Burragorang Valley. The name Burragorang is derived from Burrubug garabang meaning "the great kangaroo's place" (of escape).

== Notable people ==
- Cannabaygal, resistance leader who was executed during the Appin massacre
- Duall, an outlaw who was transported to Van Diemen's Land and later became an important guide for the colonists
- Charley Tarra, pioneering explorer who helped guide Paweł Strzelecki across the Australian Alps and into Gippsland

== See also ==
- Burragorang Valley
- Dharawal
