= Macquarie Grammar School =

Location
- 225 Clarence Street, Sydney; 33°52′14″S 151°12′18″E

Information
- Motto: Virtus | Veritas (Truth and Virtue)
- Established: 2004
- Principal: John Rekouniotis
- Website: Macquarie Grammar School

Macquarie Grammar School is a private, independent, secular, non-selective, coeducational school located in Sydney, Australia. It was established in 2004, that operates within the policies of the NESA, NSW. It is located in Sydney central business district. It was the only school to have a float in the 2014 Sydney Gay and Lesbian Mardi Gras.

== Principals ==
- 2004–2014: Dr Darryl Gauld OAM
- 2015: Paul D. Hagan
- 2016–present: John Rekouniotis
