= Appin massacre =

1816 killing of Aboriginal Australians

Coordinates: 34.2635°S 150.8035°E

- Part of Hawkesbury and Nepean Wars
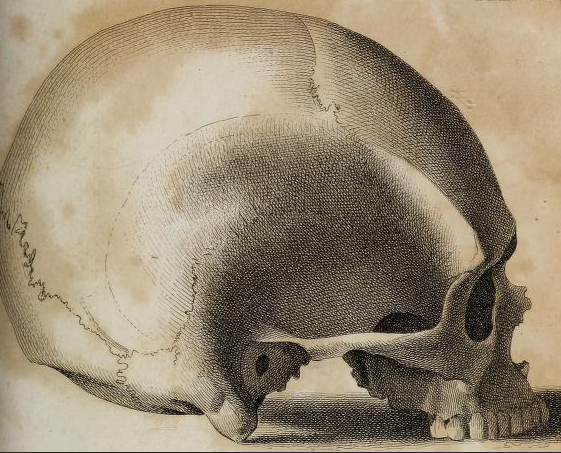
- Drawing of the skull of Cannabaygal, killed at Appin
Date	17 April 1816
Location	Appin, New South Wales, Australia
Result	British victory

Belligerents
(Kingdom of Great Britain) British colonists: New South Wales	Darug and Gandangara people

Commanders and leaders
(United Kingdom) Governor Macquarie, Captain James Wallis	Cannabaygal †

Strength
37 grenadiers	

Casualties and losses
4 settlers killed	16 Aboriginals killed

The Appin massacre was the mass murder of Aboriginal men, women and children in the New South Wales settlement of Appin, South Western Sydney, on 17 April 1816 by members of the 46th Regiment. The massacre resulted in the loss of a large number of the local Dharug and Gundungurra population, mainly due to displacement. The event was the first military ordered massacre of Aboriginal people in Australia.

Occurring during the Hawkesbury and Nepean Wars, the regiment had been ordered by Governor Macquarie to lead disciplinary commissions in and around Liverpool, the Hawkesbury, the Nepean and Grose Valley. Officer Captain James Wallis raided and killed the natives indiscriminately, driving them off ravines and shooting them. The attack violated Governor Macquarie's instructions to seek the Aboriginals' surrender as "prisoners of war" and to preserve the lives of women and children.

== Background ==
From 1815, European colonisation expanded out from the Sydney region at a greater pace. To the south-west, the ongoing Hawkesbury and Nepean Wars between the colonists and the resident Darug and Gandangara people flared. Governor Macquarie sent soldiers against the Gundungurra and Dharawal people on their lands along the Cataract River, a tributary of the Nepean River in reprisal for violent conflicts with white settlers, in which several settlers died in the adjoining Nepean and Cowpastures districts, during a time of drought. Macquarie sought to secure the Cumberland Plain and to expand settlement due west beyond the Great Dividing Range. He appointed military units around settlements to clear the land of natives and to set examples, through force and the taking of hostages, of those who resisted colonial power.

Governor Macquarie efficaciously declared war on "hostile natives" in New South Wales, appointing a campaign of "terror" against those who violently resisted British rule, ordering those who did not surrender to be killed and their corpses hung up on trees as warnings, and those that did to be taken hostage as prisoners of war, until the guilty ones surrender themselves or be exposed by their tribes for justice. Military campaigns punished Indigenous inhabitants for resisting, though as British subjects they were entitled the protections of British law and were supposed to be treated as such.

== Massacre ==
In March 1816, a punitive expedition of settlers was ambushed at Silverdale by an Aboriginal grouping armed with muskets and spears, who then killed four settlers. Governor Lachlan Macquarie ordered an armed reprisal "to inflict exemplary and severe punishment on the mountain tribes...to strike them with terror...clearing the country of them entirely." Macquarie sent three detachments of the 46th Regiment into the region with Captain James Wallis being placed in command of the detachment of grenadiers in Appin.

The punitive expedition split in two at Bent's Basin, with one group moving south-west against the Gundungurra, and the other moving south-east against the Dharawal. On 17 April, at around 1 am, this latter group of soldiers arrived on horseback at a camp of Dharawal people near Cataract Gorge (Broughton Pass). At least 16 natives were killed by shooting, and many other men, women and children were driven to fall from the cliffs of the gorge to their deaths below.

Wallis' group of 37 grenadiers and officers set out from Leumeah to scour the area around Appin and Minto in the Macarthur region. They were soon informed that a group of Aboriginal people were camping near the Cataract River. In the early morning of 17 April, at around 1 am, Wallis led a surprise attack on this camp with "smart firing" resulting in the deaths of at least fourteen Aboriginal people from both gunshot wounds or from falling off the rocky cliffs around the river while fleeing. Most of the dead were old men, women and children. Wanted men, Cannabaygal and Dunnell, who were Gandangara leaders, were also killed with Cannabaygal being shot five times. Wallis took two surviving women and three children prisoner and, following the orders of Governor Macquarie, hung the corpses of Cannabaygal and Dunnell from trees on a hill near Appin to "strike the survivors with greater terror." In 1903, senator William Byrne recalled that three were hung on McGee's Hill, whereas Captain Wallis reported two.

== Aftermath ==
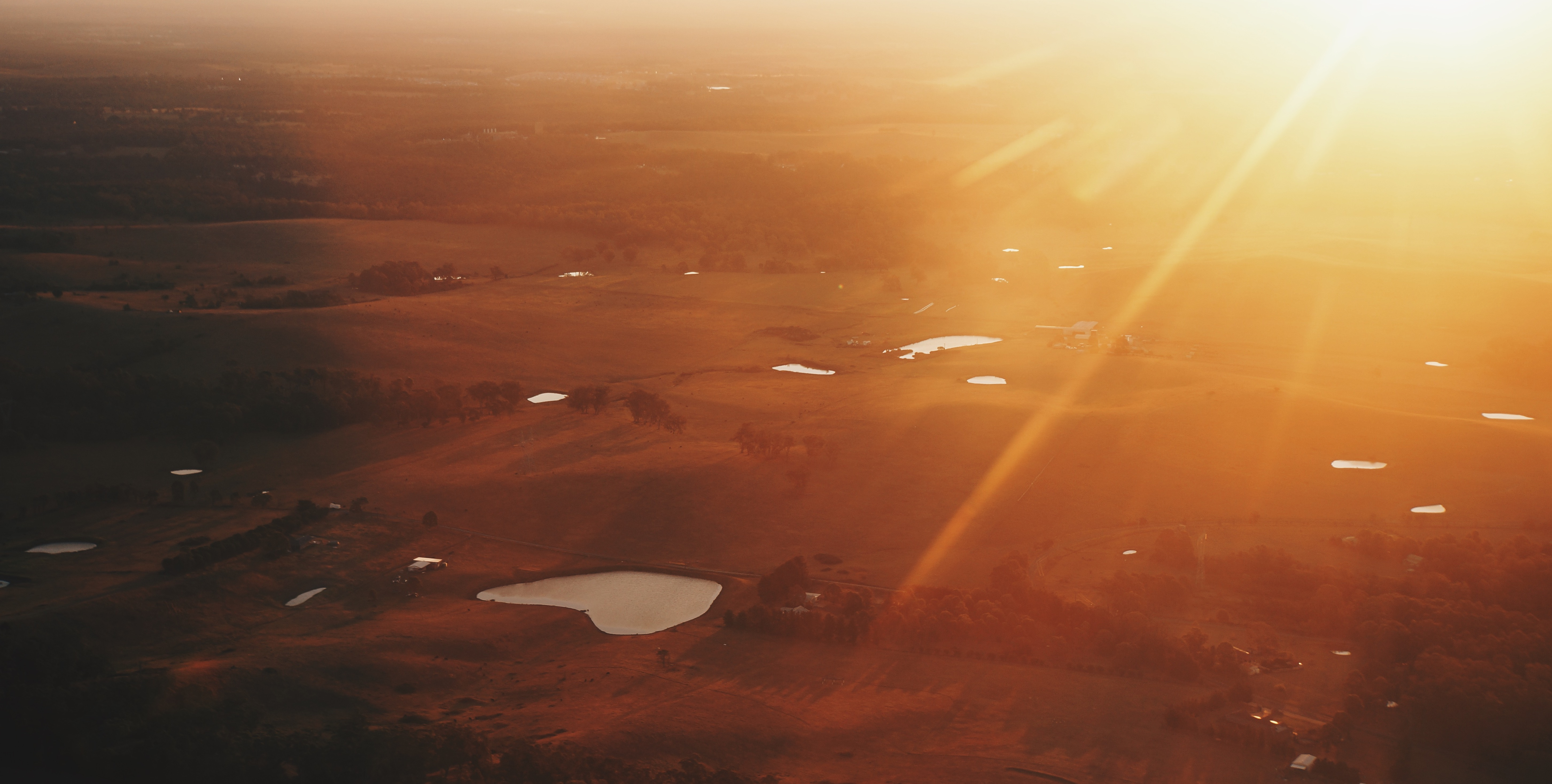
The hilly landscape of modern-day Appin

The troops decapitated the bodies and brought the heads along with the surviving natives back to Sydney CBD. Some survivors were brought to the Blacktown Native Institution Site for assimilation. Cannabaygal's skull, among other remains, was later collected and sent to the University of Edinburgh where it featured in a book on phrenology by Sir George Mackenzie. Wallis and his detachment returned to Sydney on 4 May where Governor Macquarie praised Wallis for acting "perfectly in conformity to the instructions I had furnished them." Wallis was rewarded with fifteen gallons of rum and was appointed as commandant and magistrate of the penal colony at Newcastle. The massacre resulted in displacement of the few Aboriginal survivors, many of whom fled to other parts of their country.

After James Wallis reported the event to Governor Macquarie, Macquarie then reported to his foreman in England, Henry Bathurst, 3rd Earl Bathurst. Although Captain Wallis did not acknowledge offering a surrender, nor meeting resistance from the Aboriginal clan, Macquarie informed Bathurst that many natives were "unavoidably killed and wounded" as they had not "surrendered themselves on being called on to do so", and that Wallis was compelled to react to "some resistance" from the Aboriginals.

The massacre became a critical moment in how the law dealt with Indigenous Australians. An official proclamation launched regulations to control Aboriginal people, including limiting their movements and prescribing what they may carry on their person. The law also prohibited large Aboriginal assemblages and discussed supplying passports, an authentication mark of future protectionist policies.

=== Contemporary ===
Some of the remains of the victims are stored at the National Museum Australia in Canberra. A memorial to the massacre was installed at Cataract Dam in 2007. Campbelltown City Council holds a memorial flag raising ceremony in memorial of those who perished and to show Council's sincerity to reconciliation. Furthermore, in 2022, the NSW government added the Appin massacre site to the New South Wales State Heritage Register. A proposed housing development was supposed to occur near the site of the massacre and Aboriginal cultural areas, but this was stopped by the local Aboriginal community.

== See also ==
- List of massacres of Indigenous Australians
