= Cannabaygal =

Historical leader of the Gandangara people

Cannabaygal (c.1770 – 17 April 1816), also known as Cannabayagal, Conibigal, Carnimbeigle or Kannabygle, was a warrior of the Gandangara people during the early stages of British colonisation of the Camden region in New South Wales. He was considered as one of the main leaders of local resistance to British occupation in the latter stages of the Hawkesbury and Nepean Wars. He was killed in the Appin Massacre during a campaign by James Wallis in 1816 to subjugate the Gandangara people. His corpse was gibbeted in a tree along with that of Dunelle of Muringong clan of Dharug nation and later beheaded, with both skulls being sent to Scotland for anatomical study.

== First meeting with Europeans ==
Cannabaygal first came into contact with European people in 1802 when the French-born ensign of the New South Wales Corps, Francis Barrallier, led a British expedition into the Blue Mountains west of Sydney. There was no direct interaction but Barrallier observed him and his clan hunting game with the aid of fire near the Nattai River. Other Aboriginal men who Barrallier communicated with said that this Gandangara clan was led by a prominent man named Cannabaygal.

In 1804, botanist George Caley led an expedition into the same region where he met with Cannabaygal. Caley's Aboriginal guides described Cannabaygal as a feared leader and powerful to the point of invincibility. In Caley's brief meeting with Cannabaygal, he described him as being tall, intimidating yet friendly.

== Conflict 1814-1816 ==
In 1814, conflict between Aboriginal people and the British colonists in the Camden region flared. Aboriginal and British men, women and children were killed. Raids by Gandangara, Dharug and Dharawal people plundered and destroyed crops and stock. Cannabaygal was considered by the British as one of the main leaders of these raids.

In March 1816, Governor Lachlan Macquarie formulated the biggest military operation in the colony to date to bring an end to local Aboriginal resistance in that region. Macquarie declared that 'exemplary and severe punishment' was needed to drive these clans away, and he ordered 'strong detachments of troops...to strike them with terror'.

Three detachments of the 46th Regiment were organised in April 1816 and sent out to make large sweeps of the region. Macquarie ordered any Aboriginal people found were to surrender as prisoners of war or be fired upon. The bodies of those killed were to be hung in trees to cause greater terror to the survivors. Macquarie also ordered children to be taken and given up to institutions to be taught European ways.

== Death during a massacre ==
The detachment sent after the Gandangara was led by Captain James Wallis who was in charge of thirty-three grenadiers, two sergeants and several Aboriginal guides including one named Colebee. They tracked Cannabaygal's clan to the upper reaches of the Cataract River. In the early hours of the morning of 17 April 1816, Wallis' force approached the campsite of Cannabaygal's people but found that it was a deserted decoy camp. However, the cry of a child alerted the soldiers to the real camp nearby and they attacked. At least fourteen of the clan were massacred either by being shot or from injuries as they fled down the steep rocky hillside that bordered the camp. This has become known as the Appin Massacre.

Cannabaygal was shot five times and killed. Another Gandangara leader named Dunelle also died. Most of the others killed were women and old men. In line with Macquarie's instructions, the corpses of Cannabaygal and Dunelle were gibbeted from a tree on a nearby prominent hill.

== Skull sent to the University of Edinburgh ==
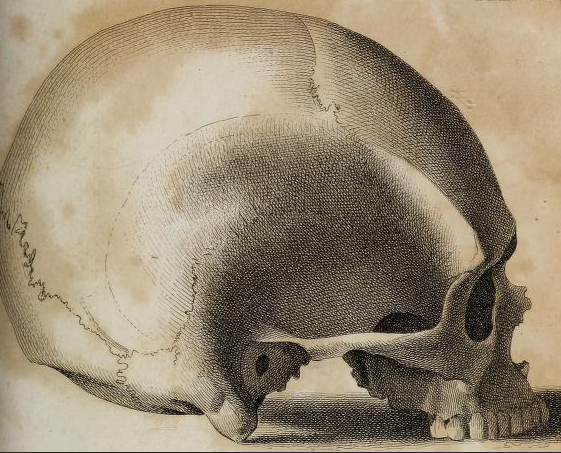
Drawing of the skull of Cannabaygal, killed at Appin

Not long after his body was taken down from the tree, Cannabaygal's head was removed, as was that of Dunelle's and also a woman who had been killed in the massacre. The heads were taken to Sydney where the colonial government bought them for 30 shillings and a gallon of rum each. The heads were removed of flesh to obtain the skulls of Cannabaygal and the others. These skulls were sent to the University of Edinburgh where Cannabaygal's was featured in an 1820 book on phrenology by Sir George Mackenzie. Mackenzie believed that the anatomy of Cannabaygal's skull displayed the weak reasoning powers and strong emotions of Aboriginal Australians, with this view typical of early phrenological study.

Cannabaygal's skull was repatriated to Australia in 1991.

== See also ==
- List of Indigenous Australian historical figures
