= Bullen's African Lion Safari Park =

Bullen's African Lion Safari Park was the name of several open-range safari parks in Australia:

- African Lion Safari (Warragamba), New South Wales, opened by Stafford Bullen
- Wanneroo Lion Park, originally named Bullen's African Lion Safari Park, in Carabooda, Western Australia

== See also ==
- Bullen's Animal World, Wallacia, New South Wales
