= Alfred Percival Bullen =

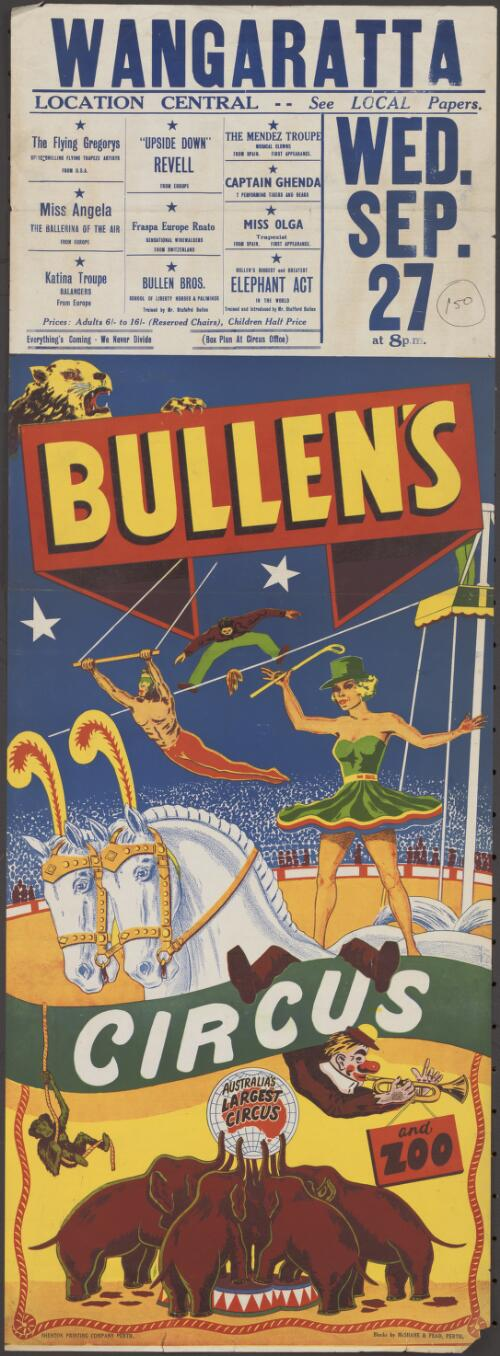
- poster from 1935 to 1955
- Born: 8 February 1896; Kiama, New South Wales
- Died: 11 August 1974 (aged 78); Penrith, New South Wales
- Occupation: circus proprietor
- Known for: Bullen's Circus
- Spouse: Lilian Ethel Bullen (born Croan)

Alfred Percival Bullen (February 8, 1896 in Kiama, New South Wales – August 11, 1974 in Penrith, New South Wales) was, along with his wife, Lilian Ethel Bullen and brother, a founder of Bullen's Circus.

== Life ==
Alfred, also known as Perce, was the son of Alfred Weston Bullen and his wife Alice who were originally from New Zealand. He started his career with a performing pony and a sheep. Alfred married a dancer named Lilian Ethel Croan in 1917. She had been born on 8 May 1894 in Sydney and she had been in show business since she was a child. Beginning with a merry-go-round Lilian, Alfred and his brother started a travelling circus carnival. They had performing animals including an elephant and a lion. By 1922 they had enough money to create Bullen's Circus.

During the 1930s the circus expanded and its new assets belonged to Lilian. She had the forceful personality and she and three girl dancers formed the "Four Marzellas".

They had a surprising success during the second world war when the shortage of petrol forced the circus to stop touring at Yeppoon. However there was an American air base nearby and the Bullen's made a success of performing several shows a day. The circus employed more girls than it had ever done when it was touring before the war.

They had three sons, Stafford Bullen, Kenneth Bullen and Gregory Bullen and adopted daughter and son Mavis and Jules.

In 1960 television arrived in Australia and in that year there were 17 circuses touring the country. The largest "Wirth's" ceased touring in 1963 after 80 years.

Lilian died of cancer on 4 January 1965. Alfred remarried a widow named Daisy Ruth Wood on the 3 January 1969.

== Death and legacy ==
Bullen's Circus gave a final performance on 25 May 1969 and happily retired to the family estate at Wallacia, New South Wales, Australia. Alfred and Lilian's sons established an African Lion Safari and Bullen's Animal World. Alfred Bullen is buried at Pinegrove Memorial Park, Minchinbury, New South Wales, Australia.

In 2006 ABCTV made a programme about the Bullen family and the remaining legacy of animals that the family still cared for.
