= John Blaxland =

John Blaxland may refer to:

- John Blaxland (explorer) (1769–1845), pioneer settler and explorer in Australia
- John Blaxland (politician) (1801–1884), English-born Australian politician
- John Blaxland (historian) (born 1963), Australian historian and academic

== See also ==
- Blaxland (disambiguation)
