= Blaxland =

Blaxland can refer to:

== People ==
- Gregory Blaxland (1778–1853), pioneer farmer and explorer in Australia, brother of John
- Jasper Blaxland (1880–1963), English consultant surgeon
- John Blaxland (explorer), pioneer settler and explorer in Australia, brother of Gregory Blaxland (1778–1853)
- John Blaxland (politician) (1799–1884), member of NSW Legislative Council, a son of Gregory Blaxland (1778–1853)
- John Blaxland (historian), Australian historian and academic
- Lionel Blaxland (1898–1976), English aviator, cricketer, schoolmaster and clergyman
- James Graham-Brown (born 1951), cricketer and playwright who writes under the pen name "Dougie Blaxland"

== Other uses ==
- Blaxland, New South Wales, a small town
- Division of Blaxland, a NSW electoral district in the Australian House of Representatives
- Blaxland, Queensland, a locality in the Western Downs Region

== See also ==
- Blaxlands Ridge, New South Wales, a suburb near Sydney
- Blaxland Crossing Reserve, a parkland in Western Sydney
