= Bullen's Animal World =

Former zoo in Wallacia, New South Wales, Australia

Coordinates: 33.8658°S 150.6412°E

- Interactive map of Bullen's Animal World
- Date opened: 17 January 1970
- Date closed: 1985
- Location: 11 Park Rd, Wallacia, New South Wales, Australia
- Land area: 242 ha (600 acres) [121 ha (299 acres) was in use of the land for the park]
- Owner: Stafford Bullen

Bullen's Animal World was a circus style zoo and theme park located at Wallacia, New South Wales, Australia on the outskirts of Sydney owned by the Bullen family of circus proprietors. Its address was 11 Park Road, Wallacia. An equivalent one, Bullen's African Lion Safari, existed nearby at Warragamba a few kilometres away; as well as the Wanneroo Lion Park in Wanneroo in Perth. Upon its closure, some of the animals were moved to the lion park at Warragamba, while some were moved to a property a kilometre away, also in Wallacia, also owned by the Bullen family.

== Background ==
The park was established in 1969 by Stafford Bullen, the son of circus founder Alfred Percival Bullen, officially opened to visitors in January 1970, and operated until 1985. Its closure was to foreshadow the closure of Bullen's other nearby venture, the African Lion Safari, in 1991.

The park has numerous animal rides and amusement rides – go-carts, mini-bikes, jet boat, raft boat rides, water bikes, tractor rides, chair lifts, helicopter rides, giant slides, suspension bridge and giant play equipment. There are 8 kilometres of drive-through roads in the park.

It included animals such as:

- American bison
- Asian elephants
- Asian water buffalos
- Black swans
- Black-backed jackals
- Blackbucks
- Bobcat
- Cattle
- Chimpanzees
- Common wallaroos
- Common wombat
- Domestic goats
- Domestic sheep
- Donkeys
- Dromedary camels
- Eastern grey kangaroos
- Emus
- Fallow deer
- Galah
- Guinea pigs
- Hamadryas baboons
- Huskies
- Jaguars
- Leopards
- Llamas
- Mandrills
- Ostriches
- Plains zebras
- Ponies
- Pumas
- Rabbits
- Raccoons
- Red deer
- Red kangaroos
- Red-necked wallabies
- Red-rumped agoutis
- Rhesus macaques
- Tigers
