= Bossiaea oligosperma =

Few-seeded bossiaea

Conservation status
- Vulnerable (EPBC Act)

Scientific classification
- Kingdom: Plantae
- Clade: Tracheophytes
- Clade: Angiosperms
- Clade: Eudicots
- Clade: Rosids
- Order: Fabales
- Family: Fabaceae
- Subfamily: Faboideae
- Genus: Bossiaea
- Species: B. oligosperma

Binomial name
- Bossiaea oligosperma A.T.Lee

Species of legume

Bossiaea oligosperma, commonly known as few-seeded bossiaea, is a species of flowering plant in the family Fabaceae and is endemic to eastern New South Wales. It is an erect shrub with broadly egg-shaped to more or less round leaves with a small point on the tip, and yellow and red flowers.

== Description ==
Bossiaea oligosperma is an erect shrub that typically grows to a height of 1–2 m (3 ft 3 in – 6 ft 7 in), and has hairy young stems. The leaves are broadly elliptic to more or less round, 2.5–5 mm (0.098–0.197 in) long and wide long with dark brown stipules 1.0–1.5 mm (0.039–0.059 in) long at the base. The lower surface of the leaves is hairy and there is a short, down-turned point on the tip. The flowers are 8–11 mm (0.31–0.43 in) long and borne singly in leaf axils with reddish bracts at the base. The five sepals are 3–4 mm (0.12–0.16 in) long and joined at the base forming a tube with lobes about 1 mm (0.039 in) long. There are bracteoles about 1 mm (0.039 in) long near the base of the pedicel. The standard petal and wings are yellow with red markings, and the keel is pink to dark red. Flowering occurs from August to November and the fruit is an elliptic pod 10–12 mm (0.39–0.47 in) long.

== Taxonomy and naming ==
Bossiaea oligosperma was first formally described in 1981 by Alma Theodora Lee in the journal Telopea from specimens collected near Warragamba. The specific epithet (oligosperma) means "few-seeded".

== Distribution and habitat ==
This bossiaea grows in forest, and is found between Warragamba and the Araluen Valley in eastern New South Wales.

== Conservation status ==
Few-seeded bossiaea is listed as "vulnerable" under the Australian Government Environment Protection and Biodiversity Conservation Act 1999 and the New South Wales Government Biodiversity Conservation Act 2016.
