= Hibbertia acaulothrix =

Conservation status
- Endangered (NSWBCA)

Scientific classification
- Kingdom: Plantae
- Clade: Tracheophytes
- Clade: Angiosperms
- Clade: Eudicots
- Order: Dilleniales
- Family: Dilleniaceae
- Genus: Hibbertia
- Species: H. acaulothrix

Binomial name
- Hibbertia acaulothrix Toelken
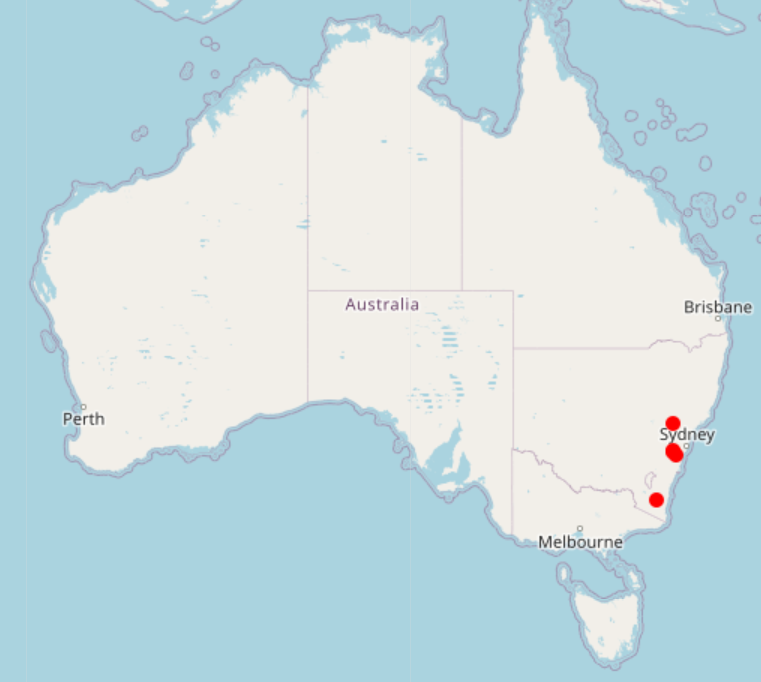
- Occurrence data from AVH

Species of flowering plant

Hibbertia acaulothrix is a species of flowering plant in the family Dilleniaceae and is endemic to New South Wales. It is an erect shrub with lance-shaped leaves and yellow flowers arranged singly, with nine to thirteen stamens arranged around the carpels.

== Description ==
Hibbertia acaulothrix is an erect shrub that typically grows to a height of up to 1.1 m (3 ft 7 in), with ridged or flanged branchlets. The leaves are lance-shaped to wedge-shaped, 6–15 mm (0.24–0.59 in) long and 2–5 mm (0.079–0.197 in) wide and more or less sessile. The flowers are arranged singly in leaf axils or on the ends of side shoots, with bracts 8–10 mm (0.31–0.39 in) long and about 2 mm (0.079 in) wide. The five sepals are joined at the base with linear to lance-shaped lobes 6–7 mm (0.24–0.28 in) long and about 2–5 mm (0.079–0.197 in) wide. The five petals are yellow, 7–10 mm (0.28–0.39 in) long and 5–7 mm (0.20–0.28 in) wide and there are between nine and thirteen stamens and a few staminodes arranged around the carpels. Flowering has been recorded from October to April.

== Taxonomy ==
Hibbertia acaulothrix was first formally described in 2012 by Hellmut R. Toelken in the Journal of the Adelaide Botanic Gardens from specimens collected by John D. Briggs near Bemboka in 1986. The specific epithet (acaulothrix) means "stalkless hair", referring to the hairs of this species compared to those of the similar Hibbertia hermanniifolia.

== Distribution and habitat ==
This hibbertia grows on sedimentary rocks in woodland between Wollemi National Park and south to the Wadbilliga National Park.

== See also ==
- List of Hibbertia species
