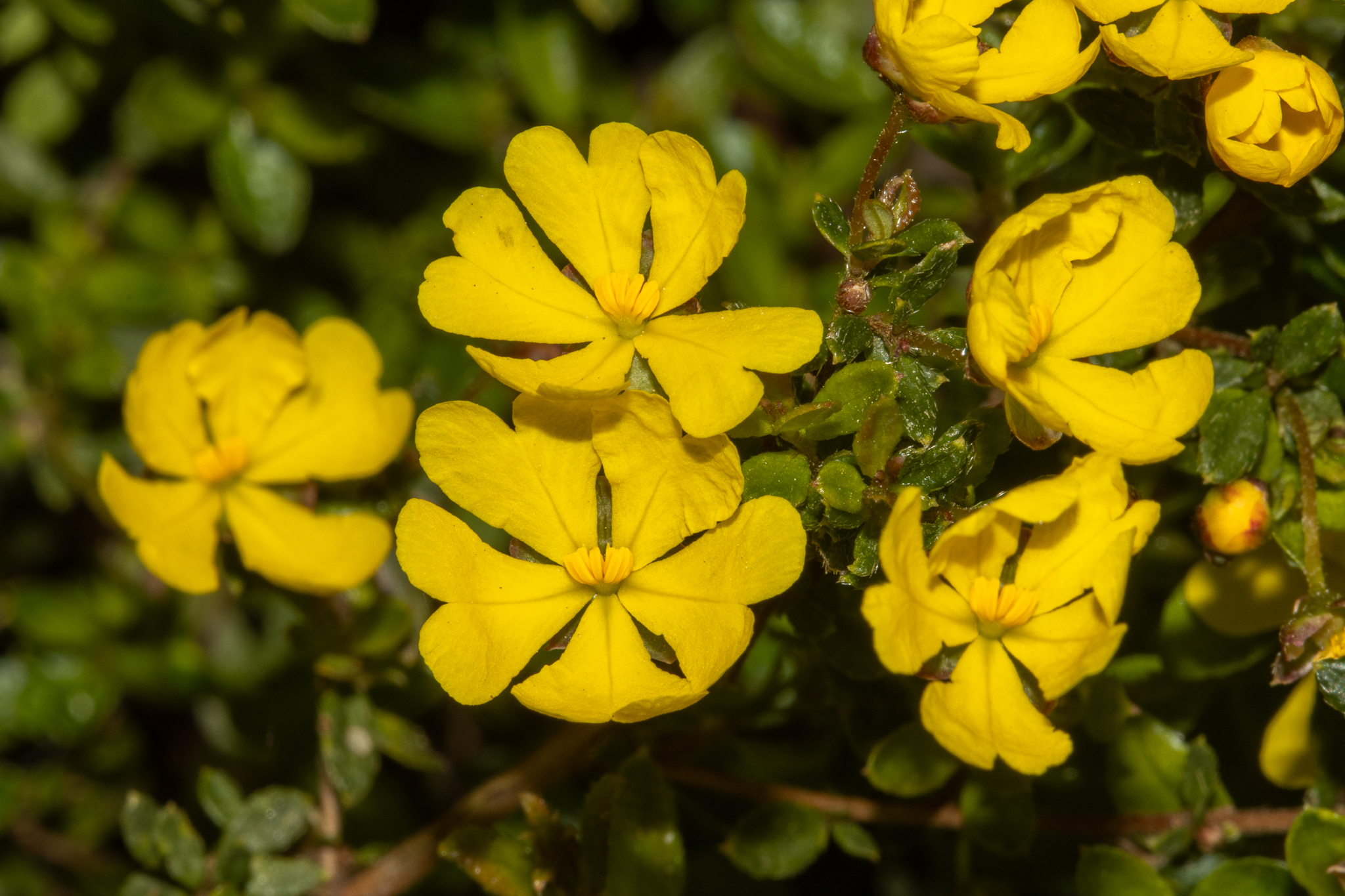

Scientific classification
- Kingdom: Plantae
- Clade: Embryophytes
- Clade: Tracheophytes
- Clade: Spermatophytes
- Clade: Angiosperms
- Clade: Eudicots
- Order: Dilleniales
- Family: Dilleniaceae
- Genus: Hibbertia
- Species: H. appressa

Binomial name
- Hibbertia appressa Toelken

Synonyms
- List: Hibbertia appressa Toelken nom. inval.; Hibbertia billardierei F.Muell. nom. illeg., nom. superfl. p.p.; Hibbertia billardierei F.Muell. var. billardierei p.p.; Hibbertia billardierei var. ovata Benth.; Hibbertia billardieri Benth. orth. var. p.p.; Hibbertia billardieri var. ovata Benth. orth. var.; Hibbertia billardierii F.Muell. orth. var. p.p.; Hibbertia ovata (Labill.) Druce nom. illeg.; Hibbertia ovata (Labill.) Domin nom. illeg.; Hibbertia ovata (Labill.) Ewart nom. illeg.; Hibbertia ovata var. typica Domin nom. inval.; Pleurandra ovata Labill. p.p.; Pleurandra ovata Labill. var. ovata p.p.; Pleurandra ovata var. prostrata Hook.f. nom. inval.; Hibbertia asterotricha auct. non N.A.Wakef.: Wakefield, N.A. (1957); Hibbertia astrotricha auct. non (Sieber ex Spreng.) N.A.Wakef.: Wakefield, N.A. (1957); Hibbertia astrotricha auct. non (Sieber ex Spreng.) N.A.Wakef.: Willis, J.H. (1973) p.p.; Hibbertia billardierei var. obovata auct. non R.Br. ex Benth.: Bentham, G. (30 May 1863); Hibbertia billardieri var. obovata auct. non Benth.: Bentham, G. (30 May 1863) p.p.; Hibbertia empetrifolia auct. non (DC.) Hoogland: Hoogland, R.D. (1974); Hibbertia empetrifolia auct. non (DC.) Hoogland: Curtis, W.M. & Morris, D.I. (1975); Hibbertia empetrifolia auct. non (DC.) Hoogland: Gray, M. in Society for Growing Australian Plants Maroondah, Inc. (1993); Hibbertia empetrifolia auct. non (DC.) Hoogland: Toelken, H.R. in Walsh, N.G. & Entwisle, T.J. (ed.) (1996) p.p.

= Hibbertia appressa =

Trailing guinea flower

Species of flowering plant

Hibbertia appressa, commonly known as trailing guinea flower, is a species of flowering plant in the family Dilleniaceae and is endemic to south-eastern Australia. It is a low-lying or scrambling shrub with lance-shaped to egg-shaped leaves and yellow flowers with nine to twelve stamens arranged in a single group.

== Description ==
Hibbertia appressa is a shrub up to 2 m (6 ft 7 in) high with erect to low-lying or srambling branches .03–1 m (1.2 in – 3 ft 3.4 in) long. The leaves are lance-shaped to egg-shaped or elliptic, 3.5–9 mm (0.14–0.35 in) long and 2–5 mm (0.079–0.197 in) wide and on a petiole up to 1 mm (0.039 in) long. The midrib on the lower surface of the leaves is covered with flattened hairs, pressed against the surface. The flowers are arranged singly on the ends of branches on a peduncle 2.1–12.6 mm (0.083–0.496 in) long with tapering linear bracts 1.1–2.5 mm (0.043–0.098 in) long. The five sepals are tinged with red and joined at the base, the outer lobes 2.3–4.5 mm (0.091–0.177 in) long and the inner lobes slightly longer. The five petals are bright yellow and wedge-shaped, 3.6–9.4 mm (0.14–0.37 in) long. There are nine to twelve stamens fused in a single group at the lower half, and there are two carpels. Flowering mainly occurs from September to December.

== Taxonomy ==
Hibbertia appressa was first described in 1998 by Hellmut R. Toelken in the Journal of the Adelaide Botanic Gardens, but the description was not validly published because it lacked a Latin description and the type was not specified. In 2000, Toelken corrected the omissions and the type selected was collected by R.D. Hoogland on Mount Elizabeth in 1970.

== Distribution and habitat ==
Trailing guinea flower grows in moist place in woodland or the edges of forest, often on the lower slopes of mountains in southern Victoria and northern, eastern and south-eastern Tasmania.

== See also ==
- List of Hibbertia species
