= Blaxland Crossing Reserve =

Park in Wallacia, New South Wales

Coordinates: 33°51′46″S 150°38′22″E

- Entrance to the reserve, showing a tree-lined pathway and picnic tables.
- Interactive map of Blaxland Crossing Reserve
- Location: Wallacia, New South Wales, Australia
- Area: 8.4 hectares (21 acres)
- Established: 1931
- Operator: Penrith City Council

Blaxland Crossing Reserve, also known as Blaxland Crossing Recreation Reserve, is a public park in Wallacia, New South Wales, Australia, situated near the Nepean River on Silverdale Road. The reserve covers approximately 8.4 hectares (21 acres) and contains picnic tables and playground facilities.

== History ==
The reserve is named after John Blaxland, who used a ford across the Nepean River to access his grazing land on the western bank. The ford was reinforced with river pebbles, which were also used to construct a road leading to his flour mill and brewery. The original crossing was later concealed beneath the alignment of a bridge built in 1859. In 1813, Governor Lachlan Macquarie granted Blaxland land encompassing much of present-day Luddenham and Wallacia, where he established a homestead, flour mill and brewery. Blaxland's Crossing was recorded in a 19th-century government document, including a road listed between Penrith Municipality and Werombi Post Office.

The reserve was established in 1931. In 1962, the New South Wales Department of Lands reported a grant of £2,500 to the reserve. The reserve's main gates were officially opened on 3 September 1981 by A. R. L. Gordon, then New South Wales Minister for Lands. In June 2009, Drive.com.au included Blaxland Crossing Reserve in its guide to Sydney's best driving routes, describing it as a picnic spot beside the Nepean River.

== Flora ==
Grassy parkland, with mature trees and picnic tables.

The reserve contains remnant native vegetation, including Eucalyptus benthamii (Camden white gum), a critically endangered species. In June 2006, botanists collected seeds from four trees at the reserve for the Millennium Seed Bank Project.

== Recreation and community events ==
The reserve provides open space for informal recreation, including walking and running. Penrith City Council's 2020 Sport and Recreation Strategy identified the reserve as a site for investigating future recreational opportunities. The reserve is also associated with the adjoining Wallacia Caravan Park, which provides facilities for caravans and other vehicle-based camping.

The reserve formerly hosted an annual gathering of the Assyrian community, called New Sunday Church Picnic, in September to commemorate Saint Zaia. In the 2000s, the event generally attracted approximately 5,000 attendees and it featured food, family entertainment, live Assyrian music and traditional dancing. In September 2003, a brawl involving up to 50 people broke out during a picnic attended by members of the Assyrian Church of the East, resulting in several minor injuries.

== Maintenance and rehabilitation ==
In May 2015, the Tenants' Union of NSW reported concerns about emergency vehicle access through the reserve to the adjoining Blaxland Crossing Wallacia Caravan Park. The route was described as poorly signposted and unlit, with residents reporting difficulties for ambulances, particularly at night and during wet weather. The Blaxland Crossing Recreation and Rest Grounds Trust subsequently began investigating improvements to the caravan park's entry system.

In the 2024–25 financial year, Penrith City Council reported expenditure of $3,685 on drainage works at the reserve. In July 2025, the council also awarded a $272,217.60 contract to Axial Construction Pty Ltd for rehabilitation works at the reserve.
