= Stafford Bullen =

Australian circus proprietor

Stafford Bullen (20 March 1925, in Bathurst, New South Wales – 12 November 2001, in Sydney) was an Australian circus proprietor and co-founder of the African Lion Safari, Warragamba.

== Life ==
Bullen was born to parents Alfred Percival and Lilian Bullen. In 1922 they founded Bullen's Circus. His circus career began at four, travelling the country as a child. He had a tutor and was an above average student, yet his formal education ceased at age fourteen.

Stafford and his brother Ken Bullen ran the family business after their mother died in 1965. In 1968 they opened the African Lion Safari. It attracted over 200,000 visitors annually. In 1969 Bullen's Animal World opened at Wallacia, New South Wales.

Stafford married Cleo; they had four children: Mark, Brenton, Sonya and Craig.
