= Wanneroo Lion Park =

Former open-range zoo in Australia

- Interactive map of Wanneroo Lion Park
- Date opened: 1971; 55 years ago
- Date closed: 1988; 38 years ago
- Location: Carabooda, Western Australia

Wanneroo Lion Park, formerly Bullen's African Lion Safari Park, was an open-range zoo in Carabooda, in the north of Perth, Western Australia. It operated for 17 years, between 1971 and 1988. Wanneroo Lion Park was the only open-range zoo to have operated in Western Australia.

== History ==
The park was opened on 21 August 1971 by brothers Ken and Stafford Bullen, in partnership with television station TVW7 and Michael Edgley, following the closure of Bullens Circus in 1969, and the success of similar ventures in New South Wales. There were 32 lions and four cubs, in two separated prides, when it opened. Cars and tourist buses would drive through the park, and the lions would come up to and onto the vehicles. They would bite anything attached to the vehicles, especially windscreen wipers and tyres, and windows needed to be kept up to prevent them putting their paws inside. A separate compound contained various other animals, and there were circus shows featuring cockatoos and monkeys.

The park received much media attention, especially following incidents of injuries and reported escapes of lions (see incidents). The safari raised money for the Lions Club of Wanneroo, and lion cubs would appear on Telethon. Lion cubs were also sent to appear in events in regional areas, such as the 1976 FeNaCl Festival in Dampier, where two cubs were inducted into the Dampier Lions Club, becoming the first female members.

American actress Tippi Hedren visited the park in 1981, and voiced her dismay at the treatment of lions to the media. In the same year, the RSPCA investigated the animals' welfare, which resulted in the park improving the lions' care. In 1988, the park closed due to the high costs associated with public liability insurance and feeding the animals, and amid dissent from animal rights activists. The lions were shot, as there was nowhere for them to be released or transferred.

In 2014 the City of Wanneroo's Regional Museum collected stories and materials related to the park, including making two oral history recordings of former park workers John and Fran Gilbertson, and Marion Colmer.

As of January 2026, Wanneroo Lion Park was the only open-range zoo to have operated in Western Australia. A new open-range zoo was considered in 2011, and in 2016 premier Colin Barnett floated plans for Perth Zoo to operate a new open-range venue in the Perth Hills; however this venture was abandoned following the change in government at the 2017 state election.

== Incidents ==
Throughout its existence the park suffered a number of incidents involving its lions. In 1971, a man had his arm clawed when a lion pushed down the car window, and later died in hospital following a reaction to the anaesthetic. A second death occurred in 1982, an apparent suicide in which a man walked out of his cars towards the lions. In 1977, lions escaped their enclosure, killed goats, and injured a donkey, and in the mid-1980s there were reports a lion had escaped the park, which were investigated by the police.

== See also ==
- African Lion Safari (Warragamba)
