= Bents Basin State Conservation Area =

Protected area in New South Wales, Australia

- IUCN category II (national park)
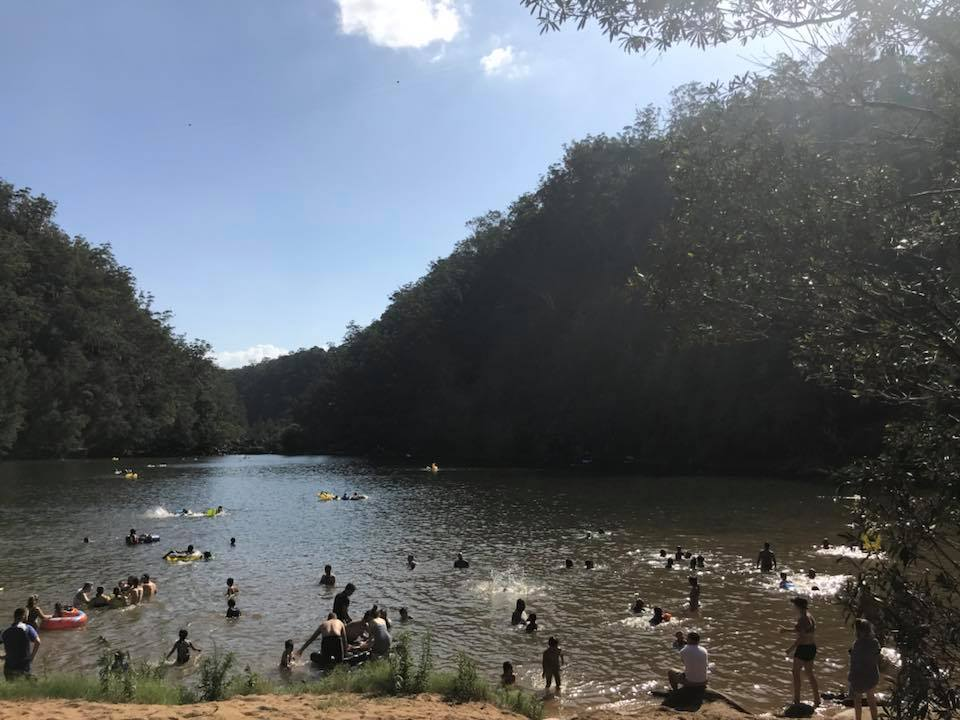
- The basin, which is also a swimming area.

- Location within New South Wales
- Location: New South Wales
- Nearest city: Silverdale; Wallacia
- Coordinates: 33°55′55.2″S 150°38′6″E
- Area: 0.62 km^{2} (0.24 sq mi)
- Established: 21 November 1980
- Governing body: NSW National Parks and Wildlife Service
- Website: http://www.environment.nsw.gov.au/NationalParks/parkHome.aspx?id=N0441

Bents Basin is a protected nature reserve and state park near Wallacia, New South Wales, Australia in the Sydney metropolitan area. The lake basin, which formed at the efflux of the Nepean River from the Hawkesbury Sandstone (Sydney sandstone) gorge, is a popular swimming hole with a camping area and an education centre used by local school groups. Also featuring a large woodland area and native wildlife, the reserve is the only picnic area along the Nepean River and it is one of the most popular water-based picnic parks in Greater Western Sydney.

== History ==
Aboriginal Australians were denizens of the area due to its vicinity to the Nepean River, which featured food and water. The Basin is believed to have been a traditional meeting and trading place between Aboriginal groups. Having spiritual and cultural significance to Aboriginal communities, camps were used to provide an opportunity for Aboriginal people to connect with each other and their culture.

Bents Basin was discovered in 1804 by the botanist George Caley, who named it 'Dovedale', where it has since then been a popular place for botanists. The site was originally a small natural basin formed in an erosion basin banked by sandstone outcrops, considerably enlarged with a large earth fill dam constructed by the Army's 17th Construction Squadron in 1987–88.

A prominent inn was located within the park and is listed on the NSW State Heritage Inventory. The inn was built in the 1860s and the site is of local importance, as it gives details of western Sydney's history, early road networks and the rise and fall of rural communities in the region. Destroyed in the 1950s, the inn's location is marked by a pepper tree (Schinus areira). The Basin was reserved as State Recreation Area in 1994.

== Geography ==
The Basin features a floodplain and is on a plateau. The basin is a circular lagoon-like pool that is 120 metres (394 feet) across and over 22 metres (72 feet) at its deepest, travelling about 150 kilometres (93 mi) northeast (through Hawkesbury River) before reaching the ocean in Central Coast. Bents Basin is around 36 km south of Penrith and 56 km south-west of Sydney central business district. To the east of the basin is a cleared undulating paddock on the clay soils from the Wianamatta Shale of the Cumberland Plain.

The Basin adjoins Gulguer Nature Reserve to the south. Two small creeks exist in the area. Large parts of the reserve are prone to flood. During flood events the basin is either fully closed or partially closed to all water-based activity because of hazardous conditions.

== Wildlife ==
Animals species within the area include the Common bent-wing bat, sooty owl, Common wombat, East-coast free-tailed bat, powerful owl, large-eared pied bat and the glossy black cockatoo. The basin harbours 25 plant communities and around 360 plant species. Hibbertia hermanniifolia and Eucalyptus benthamii are both rare tree species present in the park.

Other plant species include, Angophora subvelutina, Eucalyptus pilularis, Eucalyptus eugenioides, Acacia parramattensis, Backhousia myrtifolia, Pratia purpurascens. Asplenium flabellifolium, Adiantum aethiopicum, Oplismenus imbecillis, Cynodon dactylon, Tristaniopsis laurina, Casuarina cunninghamiana, Microlaena stipoides, Syncarpia glomulifera, Glochidion ferdinandi and Ceratopetalum apetalum.

== Features ==
The park is popular for swimming, kayaking, bushwalking, camping (with 100 tent sites), barbecuing, picnicking and fishing. The park also features walking trails within a bushland and an education centre with a commercial kitchen. Caley's Lookout Track, a walking track within the bushland, leads to Little Mountain, a scenic lookout area that is 160 metres (525 feet) in elevation. Designated facilities can be hired for personal use. Two roads access the park (Bents Basin Road in northwest and Bents Loop Road in the park's east), though only the eastern approach permits access to the camping grounds and education centre. A fee is charged for vehicle access per day.

== Drownings ==
The basin is renowned for its dangerous and powerful undercurrents, which have been known to suck swimmers down to the bottom of the 20 metre lagoon, resulting in a number of serious and fatal drownings in recent years.

12/11/2010 - Two men aged 20 and 27 drown while swimming in the Basin.

26/12/2016 - A 25 year old man drowns while swimming with friends in the Basin.

27/01/2019 - Four men aged in their 20s get into trouble while swimming in the Basin, three of the men are rescued with the fourth drowning.

2/02/2025 - A 5 year old boy drowned while swimming in the Basin. He was given CPR and revived by members of the public, before being taken to hospital by air-ambulance in critical condition. He died there shortly thereafter.

== Gallery ==
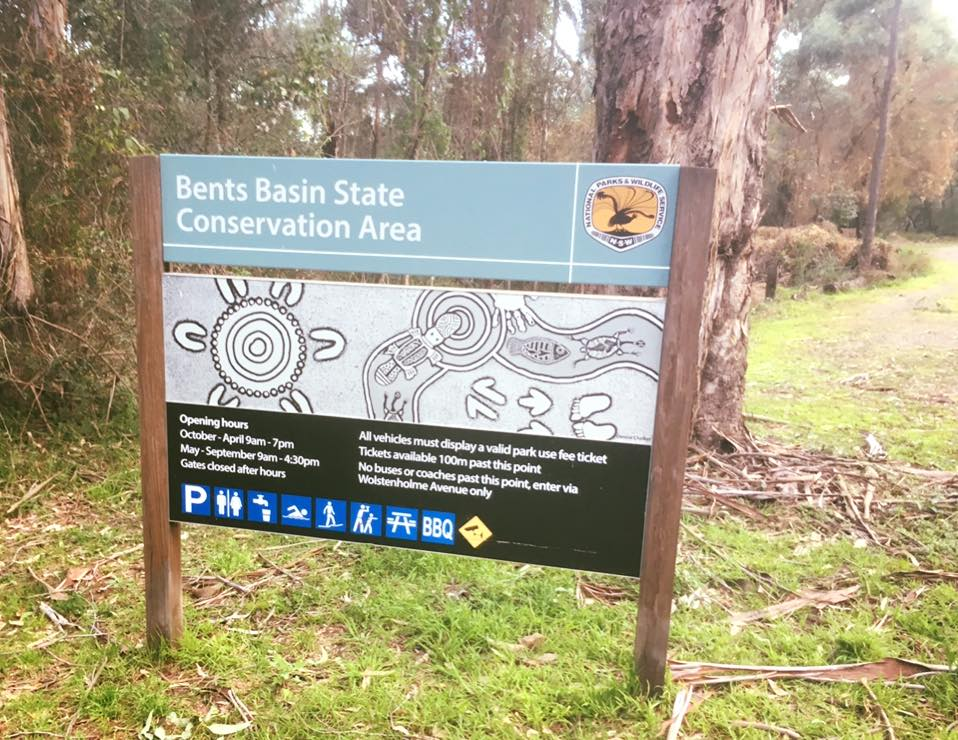
Entrance sign

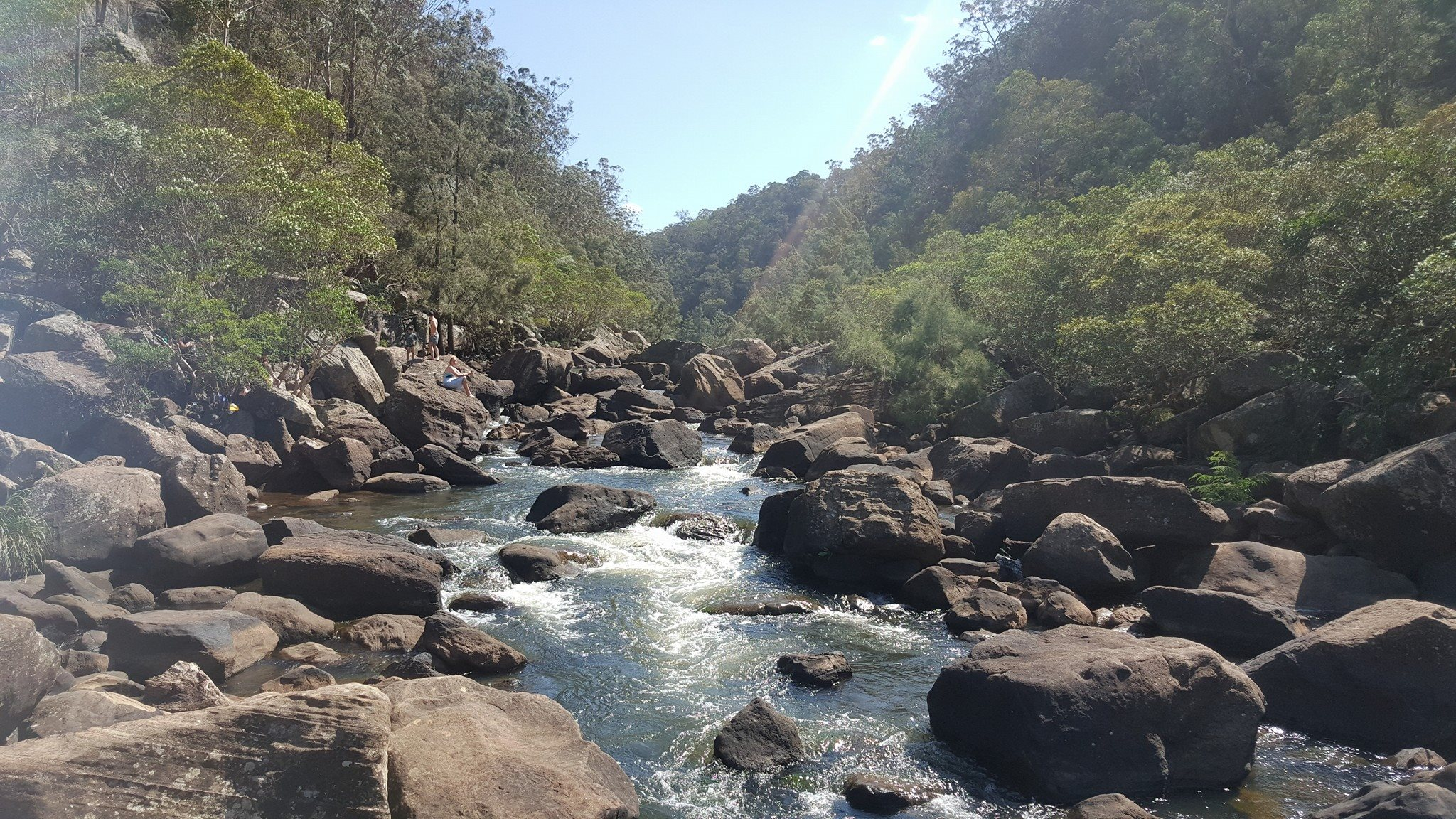
The rocky rapids of Nepean River flowing into the Basin (south side)

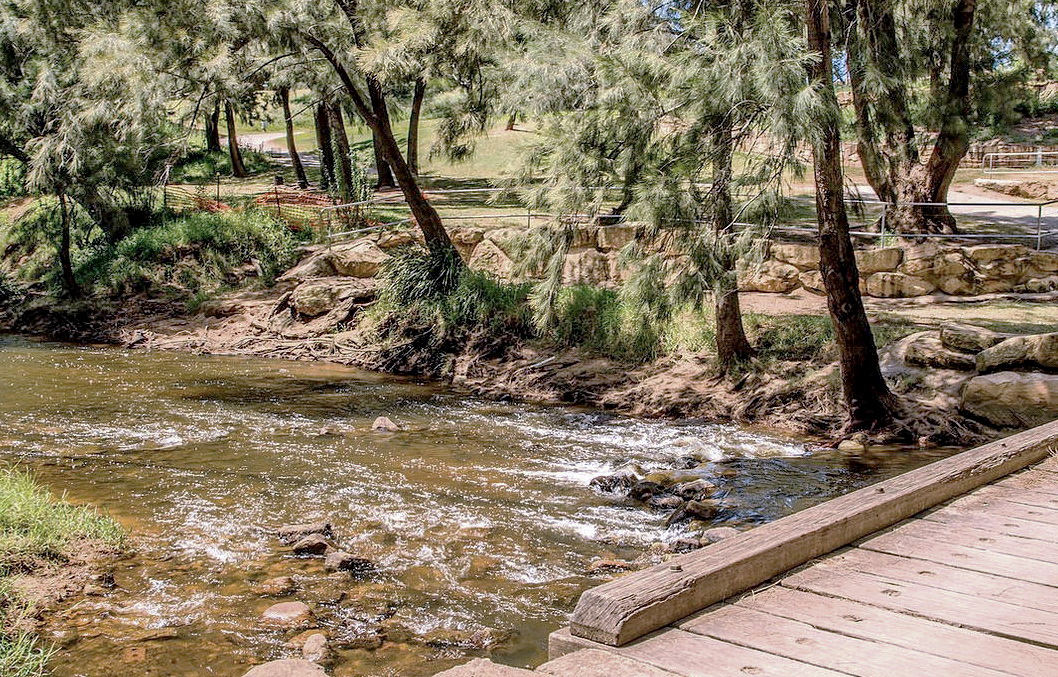
Nepean River streaming out of the Basin, going northwards (east side)

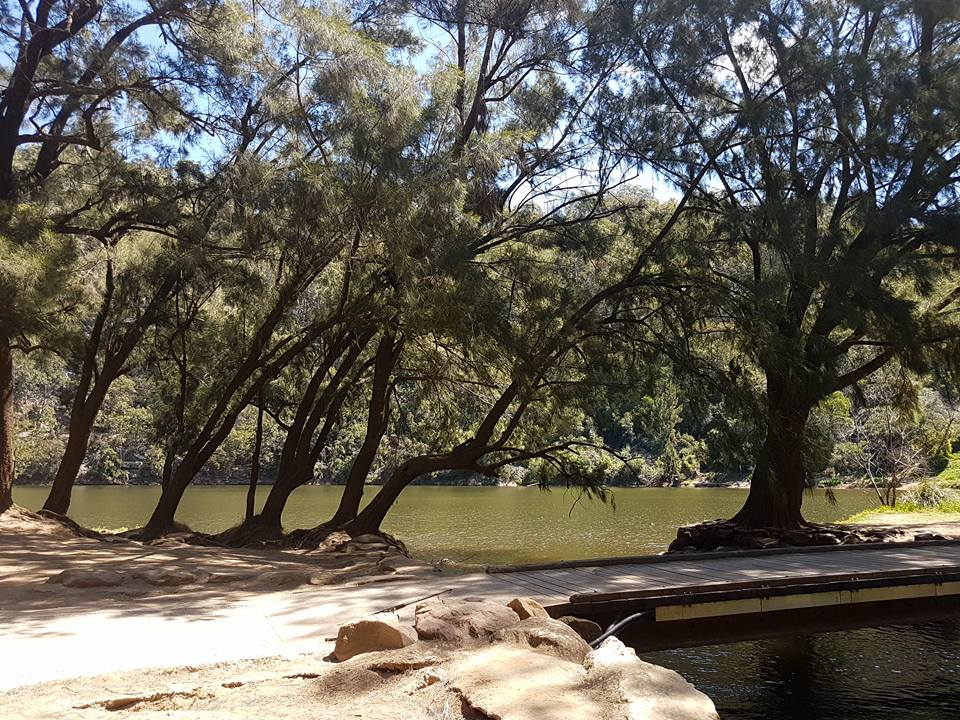
The boardwalk with basin in background

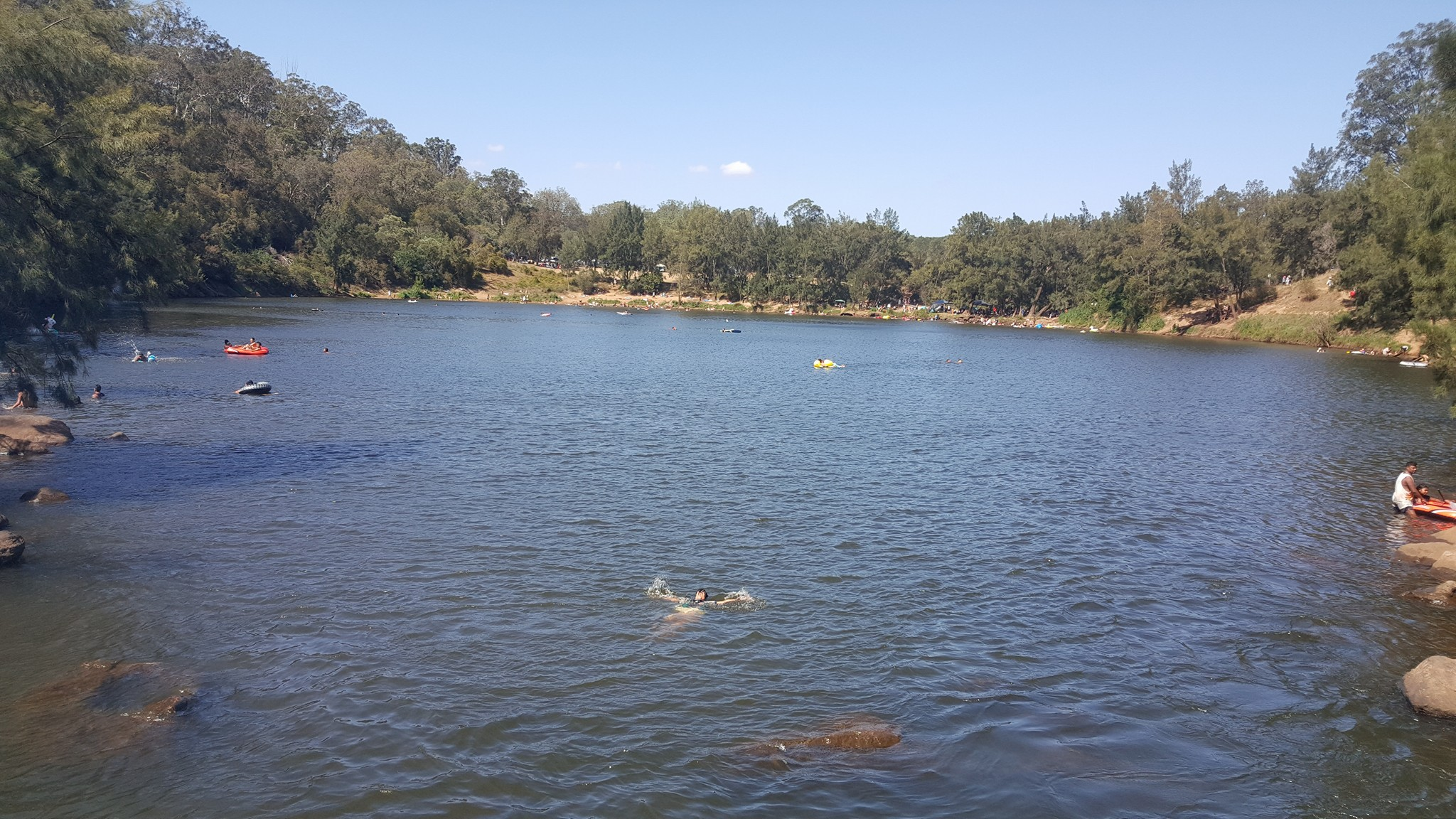
View from Nepean River's rocky bed, which produces northerly currents (south side)

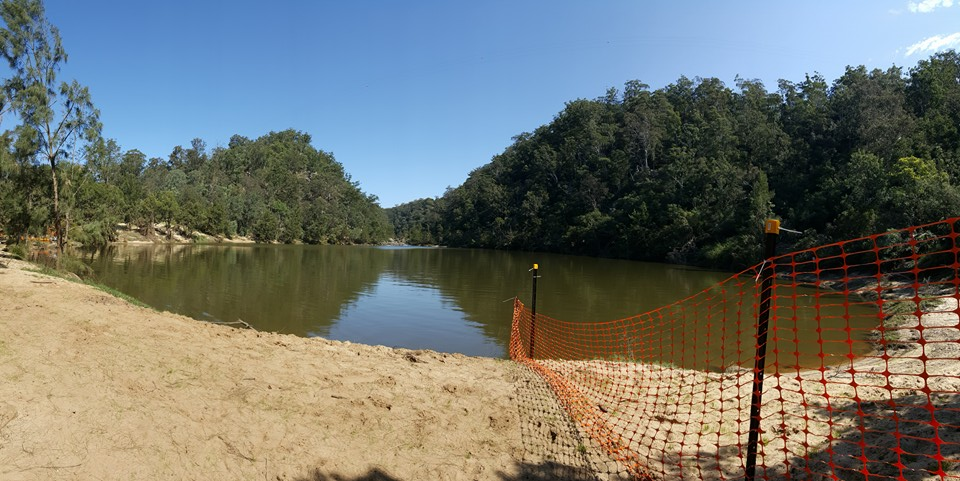
The swimming hole after a flood

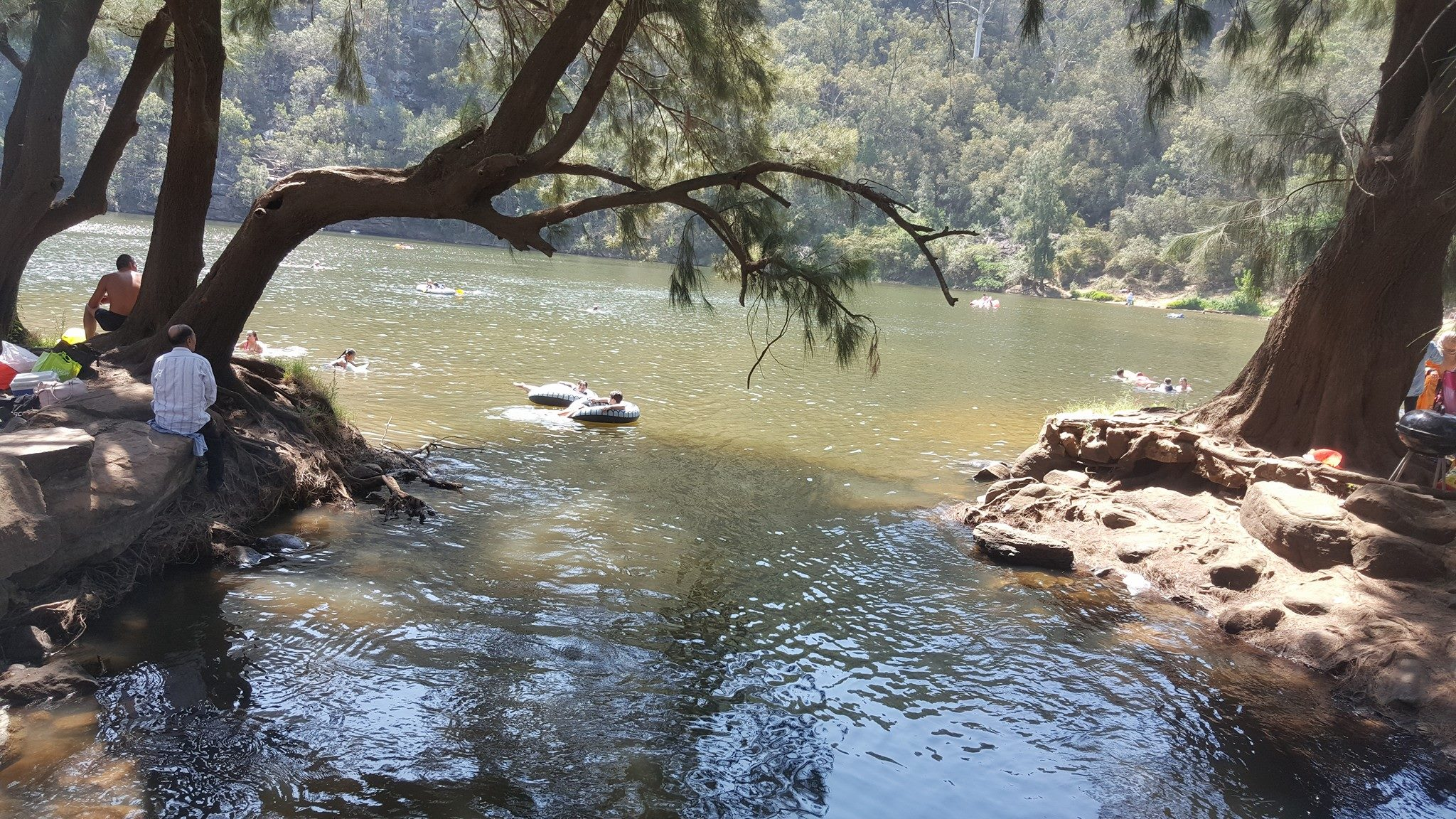
Looking from Nepean River boardwalk (east side)

== See also ==
- Lake Parramatta
- Chipping Norton Lake
