= Hovea magnibractea =

Scientific classification
- Kingdom: Plantae
- Clade: Tracheophytes
- Clade: Angiosperms
- Clade: Eudicots
- Clade: Rosids
- Order: Fabales
- Family: Fabaceae
- Subfamily: Faboideae
- Genus: Hovea
- Species: H. magnibractea

Binomial name
- Hovea magnibractea I.Thomps.

Species of legume

Hovea magnibractea, is a species of flowering plant in the family Fabaceae and is endemic to south-eastern Australia. It is a shrub with narrowly oblong to lorate (strap-shaped) leaves, and mauve and yellow, pea-like flowers.

== Description ==
Hovea magnibractea is a shrub that typically grows to a height of up to 2.5 m (8 ft 2 in), its branchlets densely covered with short brown hairs. The leaves are oblong to linear, lance-shaped or strap-shaped, 30–80 mm (1.2–3.1 in) long and 4–9 mm (0.16–0.35 in) wide with stipules 1–2 mm (0.039–0.079 in) long at the base. The flowers are often arranged in groups of two, each flower on a pedicel 1–2 mm (0.039–0.079 in) long. The flowers have egg-shaped bracts 3–5 mm (0.12–0.20 in) long and similar bracteoles at the base. The sepals are 4.5–7 mm (0.18–0.28 in) long and joined at the base, forming a tube 2.5–3.5 mm (0.098–0.138 in) long, the upper lip about 3.5 mm (0.14 in) wide. The petals are mauve, the standard petal 7.5–10 mm (0.30–0.39 in) long with a yellow base, the wings 2.0–3.6 mm (0.079–0.142 in) wide and the keel shorter than the wings. Flowering occurs from September to December and the fruit is a sessile pod.

== Taxonomy and naming ==
Hovea magnibractea was first formally described in 2001 by Ian R. Thompson in Australian Systematic Botany from specimens collected by James Henderson Ross near the summit of Mount Elizabeth in 1986.

== Distribution and habitat ==
This species of pea grows on steep, rocky slopes and near scree slopes in montane forest, and is restricted to a few mountains in eastern Victoria. There are also old records from Tasmania.
