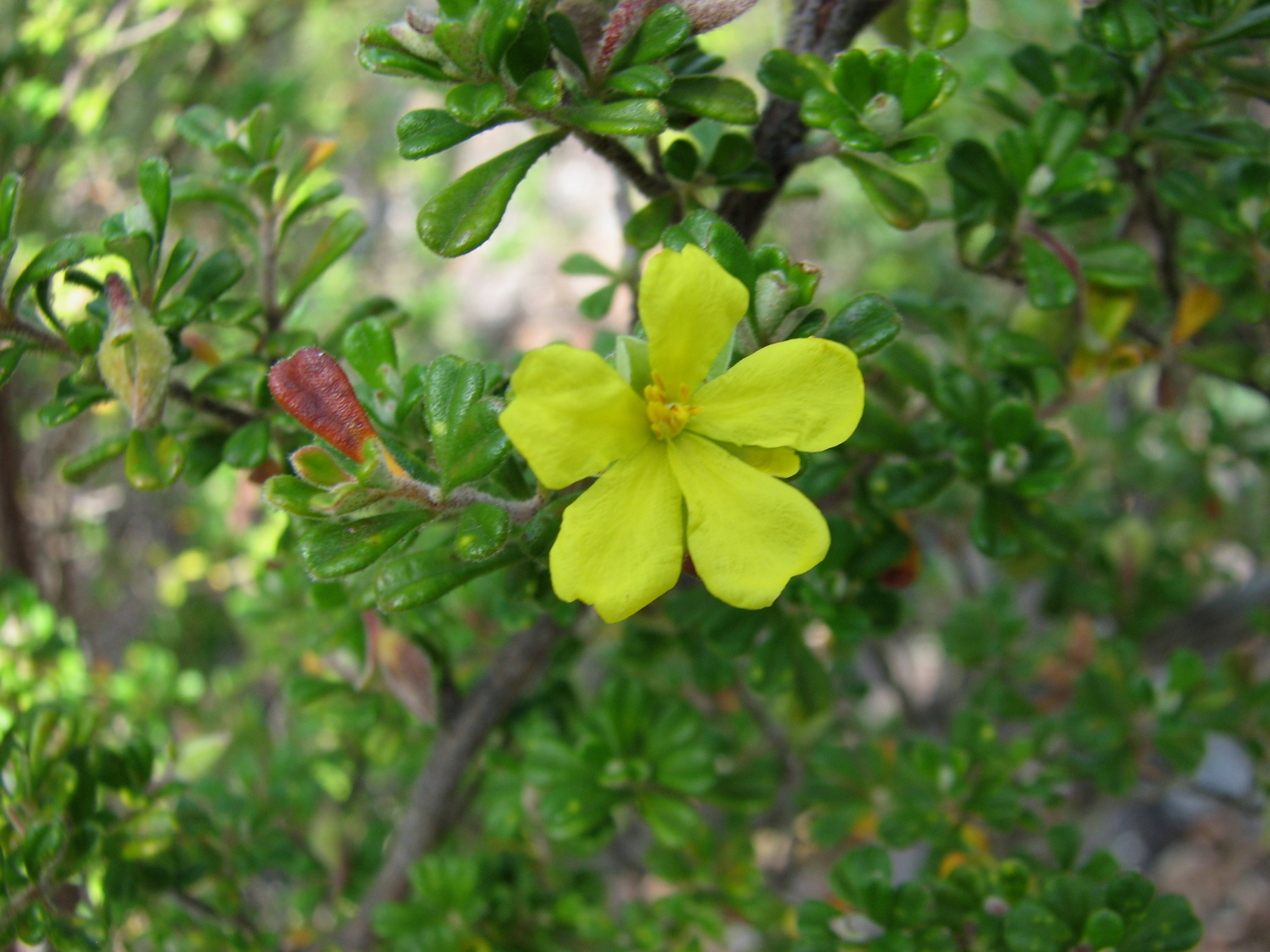
- Subspecies recondita in flower at Mount Elizabeth

Scientific classification
- Kingdom: Plantae
- Clade: Tracheophytes
- Clade: Angiosperms
- Clade: Eudicots
- Order: Dilleniales
- Family: Dilleniaceae
- Genus: Hibbertia
- Species: H. hermanniifolia

Binomial name
- Hibbertia hermanniifolia DC.

= Hibbertia hermanniifolia =

Species of flowering plant

Hibbertia hermanniifolia is a species of flowering plant in the family Dilleniaceae and is endemic to eastern Australia. It is an erect shrub with spatula-shaped to wedge-shaped leaves and yellow flowers arranged singly in leaf axils, with ten to fifteen stamens arranged around two hairy carpels.

== Description ==
Hibbertia hermanniifolia is an erect shrub that typically grows to a height of 0.8–1.5 m (2 ft 7 in – 4 ft 11 in), its branches covered with white to rust-coloured, star-shaped hairs. The leaves are spatula-shaped to wedge-shaped, 5–30 mm (0.20–1.18 in) long and 3–10 mm (0.12–0.39 in) wide, the upper surface greyish with mainly simple hairs and the lower surface whitish to rust-coloured with star-shaped hairs. The flowers are arranged singly in leaf axils and are sessile or on a peduncle 12–16 mm (0.47–0.63 in) long. The sepals are hairy, 6–8 mm (0.24–0.31 in) long and the five petals yellow, 5–7 mm (0.20–0.28 in) long. There are ten to fifteen stamens arranged around the two hairy carpels, each carpel with two or four ovules. Flowering occurs from November to March.

== Taxonomy ==
Hibbertia hermanniifolia was formally described in 1817 by Swiss botanist Augustin Pyramus de Candolle in his Regni Vegetabilis Systema Naturale from specimens collected by George Caley.

In 2012, Hellmut R. Toelken described two subspecies in Journal of the Adelaide Botanic Gardens and the names are accepted by the Australian Plant Census:

- Hibbertia hermanniifolia DC. subsp. hermanniifolia has flowers with peduncles 10–15 mm (0.39–0.59 in) long and a combined number of 18 to 28 stamens and staminodes;
- Hibbertia hermanniifolia subsp. recondita Toelken has flowers with peduncles 3–7 mm (0.12–0.28 in) long and a combined number of up to 15 stamens and staminodes.

== Distribution and habitat ==
This hibbertia grows in forest on sandstone near Bents Basin, in the Yarrowitch area and south from the Wadbilliga National Park in New South Wales and on the rocky summits of mountains in north-eastern Victoria. Subspecies recondita only occurs in north-eastern Victoria.

== See also ==
- List of Hibbertia species
