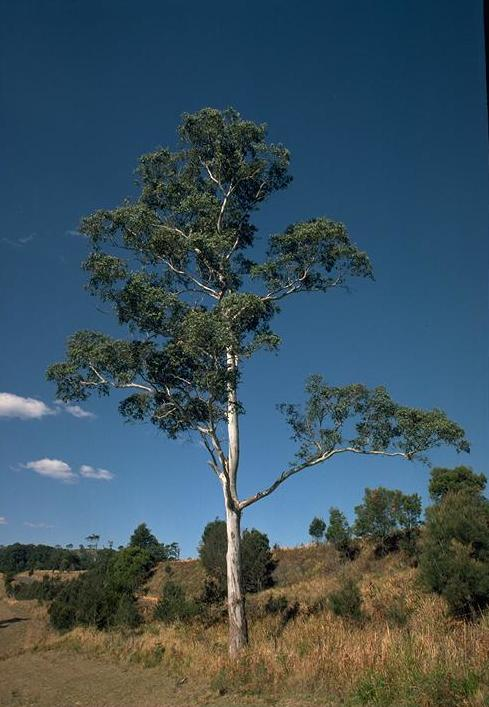
- Near Dorrigo

Conservation status
- Least Concern (IUCN 3.1)

Scientific classification
- Kingdom: Plantae
- Clade: Tracheophytes
- Clade: Angiosperms
- Clade: Eudicots
- Clade: Rosids
- Order: Myrtales
- Family: Myrtaceae
- Genus: Eucalyptus
- Species: E. dorrigoensis

Binomial name
- Eucalyptus dorrigoensis (Blakely) L.A.S.Johnson & K.D.Hill

Synonyms
- Eucalyptus benthamii var. dorrigoensis Blakely; Eucalyptus benthami var. dorrigoensis Blakely orth. var.

= Eucalyptus dorrigoensis =

Dorrigo white-gum

Species of eucalyptus

Eucalyptus dorrigoensis, commonly known as the Dorrigo white gum, is a species of tree that is endemic to New South Wales. It has smooth white, grey or pink bark, lance-shaped to curved adult leaves, flower buds in groups of seven, white flowers and cup-shaped, conical or hemispherical fruit.

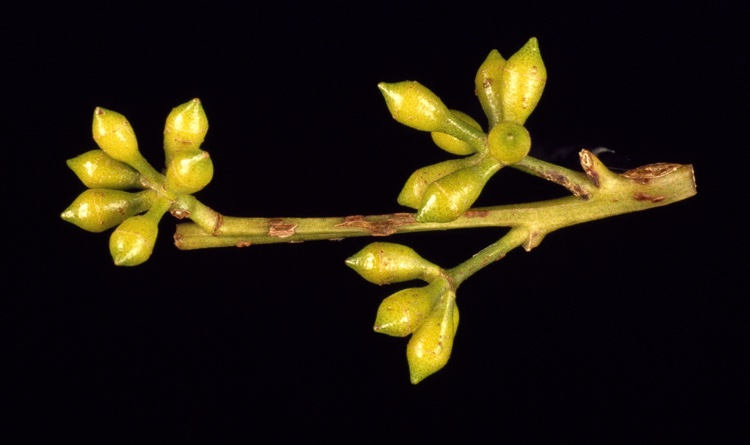
Flower buds

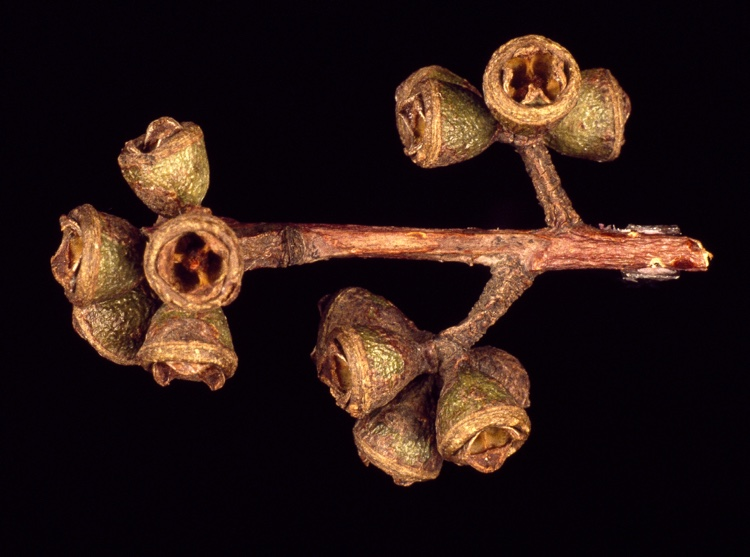
Fruit

== Description ==
Eucalyptus dorrigoensis is a tree that typically grows to a height of 30 m (98 ft) and forms a lignotuber. It has smooth, slightly powdery white, grey or pink bark, sometimes with slabs of rough bark near the base. Young plants and coppice regrowth have warty stems, the leaves arranged in opposite pairs and egg-shaped to broadly lance-shaped, 35–80 mm (1.4–3.1 in) long and 13–40 mm (0.51–1.57 in) wide. Adult leaves are the same colour on both sides, lance-shaped to curved, 60–220 mm (2.4–8.7 in) long and 12–27 mm (0.47–1.06 in) wide on a petiole 5–25 mm (0.20–0.98 in) long. The flower buds are arranged in groups of seven in leaf axils on an unbranched peduncle 4–10 mm (0.16–0.39 in) long, the individual buds on a pedicel 1–3 mm (0.039–0.118 in) long. Mature buds are oval, 4–5 mm (0.16–0.20 in) long and 2–3 mm (0.079–0.118 in) wide with a conical operculum. Flowering occurs in May and the flowers are white. The fruit is a woody conical or hemispherical capsule 3–4 mm (0.12–0.16 in) long and 4–5 mm (0.16–0.20 in) wide with the valves extended beyond the rim.

== Taxonomy and naming ==
Dorrigo white gum was first formally described in 1934 by William Blakely in his book A Key to Eucalypts and given the name Eucalyptus benthamii var. dorrigoensis. In 1990, Lawrie Johnson and Ken Hill raised the variety to species status as Eucalyptus dorrigoensis. The specific epithet (dorrigoensis) is a reference to the distribution of this species near Dorrigo - the ending -ensis is a Latin suffix "denoting place, locality [or] country".

== Distribution and habitat ==
Eucalyptus dorrigoensis grows in deep soils in valley forests from near the upper Macleay River to east of Tenterfield and mainly near Dorrigo.

== See also ==
- List of Eucalyptus species
