= Mount Elizabeth (Victoria) =

Mountain in Victoria, Australia

- Location within Victoria

Highest point
- Elevation: 941 metres (3,087 ft) AHD
- Coordinates: 37°29′5″S 147°55′13″E

Geography
- Location: Victoria, Australia
- Parent range: Great Dividing Range

Mount Elizabeth is a mountain to the east of Tambo Crossing in East Gippsland, Victoria, Australia. It lies within the Mount Elizabeth Nature Conservation Reserve managed by Parks Victoria. The reserve, which covers 5,234 hectares (12,934 acres), was established in 1984. The reserve is the only known location where the endangered plant species leafy nematolepis (Nematolepis frondosa) occurs. Other rare or vulnerable plant species found in the reserve include Tullach Ard grevillea (Grevillea polychroma), outcrop guinea-flower (Hibbertia hermanniifolia subsp. recondita), Mount Elizabeth hovea (Hovea magnibractea), monkey mint-bush (Prostanthera walteri) and leafless pink-bells (Tetratheca subaphylla). Fauna species of note include the lace monitor, yellow-tailed black cockatoo and gang-gang cockatoo.

A sawmill was established by the Collins Brothers which was reported to be at full capacity in 1937. The harvested timbers included messmate (Eucalyptus obliqua) and ash. Previously an access road had been created and a sawmill established on the river by the Gippsland Timber Company, however its output was minimal.

== Named peaks ==
- Mount Elizabeth No. 1 37°29′5″S 147°55′13″E
- Mount Elizabeth No. 2 37°29′21″S 147°55′51″E

== See also ==
- List of mountains in Australia § Victoria
- Protected areas of Victoria
