= John Blaxland (explorer) =

Australian politician

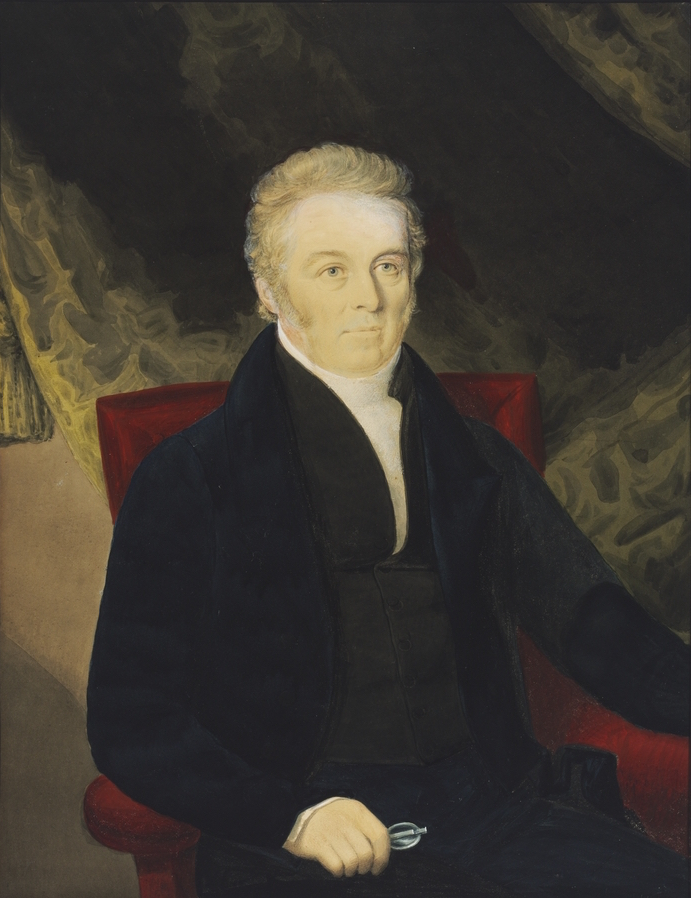
- 1832 portrait of John Blaxland by Richard Read
- Born: 4 January 1769
- Died: 5 August 1845 (aged 76)

John Blaxland (4 January 1769 – 5 August 1845) was a pioneer settler and explorer in Australia.

== Early life ==
Blaxland was born in Kent, the eldest son of gentleman farmer John Blaxland and Mary, née Parker, of Fordwich, Kent, England. He was the older brother of early Australian explorer Gregory Blaxland. His father died when he was eleven and the family moved to Canterbury where he and his brother were educated at The King's School. In 1787 he joined the army and rose to become a captain. He resigned his commission in 1792 and returned to manage the family estates at Newington, Kent. He was married twice: to Sarah Davies from 1794 until her death in childbirth in 1795, and to Harriet, daughter of Jean Louis de Marquett (a merchant of Calcutta and a former guard of Louis XVI), from 1797 until his death in 1845. He and Harriet had four sons and six daughters.

== Australia ==
In 1805 John and his younger brother Gregory were persuaded by Joseph Banks to emigrate to Australia.

Gregory was the first to sail to New South Wales while John remained to sell the family estate in Kent. John reached Sydney on 4 April 1807, having, in conjunction with Hulletts brothers, of London, built The Three Brothers, a ship of 252 tons, carrying eight guns and a crew of 21 to bring himself, his wife, and four daughters, a governess, two female servants, a bailiff, a carpenter, a man for agricultural purposes and a boy to this land, Oliver Russell being the master.

== Newington House ==
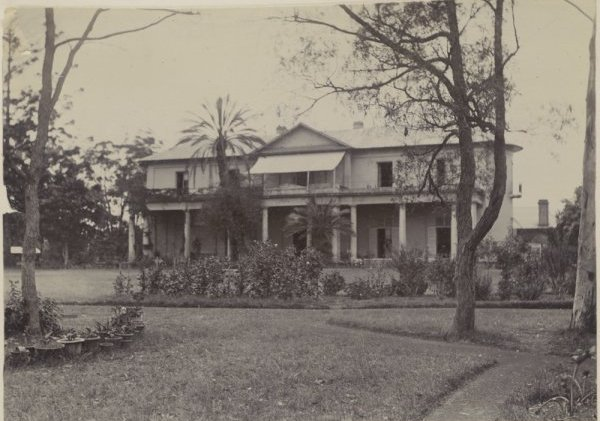
Newington House, Silverwater, c.1894

Within ten days of the First Fleet arriving in Australia, records had been made of "The Flats", the extensive tidal wetlands at Homebush Bay. Between the years 1788 and 1831, blocks of land ranging from 100 to 10,000 acres (40 km²) were given out to the first European settlers by dividing up the Wanng-al clans' land. These land grants were inked in on County of Cumberland maps, with names of owners and land granted clearly indicated. In 1807, John Blaxland acquired 520 hectares of land, reserving the original grants of Waterhouse, Shortland, Archer and Haslam. He named the estate Newington after his family estate in Kent, England. Blaxland established a series of salt pans on the banks of the Parramatta River and by 1827, was producing 8 tons of salt each week for the Sydney market. Blaxland also established a tweed mill, limekiln and flourmill. In 1843, Blaxland mortgaged the property to the Australian Trust Company. After he died in 1851 the Trust Company sold the property to John Dobie to recover the mortgage. The Blaxland family re-purchased the estate from Dobie in 1854 but offered it as security against a large loan. The property was transferred to the Official Assignee of the Insolvent Estate of Edward James Blaxland in 1860 and subsequently leased to the Methodist Church, who established Newington College on the estate. The building is now listed on the Register of the National Estate.

== Return to Australia ==
Blaxland returned to Sydney on 27 February 1818, on board the Laurel. With him was Mak Sai Ying, the first known Chinese man to settle in Australia. Mak Sai Ying was later to negotiate land deals favourable to Blaxland, while working as a carpenter, until 1821.

However, in the 1820s, under Governor Brisbane, Blaxland obtained good land in the Nepean (800 acres called "Grove Farm" where he had built a weir and brewery where barley and English soft wheat were grown at what became Wallacia) and Hunter Regions as a result of discovering a route to the area. His grant was in the area now known as Broke and by 1830 he had established a mill in the nearby area of Fordwich.

== Family and descendants ==
Blaxland married twice, firstly to Sarah Davies (who died during childbirth) and secondly to Harriott de Marquett, daughter of Jean Louis de Marquett (a Calcutta merchant and a bodyguard of Louis XVI). He was survived by several sons and daughters from his second marriage. His younger brother, Gregory Blaxland of Blue Mountains crossing fame committed suicide a few years after his death.

Their eldest daughter Harriott firstly married Calcutta merchant Alexander Macdonald Ritchie with whom she bore three children: Elizabeth, Arthur and Alexander. Through her family connections (both maternal and spousal) Harriott spent some time in India and wrote an account of a sati or widow-burning, the account is now in the Library of New South Wales.

Harriott and Alexander's daughter, Elizabeth, married (Note: An account of Elizabeth's wedding is also held in the Library of New South Wales) a Welshman, Charles Boydell, who was a pioneer in the Hunter Valley, in particular, Gresford, New South Wales where he had a property called Camyr Allyn. Charles' brother William married the daughter of the first Anglican Archbishop of Australia, William Broughton, also an alumnus of the King's School, Canterbury. From Elizabeth's line, descendants married into families such as the wine-making Lindemans. From Arthur's line, descendants married into the British nobility. (Note: Lady Dowling returned to England and died there in 1881. Arthur's daughter Helen married into the Hubbard nobility.)

Harriott, as Mrs Ritchie, was the subject of a romantic tryst with French navigator Hyacinthe de Bougainville. (Note: As mentioned in Colin Dyer's book, The French Explorers in Sydney (2009, UQP)) In de Bougainville's account, the navigator was pleasantly surprised to find an Anglo-French speaking family in the colony, connections to Louis XVI and praised Blaxland as a truly English gentleman.

After Alexander Ritchie's death, eldest Harriott married the second Chief Justice of NSW, fellow widower Sir James Dowling, thereafter becoming Lady Dowling. Furthermore, Lady Dowling's father, who was known as a liberal, made Sir James pointed out the difficulties of advancement in the colony for having so close a connection to a "Kentish whig":

Dowling recognised that his recent remarriage to Harriott Ritchie, a widow, ("the daughter of a most respectable man and worthy gentleman...and an honest upright man...who has the misfortune to be a Kentish whig"), might weigh against him.

Their second daughter, Anne, married Thomas Walker who had considerable holdings in the area now known as Rhodes.

Their eldest son, John de Marquet, who died young and unmarried, was an early explorer and cattle drover who found a passage from Sydney to Cessnock where his family were granted land holdings. Blaxland Arm near the town of Laguna, New South Wales is named after him. (Note: In particular, land holdings granted to the three Ritchie children: Elizabeth, Arthur and Alexander near Broke.)

Eliza Maria, his fifth daughter married Henry William Breton on 3 November 1832.

Their youngest daughter, Louisa Australia (so named as she was the first of the Blaxland children born in Australia), lobbied the State Government and Sir Henry Parkes to keep the family estate intact and preserved to no avail.

The family's (with the Walker's) extensive documents are held in the archives of the State Library of New South Wales.

== See also ==
- Political families of Australia
- Blaxland Crossing Reserve, a parkland named after Blaxland

== Bibliography ==
- Dyer, C.(2009) The French Explorers in Sydney, Santa Lucia: University of Queensland Press.
- Irving, T H (1966). "Blaxland, John (1769 - 1845)". Australian Dictionary of Biography. National Centre of Biography, Australian National University. pp. 117–118. ISBN 978-0-522-84459-7. ISSN 1833-7538. OCLC 70677943.
- Serle, Percival (1949). "Blaxland, John". Dictionary of Australian Biography. Sydney: Angus & Robertson.
- "THE BIOGRAPHER". The Sydney Mail and New South Wales Advertiser. Vol. XXXVI, no. 1216. New South Wales, Australia. 27 October 1883. p. 775 – via Trove.

New South Wales Legislative Council
Unknown	Appointed Member; 30 Jan 1829 – 1 Sep 1844	Succeeded by George Allen
