= African Lion Safari (Warragamba) =

Closed wildlife park in Australia

- Interactive map of African Lion Safari
- 33.8994868°S 150.6026459°E
- Date opened: 1968
- Date closed: 1991
- Location: Warragamba, New South Wales, Australia
- Annual visitors: 200,000

The African Lion Safari was a wildlife park that opened on 17 August 1968. It operated near Warragamba on the outskirts of Sydney in New South Wales, Australia until 1991.

There was also a dolphinarium in the African Lion Safari.

== History ==
African Lion Safari was opened by Stafford Bullen (1925–2001) in 1968. At the time, Bullen was still operating a travelling circus, in 1969 he opened a second venture in neighbouring wallacia Bullen's Animal World. For the opening, a promotional single of The Tokens' "The Lion Sleeps Tonight" was recorded by a band using the name "The Love Machine" (the band turned out to be Tymepiece). The safari was popular in its early years and attracted up to 200,000 visitors each year.

With the suburbs encroaching on the facility, and extensive work required to upgrade the park following legislative changes, it eventually closed in 1991 but continued to hold animals on site that were used in a circus but not displayed to the public.

African Lion Safari originally opened in Warragamba, where it had a drive through area full of wild animals i.e. lions, tigers and bears.

== Incidents ==
On 7 August 1995, a lioness escaped from the (by then closed to the public for several years) park, roamed the nearby townships of Warragamba and Silverdale, and killed a dog. The lioness responsible for killing the dog was shot by a park employee. As a result of the escape, the park was required to upgrade facilities. A bear also escaped and was shot by residents, as reported by Michael Feeny.
