= Warragamba, New South Wales =

Warragamba
- Town
- Coordinates: 33°53′30″S 150°36′12″E
- Country: Australia
- State: New South Wales
- LGA: Wollondilly Shire
- Location: 69 km (43 mi) W of Sydney

Government
  - State electorate: Wollondilly
  - Federal division: Hume
- Elevation: 178 m (584 ft)

Population
  - Total: 1,241 (2016 census)
- Postcode: 2752
Localities around Warragamba
Megalong Valley	Megalong Valley	Wallacia
Megalong Valley	Warragamba	Wallacia
Silverdale	Silverdale	Silverdale

Warragamba is a town in New South Wales, Australia, in Wollondilly Shire. Located on the eastern edge of the Blue Mountains, Warragamba is one and a half hour's drive west of Sydney. The name Warragamba comes from the aboriginal words Warra and Gamba meaning 'water running over rocks'.

== History ==
In 1804, George William Evans became the first white man to discover the Warragamba River, penetrating upstream to the present site of Warragamba Dam.

However, for Indigenous peoples, the river and the valley were an integral part of daily life, and remain today a significant place of cultural heritage.

Originally constructed as a workers' settlement during the construction of Warragamba Dam, Sydney's primary water source, in the 1940s the modern town of Warragamba remains on the same site adjacent the dam. The town was built from scratch, including homes, shops, schools and other facilities.

On completion of the dam being built many workers bought their homes from the Water Board and stayed on in the township. Warragamba Public School celebrated its fiftieth anniversary in September 1998 despite the fact it was to be demolished after the completion of Warragamba Dam in the 1960s.

Warragamba is unusual for an Australian town, as the streets do not have typical names, but are numbered (such as First Street and Eighteenth Street).

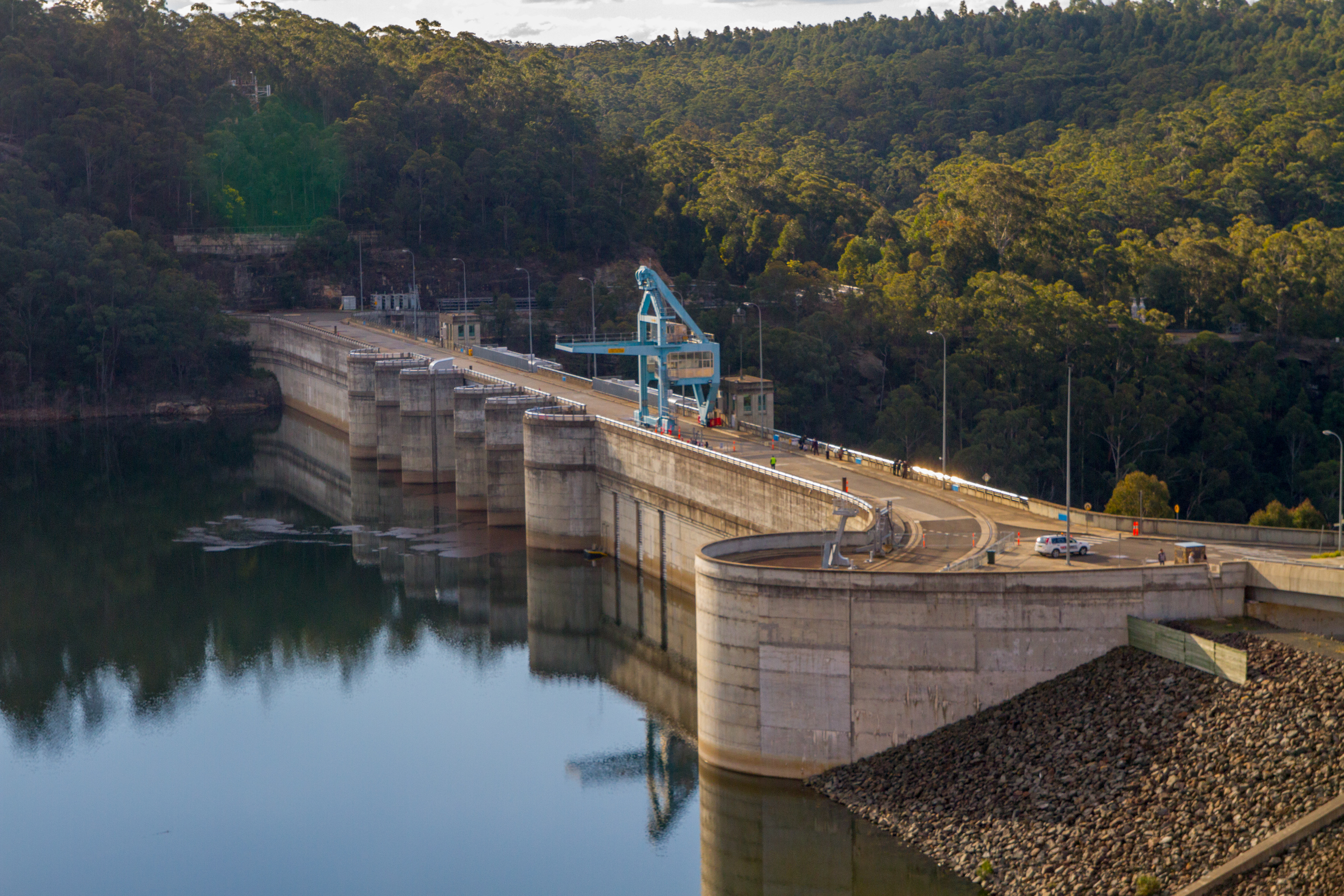
Warragamba Dam in Warragamba

Ongoing dam works (including recent safety improvements) have severely reduced weekend visitors. The town also lost 30 homes and businesses in the 2001 Warragamba bushfires. It was home to African Lion Safari until 1991.

A new Warragamba Dam Visitor Centre and Haviland Park are becoming a popular tourist attractions thanks in part to the excellent picnic facilities.

== Heritage listings ==
Lake Burragorang Warragamba Dam has a number of heritage-listed sites, including:

- Coxs River Arms: Coxs River track
- Warragamba Dam
  - Warragamba Dam: Megarritys Bridge
  - Warragamba Dam: Warragamba Dam – Haviland Park

== Population ==
At the 2016 census, Warragamba had a population of 1,241. 85.4% of people were born in Australia and 92.4% of people only spoke English at home. The most common responses for religion were Catholic 31.8%, Anglican 26.4% and No Religion 25.6%.
