= List of government schools in New South Wales (Q–S) =

Prior to 1848, most schools in New South Wales were operated by churches or private organisations, with some financial support from the government under the Denominational School Board, which was established in 1836. In January 1848, the Board of National Education began establishing government schools to develop a public education system, with the enactment and royal assent (16 August 1848) of the National Education Board Act 1848 (NSW). The first public school, Kempsey National School, opened that year, and by 1851, more than 37 public schools were in operation in New South Wales. As of 2025, the New South Wales Department of Education, a department of the Government of New South Wales, administers more than 2,200 public schools, both primary and secondary schools, across that state, that are in these lists:

== Q ==
Name	Suburb/Town	Region	Opened	Coordinates	Ref
Quaama Public School	Quaama	South Coast	1877	36°27′52.36″S 149°52′5.71″E	
Quakers Hill East Public School	Acacia Gardens	North West	1959	33°43′57.66″S 150°54′48.9″E	
Quakers Hill High School	Quakers Hill	Greater West	1993	33°43′45.86″S 150°53′47.61″E	
Quakers Hill Public School	Quakers Hill	Greater West	1912	33°44′15.39″S 150°53′7.01″E	
Quambone Public School	Quambone	Orana	1898	30°55′52.03″S 147°52′17.87″E	
Quandialla Public School	Quandialla	Central West	1913	34°0′37.7″S 147°47′29.44″E	
Queanbeyan East Public School	Queanbeyan East	Southern Tablelands	1967	35°20′41.48″S 149°14′45.61″E	
Queanbeyan High School	Queanbeyan	Southern Tablelands	1958	35°21′11.47″S 149°13′19.44″E	
Queanbeyan Public School	Queanbeyan	Southern Tablelands	1864	35°21′24.79″S 149°14′11.84″E	
Queanbeyan South Public School	Karabar	Southern Tablelands	1969	35°21′54.29″S 149°13′45.08″E	
Queanbeyan West Public School	Queanbeyan West	Southern Tablelands	1958	35°20′52.78″S 149°12′59.38″E	
Quirindi High School	Quirindi	North West Slopes	1954	31°30′5.21″S 150°40′45.67″E	
Quirindi Public School	Quirindi	North West Slopes	1877	31°29′53.29″S 150°40′43.31″E	

== R ==
Name	Suburb/Town	Region	Opened	Coordinates	Ref
Raglan Public School	Raglan	Central West	1870	33°25′29.63″S 149°39′6.91″E	
Railway Town Public School	Broken Hill	Far West	1914	31°58′14.41″S 141°26′23.89″E	
Rainbow Street Public School	Randwick	Eastern Sydney	1923	33°55′30.44″S 151°14′13.43″E	
Raleigh Public School	Raleigh	Mid North Coast	1887	30°27′0.11″S 153°0′44.38″E	
Ramsgate Public School	Ramsgate Beach	Southern Sydney	1929	33°58′53.33″S 151°8′37.97″E	
Rand Public School	Rand	Riverina	1926	35°35′44.24″S 146°34′47.23″E	
Randwick Boys High School	Randwick	Eastern Sydney	1944	33°55′24.95″S 151°14′20.37″E	
Randwick Girls' High School	Randwick	Eastern Sydney	1959	33°55′18.95″S 151°14′23.83″E	
Randwick Public School	Randwick	Eastern Sydney	1883	33°54′37″S 151°14′33.37″E	
Rankins Springs Public School	Rankins Springs	Riverina	1926	33°50′24.29″S 146°15′29.78″E	
Rappville Public School	Rappville	Northern Rivers	1908	29°5′11.73″S 152°57′19.26″E	
Rathmines Public School	Rathmines	Hunter	1941	33°2′35.47″S 151°35′23.78″E	
Raymond Terrace Public School	Raymond Terrace	Hunter	1858	32°45′58.51″S 151°44′26.16″E	
Red Hill Environmental Education Centre	Gulgong	Central West	1995	32°21′52.73″S 149°32′10.3″E	
Red Hill Public School	Wagga Wagga	Riverina	1970	35°8′46.84″S 147°20′51.75″E	
Red Range Public School	Red Range	Northern Tablelands	1879	29°46′33.92″S 151°53′45.1″E	
Redbank School	Westmead	Greater West	1976	33°48′4″S 150°59′14″E	
Redhead Public School	Redhead	Hunter	1908	33°0′41.96″S 151°42′40.73″E	
Regents Park Public School	Regents Park	Greater Western Sydney	1899	33°53′6.53″S 151°1′25.66″E	
Regentville Public School	Regentville	Greater West	1868	33°46′37.6″S 150°40′4.9″E	
Repton Public School	Repton	Northern Rivers	1915	30°26′46.63″S 153°1′43.66″E	
Revesby Public School	Revesby	South West	1896	33°56′40.45″S 151°0′59.35″E	
Revesby South Public School	Revesby	South West	1954	33°57′37.96″S 151°1′0.34″E	
Richmond High School	Richmond	Greater West	1955	33°36′1.57″S 150°44′51.14″E	
Richmond North Public School	North Richmond	Greater West	1871	33°34′51.73″S 150°43′1.81″E	
Richmond Public School	Richmond	Greater West	1860	33°35′56.67″S 150°45′29.15″E	
Rivers Secondary College – Richmond River High School	North Lismore	Northern Rivers	1958	28°49′13.18″S 153°17′55.07″E	
Ringrose Public School	Greystanes	Greater West	1962	33°49′11.38″S 150°57′30.25″E	
Rivendell School	Concord West	Inner West	1972	33°49′56.39″S 151°5′52.59″E	
Riverbank Public School	The Ponds	North West	2015	33°42′13.38″S 150°53′55.67″E	
Riverina Environmental Education Centre	Wagga Wagga	Riverina	1989	35°7′46.01″S 147°18′35.11″E	
Riverside Girls High School	Huntleys Point	Northern Suburbs	1959	33°50′23.02″S 151°8′25.25″E	
Riverstone High School	Riverstone	Greater West	1962	33°40′47.66″S 150°52′31.85″E	
Riverstone Public School	Riverstone	Greater West	1883	33°40′38.51″S 150°52′13.66″E	
Riverwood Public School	Riverwood	South West	1948	33°56′49.72″S 151°2′50.54″E	
Robert Townson High School	Raby	South West	1987	34°0′55.16″S 150°49′5.32″E	
Robert Townson Public School	Raby	South West	1982	34°0′58.48″S 150°49′10.04″E	
Robertson Public School	Robertson	Southern Highlands	1872	34°35′21.57″S 150°35′31.42″E	
Rockdale Public School	Rockdale	Southern Sydney	1883	33°57′6.99″S 151°8′31.35″E	
Rockley Public School	Rockley	Central Tablelands	1860	33°41′33.64″S 149°33′47.08″E	
Rocky River Public School	Rocky River	Northern Tablelands	1861	30°36′47.62″S 151°29′30.41″E	
Rollands Plains Upper Public School	Upper Rollands Plains	Mid North Coast	1937	31°14′21.53″S 152°37′54.42″E	
Rooty Hill High School	Rooty Hill	Greater West	1962	33°46′17.09″S 150°50′16.87″E	
Rooty Hill Public School	Rooty Hill	Greater West	1957	33°46′9.52″S 150°50′25.87″E	
Rose Bay Public School	Rose Bay	Eastern Sydney	1891	33°52′10″S 151°7′16″E	
Rose Bay Secondary College	Dover Heights	Eastern Sydney	1982	33°52′42.67″S 151°16′37.9″E	
Rosebank Public School	Rosebank	Northern Rivers	1891	33°52′13.18″S 151°7′17.05″E	
Rosehill Public School	Rosehill	Greater West	1886	33°49′26.46″S 151°1′8.24″E	
Roselea Public School	Carlingford	North West	1965	33°45′54.91″S 151°3′9.85″E	
Rosemeadow Public School	Rosemeadow	Macarthur	1986	34°6′16.42″S 150°47′40.24″E	
Roseville Public School	Roseville	Northern Sydney	1913	33°46′56.52″S 151°11′18.23″E	
Rosewood Public School	Rosewood	Riverina	1883	35°40′12.03″S 147°51′39.87″E	
Ross Hill Public School	Inverell	New England	1894	29°46′16.7″S 151°6′11.26″E	
Rossmore Public School	Rossmore	South-West	1902	33°56′46.01″S 150°46′14.47″E	
Rous Public School	Rous	Northern Rivers	1881	28°52′16.02″S 153°24′26.81″E	
Rouse Hill High School	Rouse Hill	Greater West	2009	33°47′46″S 150°47′11″E	
Rouse Hill Public School	Rouse Hill	Hills	1875	33°40′44.71″S 150°55′14.62″E	
Rowena Public School	Rowena	Orana	1923	29°48′51.36″S 148°54′43.6″E	
Rowland Hassall School	Chester Hill	Greater West	1955	33°52′3.91″S 150°59′20.71″E	
Royal Far West School	Manly	Northern Beaches	1938	33°47′53.99″S 151°17′18.51″E	
Royal National Park Environmental Education Centre	Royal National Park	Southern Sydney	1978	34°3′50.45″S 151°3′27.29″E	
Royal North Shore Hospital School	St Leonards	Lower North Shore	1923	33°49′17.08″S 151°11′29.48″E	
Royal Prince Alfred Hospital School	Camperdown	Inner City	1924	33°53′21.64″S 151°10′59.4″E	
Rozelle Public School	Rozelle	Inner West	1878	33°51′46.69″S 151°10′12.8″E	
Rukenvale Public School	Rukenvale	Northern Rivers	1930	28°28′4.07″S 152°53′38.43″E	
Rumbalara Environmental Education Centre	Gosford	Central Coast	1991	33°25′40.51″S 151°20′51.56″E	
Ruse Public School	Ruse	Greater West	1978	34°4′1.55″S 150°50′29.88″E	
Russell Lea Public School	Russell Lea	Inner West	1931	33°51′41.86″S 151°8′33.77″E	
Russell Vale Public School	Russell Vale	Illawarra	1954	34°21′33.67″S 150°54′23.02″E	
Rutherford Technology High School	Rutherford	Hunter	1985	32°42′40.15″S 151°31′50.82″E	
Rutherford Public School	Rutherford	Hunter	1985	32°42′40.79″S 151°31′42.37″E	
Rydalmere East Public School	Ermington	Greater West	1955	33°48′59.54″S 151°3′29.1″E	
Rydalmere Public School	Rydalmere	Greater West	1891	33°48′49.74″S 151°2′44.01″E	
Ryde East Public School	North Ryde	Northern Sydney	1961	33°48′23.15″S 151°7′36.83″E	
Ryde Public School	Ryde	Northern Sydney	1868	33°48′41.64″S 151°6′30.29″E	
Ryde Secondary College	Ryde	Northern Sydney	1965	33°48′48.04″S 151°7′6.62″E	
Rye Park Public School	Rye Park	Southern Tablelands	1876	34°31′19.25″S 148°54′22.35″E	
Rylstone Public School	Rylstone	Central Tablelands	1857	32°47′45.94″S 149°58′22.7″E	

== S ==
Name	Suburb/Town	Region	Opened	Coordinates	Ref
Sackville Street Public School	Ingleburn	South West	1977	34°0′39.61″S 150°51′44.98″E	
Sadleir Public School	Sadleir	South West	1963	33°55′0.85″S 150°53′26.87″E	
St Andrews Public School	St Andrews	Macarthur	1978	34°1′20.29″S 150°49′52.54″E	
St Clair High School	St Clair	Greater West	1985	33°47′46.48″S 150°47′11.66″E	
St Clair Public School	St Clair	Greater West	1981	33°47′46″S 150°47′11″E	
St George Girls' High School	Kogarah	St George	1916	33°57′34.44″S 151°8′11.21″E	
St George Hospital School	Kogarah	St George	1943	33°57′59.97″S 151°8′5.3″E	
St George School	Kogarah	St George	1953	33°58′9.51″S 151°8′16.73″E	
St Georges Basin Public School	Basin View	South Coast	1949	35°5′29.57″S 150°33′50.19″E	
St Helens Park Public School	St Helens Park	South West	1994	34°6′37.9″S 150°48′12.13″E	
St Ives High School	St Ives	Upper North Shore	1964	33°44′23.49″S 151°9′59.68″E	
St Ives North Public School	St Ives	Upper North Shore	1961	33°43′7.35″S 151°9′48.83″E	
St Ives Park Public School	St Ives	Upper North Shore	1969	33°43′25.94″S 151°10′43.2″E	
St Ives Public School	St Ives	Upper North Shore	1962	33°44′17.89″S 151°9′57.12″E	
St Johns Park High School	St Johns Park	Greater West	1978	33°52′26.59″S 150°53′25.42″E	
St Johns Park Public School	St Johns Park	Greater West	1891	33°53′13″S 150°53′57.47″E	
St Marys North Public School	North St Marys	Greater West	1960	33°45′21.01″S 150°46′53.63″E	
St Marys Public School	St Marys	Greater West	1861	33°46′10.07″S 150°46′13.77″E	
St Marys Senior High School	St Marys	Greater West	1989	33°45′49.97″S 150°46′14.66″E	
St Marys South Public School	St Marys	Greater West	1961	33°46′49.59″S 150°46′34.39″E	
St Peters Public School	St Peters	Inner West	1881	33°54′46.24″S 151°10′39.89″E	
Salt Ash Public School	Salt Ash	Hunter	1883	32°47′17.89″S 151°54′13.67″E	
Samuel Gilbert Public School	Castle Hill	North West	1986	33°42′50.12″S 150°59′31.68″E	
Samuel Terry Public School	Cranebrook	Greater West	1985	33°42′47.32″S 150°42′33.14″E	
Sanctuary Point Public School	Sanctuary Point	South Coast	1976	35°6′21.37″S 150°37′45.94″E	
Sandon Public School	Armidale	New England	1956	30°29′51.49″S 151°39′17.9″E	
Sandy Beach Public School	Sandy Beach	Mid North Coast	1992	30°9′13.56″S 153°11′9.05″E	
Sandy Hollow Public School	Sandy Hollow	Hunter	1877	32°20′10.52″S 150°34′8.68″E	
Sans Souci Public School	Sans Souci	Southern Sydney	1885	33°59′40.24″S 151°7′49.05″E	
Sarah Redfern High School	Minto	Macarthur region	1981	34°1′36.14″S 150°51′2.98″E	
Sarah Redfern Public School	Minto	Macarthur region	1978	34°1′40″S 150°51′5.28″E	
Saturday School of Community Languages – Secondary College of Languages	Admin: Darlinghurst; School: Parramatta	Greater West	1978	33°48′49.78″S 151°0′29.78″E	
Savernake Public School	Savernake	Riverina	1885	35°43′53.39″S 146°2′46.75″E	
Sawtell Public School	Sawtell	Mid North Coast	1924	30°21′49.24″S 153°5′51.76″E	
Scarborough Public School	Scarborough	Illawarra	1878	34°15′56.95″S 150°57′58.28″E	
Schofields Public School	Schofields	Greater West	1919	33°41′33.4″S 150°52′29.66″E	
School of the Air	Broken Hill	Far West	1956	26°35′35.5″S 118°29′49.16″E	
Scone High School	Scone	Hunter	1889	32°3′23.26″S 150°52′17.23″E	
Scone Public School	Scone	Hunter	1863	32°2′58.15″S 150°51′48.68″E	
Scotts Head Public School	Scotts Head	Mid North Coast	1945	30°44′57.87″S 152°59′44.05″E	
Seaforth Public School	Seaforth	Northern Beaches	1881	33°47′38.03″S 151°15′3.76″E	
Seaham Public School	Seaham	Hunter	1852	32°39′43.79″S 151°43′49.13″E	
Sefton High School	Sefton	Greater West	1961	33°52′46.27″S 151°0′31.05″E	
Sefton Infants School	Sefton	Greater West	1952	33°53′22.22″S 151°0′34.36″E	
Seven Hills High School	Seven Hills	Greater West	1959	33°45′46.36″S 150°56′41.49″E	
Seven Hills North Public School	Seven Hills	Greater West	1959	33°45′38.62″S 150°57′18.22″E	
Seven Hills Public School	Seven Hills	Greater West	1954	33°46′14.41″S 150°56′18.73″E	
Seven Hills West Public School	Seven Hills	Greater West	1958	33°45′58.31″S 150°55′18.33″E	
Shalvey Public School	Shalvey	Greater West	1974	33°43′34.96″S 150°48′33.52″E	
Shell Cove Public School	Shell Cove	Illawarra	2005	34°35′44.98″S 150°51′15.64″E	
Shelley Public School	Blacktown	Greater West	1967	33°47′21.12″S 150°55′4.16″E	
Shellharbour Public School	Shellharbour	Illawarra	1974	34°34′43.61″S 150°51′57.1″E	
Shepherds Park School	Wagga Wagga	Riverina	1985	35°7′49.13″S 147°20′40.45″E	
Sherwood Grange Public School	Merrylands West	Greater West	1963	33°50′10.79″S 150°57′36.18″E	
Sherwood Ridge Public School	Kellyville	Greater West	2004	33°42′25.89″S 150°58′34.5″E	
Shoal Bay Public School	Shoal Bay	Hunter	1991	32°43′43.66″S 152°10′26.14″E	
Shoalhaven Heads Public School	Shoalhaven Heads	South Coast	1861	34°51′12.97″S 150°44′24.21″E	
Shoalhaven High School	Nowra	South Coast	1983	34°53′47.68″S 150°36′36.68″E	
Shortland Public School	Shortland	Hunter	1927	32°52′53.9″S 151°41′43.72″E	
Singleton Heights Public School	Singleton Heights	Hunter	1978	32°32′55.66″S 151°9′48.8″E	
Singleton High School	Singleton Heights	Hunter	1940	32°34′7.6″S 151°10′37.48″E	
Singleton Public School	Singleton Heights	Hunter	1852	32°33′48″S 151°10′16.87″E	
Sir Eric Woodward Memorial School	St Ives	Upper North Shore	1975	33°43′11.11″S 151°10′46.09″E	
Sir Joseph Banks High School	Revesby	South West	1960	33°56′20.37″S 151°1′12.37″E	
Smithfield Public School	Smithfield	Greater West	1850	33°51′12.65″S 150°56′2.61″E	
Smithfield West Public School	Wetherill Park	Greater West	1964	33°51′27.73″S 150°55′4″E	
Smiths Hill High School	Wollongong	Illawarra	1916	34°25′6.74″S 150°53′45.64″E	
Smithtown Public School	Smithtown	Mid North Coast	1891	31°1′2.9″S 152°56′29.12″E	
Snowy Valleys School	Tumut	Riverina	1974	35°18′12″S 148°13′16″E	
Sofala Public School	Sofala	Central Tablelands	1878	33°4′54.58″S 149°41′42.92″E	
Soldiers Point Public School	Soldiers Point	Hunter	1947	32°42′34.44″S 152°3′52.54″E	
Somersby Public School	Somersby	Central Coast	1893	33°21′31.58″S 151°17′27.52″E	
Somerton Public School	Somerton	New England	1880	30°56′18.11″S 150°38′28.93″E	
South Coogee Public School	South Coogee	Eastern Sydney	1945	33°55′59.98″S 151°15′14.55″E	
South Grafton High School	South Grafton	Mid North Coast	1964	29°42′57.66″S 152°55′52.51″E	
South Grafton Public School	South Grafton	Mid North Coast	1867	29°42′37.22″S 152°56′15.79″E	
South Sydney High School	Maroubra	Eastern Suburbs	1953	33°56′41.58″S 151°14′4.9″E	
South Wagga Public School	Wagga Wagga	Riverina	1892	35°7′8.09″S 147°22′1.31″E	
South West Rocks Public School	South West Rocks	Mid North Coast	1897	30°53′30″S 153°2′23.27″E	
Speers Point Public School	Speers Point	Hunter	1957	32°57′32.99″S 151°37′21.35″E	
Spring Farm Public School	Macarthur	Hunter	2016	34°4′12.92″S 150°42′55.63″E	
Spring Hill Public School	Spring Hill	Central West	1878	33°23′55.02″S 149°9′3.33″E	
Spring Ridge Public School	Spring Ridge	North West Slopes	1874	31°23′31.85″S 150°15′17.81″E	
Spring Terrace Public School	Spring Terrace	Central West	1869	33°23′38.34″S 149°5′48.27″E	
Springdale Heights Public School	Springdale Heights	Riverina	1981	36°1′56.11″S 146°57′2.03″E	
Springwood High School	Faulconbridge	Blue Mountains	1967	33°41′8.75″S 150°32′59.96″E	
Springwood Public School	Springwood	Blue Mountains	1878	33°42′17.72″S 150°34′25.57″E	
Stanford Merthyr Infants School	Stanford Merthyr	Hunter	1903	32°49′25.43″S 151°29′44.99″E	
Stanmore Public School	Stanmore	Inner West	1884	33°53′43.34″S 151°9′52.63″E	
Stanwell Park Public School	Stanwell Park	Illawarra	1917	34°13′44.72″S 150°59′4.23″E	
Stewart House School	Curl Curl	Northern Beaches	1931	33°46′24.55″S 151°17′28.42″E	
Stockinbingal Public School	Stockinbingal	Riverina	1894	34°29′53.44″S 147°52′58.64″E	
Stockton Public School	Stockton	Hunter	1861	32°54′40.94″S 151°46′51.21″E	
Stokers Siding Public School	Stokers Siding	Northern Rivers	1917	28°23′37.64″S 153°24′14.89″E	
Stratford Public School	Stratford	Mid North Coast	1907	32°7′0.86″S 151°56′21.51″E	
Stratheden Public School	Stratheden	Northern Rivers	1914	28°45′18.96″S 152°56′12.19″E	
Strathfield Girls High School	Strathfield	Inner West	1953	33°52′26.31″S 151°5′8.3″E	
Strathfield North Public School	North Strathfield	Inner West	1915	33°51′18.38″S 151°5′33.35″E	
Strathfield South High School	Enfield	Inner West	1960	33°53′7.64″S 151°4′17.63″E	
Strathfield South Public School	Strathfield South	Inner West	1881	33°53′29.83″S 151°5′3.54″E	
Stroud Public School	Stroud	Mid-North Coast	1882	32°24′9.67″S 151°57′50.34″E	
Stroud Road Public School	Stroud Road	Mid-North Coast	1919	32°20′54.45″S 151°55′55.86″E	
Stuart Town Public School	Stuart Town	Central West	1867	32°48′8.06″S 149°4′8.72″E	
Stuarts Point Public School	Stuarts Point	Mid-North Coast	1891	30°49′10.53″S 152°59′34.97″E	
Sturt Public School	Kooringal	Riverina	1973	35°8′12.35″S 147°22′41.81″E	
Summer Hill Public School	Summer Hill	Inner West	1883	33°53′44.84″S 151°8′10.32″E	
Sunshine Bay Public School	Sunshine Bay	South Coast	1985	35°44′27.12″S 150°12′37.65″E	
Surveyors Creek Public School	Glenmore Park	Greater West	2002	33°47′16.42″S 150°41′23.18″E	
Sussex Inlet Public School	Sussex Inlet	South Coast	1907	35°10′1.75″S 150°35′2.55″E	
Sutherland Hospital School	Caringbah	Southern Sydney	1965	34°2′14.86″S 151°6′52.88″E	
Sutherland North Public School	Sutherland	Southern Sydney	1948	34°1′36.7″S 151°4′1.3″E	
Sutherland Public School	Sutherland	Southern Sydney	1887	34°1′59.5″S 151°3′31.79″E	
Sutton Public School	Sutton	Southern Tablelands	1871	35°9′55.16″S 149°15′19.19″E	
Swansea High School	Caves Beach	Hunter	1965	33°6′15.61″S 151°38′24.13″E	
Swansea Public School	Swansea	Hunter	1875	33°5′1.55″S 151°38′10.06″E	
Sydney Boys High School	Moore Park	Inner City	1883	33°53′32.69″S 151°13′12.82″E	
Sydney Children's Hospital School	Randwick	Eastern Sydney	1997	33°55′1.76″S 151°14′17.9″E	
Sydney Distance Education High School	Woolloomooloo	Inner City	2002	33°52′15.8″S 151°13′13.76″E	
Sydney Distance Education Primary School	Surry Hills	Inner City	1991	33°53′10.37″S 151°12′45.44″E	
Sydney Girls High School	Surry Hills	Eastern Sydney	1883	33°53′38.2″S 151°13′14.32″E	
Sydney Secondary College – Balmain Campus	Rozelle	Inner City	2002	33°51′30″S 151°10′12″E	
Sydney Secondary College – Blackwattle Bay Campus	Glebe	Inner City	2002	33°52′30″S 151°11′16″E	
Sydney Secondary College – Leichhardt Campus	Leichhardt	Inner City	2002	33°52′45″S 151°9′32″E	
Sydney Technical High School	Bexley	Southern Sydney	1911	33°57′43.57″S 151°6′51.06″E	
Sylvania Heights Public School	Sylvania Heights	Southern Sydney	1953	34°0′46.7″S 151°5′47.36″E	
Sylvania High School	Sylvania	Southern Sydney	1970	34°1′3.37″S 151°6′13.35″E	
Sylvania Public School	Sylvania	Southern Sydney	1884	34°0′30.01″S 151°6′41.63″E	

== See also ==
Organisations

- Education in New South Wales
- Education in Australia
- New South Wales Education Standards Authority
- Australian Curriculum

Lists

- List of schools in New South Wales
- List of government schools in New South Wales
- List of non-government schools in New South Wales
- List of selective high schools in New South Wales
- List of Catholic schools in New South Wales
- List of Anglican schools in New South Wales
- List of Islamic schools in New South Wales
- Lists of schools in Australia
