= Rivers Secondary College =

The Rivers Secondary College

Location
- City of Lismore, Northern Rivers, New South Wales; Australia: 28°47′56″S 153°16′42″E (Richmond River High Campus); 28°49′13″S 153°17′49″E (Lismore High Campus); 28°49′04″S 153°20′19″E (Kadina High Campus)

Information
- Type: Government-funded co-educational multi-campus comprehensive secondary day school
- Established: 2016; 10 years ago
- School district: Lismore; Regional North
- Educational authority: NSW Department of Education
- Executive Principal: Chris Randle
- Teaching staff: 148.7 FTE (2022)
- Years: 7–12
- Enrolment: ~1,380 (2022)
- Campuses: Richmond River High Campus: Lake Street, North Lismore; Lismore High Campus: Dalley Street, East Lismore; Kadina High Campus: Kadina Street, Goonellabah
- Campus type: Regional
- Website: therivers.schools.nsw.gov.au; richmondri-h.schools.nsw.gov.au; lismore-h.schools.nsw.gov.au; kadina-h.schools.nsw.gov.au

The Rivers Secondary College is a multi-campus government-funded co-educational comprehensive secondary day school, with three campuses located in the City of Lismore in the Northern Rivers region of New South Wales, Australia.

Established in 2016 through the administrative merger of Richmond River High School, Lismore High School, and Kadina High School, combined the college enrolled approximately 1,380 students in 2022, from Year 7 to Year 12, including approximately 20 percent of whom identified as Indigenous Australians and approximately eight percent of whom are from a language background other than English. The college is operated by the NSW Department of Education; and the Executive Principal of the college is Chris Randle.

== See also ==
- List of government schools in New South Wales: Q–S
- Education in Australia
