= QHHS =

QHHS may refer to:

- Quakers Hill High School in Quakers Hill, New South Wales, Australia
- Quartz Hill High School in Quartz Hill, California, US
