= Laurie Nichols (rugby league) =

Australian rugby league supporter (1919–2000)

- Born: 1 January 1919; Cooma, New South Wales, Australia
- Died: 2 February 2000 (aged 81); Sydney, New South Wales, Australia
- Occupations: Boxer, wood carter, tanner, sports fan
- Years active: 1929−1999

Laurie Nichols (1 January 1919 – 2 February 2000) was an Australian supporter of the Balmain Tigers, well regarded as the "greatest" fan in Balmain Tigers history, most well known for his "shadowboxing", at the Tigers' home ground Leichhardt Oval.

== Early life ==
Laurie was born on 1 January 1919 into a family of 12 other siblings of which he was close to the middle. His father was a wood carter and Laurie would accompany him and deliver wood to the other homes in the area. At an early age he developed both an interest in sport and primary produce, and aged 10 he was first introduced to boxing at the local Police Boys Club. Aged in his early teens he started working in the General Store, still in Cooma, working off and on tanning and selling rabbit skins.

== The Number One Fan ==
In 1969 after the Balmain Tigers 11th Premiership, at age 50, the Balmain Leagues Club presented Laurie Nichols with a Balmain Jersey, inscribed on the back with "Number One Fan". This was the first recognition officially granted to the man who was not just a fan, as the title suggests, but was a true fanatic in the essential meaning of the word. Throughout the 1970s and 80s despite the hard times the Tigers were facing, Nichols still "religiously followed" the club. Benny Elias, the hooker for the Balmain Tigers said: "He'd be on the bus going to the games with the players and was at training as much as the players were. He was from Springwood and it's a long trip and he'd make the journey just to see us train. You don't get more fanatical than that." He lived and breathed for Balmain and attended every game for 30 years at Leichhardt Oval before the club merged with Western Suburbs Magpies.

=== Fox Sports ===
In 2017, Fox Sports Commentator Andrew Voss, has declared Laurie Nichols to be the NRL's best fan.

=== Laurie's Lane ===
On 28 June 2015, the laneway at Leichhardt Oval was named "Laurie's Lane", and the residents of Lilyfield painted a mural in dedication of him, at the lane.

== Balmain Tigers merger ==
In 1999, during the Super League War, the ARL and Super League agreed to merge with 14 teams, in their new competition, the NRL. During the war, the 17 teams of the ARL and Super League, had to fight for survival. The Balmain Tigers although always loyal to the ARL, the new financial requirements of the competition meant Balmain couldn't afford to go it alone. In 1999 talks of Balmain merging, first with the Parramatta Eels, and then with the Western Suburbs Magpies. At several public meetings, Laurie cried openly, tears flooding as he spoke passionately against any merge.

However, after much anxiety and a vote, it was decided that Balmain would merge with Wests, becoming the new "Wests Tigers" for the 2000 competition.

It is agreed that Laurie spoke to the team at their final training session before their first game the following week. Wayne Pearce, who was coach at the time, says that Laurie voiced his acceptance of the team, that he told the boys to keep the heart of the Tigers and that he wished them all the best. Benny Elias and close friend Johnny Lewis say that Laurie would never have said such a thing, and that he was always heartbroken about what happened to the team and to the club.

== Media appearances ==
Throughout the 1990s and early 2000s, Laurie starred in multiple TV Shows, including Pizza, where he played a shadowboxing and gymnasium-using hero, and the Footy Show, where he made a guest appearance, during a birthday special for Steve Roach.

== Death ==
In February 2000, Laurie Nichols died due to an ulcer rupturing in his stomach at the age of 81, he died just two weeks before the Wests Tigers made their debut match. At his funeral, over 1000 people attended, including Balmain Tigers Coach Wayne Pearce, and former Balmain Tigers Captain Ben Elias.
