= Queanbeyan High School =

Location
- Queanbeyan, Southern Tablelands, New South Wales; Australia; 35°21′11″S 149°13′17″E

Information
- Type: Government-funded co-educational comprehensive secondary day school
- Established: 1959; 67 years ago
- School district: Queanbeyan; Rural South and West
- Educational authority: NSW Department of Education
- Principal: Vanessa Willetts
- Teaching staff: 52.9 FTE (2018)
- Years: 7–12
- Enrolment: ~500 (2018)
- Campus type: Regional
- Colours: Maroon, white and black
- Website: queanbeyan-h.schools.nsw.gov.au

Queanbeyan High School is a government-funded co-educational comprehensive secondary day school, located in Queanbeyan, in the Southern Tablelands region of New South Wales, Australia.

Established in 1959, the school enrolled approximately 500 students in 2018, from Year 7 to Year 12, of whom 13 per cent identified as Indigenous Australians and 22 per cent from a language background other than English. The school is operated by the NSW Department of Education; the principal is Vanessa Willetts.

== Overview ==
The school runs a number of innovative programs including The Personal Best program in which students select to be in these classes if they wish to be challenged and encouraged in their learning: The College Program in which Year 11 and 12 sit for three subjects each year, and sit for the Higher School Certificate. Over two years, students complete 6 subjects but this method reduces the stress, enables more subjects to run, and gives both years of senior study purpose and dignity.

== Notable alumni ==
- Allan Hawke AC – senior public servant, diplomat, former Chancellor of the Australian National University
- David Campese – Australian Rugby Union representative.

== See also ==
- List of government schools in New South Wales: Q–Z
- Education in Australia
- Karabar High School
