= Buckland Convalescent Home =

Heritage-listed former hospital in New South Wales, Australia

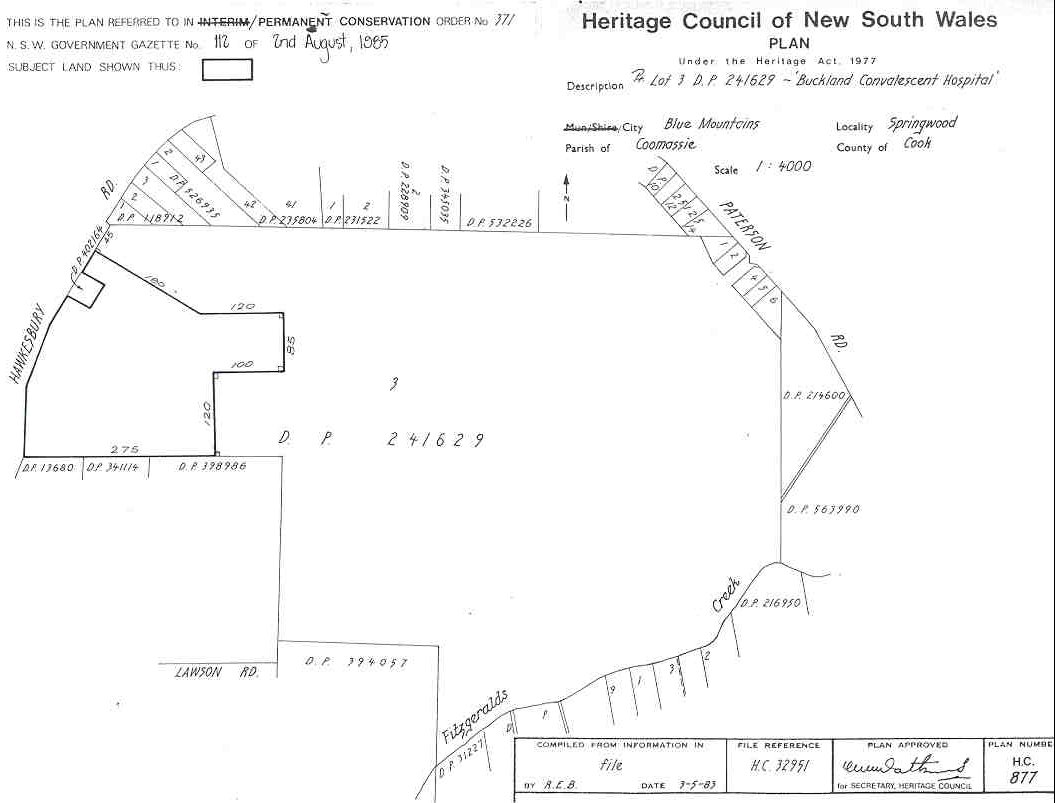
- Heritage boundaries

- Location within New South Wales Location within Australia
- 33°41′38″S 150°34′37″E
- Location: 39 Hawkesbury Road, Springwood, City of Blue Mountains, New South Wales, Australia

History
- Built: 1881–1934

Site notes
- Architects: Thomas Buckland; McPhee Smith
- Owner: The Buckland Convalescent Hospital

New South Wales Heritage Register
- Official name: Buckland Convalescent Home & Garden
- Type: State heritage (complex / group)
- Designated: 2 April 1999
- Reference no.: 371
- Type: Convalescence Home
- Category: Health Services
- Builders: Kell & Rigby

Buckland Convalescent Home is a heritage-listed former residence and private parkland and now convalescent hospital located at 39 Hawkesbury Road, Springwood, in the Blue Mountains region of New South Wales, Australia. It was designed by Thomas Buckland and McPhee Smith and was built from 1881 to 1934 by Kell & Rigby. It is also known as Buckland Convalescent Home and Garden. The property is owned by The Buckland Convalescent Hospital. It was added to the New South Wales State Heritage Register on 2 April 1999.

== History ==
=== Indigenous history ===
Reports of numerous bushfires in the Blue Mountains in the 1820s is seen as evidence of Aboriginal presence in the area. Recent studies have revealed evidence of occupation back some 14,000 years. The arrival of Europeans and the introduction of diseases such as smallpox, saw the Aboriginal population decimated as early as 1789 when a widespread epidemic, according to Captain John Hunter (1793) "swept off hundreds of the natives in the winter of 1789". Apparently quick to assimilate, the Aboriginal group around Springwood 'in 1819 the "Chef de Springwood" Aurang- Jack...was in European dress and the elderly leader Karadra was smoking a clay pipe'.

By the 1991 census only 65 Aboriginal people were recorded living in the area. The clan associated with Springwood was identified as the Oryang-Ora (Aurang), and there are a number of known sites containing Aboriginal evidence in the Springwood area, though none known to the Buckland Village.

=== Colonial history ===
Buckland Village chronology: Phase 1 of development covers the period 1876–1934 and is believed to incorporate the following development and landscape features:

- farm residence;
- outbuilding and paddocks/orchard;
- additional six-roomed cottage (the position of this has not been established);
- dam (other side of boundary);
- water feature;
- sandstone-edged pathways;
- landscaping, including exotic pines along the northern boundary;
- large dam and probably a second dam;
- driveway from Hawkesbury Road.

In February 1876 James Bentley Corbin was granted 16 hectares (40 acres) at Springwood - portion 97. In December 1876 John Thomas Ellison was granted 16 hectares (40 acres) - portion 72.

In January 1881 Dr. James Norton MLA was granted 20 hectares (50 acres) "under the Volunteer Force Regulation Act of 1867" – portion 38 – property was named Euchora. Norton was a Member of the NSW Legislative Assembly and Postmaster General in the Stuart Government. He originally received 20 hectares (50 acres) in the late 1870s and purchased a further 8.9 hectares (22 acres) which were parts of Portions 71 and 137, originally granted to John Thomas Ellison in 1876.

Dr Norton erected a cottage on the land in 1884, and named it Euchora. He is reported as being a keen horticulturist and naturalist. His garden around "Norton Hall" at Leichhardt was extensive and renowned, and it is said that he compiled a list of the native flora of the place, as well as introducing many exotics. A dam was constructed in the lower portion of the land and water was pumped up to a reservoir on Hawkesbury Road from which the extensive gardens were watered.

In 1898 lands and portions were partly amalgamated by Norton. He died in 1906.

In 1906 the land was sold to John Francis King. In 1910 King sold it to Frederick Henry GriffithBroughton. Broughton built a separate cottage of six rooms to the Hawkesbury Road frontage in 1917. The current parcel of land appears to have been consolidated about this time. Euchora was operated as a guest house for many years by Mrs Breen, who later ran The Ferns guest house (now demolished), opposite Springwood railway station.

A site plan of this era showed Euchora (two buildings, a separate cluster of outbuildings towards Haweksbury Road, a tennis court to the east and an orchard to the north-east.

In 1934 DP1093214 survey dated 24/3/1934 – land area was 52 hectares (129 acres), or 32 perches.

Buckland Hospital's site is partly occupies the former property of Silva Plana, a landscaped site of 14 hectares (35 acres) and a house built in 1881 as a country retreat by John Frazer, wholesale grocer and merchant (what became "John Frazer and Son" from 1847 in Sydney), who from 1874 to 1884 was a member of the NSW Legislative Assembly and a philanthropist. Two fine fountains, one in Hyde Park South, the other between the Land Titles Office and St. Mary's Cathedral in Sydney are memorials to his generosity. The University of Sydney, where he hoped to fund the chair of History, awards a Frazer scholarship in history, and he was a founding Councillor on the Presbyterian foundation, St. Andrew's College and donor of funds to the Presbyterian ministry studying there. Sir Henry Parkes' son Varney designed Silva Plana. The Frazer Memorial Church (opened 1895) in Springwood is a striking example of his (and broader) Victorian philanthropy, financed entirely from his and his widow, Elizabeth's generosity. Frazer died in 1884. Mrs Frazer sent her gardener from Silva Plana to lay out the grounds and plant the trees around this church, the first in Springwood of any denomination.

In March 1934 Sir Thomas Buckland, miner, pastoralist, businessman (mining investor, company chairman and president of the Bank of NSW) and philanthropist discussed a proposal with the NSW Government to purchase land and establish a hospital, furnish and endow it, on the proviso that the State would upgrade Springwood's water supply.

In May 1934 a Deed of Trust between Buckland Esq. and Trustees: Thomas Buckland; Rt. Rev. Sydney James Kirkby, Bishop Coadjutor of the Diocese of Sydney; Dr. C. K. Hogg, inspector-general of mental hospitals in NSW: R. W. Gillespie, merchant; A. J. Taylor, solicitor; and David Roxburgh, solicitor - was signed to establish "The Buckland Hospital".

=== Buckland Convalescent Hospital ===
==== The Trust Deed ====
Thomas Buckland purchased Euchora in 1934, and the Buckland Hospital Trust was established by a trust deed, registered on 20 August 1934. The deed states, inter-alia:

...the said Thomas Buckland is desirous of establishing a public hospital for the relief of female mental patients in the state of New South Wales....[and]....has agreed to transfer or to vest in the Trustees securities or moneys of the value of one hundred thousand pounds (hereinafter referred to as the Trust Fund) to enable them to purchase a site for and to erect and equip such a hospital.....

The trust fund was also to be put to the provision of 25 beds and also "... for the medical nursing and domestic staff necessary for the conduct of such Hospital which shall be erected according to plans and specifications approved by the Trustees."

==== Hospital building ====
The design for the hospital was prepared by Buckland and McPhee Smith, architects. One of Thomas Buckland's sons, Harold Buckland, was a principal of that firm. The contract for the erection of the hospital was let to Kell & Rigby, builders for A£28,500 in May 1935.

One of the conditions of Buckland's gift was that the state government should install a permanent water supply to the town of Springwood, including the hospital. This was completed, including a reinforced concrete tank holding 500,000 imperial gallons (2.3 ML; 600,000 US gal), reticulation to the hospital and other lower Blue Mountains villages, in 1935.

==== Early years ====
The first matron of the BCH was Matron Rothery, whose diaries from the beginning of 1936, up until 1940 were examined in detail to try to gain some insight into the establishment and operation of the hospital during its early years.

In "Memoranda from 1935", Matron Rothery notes that on 15 November, she and Sister Heard visited Springwood, where Mr Taylor met them at the train, and they had dinner at his house. They inspected the Buckland Hospital later.

During the course of November and December, various items of hardware, kitchenware and other equipment of the hospital were purchased from Anthony Hordens in Sydney. On 23 December 1935, Matron Rothery and Sister Heard took up residence at the Hospital, and there are entries pertaining to the organisation of monogrammed bed linen and other paraphernalia needed for the function of the Hospital during December.

Sir Thomas Buckland is noted as visiting first on Friday 3 January 1936 staying the night and leaving the next morning. Miss Beatrice Buckland, the Hospital's first patient was admitted on Wednesday 3 February, and was brought to the Hospital by Mr Harold Buckland.

The ongoing entries for the period detail the employment of staff, staff movements and illnesses, planting of shrubs and plants from "Rosens", the weather, accounts, purchase of hardware, works being undertaken around the place, minor building maintenance and rectification and all the minutiae of getting the Hospital up and running.

The official opening is entered at Saturday 25 January 1936:

'The entrance doors of hospital draped with royal mourning. [George V had died on Tuesday 25th] 3 p.m. Hospital officially opened by the Premier, Mr B S B Stevens-Stones unveiled by the Premier and Sir Thomas Buckland, chairman of the trustees.

Sir Thomas and Lady Buckland took a keen and active interest in the formative period of the Hospital, and Sir Thomas was involved in details such as the selection of the linoleum for the hallways. He visited on a regular basis for both practical, administrative purposes and to visit his daughter. During 1936, he visited or corresponded on some 50 occasions, in 1937, 25 and by 1938, 45. By this time, Sir Thomas was 90 years old, and was still driving up from Hunters Hill to Springwood'.

Sir Thomas died on 11 June 1947, two weeks prior to his 99th birthday at his residence, Lyndhurst in Hunters Hill. His estate was valued at £589,958: after £40,000 bequests to each surviving child (2 sons, 3 daughters), legacies of £24,000 to other family members and some £11,000 to sundry schools and hospitals, he left 2/3 of the residue to the Buckland Convalescent Hospital, Springwood and the income of 1/3 to the Church of England homes for children.

The second phase is believed to represent the development of the property during the 1934–1983 period and incorporates the following development and landscape features:

- the hospital;
- caretaker's cottage;
- tennis court (from phase 1 – converted to a croquet court);
- dairy;
- paddocks and chook shed;
- formalising the driveway from Hawkesbury Road;
- landscaping;
- fibro cottage;
- kitchen garden and flower garden;
- 1946 renovations – probably the sun room and verandah infills (two-storey section);
- fire stairs installed.

==== Buckland Village ====
In 1971, the Directors of the BCH were compelled to sell five residential blocks fronting Patterson Road to supplement income.

In 1973, it was decided to sell a further 79 acres to Leighton Properties for a housing development, but the sale fell through because Blue Mountains City Council would not agree to re-zoning the land for residential purposes. At the end of 1973, the directors resolved to offer the whole of the property to the Church of England Retirement Villages at a peppercorn rent, and also indicated that they would be prepared to supplement costs via a contribution from the investment income of the BCH. This proposal also fell through as the then NSW Crown Solicitor opposed the scheme. A similar approach had also been made to NSW Legacy, but failed for the same reason.

In 1977, it was decided to reorganise the operation of the BCH, as it had shown an operating loss of $123,516 for 1976/77. The company had not shown an operating profit since 1969. It was decided that the then chairman, Mr T B (Basil) Silk, MBE, be asked to vacate the chair and take up the position of General Manager, effective 1 June 1977. During the subsequent financial year, the deficit was reduced to $53,116. The Board decided that further action was needed and sought to put the greatest asset of the BCH, the land, to better use. It was decided that the use of the place as a retirement village should be explored. Discussions were had with the Crown Solicitors, and the NSW Attorney General, Frank Walker, who indicated support for the proposal. legal opinion was sought over the ensuing period and an action commenced in the courts to alter the terms of the trust deed.

Basil Silk, Director of the BCH filed an affidavit in the hearing before the Supreme Court of New South Wales (N 1547 of 1982) in which the need for the alteration to the Trust Deed was dealt with in some detail.

He cited an "Inquiry into Health Services for the Psychiatrically Ill and Developmentally Disabled" (The Richmond Report), published by the New South Wales Health Commission in March 1983. This outlined the need for expanding need of care for the aged, and in particular, those suffering from dementia. The major problems highlighted included:

- Inadequate and inappropriate accommodation:
- Lack of skilled staff trained in assessing and treating the psychiatric disorders of old age;
- Lack if support services for families who are the major "therapists" for demented people;
- Lack of services such as laundry, home help, handy man, temporary care facilities, etc. the provision of which could obviate inappropriate nursing home placement;
- Lack of other community services which would assist in reducing social isolation.

As can be seen, the curtilage defined appears to relate, in part, to the "prospect" from the BCH building itself, to the east, and encompasses the area back to Hawkesbury Road which includes the access road.

Apart from the inclusion of these elements of the original layout, the remainder of the area identified would appear to be largely arbitrary. There has also been considerable development, either partially or fully, within this curtilage since the PCO was created in 1985.

Phase 3 – 1984–2003 – Buckland Village – with approval of the alteration of the Trust to provide "three tiered facilities" in 1983 and classification of the site as "Special Purpose Hospital" a period of rapid expansion followed.

Between 1983 and 1992 a number of scattered new (two-three storey) accommodation buildings were added broadly "around" the existing front drive, western, southern, northern and eastern parts of the main complex. A large curving 'wing marking an arc to the north-east of the axis of the main hospital complex was also added in this period.

The tennis court was altered to form a croquet lawn, the sun room additions and fire stairs were all installed by this time. The paddock photos reveal the extent of clearing including removal of some former pine trees associated with "Euchora" era development.

Since 1984 additional buildings and improvements have been made in keeping with the requirements of the Public Hospitals Act 1929. These additional buildings and associated landscaping such as road access and plantings have occurred in a number of stages as noted below and illustrated in figure 2.7 – Phase 3 of development.

First stage

- Demolition of fibro cottage and large chook shed;
- development of isolated self-care units in blocks of four, and one of six units;
- one block of 16 studio units (bed-sitters);
- one block of 24 studio units (bed sitters);
- one expanse of 40 hostel units;
- two dual-occupancy units;
- dairy converted to a small community centre;
- landscaping and paddocks.

Second stage;

- 14 three bedroom cottages;
- multi-purpose community centre;
- hostel community centre and link to 24 studio units (which were converted to hostel unit use);
- flat roofed carports for some self-care units.

Between 1992 and 2002 two further "clusters" of detached accommodation buildings were added in the far east and south-east extent of the cleared part of the property, below the rest of the complex. A further three buildings were added to the "arc" noted above (1983–92), and to the south of the oval perimeter drive around the complex.

==== Further development ====
As outlined above, at the chronology, it is intended to build a 62 Bed Nursing Home, essentially to replace the high care accommodation contained in the Buckland Convalescent Hospital and an ancillary 40 bed Nursing Home, run by Buckland Convalescent Hospital at Wentworth Falls.

A number of alternative designs have been prepared by Simmat & Associates Architects Pty Ltd over the intervening period, some of which are included at Appendix A. There is currently a development application before the Blue Mountains City Council proposing such a development.

== Description ==
Landscape Setting

The "Building" article of July 12, 1935 (vol.56, no.335) – the second of two consecutive editions devoted to hospitals and similar institutions being built at that time) describing this hospital included:

'Every structure to some extent relies upon its garden and immediate surroundings for its final appeal. It is the intention of the architects to concentrate upon the layout of the grounds in which scheme the treatment of the main courtyard will play an important part'.

One of the hospital's greatest assets was and is its location. The fact that it was away from the rush and bustle of the city, located in a very tranquil, stress-free location, the fresh, clean air and ability to provide good, substantial food was seen as very conducive to achieving well-being.

The site consists of approx. 52 hectares (129 acres) and has an easterly view towards the city of Sydney. "On clear days the city and harbour bridge can be discerned easily on the horizon". In addition to the aspect the site is also situated beneath the main ridge and protected from the westerly winds.

The architects, Buckland & McPhee Smith adopted '...the U-shaped plan with the wings facing east and having the main entrance face on the west. The kitchen and service block has been placed on the central axis on the opposite side of the building to the courtyard, being connected to the main block by a series of massive stone elliptical arches, that in addition to performing this practical purpose, provide an attractive entrance feature.

It would appear that the primary orientation was towards the views to Sydney in the distant east, and that there is little evidence of an attempt to maximise solar access. The current view is generally obscured by trees.

Although alluded to in the "Building" article, where it states: "It is the intenteion of the architects to concentrate upon the layout of the grounds in which scheme the treatment of the main courtyard will play an important part", there is no direct evidence of a landscape "design" as such.

The courtyard is a relatively formal axial arrangement in which a fountain and flagpole has been placed as a centrepiece and a path and surround directs the view towards the city in the distance. It would appear that the courtyard was intended to frame the view out of the hospital, rather than being a conscious part of its "setting", although it did function in that role, to some extent, in views from the croquet lawn.

The fountain appears tob e in very original condition (complete with frogs, which were recently replenished). Beyond the fountain is the croquet lawns, which survive and are still used by residents.

The courtyard planting appears to have changed over the years, with palms (Chusan/Chinese windmill palm (Trachycarpus fortunei) and Argentine jelly palm: Butia capitata - which is unusual-rare are apparent in old photographs) being apparent in the earlier photographs. Matron Rothery's diaries quite fastidiously note the plants which were purchased from time to time, including shrubs, vegetable seeds etc. Much of the planting appears to have been an accumulation of popular ornamentals and exotics of the time, and the vegetable garden was located to the north of buildings where there was good sunlight.

The courtyard's central path is flanked by pairs of dwarf golden conifers, Japanese sacred bamboo (Nandina domestica "Pygmaea", with other shrubs planted around its perimeter against the building wings.

Some notion of the type of planting originally used is available in photographs, which appear to be from the 1930s period, reproduced in Appendix B.

The southern side appears to have a cut-flower garden (at least early in the hospital operations).

An undated, probably 1950s aerial photograph, shows the vegetable garden, cottage and dairy to the north, west and south of the hospital "U" shape (facing east). Outbuildings to the east of the cottage may date from the "Euchora" period.

As outlined in the "Building" article of 1935, there was an intention of making the hospital more or less self-sufficient in terms of produce – or at least able to supplement bought produce with fresh. There was a dairy, fowl run, and an ongoing vegetable and cut-flower gardening, preserve and jam-making. There are a number of entries in Matron's diaries as to the making of jams, particularly.

The hospital was active in the local show scene, exhibiting flowers, particularly, and winning numerous awards.

The south western grounds grazed dairy cows. The dairy was located to the south (now a community centre), near the main entry. It is of similar materials to the main building and very much in simple, vernacular style, with a Marseilles tile roof and similar joinery to the hospital proper. There is some evidence in the diaries that it may have been built to house Beatrice Buckland, although one would expect it more likely to have been the manager's cottage or somesuch.

The Water Supply

It may be remembered that one of the conditions made by Sir Thomas Buckland when he made his munificent gift was that the State Government should install a permanent water supply to the town of Springwood, which, of course, includes the hospital. This system is now almost complete, the storage reservoir having been constructed on the heights of Faulconbridge. This massive reinforced concrete tank has a capacity of 500,000 gallons and reticulation to the hospital and the other lower Mountain towns, which will benefit greatly by this much-needed improvement, is now almost complete (1935).

It was noted that the quantity surveyors, Thompson & Wark, provided their services in an honorary capacity, and that the BCH was one of few such institutions that did not rely on Government support.

It is certainly very gratifying to see a public-spirited citizen...endowing an institution to do useful work for the community which will support itself in perpetuity. Such practical munificence deserves the hearty applause of all.

Patients' Bedrooms

From the entrance vestibule, which may be described as the hub of the whole building, corridors run to the end of the main buildings and then at right angles through the wings. Patients' bedrooms, twenty-four in number, one to each patient, are located in these wings.

In the design and equipment of these rooms it was necessary for the architect to continually bear in mind the purpose for which they were constructed. Thus we find the light fittings countersunk in the ceiling so as to be well out of the way of any abuse that they might receive at the hands of an over-wrought patient. The taps on the hand-basins are of the patent spring-catch variety, which have to be held the whole time that water is desired, so that there will be no danger of patients leaving the water on to overflow and cause damage. Provision has also been made for a stop-cock under the floor of each room so that the water supply can be eliminated if the mental condition of the patient so requires.

The Equipment

feature of the equipment of the bedrooms is the built-in loughboy [sic] and chest-of-drawers, while the adjustable mirror situated in the open space is particularly neat and well thought out. The top of the chest-of-drawers is covered by plate glass in a stainless steel surround. The whole of the doors to the bedrooms are of Beale's solid core Queensland walnut flush panel variety. The portions of the walls behind the basins are tiled and fitted with toothbrush and tumbler holders and towel rails. Each room is also fitted with patient's call and light indicator to attract the attention of the nurse on duty. A feature of each bedroom is the colour scheme, the walls being blended in numerous light pastel shades with the joinery and furniture in a contrasting colour of bright enamel. Two rooms for special cases and a sick bay are also included in the scheme. Both wings terminate in a pavilion which provides additional veranda accommodation. Box and linen rooms provide adequate storage space, access from outside being available by a service entrance, thus obviating the necessity for delivery of linen and patients' trunks through the main vestibule.

The two main lavatory blocks take up portion of each side of the main block and are particularly interesting in that they are fitted up to meet the special demands of the institution. None of the baths have any taps adjacent to them, hot and cold water to all being remote-controlled by the nurse on duty, a special thermostatic mixer being provided, while all taps are of the key-controlled asylum type.

First Floor

The first floor of the main building accommodates the staff, the largest unit being the Matron's flat, which comprises living room, bedroom, bathroom and entrance hall, double doors from the living room providing access to the flat roof over the porte cochere. In addition there are seven nurses' bedrooms and four domestic staff bedrooms, all of which are supplied with hot water. The staff and nurses' common rooms, equipped with fireplaces and bookcases are roomy and comfortable.

The service and dining room block, which as already described, is connected with the main building by means of the arched porte cochere, contains the main patients' Dining Room, which is a delightfully proportioned room with a large fireplace centrally situated on the long wall flanked by two large windows on either side. The ceiling is heavily beamed. The staff dining room is adjacent, and both are conveniently situated for service from the kitchen.

Kitchen and Service

The kitchen and scullery are specially equipped with stainless steel sinks and tables, adequate cupboards and cooking equipment which includes a fuel range, steam-heated Bain Marie and serving table, steam tea urn, steam heated towel rack and other equipment. The whole of the visible pipes, taps, etc. are chromium plated, while all the woodwork is enamelled and the backs of all cupboards and the walls are all tiled to facilitate cleaning. Storeroom equipment includes plenty of shelving, special vegetable containers with movable wire shelves, refrigerator cabinet and compressor unit. Much of the kitchen equipment, one notes, has been supplied by Metters.

The boiler room is fitted with a low pressure steam boiler for hot water and steam for the building: special hoppers in convenient positions have been constructed for the storage of fuel. The fuel supply to the kitchen has been so arranged by means of an iron door in the main fuel bin that coke can be discharged direct for the range. A feature of the laundry, and on which will undoubtedly prove a great boon in the winter, is the steam drying cabinet, that is capable of dealing with all the washing from the whole if the inmates.

The Exterior

In the treatment of the exterior, the architects have derived their inspiration from the Georgian period of design. They have certainly been wise in their choice, for the building of this institutional character must, of necessity, be somewhat large and comprise lengthy facades and wide roof areas. Consequently the simplicity of detail and reliance upon good proportioning that is the charm of this style, makes it particularly adaptable to this type of work. While dignified in appearance, it retains that air of homeliness and comfort which is so essential for the building of this type.

It was realised that it was of importance for the welfare and recovery of the patients that the building and its surroundings should be as bright and cheerful as possible, consequently the brick work is of a warm red colour, relieved with slightly darker bricks as a base course and in the quoins' heads and sills. The roofing tiles, supplied by W. Wilson Ltd. are also rich in colour and pleasant to look upon, which is important for the roof areas are extensive. As a central crowning feature to the main roof a small copper fleche surmounted by a cast bronze weathercock has been incorporated in the design.

The entrance features, as already mentioned, takes the form of an arcade and it is pleasing in these days of synthetic materials to see that good solid sandstone has been selected for the purpose. The simple but massively executed ironwork which forms the balustrading between the arches goes well with the stonework in its sincerity and robustness.

As outlined in the "Building" account, the exterior is generally in face brick, and a glazed Marseilles tiled roof. The design is a very sober, "Georgian"/Colonial revival influenced one, and is more or less rigorously symmetrical in terms of composition, although there are minor departures from this.

Some of the brickwork detailing is quite subtle, with the soldier course to the window heads, sills and quoining picked out in a darker, "liver" brick. The bricks generally are dry-pressed, in a mid-range red, with some darker bricks. The external ventilators are in glazed terra cotta, while the eaves are in tongue and grooved boarding, painted in an eau-de-nil to further perpetuate the "colonial revival" theme.

The windows are painted white to contrast with the brickwork, and are six-pane sashes generally, although four pane sashes are used to some of the smaller windows. Stucco detailing has also been used to pick out the entry decorations, and arches to the wing-ends.

=== Condition ===
Potential archaeological sites include the front driveway and environs, the former outbuilding on the northern side of this, the former "Euchora" house site (porte cochere of hospital area), the former orchard to the perimeter road's north-east, the former tennis court (croquet lawn).

=== Modifications and dates ===
- 1935–36 – hospital built
- 1971 – Directors sold five residential blocks fronting Patterson Road to supplement income.
- 1987 – new nursing home approved
- 2003 – new 60 bed nursing home approved
- 2006 – new Dining Room attached to a recent building known as Donald Coburn Lodge

== Heritage listing ==
As at 20 September 2012, the Buckland Convalescent Hospital is of a high level of significance due to its close association with a notable philanthropist in Sir Thomas Buckland. It is also of heritage value by virtue of its design as a seemingly seminal example of a totally "private" roomed establishment, and for its adaptation of the "Georgian"/Colonial Revival style to institutional buildings. It has historically been closely associated with the community of Blue Mountains town of Springwood, and now forms the centrepiece of Buckland Village, an aged care facility and community of some 420 people.

Buckland Convalescent Home was listed on the New South Wales State Heritage Register on 2 April 1999 having satisfied the following criteria.

The place is important in demonstrating the course, or pattern, of cultural or natural history in New South Wales.

The Buckland Convalescent Hospital demonstrates the establishment of a mental health care facility in the Blue Mountains region that was specifically addressed to the care of female patients.

The place has a strong or special association with a person, or group of persons, of importance of cultural or natural history of New South Wales's history.

The Buckland Convalescent Hospital is inextricably and eponymously associated with Sir Thomas Buckland who established and endowed the Hospital. Sir Thomas was a notable pastoralist, mining executive, businessman, philanthropist and chairman of Pitt Son and Badgery, the Bank of New South Wales (1922–1937), the United Insurance Co. Ltd and director of the Permanent Trustee Co. of NSW (from 1935). He took a vital interest in the place. It was designed by a firm of architects of which his son, Harold Buckland was a principal, and his daughter, Beatrice was the first patient.

The place is important in demonstrating aesthetic characteristics and/or a high degree of creative or technical achievement in New South Wales.

The Buckland Convalescent Hospital demonstrates the adoption of an historical antecedent style to the design of an institutional health building during the "interwar" period.

The place has a strong or special association with a particular community or cultural group in New South Wales for social, cultural or spiritual reasons.

The Buckland Convalescent Hospital has had a long association with the local community of Springwood, and has been active in community affairs since its inception in the latter part of the 1930s.

The place is important in demonstrating the principal characteristics of a class of cultural or natural places/environments in New South Wales.

It would appear that the Buckland Convalescent Hospital is an early example of a "nursing home" that accommodated a single patient per room.

== See also ==
- List of hospitals in New South Wales
