= Springwood, New South Wales =

Springwood
- Town
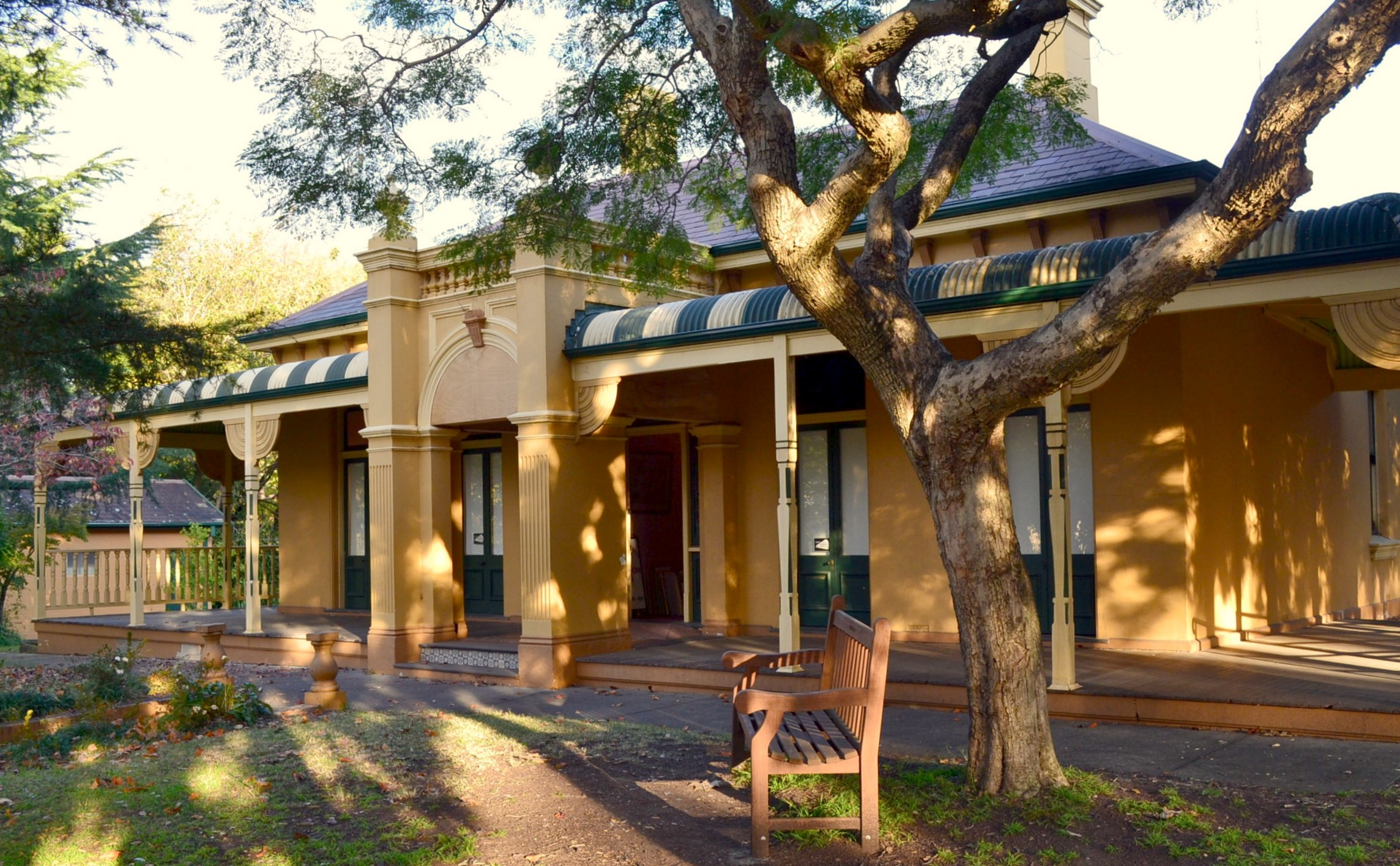
- Braemar (1892)

- Interactive map of Springwood
- Coordinates: 33.698799°S 150.564215°E
- Country: Australia
- State: New South Wales
- LGA: City of Blue Mountains
- First People: Dharug
- Location: 72 km (45 mi) west of Sydney CBD; 30 km (19 mi) east of Katoomba
- Established: circa 1815

Government
  - State electorate: Blue Mountains
  - Federal division: Macquarie
- Elevation: 371 m (1,217 ft)

Population
  - Total: 8,423 (2021 census)
- Postcode: 2777
- Mean max temp: 22.4 °C (72.3 °F)
- Mean min temp: 11.9 °C (53.4 °F)
- Annual rainfall: 1,086.3 mm (42.77 in)
Localities around Springwood
Faulconbridge	Winmalee	Faulconbridge
Faulconbridge	Springwood	Valley Heights
		Yellow Rock

Springwood is a town in the Blue Mountains, New South Wales, Australia. Springwood is located 72 kilometres west of the Sydney CBD in the local government area of the City of Blue Mountains. At the 2021 census, Springwood had a population 8,423 people.

Springwood is near the Blue Mountains National Park and the Greater Blue Mountains Area World Heritage Site. It is 371 metres above sea level and, like most of the towns in the vicinity, is located on a narrow ridge between two gorges. Winmalee is to the north. Springwood railway station sits between Valley Heights and Faulconbridge on the Blue Mountains railway line.

== History ==
The Springwood area was first occupied by the Oryang-Ora Aboriginal people belonging to the wider Dharug Aboriginal people of the wider Sydney region. They settled the area about 40,000 years ago, with many rock carvings and art sites in the area. At the time of European settlement the chief of the clan was Oryang Jack who was drawn by French artist Pellier.

"Oryang-Ora" was also the reference to the area that marked the dividing ridge line between the Dharug peoples of the north and the Gundungurra peoples to the south in the Blue Mountains area.

In 1815, Governor Lachlan Macquarie and his wife stopped by what Macquarie called a spring. The place was later named Springwood: "Spring" from the springs in the area, and "wood" from the local Mountain Blue Gums (Eucalyptus deanei) of the area. As a town developed, the main street was named Macquarie Road, after Governor Macquarie.

The first railway line was put through the Blue Mountains in 1867, and the Springwood station was built in 1868. This station was replaced by a more substantial building in the Victorian Gothic style, constructed in 1884 under the direction of John Whitton, Chief Engineer of NSW Railways; a porter's cottage was constructed just west of the station. Springwood Station is the second-oldest surviving station in the Blue Mountains. It is listed on the (now defunct) Register of the National Estate as well as having a New South Wales heritage listing.

In 1892, James Hunter Lawson built Braemar, a large, single-storey house situated on a sixty-acre property on Macquarie Road. Braemar started as a family residence, but later became a convalescent home, a boarding house, a private home again and a guesthouse. It was acquired by the Blue Mountains City Council in 1974, restored as a Bicentennial project and reopened in 1988. It serves as a community gallery and centre, staffed by volunteers. The local library is housed in a new building behind Braemar.

Christ Church Anglican Church was built on the Great Western Highway from 1888 to 1889, with extensions in the 1960s and 1980s. It was designed by the architect Sir John Sulman, who had a holiday residence at Lawson. Designed in the Victorian Academic Gothic style, the church is the oldest Anglican church building in the Blue Mountains and is heritage-listed. The house originally built as a vicarage, but only used as a private residence known as Southall, is also heritage-listed. The Presbyterian Church building, a sandstone Gothic building located on Macquarie Road, was built in 1895. The Catholic community was originally part of the Penrith parish, but were given their own building in 1892: St Thomas Aquinas Church. The church has since relocated to St Columba's grounds, Winmalee.

== Heritage listings ==
Springwood has a number of heritage-listed sites, including:

- Blue Mountains National Park: Blue Mountains walking tracks
- 345–347 Great Western Highway: Christ Church Anglican Church, Springwood
- 39 Hawkesbury Road: Buckland Convalescent Home
- Main Western railway: Springwood railway station

=== October 2013 bushfires ===
A small part of Springwood, along with larger parts of the adjacent town of Winmalee and nearby village of Yellow Rock were badly affected by bushfires in October 2013. 193 residential properties were destroyed, and 109 damaged in those localities.

== Commercial area and transport ==
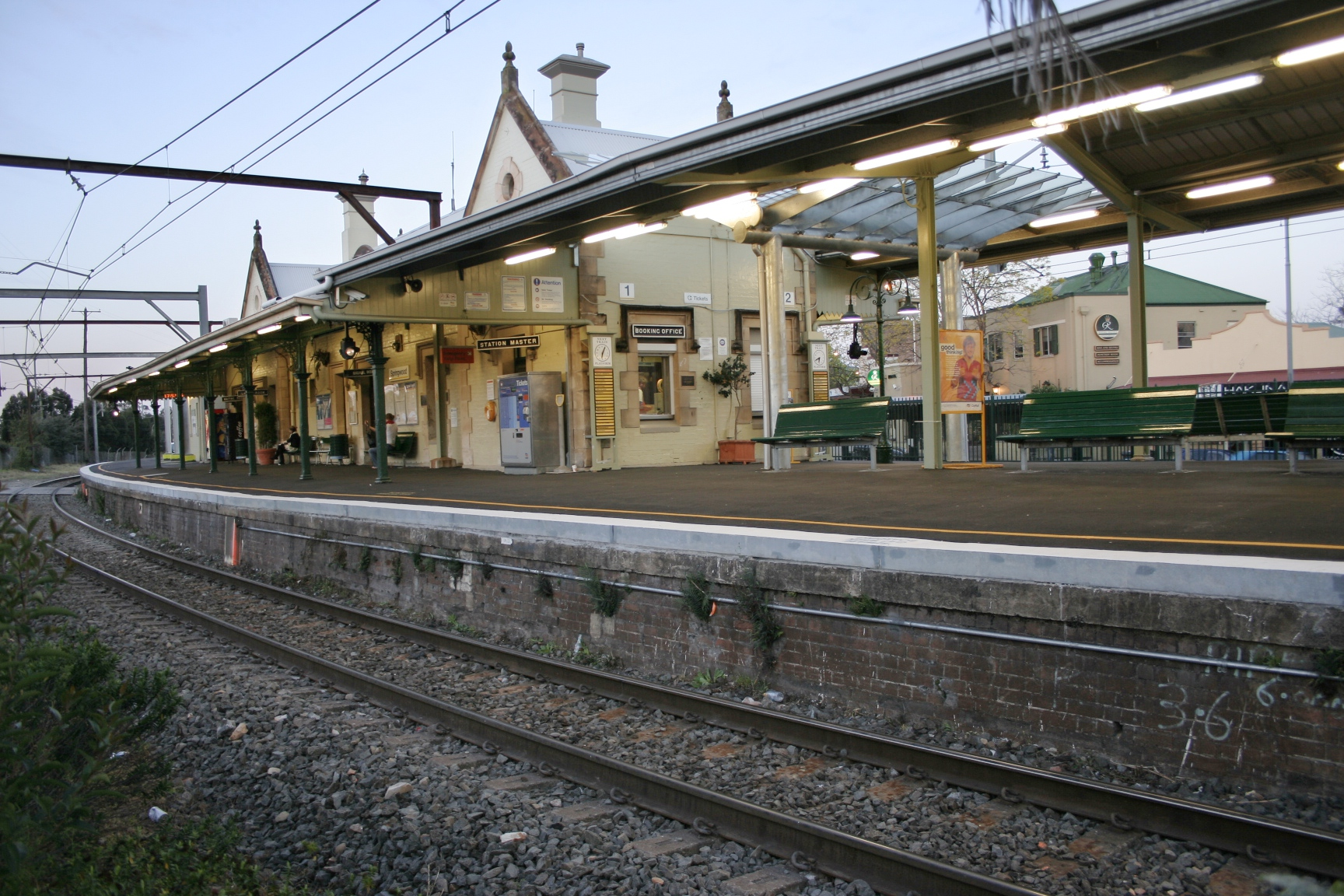
Springwood Station

Springwood's commercial area centres around Macquarie Road which runs parallel to the Great Western Highway and the railway line. The Springwood & District Chamber of Commerce represents retailers, businesses, services and not-for-profit organisations in Springwood and surrounding areas.

- Springwood railway station is on the Blue Mountains Line of the NSW TrainLink intercity network.
- Blue Mountains Transit provides daily bus services through Springwood from Penrith and Winmalee in addition to various bus routes from Springwood to Burns Road, Springwood Hospital, Hazelbrook, Katoomba and Yellow Rock.

== Education ==
The town is serviced by three high schools, Springwood High School, Winmalee High School and St. Columba's High School, as well as private and selective high schools in other suburbs. Springwood is also serviced by five primary schools: Ellison Public School, Faulconbridge Public School, Winmalee Public School, Springwood Public School and St Thomas Aquinas Primary School.

== Churches ==
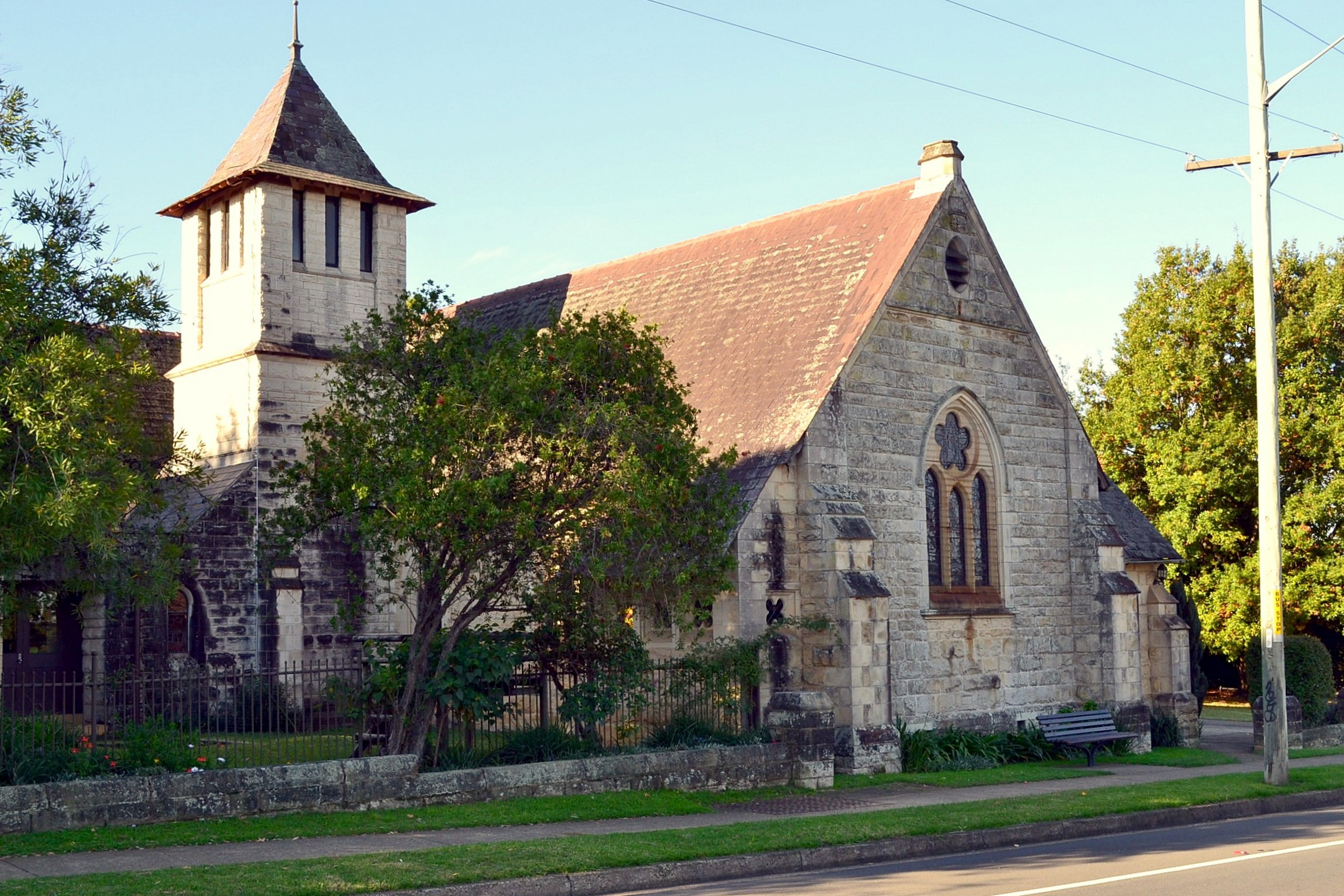
Christ Church Anglican Church, built 1888–89, tower built 1982

- Anglican Churches Springwood [The parish centres include Christ Church Anglican Church (1888) and the Factory (2004)]
- Springwood Baptist
- Springwood Presbyterian meeting at Frazer Presbyterian Church (1895)
- Springwood Salvation Army
- Springwood Uniting Church
- St. Thomas Aquinas Catholic Church
- Lutheran Springwood
- Strong Nation Churches (Blue Mountains)

== Climate ==
Springwood has a humid subtropical climate (Cfa). Unlike the upper Blue Mountains area, it generally has mild winters and warm summers, due in part to the foehn effect. Although Springwood's elevation is at 371 m (1,217 ft), its winter nights are warmer than those of Penrith and Richmond in the lower Sydney metropolitan area, which lie on the footsteps of the Blue Mountains. This is mainly because cool air from the mountains sinks to the Cumberland Plain, thus cooling these suburbs at night. Springwood has a higher annual rainfall amount than these nearby suburbs on the floodplain.

Furthermore, Springwood can suffer bushfire damage during the spring and summer months due to it being located in, and surrounded by, a predominant Eucalyptus woodland area which encompass the Blue Mountains region.

Climate data for Springwood (Valley Heights)
Month	Jan	Feb	Mar	Apr	May	Jun	Jul	Aug	Sep	Oct	Nov	Dec	Year
Record high °C (°F)	45.1 (113.2)	44.6 (112.3)	37.1 (98.8)	34.3 (93.7)	27.6 (81.7)	22.1 (71.8)	25.9 (78.6)	27.0 (80.6)	34.6 (94.3)	36.9 (98.4)	43.5 (110.3)	43.5 (110.3)	45.1 (113.2)
Mean daily maximum °C (°F)	28.9 (84.0)	26.8 (80.2)	25.1 (77.2)	22.4 (72.3)	19.4 (66.9)	16.1 (61.0)	16.3 (61.3)	17.8 (64.0)	21.3 (70.3)	23.8 (74.8)	25.8 (78.4)	27.1 (80.8)	22.6 (72.7)
Mean daily minimum °C (°F)	17.3 (63.1)	16.9 (62.4)	15.5 (59.9)	12.5 (54.5)	9.5 (49.1)	7.8 (46.0)	6.6 (43.9)	7.1 (44.8)	9.4 (48.9)	11.8 (53.2)	14.1 (57.4)	15.5 (59.9)	12.0 (53.6)
Record low °C (°F)	9.8 (49.6)	10.0 (50.0)	8.9 (48.0)	4.2 (39.6)	2.1 (35.8)	−0.3 (31.5)	−2.6 (27.3)	1.5 (34.7)	3.1 (37.6)	4.7 (40.5)	6.7 (44.1)	8.2 (46.8)	−2.6 (27.3)
Average precipitation mm (inches)	125.0 (4.92)	141.3 (5.56)	130.2 (5.13)	86.9 (3.42)	70.2 (2.76)	76.9 (3.03)	55.0 (2.17)	52.8 (2.08)	54.7 (2.15)	73.4 (2.89)	95.4 (3.76)	101.8 (4.01)	1,065.1 (41.93)
Average precipitation days	11.1	11.0	11.2	8.5	7.2	7.4	6.0	6.4	7.2	8.6	9.7	10.5	104.8
Source: Bureau of Meteorology (temperature records 2006–2021; rainfall records 1883–2021)

== Celebrations and events ==
The town's annual celebration, Springwood Spring Festival, occurs on the third Saturday in September .

Springwood is also the site of a notable Anzac Day Parade.

The Blue Mountains Vietnam Veterans' Association conducts the largest annual parade and Memorial Service for Vietnam veterans in Australasia at Springwood, on the third Sunday of August, to coincide with the anniversary of the Battle of Long Tan.

== Parks and recreation ==
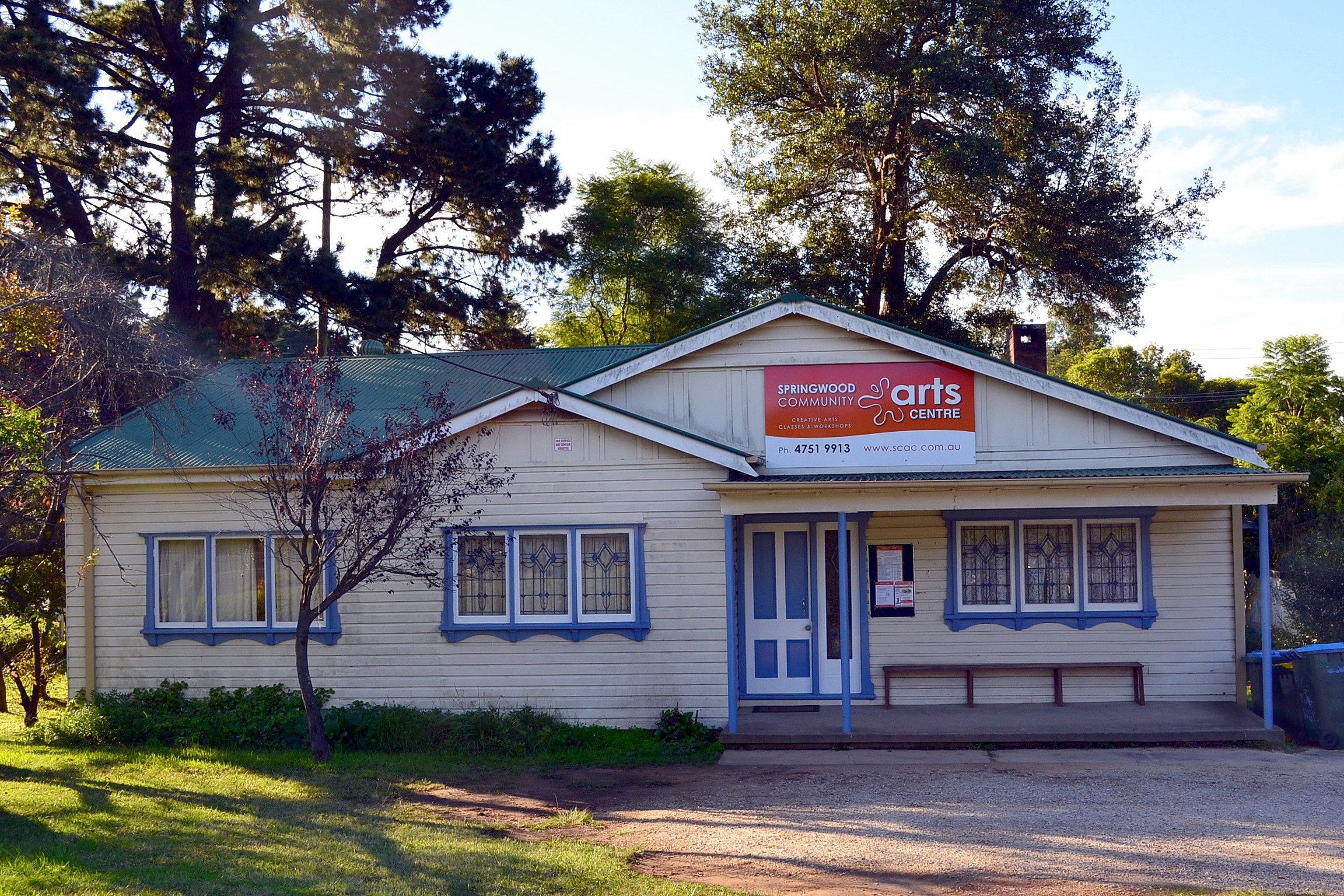
Community Arts Centre

Springwood has some parklands with bushwalks often leading into wilderness areas. Fairy Dell is located immediately south of the township and has some tracks leading into the Blue Mountains World Heritage area. The Deanei Reserve is another bushland area which is located east of the township and hosts the threatened and endangered Blue Mountains Shalecap Forest. There are also bushland walks in this bushland Reserve.

Buttenshaw Park is also a recreational area which hosts an arboretum, play structures and the Springwood Pool.

Further south from Springwood is the Sassafrass Gully Track, which is a loop track that follows Sassafrass Creek and Glenbrook Creek to the Perch Ponds. After that, the track follows Magdala Creek, back to Springwood.

Summerhayes Park is a public reserve located in Winmalee, which is used for sport and recreational activities. Its facilities include tennis and netball courts, a newly built skate park and fields for football (soccer). It is the home of Springwood United Football Club (formerly Springwood Soccer & Sports Club) and Springwood Netball Club. Summerhayes Park has diverse native flora and fauna and contains many threatened/endangered species and ecological communities. It is also a bushwalking area with many tracks, vistas and aboriginal archeological sites.

Braemar Gallery opened in 1988. It serves as a community gallery. The venue hosts different exhibitions each month, showcasing local and regional artists' works. Braemar House, where the gallery is situated in, is said to be beautiful and known to be historic.

== Population ==
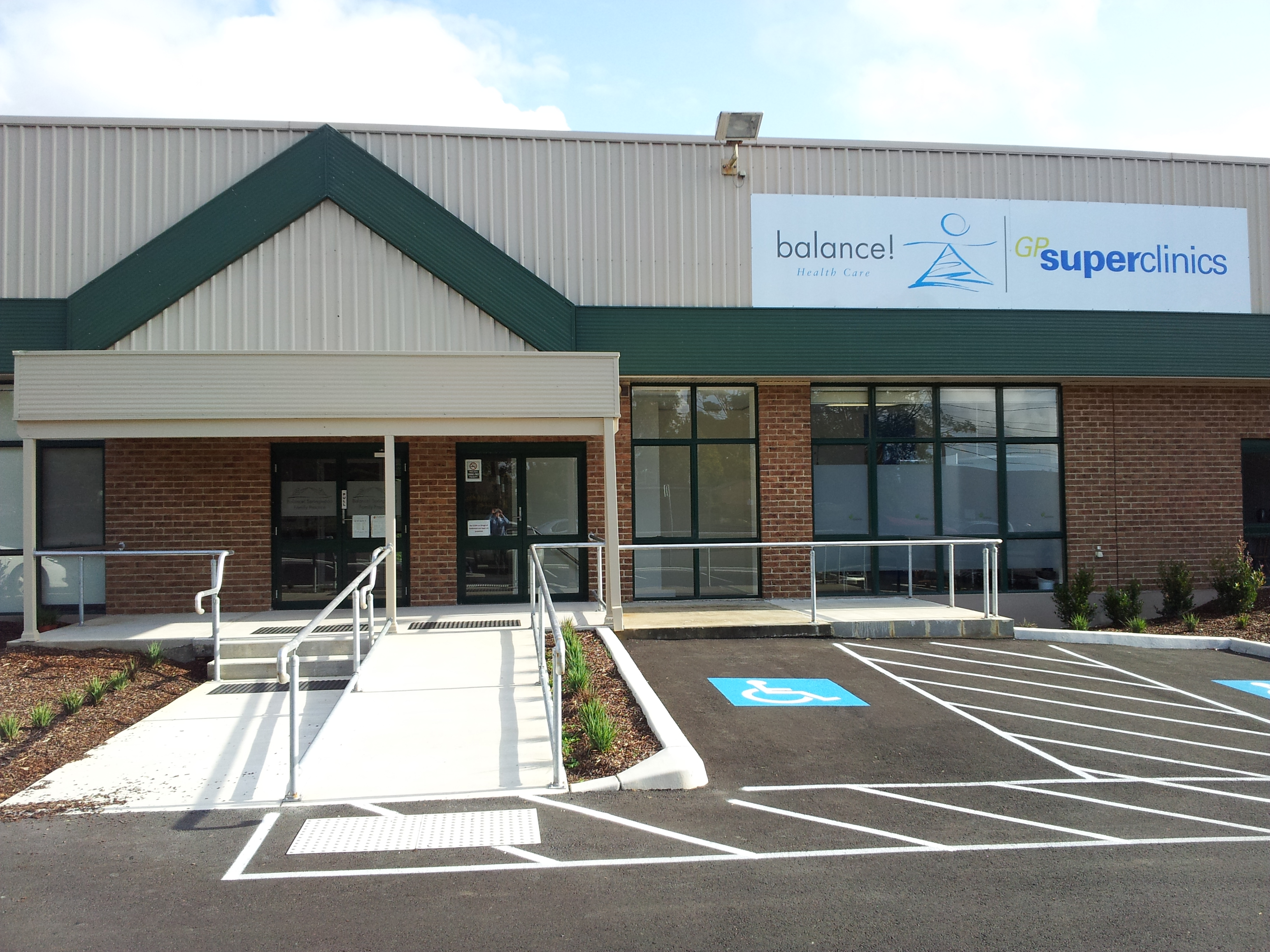
Springwood's GP Superclinic

Springwood is the largest town in the lower Blue Mountains. According to the 2016 Census, there were 8,475 people living in Springwood including 3,938 males (46.4%) and 4,540 females (53.6%). 79.7% of people were born in Australia. The next most common countries of birth were England 6.9% and New Zealand 1.5%. 91.5% of people only spoke English at home. The Aboriginal and Torres Strait Islander population of Springwood is 147 or 1.7% of the total population. The most common responses for religion were No Religion, so described 32.2%, Catholic 20.9% and Anglican 18.7%.

== Notable people ==
Notable people from or who have lived in Springwood include:

- Adam Giles, former Chief Minister of the Northern Territory (2013–2016)
- Gerry Harvey, entrepreneur
- Andrew Hinson, rugby league player
- Julia Jacklin, singer-songwriter
- Thomas Keneally, author
- Laurie Nichols, rugby league identity
- Amanda Spratt, professional cyclist
- Graham Toulmin AM, dental clinic philanthropist
- Wendy Toulmin AM, dental clinic philanthropist

== See also ==
- List of Blue Mountains subjects
