= Lismore High Campus =

Lismore High Campus (part of The Rivers Secondary College)

Location
- Dalley Street, East Lismore, Northern Rivers, New South Wales; Australia; 28°49′13″S 153°17′49″E

Information
- Type: Government-funded co-educational comprehensive secondary day school campus
- Motto: Latin: Spectemur Agendo (Let us be judged by our actions.)
- Established: January 1920; 106 years ago
- School district: Lismore; Regional North
- Educational authority: NSW Department of Education
- Principal: Chris Williams
- Teaching staff: 45.5 FTE (2022)
- Years: 7–12
- Enrolment: ~440 (2022)
- Campus type: Regional
- Colours: Gold and black
- Website: lismore-h.schools.nsw.gov.au

Lismore High Campus, part of The Rivers Secondary College, is a government-funded co-educational comprehensive secondary day school campus, located in East Lismore, in the Northern Rivers region of New South Wales, Australia.

Established in 1920 as Lismore High School, the campus enrolled approximately 440 students in 2022, from Year 7 to Year 12, of whom 17 percent identified as Indigenous Australians and eight percent were from a language background other than English. The school is operated by the NSW Department of Education; the principal is Chris Williams.

The Rivers Secondary College comprises the Richmond River High Campus, the Kadina High Campus, and the Lismore High Campus.

== History and description ==
=== First location ===
Previously known as Lismore High School (LHS), the school's first site was on Lake Street, North Lismore (the present Richmond River High Campus site). On 23 November 1918, the foundation stone was laid for the new high school building by the Member for Lismore, George Nesbitt. At the time of its establishment in January 1920, it was one of only five high schools outside the Sydney metropolitan area. (Note: The others were Maitland (1884), Grafton (1912), Goulburn (1913) and Wollongong (1917).) The school served the Richmond River area and until 1929 with the opening of Murwillumbah High School, was the only high school between Grafton and the Queensland border.

The Chinese-Australian journalist Vivian Chow Yung (Note: The naming protocol used is the European given name Vivian followed by the Chinese surname Chow followed by the Chinese given name Yung. Because of misunderstanding of Chinese naming protocols, the Chinese given name was often misused in official documents as a surname, and thus Vivian Chow is often referred to as Vivian Yung.) attended LHS in its beginning years. Told in 1923 by an Irish-Australian schoolteacher at LHS, "You are Australian now. Why worry so much about China? What does China mean to you?", Chow responded "Sir, you were born in Australia, but you are always telling us about Home Rule for Ireland. What does Ireland mean to you?" (Note: Chow is also frequently mentioned in Professor John Fitzgerald's Big White Lie: Chinese Australians and White Australia (2007) Sydney, UNSW Press.)

=== Second location ===
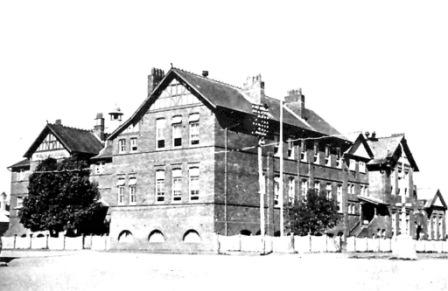
Lismore High main building on Keen and Magellan streets in the 1920s.

The second site of LHS was on Magellan Street in the city precinct. By 1957 LHS was one of the largest secondary schools in the state, with an enrolment of 1,438 students and a staff of 67 teachers. This represented the zenith of its enrolments as the establishment of other high schools took effect: Kyogle (1955), Mullumbimby (1955), Ballina (1956) and Richmond River (1958). The writer Bob Ellis attended LHS at this time. In a speech in May 1998, Ellis acknowledged the "selfless teachers I am proud to have known" and that "Lismore High gave us not only the intellectual armaments that made it possible for us to prevail in the great world beyond Lismore, but it also gave us a sense of that possibility".

=== Third location ===
By the late 1960s, the Magellan Street site of the school was proving to be too small for its requirements and in May 1969 LHS moved to its third site, a new complex in East Lismore. LHS, once the only high school in the district, is now one of three state, two Catholic and two Independent High Schools in Lismore. (Note: Richmond River High School in North Lismore opened in 1958, and Kadina High School in Goonellabah opened in 1977.) Enrolments are now relaxed at around 400 students.

The Magellan Street site has been used for educational purposes since 1882. It was originally a paddock when the Lismore Public School, established in 1867, moved there that year. The children were housed in school tents until in August 1885 they moved into a new brick building with stone foundations. From 1890 the school offered primary and secondary education, becoming the Lismore Superior School. In 1902, when the northern end of the 1885 building became unsafe, a three-storey brick building, with a covered play area on the ground floor, was built and occupied by the Girls' Department in August 1903.

Not long afterwards, most of the remaining 1885 building was demolished. The Boys' Department of the Lismore District School was housed in a temporary wooden building until December 1911, when it moved into a two-storey brick extension at the Keen and Magellan Streets corner. During the 1920s and 1930s allotments were acquired progressively until the whole area bounded by Keen, Magellan and Dawson Streets was available for school purposes, now home to Lismore Public School and Lismore High School. In February 1931 a third building opened. In 1942 Lismore Public School moved to a new complex and the vacated buildings were taken over by LHS.

With the shift of LHS to the East Lismore site, the new Lismore Teachers' College opened in the Magellan Street site, which became from 1971 the Northern Rivers College of Advanced Education, which also housed the Northern Rivers Conservatorium Arts Centre. The college moved later to the north of the new East Lismore site to become the Lismore Campus of Southern Cross University.

The 1902 school buildings on Keen Street continue to house the Northern Rivers Conservatorium Arts Centre today while various other buildings were demolished. The 1931 building on Magellan Street was retained and in 2003 became home to the Lismore City Library and various other community services.

== Notable alumni ==
- Peter Arnison AC, CVO – Major General, Land Commander Australia 1994–1996, Governor of Queensland 1997–2003
- Bruce Duncan – first ex-student to become Member for Lismore (1965–1988) in the New South Wales Legislative Assembly
- Bob Ellis – writer, journalist and political commentator
- Paul Hockings – author, editor, filmmaker, and Professor of Anthropology at the University of Illinois
- Roy Masters AM – football coach
- Pat Morton – former politician; leader of the NSW Opposition (1955–1959) and Askin Cabinet Minister
- John Niland AC – former Vice Chancellor of the University of New South Wales 1992–2002
- Frank Oakes – first ex-student to become Mayor of Lismore. Oakes Oval in Lismore is named after him.
- Bill Rixon – politician; Member of NSW Parliament for Lismore (1988–1999)
- James Strong, businessman
- Douglas G. Stuart – Regents' Professor Emeritus of Physiology, University of Arizona
- Harry Wharton OBE, FAA – zoologist and entomologist, particularly for the CSIRO

== See also ==
- List of government schools in New South Wales
- Education in Australia
