= St Thomas Aquinas Church, Springwood =

St Thomas Aquinas Church
- Location in New South Wales
- 33°40′54″S 150°35′22″E
- Location: Hawkesbury Road, Springwood, New South Wales
- Country: Australia
- Denomination: Roman Catholic
- Website: stachurchspringwood.org.au

History
- Status: Church
- Founded: 1892
- Founder: Thomas Boland
- Dedication: Thomas Aquinas

Architecture
- Functional status: Active
- Years built: 1892–1996

Administration
- Diocese: Parramatta
- Parish: St Thomas Aquinas, Springwood

Clergy
- Priest: Fr Paul Slyney

St Thomas Aquinas Church is a Roman Catholic church building located in Springwood, New South Wales, Australia. The church shares its grounds with the St Thomas Aquinas Primary School.

== History ==
Whilst no physical building stood then, the Catholic Church at Springwood dates back to 1839, when it was part of the Penrith parish. At this time, Mass was offered by Fr. Charles Sumner at the Springwood Inn owned by Thomas Boland, and later offered at the Boland family home. During the period from 1890 to 1907 the church became a part of the Blue Mountains parish, under the parish priest Fr. James McGough.

In 1892 the church was given a building of its own thanks to donations of land and money by the Boland family. This was the first church of St Thomas Aquinas (Springwood), and was located at what is now Rest Park, on Macquarie Road.

The church later relocated to Hawkesbury Road, to what is now the site of a retirement villa, Aquinas Court. In 1920 a primary school was opened in the old church building. In November 1981 the first stage of the new St Thomas Aquinas Primary School opened at its current site within the St Columba's grounds, Hawkesbury Road. In 1986 the church relocated again, this time to the former seminary, and current co-educational St Columba's Catholic College site.

In February 1996, the current St Thomas Aquinas Catholic Church opened within the grounds of the St Thomas Aquinas Primary School, on Hawkesbury Road, Springwood.

== Priests past and present ==
- Fr. Charles Sumner
- Fr. James McGough
- Fr. James Sheridan
- Fr. P. C. Cregan
- Fr. Daniel Galvin (first resident priest)
- Fr. Thomas Leen
- Fr. Canavan
- Fr. Leslie Bagot
- Fr. James O'Meara
- Fr. Michael McGloin
- Fr. Renato Paras
- Fr. Peter Connelly
- Fr. Alan Layt
- Fr. Edward Tyler
- Fr. Paul Slyney

== St Thomas Aquinas Primary School ==
The school opened in 1921 on the corner of Macquarie Road and Hawkesbury Road with 24 students. The school consisted of one building, the old church. At the time the school was staffed by Sisters Kevin and Catherine, and continued to be staffed by the Sisters of St Joseph until the late 1970s - early 1980s. In September 1939 a new school building was opened by Monsignor Phelan in the same location. In June 1962, with an enrolment of 187 students, an ]other school building was opened by Cardinal Gilroy. In 1969 a second storey was added to the 1939 building. In 1981–82 the school relocated to its current site on Hawkesbury Road.

The school serves the communities of Springwood, Faulconbridge, Hawkesbury Heights, Valley Heights, Warrimoo, Winmalee, and Yellow Rock.

The school's motto is: Love One Another. The school principal is currently Marina Hardy.
