= James Strong (Australian businessman) =

Australian businessman and philanthropist

James Strong AO
- Born: James Alexander Strong; 31 July 1944; Lismore, New South Wales, Australia
- Died: 3 March 2013 (aged 68); North Sydney, New South Wales, Australia
- Education: Lismore High School; Tenterfield High School
- Alma mater: University of Queensland; University of Sydney
- Occupation: Chief executive

James Alexander Strong AO (31 July 1944 – 3 March 2013) was an Australian businessman and philanthropist.

== Education ==
Born in Lismore, New South Wales, Strong was educated at Lismore High School and Tenterfield High School. At the age of 16, he was selected from 6,000 applicants to undertake officer training at the Royal Military College, Duntroon; however, he dropped out during his fourth year, realising that he was not suited to the military. He then completed tertiary studies at the University of Queensland and the University of Sydney. He qualified as a barrister, and was admitted to the New South Wales Bar Association in 1976.

== Professional and business career ==
Strong entered the business world as a site manager for the mining company Nabalco in 1981, and in 1983 was an executive director of the Australian Mining Council. From 1986 to 1989, he was CEO of Australian Airlines (formerly TAA)—it was during a round of media interviews for the airline that he first donned the distinctive bow tie he would become known for wearing. In 1991, he became national chairman of partners for the law firm Corrs Chambers Westgarth, and in 1992, managing director of the DB Breweries Group in New Zealand.

Strong was chief executive and managing director of Qantas from 1993 until 2001, during the time of its merger with his former airline, Australian Airlines. He was appointed to the board of Qantas several years after his departure as CEO. He also held senior roles with several other Australian companies, including: the Woolworths conglomerate, Rip Curl, IAG and Kathmandu.

From 2006 to 2012, Strong was chairman of the Australia Council for the Arts. He also served as chairman of several other arts organisations, including the Sydney Theatre Company, the Australian Brandenburg Orchestra, the Australia Business Arts Foundation and the State Library of Victoria. As a director of Opera Australia, he chaired a 2005 review into orchestra funding.

Strong was also involved in sports administration: he was a director of Dorna Sports, which administers MotoGP motorcycle racing; was a member of the Australian Grand Prix Corporation; and at the time of his death was non-executive chairman of V8 Supercars and chairman of the Australian and New Zealand organising committee for the 2015 Cricket World Cup.

In 2001 he was awarded the Centenary Medal. He was appointed an Officer of the Order of Australia (AO) for services to business and commerce, particularly in aviation, insurance and retail fields, and to the arts as an administrator and philanthropist, in the 2006 Australia Day Honours.

== Personal ==
Strong is succeeded by his two sons, Nicholas and Samuel.

He died at the Mater Hospital in North Sydney on 3 March 2013, following complications from surgery and pulmonary fibrosis, the latter having been diagnosed some 16 months earlier.

Business positions
Preceded by John Ward	CEO of Qantas; 1993–2001	Succeeded by Geoff Dixon
