= Vivian Chow Yung =

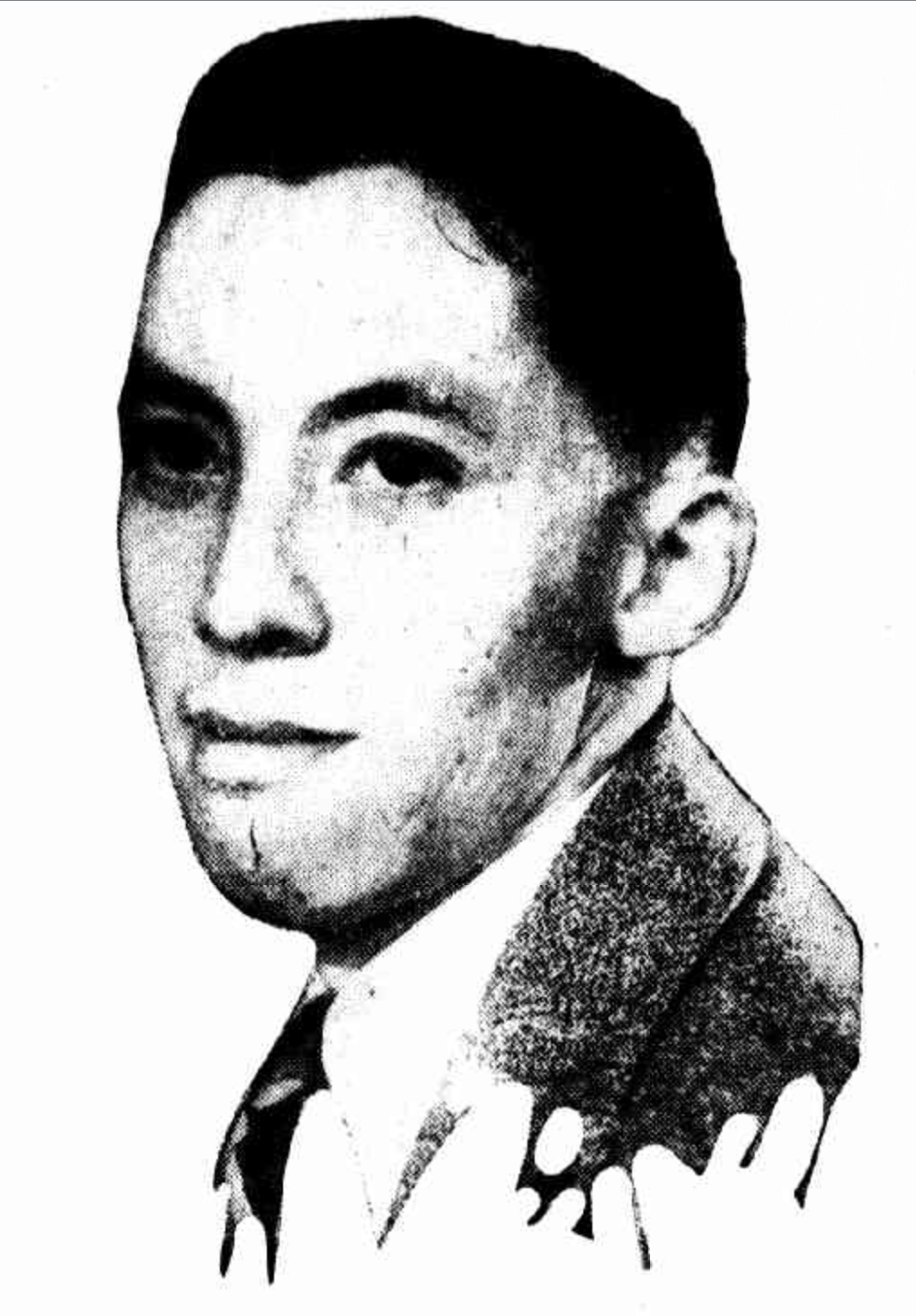
Vivian Chow Yung

Vivian Yung Chow (Chinese: 周成貴; pinyin: Zhou Chenggui; 1906–1941) was a Chinese-Australian journalist, who has been called "one of the key newspaper editors in China in the 1930s."

Chow co-founded the United China Magazine, and wrote extensively on the Chinese Masonic network, and on contemporary Chinese revolutionaries, such as Loong Hung Pung and Sun Yat-sen.

== Early life and career ==
Chow was born and raised in Lismore, New South Wales, Australia. His parents were Jessie Mary King and Chow Toong Yung (sometimes spelt Foon or Foong Yung), and his maternal grandparents were the Grafton storekeeper King Jung Sao (also known as Stephen King), and Annie Lavinia Lavett (a great-granddaughter of James Squire). He enjoyed close family connections with the Hung League: he would later claim his grandfather, Stephen King was the Grand Master of a Chinese revolutionary lodge in Australia. King was reputedly the leader of the Tung Meng Whui, “familiarly known to Australians as the Chinese Masonic Society”, as well as “the best Chinese detective ever connected with Scotland Yard”, who worked on cases in New York and the British Raj. Vivian's father, who was influenced by King in the towns of Grafton and Casino, was a native of Chin Mei village in Doong Goong County. Although surnamed Chow (Zhou), he and his descendants were entered on official records under the surname of Yung.

Chow attended Lismore High School. In 1923, he was told by an Irish-Australian schoolteacher there, “You are Australian now. Why worry so much about China? What does China mean to you?", Chow responded, “Sir, you were born in Australia, so was I. Your father came to this country as a pioneer, likewise my father. May I give the retort, courteous sir, and say to you: ‘why are you so proud of being Irish? Why is it that you storm and agitate about home rule in Ireland, and what does Ireland mean to you anyway?’”

At age 15, Chow became a cartoonist for the Richmond River Free Press. His older brother Luther worked as a journalist for the Northern Star. After graduating from high school Chow moved to Sydney, Australia. Then, in September 1925 the two brothers sailed for China, where Luther went to work as a proofreader with the North China Daily News in Shanghai. Vivian Chow travelled through China, Japan and revolutionary Russia, before finally settling in Shanghai.

By 1932, Chow had held positions such as foreign affairs editor for the Shanghai evening newspaper Sin Wan Pao (Xinwenbao) and co-editor of United China Magazine During his term as editor, United China came to be known for its anti-Japanese editorials and stubborn opposition to the Chinese Nationalist government. He also toured New South Wales, claiming the title, "‘Official historian of the Chinese Masonic Lodge and Revolutionary and Independence Association of Australian Chinese". He argued that Sun Yat-sen was "really a mild diversion in the great record of the Chinese revolution," that Tse Tsan-tai was "more a truly the father of modern Chinese republicanism than Sun could ever be" and that the 1911 Chinese Revolution was a result of the philosophy originated by his grandfather's "Revolutionary and Independence Party of the Australian Chinese" back in 1850.

Chow was unafraid to voice his political opinions, and was often outspoken. In 1932, he remarked, “Send a Chinese to America and he tries to become a monopolist because of the ambitious example set before him. Send him to British Singapore and he strives to become a contractor with designs on knighthood... Send a Chinese to Australia, he becomes a labor leader and a booster 'for the working man's paradise'”.

Also in 1932 Vivian Chow edited a collection of short stories with the title of his contribution, "What Happened to Riley", in which a confrontation between a British spy and a Chinese army intelligence officer is actually between two Australian-born men. The Chinese Australian denounces the racism of Australia and kills the British-descended Australian in a duel. The main character also declares: “The world wants only one sort of Chinese. A humble, meek, ignorant fellow, soaked with opium and mad upon gambling. A clean-minded, clean-bodied, active-brained Chinese spells the doom of a white world dominion. And that, the white men have been clever enough to realise."

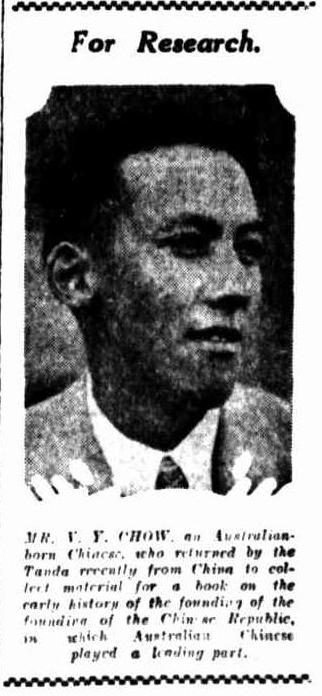
Vivian Young Chow in 1932.

Chow continued to promote the legend of Loong Hung Pung, the Chinese-Australian revolutionary, throughout his life. In the words of historian John Fitzgerald, "he wanted Australians to embrace the story of Loong Hung Pung as an Australian legend, not a remote and exotic Chinese one." Chow believed that nationalist spies were tailing him in Sydney, on his travels north to Grafton and to his home town of Lismore, and that senior officers in the Sydney consulate were hounding him during his time in Sydney. In 1932, China's consul-general unsuccessfully petitioned the Commonwealth government to have Chow arrested and deported. Chow was deeply offended: "Even if I were a Communist practical and theoretical," he reflected, "the Commonwealth of Australia has no power to deport from the country a native born son." Later, in 1935 when he returned to Australia again after briefly travelling to Shanghai, he wrote an article claiming the Chinese government had sentenced to death two journalists in Shanghai who had criticized it, provoking the consul-general to complain to the Australian Prime Minister Lyons that Chow was "sheltering behind his Australian domicile in attacking my Government", and ask "his advice as to what redress I have against an offender who makes such false and damaging statements against the highest official of my Government – Marshal Chiang Kai Shek." It is unknown if Lyons replied, and once again Chow was saved from prosecution in Australia and possibly execution in China by his Australian heritage.

Chow left a controversial legacy. Historian and biographer John Fitzgerald, who wrote on Chow, condemned many of his claims as "self-serving and tendentious", but acknowledged that "Vivian Chow’s reflections reveal a young man proud of his... heritage and with an acute interest in what it meant to be counted Australian in the era of White Australia. Even though, for the most part, his Australian identity was a source of pride, still, he was painfully conscious of the limitations that White Australia placed upon his freedom of expression – not freedom of political expression in this case, but freedom to express his sense of pride in being an Australian of Chinese heritage."

Chow died of natural causes in 1941, at the age 35.
