= Kadina High Campus =

Kadina High Campus (part of The Rivers Secondary College)

Location
- Kadina Street, Goonellabah, Northern Rivers, New South Wales; Australia; 28°49′04″S 153°20′19″E

Information
- Type: Government-funded co-educational comprehensive secondary day school campus
- Motto: Success with Honour
- Established: 1976; 50 years ago (as Kadina High School)
- School district: Lismore; Regional North
- Educational authority: NSW Department of Education
- Principal: James Witchard
- Teaching staff: 47.2 FTE (2022)
- Years: 7–12
- Enrolment: ~310 (2022)
- Campus type: Regional
- Colours: Bottle green, black and white
- Newspaper: Kadina News
- Website: kadina-h.schools.nsw.gov.au

Kadina High Campus, part of The Rivers Secondary College, is a government-funded co-educational comprehensive secondary day school campus, located in Goonellabah, a suburb of Lismore, in the Northern Rivers region of New South Wales, Australia.

Established in 1976 as Kadina High School, the campus enrolled approximately 310 students in 2022, from Year 7 to Year 12, of whom 35 percent identified as Indigenous Australians and seven percent were from a language background other than English. The school is operated by the NSW Department of Education; the principal is James Witchard.

The Rivers Secondary College comprises the Richmond River High Campus, the Kadina High Campus, and the Lismore High Campus.

== Notable alumni ==
- Craig Foster – former soccer player and sports journalist; human rights and refugee ambassador
- Paul Foster – former soccer player
- Adam Gilchrist AM – former cricket player; now sports journalist
- Adam Hughes – former soccer player
- Ngaire Joseph – singer and songwriter
- David Mead – rugby league football player
- Taya Smith-Gaukrodger – singer/worship leader for Hillsong United
- Emma Tom – author and journalist
- Darren Williams – author

== See also ==
- List of government schools in New South Wales
- Education in Australia
