= Tulloona =

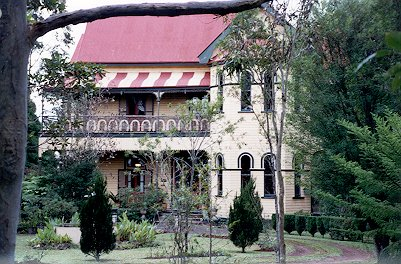
- Front elevation

- Location within New South Wales Location within Australia
- 28.8154°S 153.3187°E
- Location: 562 Ballina Road, Goonellabah, City of Lismore, New South Wales, Australia

History
- Built: 1895–1896

New South Wales Heritage Register
- Official name: Tulloona; Northcott House; St Peter's Anglican Church
- Type: state heritage (built)
- Designated: 2 April 1999
- Reference no.: 51
- Type: House
- Category: Residential buildings (private)

Tulloona is a heritage-listed residence at 562 Ballina Road, Goonellabah, City of Lismore, New South Wales, Australia. It was built from 1895 to 1896. It has also been known as Northcott House and St Peter's Anglican Church. It was added to the New South Wales State Heritage Register on 2 April 1999.

== History ==
Thomas McGregor was the owner of the land in 1872. He erected a hut and set about preparing the site for a residence.

William and Jessie Northcott arrived in Lismore in 1879 and bought businesses and had a saddlery business in the already developed town. The expanding Northcott family lived above their "Trading Palace" in Molesworth Street, Lismore. He later purchased a farm of several hundred acres at Goonellabah. Tulloona House was built in 1895 for the Northcott family. William Northcott set out to establish an "English Park" setting and sited Tulloona on 4 acres at the highest point with wonderful views in all directions. The builder was Mr Brown, father of the late George Brown of Brown & Jolly.

A schoolroom was built behind the house. All the buildings were painted white. An acetylene and generating plant supplied the lighting for the house and buildings.

A two thousand gallon tank was erected between the house and the schoolroom, and the water was pumped to the tank by a windmill, erected beside a twenty eight feet deep, eighteen feet in diameter well. The water was piped to every part of the property, including pipes for hundreds of yards to the house, dairy and piggery on the farm on the northern end of the property overlooking Bexhill.

Stables for 4 horses was built at the back of the 4 acre property, together with the carriage house for 2 buggies, a sulky and a "sociable", which held 9 people (3 in the front and 6 in the back with seats facing each other). The sulky was for the use of the staff on their days off. William Northcott drove to Lismore each day in the smaller buggy, which he called the phaeton. On Sundays he drove his family to Church in the "sociable" with 2 matching grey horses. This outfit was always made available when anyone of note came to Lismore, and the 2 horses, Beauchamp and Carrington, showed their paces on these important occasions. On their outings to Ballina, a 3rd horse Prince was harnessed with them. All members of the family were competent both as drivers and riders.

In 1910 the family purchased their first car, a Model T Ford. They all learned to drive except William who loved to drive his horses, and after his first attempt was content to be a passenger.

The house and high tank stand was a well known landmark and was a tourist attraction and could be seen from Casino and Dunoon. The walls could also be seen from Bangalow and Byron Bay lighthouse with binoculars.

Three maids were employed in the house and always wore uniforms, caps and aprons. Two men were employed outside.

In 1915 the family moved to Sydney and sold Tulloona to Dr Cahill.

In 1961 the Anglican Church bought the property as new premises for St Peter's Anglican Church. The lower floor was converted into a chapel, while the upper floor served as a residence for the curate. In 1978 the Anglican Church advertised for demolition tenders for the house to sell as building materials. That same year an Interim Conservation Order was placed on Tulloona to prevent demolition.

In 1980 Tulloona was purchased by a Mr Randall. He applied successfully to the Heritage Assistance Program for funding to conserve Tulloona. Conservation and restoration work was undertaken in the following years.

In 1981 a Permanent Conservation Order was placed on Tulloona.

The Heritage Council awarded $2,500 to the owners to contribute to a Conservation Management Plan which was produced in August 2005.

It was subsequently sold by long-term owners Sue and Michael Dakin c. 2012 after having comprehensively restored the property.

== Description ==
Tulloona was a farm originally comprising several hundred acres, with dairy and piggery on the northern end of the property overlooking Bexhill.

Tulloona house is sited towards the centre of a 3788m2 block adjacent to the junction of Ballina Road, Rous Road and the Bruxner Highway.

Significant plantings along the front boundary and within the articulation zone obscure views to Tullonna House from the street. Large trees, planted along the eastern boundary punctuate views from the residence to No. 564 and 566 Ballina Road.

The land contains a circular drive and garden to the front, an early school house to the rear and a scattering of subtropical trees.

=== House ===
A large scale house displaying all the exuberance of a high Victorian residence befitting that of a successful country gentleman. The house is a two-storey verandahed structure of local timber with weatherboard sheeting. The plan is basically a square with projecting bays to the main rooms. These bay windows contain rather distinctive shaped fenestration recalling the English Gothic-Revival. The galvanised steel verandah roofs have a distinctive ogee shape and the wide verandahs possess deep pointed timber valence boards with cast iron columns, panels and frieze which impart an air of lightness contrasting with the solid massing of the bays.

The house interior is lined with horizontal beaded timber boards throughout which were originally stained.

The major rooms are grand in scale (up to 10m by 9m) with the generous ceiling height of 4.8m throughout. All these rooms contain rich Victorian marble mantelpieces to the fireplaces with pattern inlays to sides and hearth. The central staircase is of impressive proportions with cedar balustrade and panelling surrounds reflecting a taste for "Old English" detailing (National Trust of Australia (NSW), 1978).

=== Garden ===
An "English Park" setting with the house on 4 acres set at the highest point of the farm with views in all directions.

The house and high tank stand was a well known landmark and was a tourist attraction and could be seen from Casino and Dunoon. The walls could also be seen from Bangalow and Byron Bay lighthouse with binoculars.

In the rear yard small garden beds are clustered around the School House, pool, and Residence.

=== Outbuildings and structures ===
Schoolroom

A schoolroom was built behind (north of) the house.

Generating Plant

An acetylene and generating plant supplied the lighting for the house and buildings.

Water Tank, Windmill and Well

A two thousand gallon tank was erected between house and schoolroom, and water pumped to the tank by a windmill, erected beside a twenty eight feet deep, eighteen feet in diameter well. The water was piped to every part of the property, including pipes for hundreds of yards to the house, dairy and piggery on the farm on the northern end of the property overlooking Bexhill.

Stables

Stables for 4 horses were built at the back of the 4 acre property, together with the

Carriage House

Carriage house for 2 buggies, a sulky and a "sociable", which held 9 people.

Tank Stand

The condition of Tulloona was reported as good as at 27 May 1998.

== Heritage listing ==
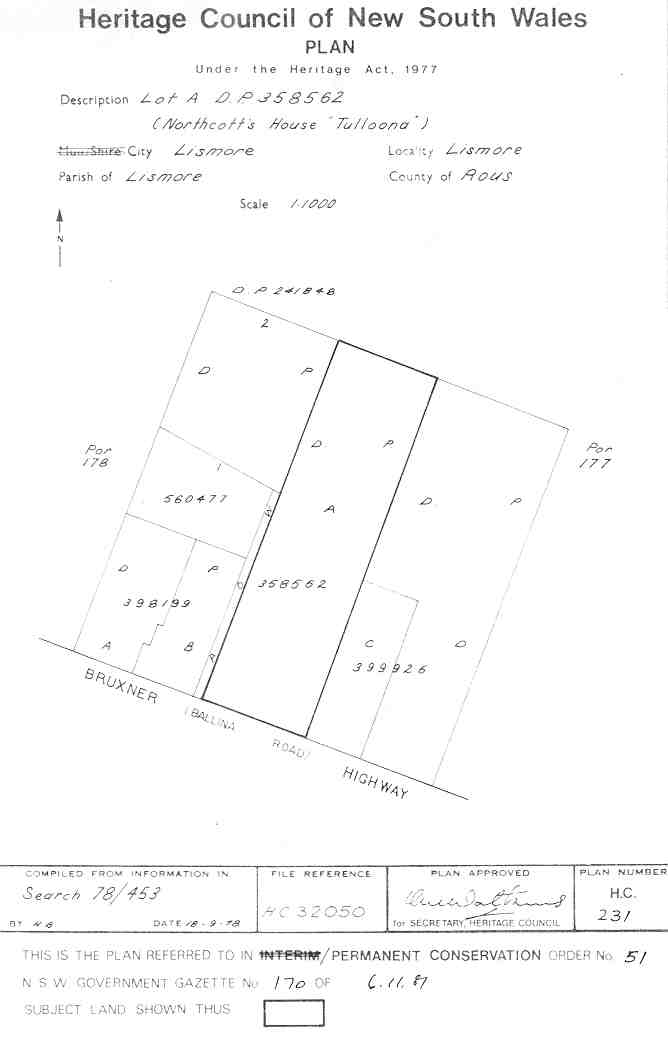
Heritage boundaries

A rare surviving house from the late Victorian period. One of the oldest known residences in the Lismore urban area. Tulloona is a fine example of a two-storey weatherboard house. It displays a high degree of integrity, and features design elements that exemplify opulent Victorian taste. Associated with a well-known local family. Originally built on a large rural holding at Goonellabah, then a separate village. Considerable social and historical interest for its many owners and uses over the years.

Tulloona was listed on the New South Wales State Heritage Register on 2 April 1999.
