= Richmond River High Campus =

Richmond River High Campus (part of The Rivers Secondary College)

Location
- Lake Street, North Lismore, Northern Rivers, New South Wales; Australia; 28°47′56″S 153°16′42″E

Information
- Type: Government-funded co-educational comprehensive secondary day school campus
- Motto: Knowledge is life
- Established: 1958; 68 years ago (as Richmond River High School)
- Closed: 2022
- School district: Lismore; Regional North
- Educational authority: NSW Department of Education
- Principal: Luke Woodward
- Teaching staff: 56.0 FTE (2022)
- Years: 7–12
- Enrolment: ~620 (2022)
- Area: 26 hectares (64 acres)
- Campus type: Regional
- Colours: Black, red, white and grey
- Website: richmondri-h.schools.nsw.gov.au

Richmond River High Campus, formerly known as Richmond River High School, was an Australian secondary school located in North Lismore, in the Northern Rivers region of New South Wales. It was a dual-campus government-funded co-educational comprehensive secondary day school, and part of The Rivers Secondary College.

== History ==
Established in 1958 as Richmond River High School, the campus enrolled approximately 620 students in 2022, from Year 7 to Year 12, of whom 14 percent identified as Indigenous Australians and eight percent from a language background other than English.

On 28 February 2022, Lismore experienced the worst flooding on record, which caused Richmond River High School to be left completely abandoned.

In June 2024, the New South Wales Government announced that the school would be rebuilt along Dunoon Road, in a more flood-resilient location.

On 28 March 2025, the historic but now-abandoned campus at 118B Dalley St, East Lismore was destroyed by fire. The building had been established in 1920 when Lismore High School opened before it moved to Keen Street in 1942, well before Richmond River High School was established at the old Lismore High School site in 1958. No one was injured, and authorities are currently investigating the cause of the fire.

The school was operated by the NSW Department of Education; the principal is Luke Woodward.

== Overview ==
The campus had a split-site campus, featuring sporting grounds and agricultural plots that when combined with the rest of the grounds, cover over 26 hectares (64 acres). It also is commonly affected by floods.

The mission statement of the campus is "A Caring School of Excellence"; and the campus motto is "Knowledge is life".

The Rivers Secondary College comprises the Richmond River High Campus, the Kadina High Campus, and the Lismore High Campus.

== Notable alumni ==
- Rhoda Roberts, actress and theatre director

== See also ==
- List of government schools in New South Wales (Q–S)
- Education in Australia
