= Christ Church Anglican Church, Springwood =

Christ Church Anglican Church
- Christ Church of England
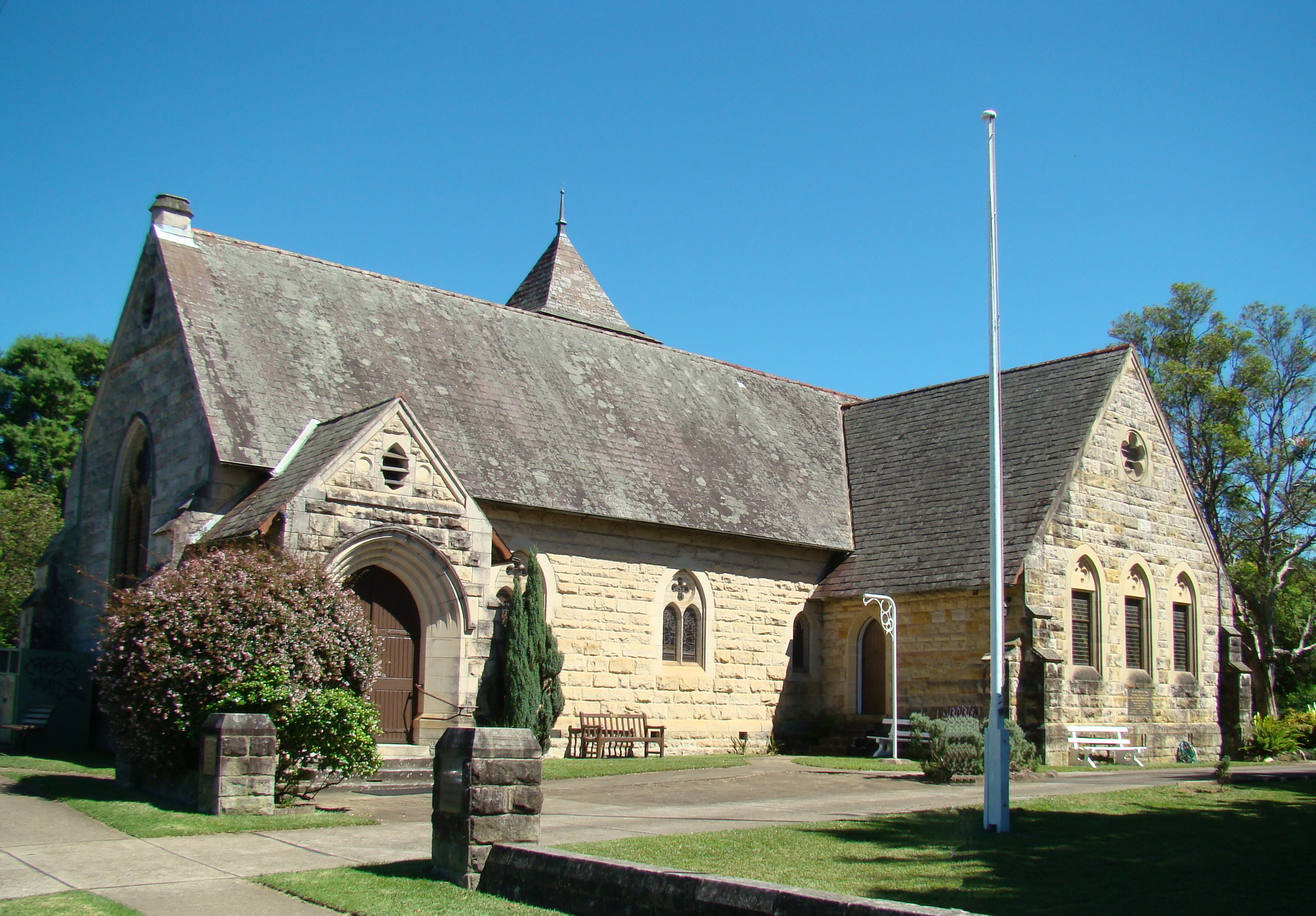
- Christ Church, pictured in 2007.
- Christ Church Anglican Church
- 33°41′58″S 150°33′22″E
- Location: 345–347 Great Western Highway, Springwood, City of Blue Mountains, New South Wales
- Country: Australia
- Denomination: Anglican
- Website: springwoodanglican.org.au

History
- Status: Church

Architecture
- Functional status: Complete
- Architect: Sir John Sulman
- Architectural type: Victorian Academic Gothic
- Years built: 1888–1889

Specifications
- Materials: Sandstone; slate

Administration
- Diocese: Sydney
- Parish: Anglican Churches Springwood

New South Wales Heritage Register
- Official name: Christ Church Anglican Church; Christ Church of England; Springwood
- Type: State heritage (complex / group)
- Designated: 2 April 1999
- Reference no.: 130
- Type: Church
- Category: Religion

The Christ Church Anglican Church is a heritage-listed Anglican church located at 345–347 Great Western Highway, Springwood, City of Blue Mountains, New South Wales, Australia. It was designed by Sir John Sulman and built from 1888 to 1889. It is also known as Christ Church of England and Springwood. The property is owned by Springwood Anglican Parish. It was added to the New South Wales State Heritage Register on 2 April 1999.

== History ==
The church was designed by Sir John Sulman, who worked in Australia from 1885 and who had a nearby holiday residence in Lawson. The major part of his practice was in commercial, institutional and ecclesiastical areas and he was responsible for more than ninety churches in England prior to his migration to New South Wales.

It was built from 1888-9. The main slate roof is an important part of the aesthetic quality of the building and together with the prominent tower has high visibility from the Great Western Highway.

Sulman's original conception as seen from his drawings, was never completed. This included a western and eastern transept at the rear of the church and a massive crowning tower between the two.

In 1961 the church added the eastern transept, according to the original plans. This was erected in stone with considerable sensitivity.

The growth of the church and its adjacent complex over a century has been significant evidence of the social role Christchurch has continued to play in the local Anglican community.

Additions and alterations to the place were made in the 1980s.

== Description ==
The building is a fine sandstone church with a simple but sensitively designed interior. It forms part of a group of buildings which includes a separate dwelling, "Southall" to the west of the property and a fine stand of trees between the two. The roof is slate and the sandstone is local.

It is a fine example of a Victorian Academic Gothic style church with high quality sandstone detailing and a prominent slate pitched roof to the main body of the church and the tower.

=== Condition ===
As at 5 January 2011, sections of the slate roof require careful removal and rehanging, as the nails holding the slates have corroded and need replacement. The tower roof, valleys, ridges and loose slates are the most urgent. A recent insurance inspection report gave the church an excellent report (2011 grant application).

=== Modifications and dates ===
- 1961 – added the eastern transept, according to the original plans
- 1980s – additions and alterations.
- 2010 – $9,000 currently being spent on replacing wiring in the church. A few damaged roof tiles were repaired – supporting nails have corroded/need replacement (grant application)
- 2013–2014 – $30,000 spent replacing slate on tower, since original slate had rusted and was unsafe

== Heritage listing ==
As at 15 December 2005, Christ Church Springwood is a fine example of a Victorian Academic Gothic style church featuring high quality sandstone detailing. Extensions to the church to create the chancel, north transept and tower are in keeping with Sulman's original design. The interior of the church has an unusually peaceful atmosphere created by the use of pale sandstone and stained timber and restrained detailing.

The church is a significant landmark on the Great Western Highway.

The Christ Church has high local significance as the principal centre for Anglicanism in the lower Blue Mountains for over 110 years. The growth of the church and its adjacent complex over a century has been significant evidence of the social role Christ Church has continued to play for the local Anglican community. The major pieces of church furniture are highly significant memorials to the leading players in the creation of the building in the Victorian period.

The Christ Church Springwood is built to the design of John Sulman, a significant architect of the late 19th and early 20th century. Sulman was also a renowned educator and was responsible for the Sulman Medal, the highest award for architectural design in NSW.

The Christ Church Anglican Church was listed on the New South Wales State Heritage Register on 2 April 1999.

== See also ==
- List of Anglican churches in the Diocese of Sydney
- Anglican Diocese of Sydney
