= Goonellabah =

Eastern suburb of Lismore, New South Wales, Australia

Coordinates: 28°49′S 153°19′E

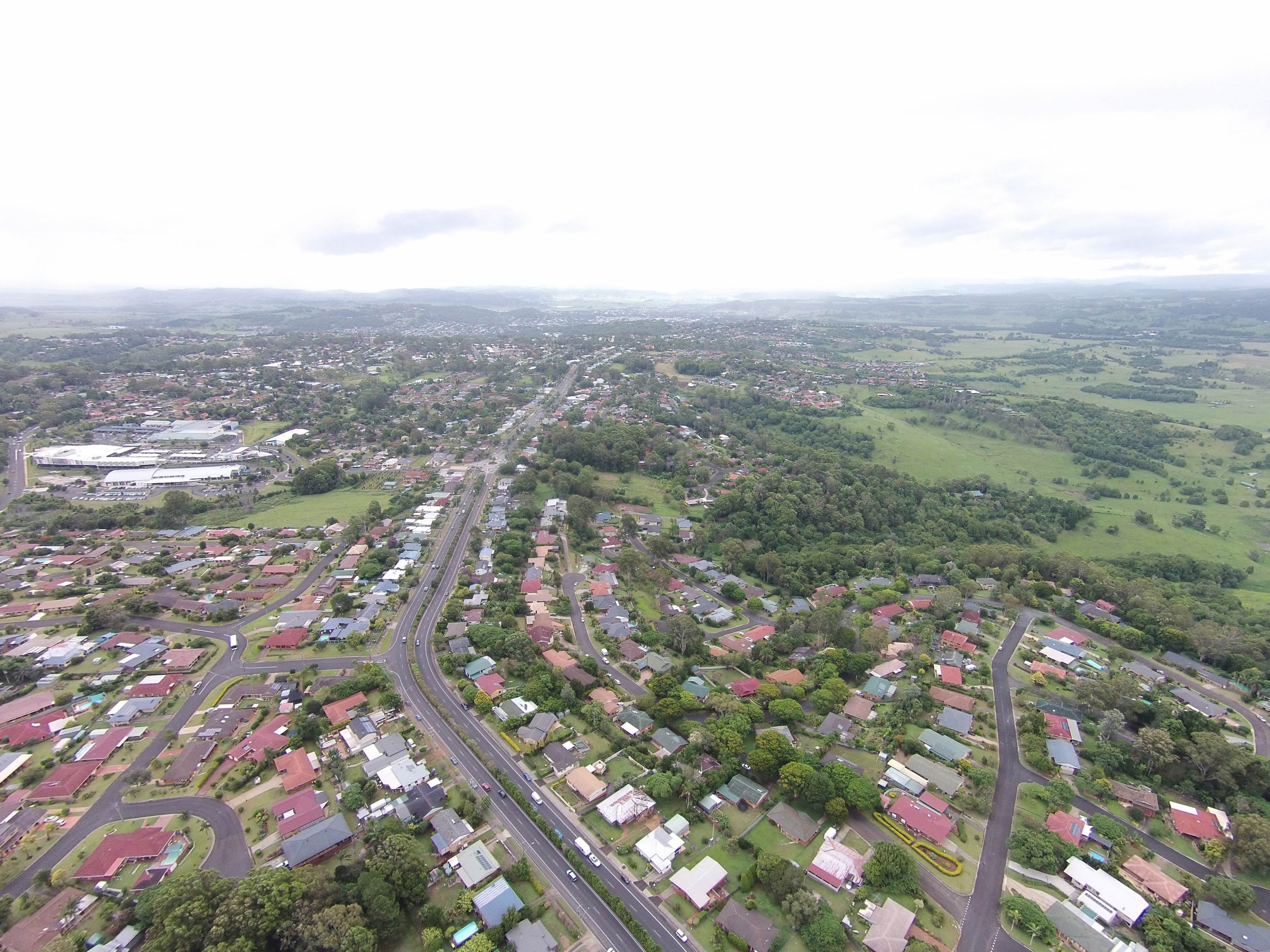
Goonellabah from the air, showing the Bruxner Highway into Lismore, and Goonellabah Shopping Centre in the distance

Goonellabah (goo-NELL-a-bah) is the eastern suburb of Lismore, New South Wales, Australia, and is on the Bruxner Highway. It sits within the City of Lismore local government area.

The Traditional Owners of this area are the Widjabul people of the Bundjalung nation.

The City of Lismore has its main offices on Oliver Avenue in the suburb. Kadina High School was established here in 1976.

Goonellabah has many sporting teams which compete in local competitions. These include football, table tennis, cricket, hockey, touch, and tennis.

At the 2021 census, Goonellabah had a population of 13,351.

== Origin of place name ==
The name Goonellabah is derived from the Bundjalung language word gunel which means 'native coral tree' or cunnel tree.

It was previously also known as Wilsons Ridge, Newtown, Paddington and Lover's Retreat.

== Heritage listings ==
Goonellabah has a number of heritage-listed sites, including:

- 562 Ballina Road: Tulloona
