= Riverstone High School =

Coordinates: 33°41′S 150°52′E

Riverston High School
- 71 McCulloch Street; Riverstone, New South Wales 2765; Australia

Information
- Type: Comprehensive high school
- Motto: Respect, Resilience, Responsibility
- Established: January 1962
- Principal: Rosemary Daubney
- Grades: 7–12
- Enrollment: 766
- Campus type: Suburban
- Website: https://riverstone-h.schools.nsw.gov.au/

Riverstone High School, is a co-educational, comprehensive high school located on the northwest fringes of Sydney, New South Wales, Australia.

Riverstone High School was established in January 1962 at 71 McCulloch Street, Riverstone.

In 1999, the school joined the Nirimba Collegiate, which also includes nearby Quakers Hill High School, Seven Hills High School, and Wyndham College. Riverstone operates from Year 7 through 12. In 1979–80, 970 students attended the school from year 7 to 12.

The school emblem is an oval with a navy surround. The centre is light blue with a red kangaroo. The school's core values are Resilience, Respect and Responsibility. The school auditorium was constructed in the early 1970s and opened in 1975. It was named the Jack Lang Auditorium in honour of the Labour politician John Thomas 'Jack' Lang, who lived at nearby Schofields for the last years of his life.
