= Rainbow Street Public School =

Coordinates: 33.9247°S 151.2370°E

Rainbow Street Public, Randwick
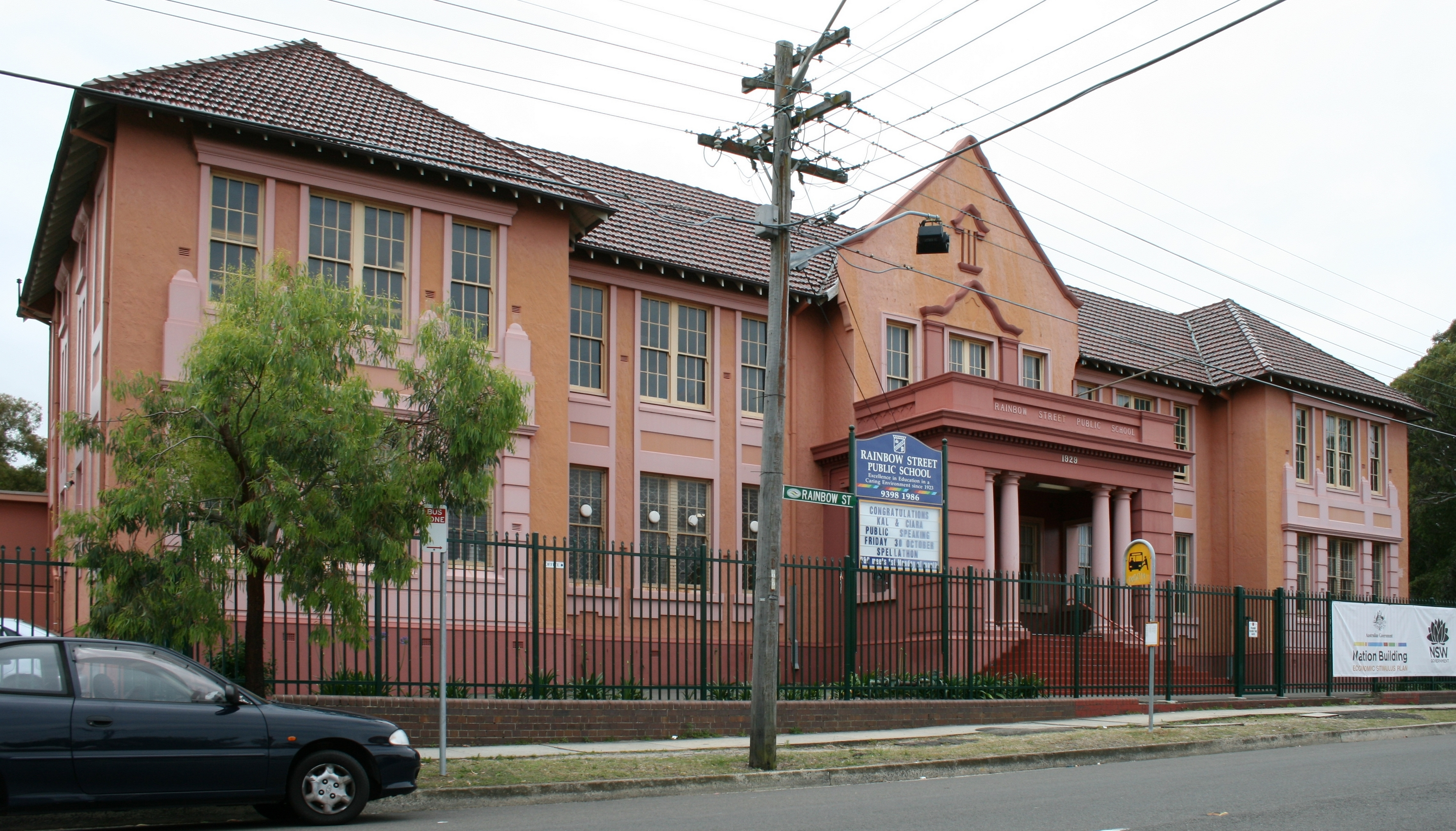

Information
- Established: 1924

Rainbow Street Public School is a public school located in Randwick, New South Wales, Australia operated by the New South Wales Department of Education. The school has 480 students and 34 staff, and is in close proximity to the University of NSW, Prince of Wales Hospital and the Randwick Army Barracks. The school has a close liaison with Randwick Boys and Girls High Schools, as well as Rainbow Street Childcare Centre.

Award-winning actor Russell Crowe attended the school.

In 2011, the principal was forced to resign after parents moved a motion of "no-confidence" in her, something criticized as potentially creating a "precedent" by unions.

In 2014, the state government announced plans to expand the school.
