= Springwood High School (New South Wales) =

Secondary school in New South Wales, Australia

Location
- Grose Road, Faulconbridge, Blue Mountains, New South Wales; Australia; 33°41′06″S 150°32′59″E

Information
- Type: Government-funded co-educational comprehensive secondary day school
- Motto: Press onward
- Established: 1 February 1967; 59 years ago
- School district: Blue Mountains; Regional North
- Educational authority: New South Wales Department of Education
- Principal: Stuart Harvie
- Teaching staff: 55.1 FTE (2018)
- Years: 7–12
- Enrolment: 664 (2018)
- Campus type: Suburban
- Colours: Junior school: green, black and white; Senior school: grey, black and white
- Website: springwood-h.schools.nsw.gov.au

Springwood High School is a government-funded co-educational comprehensive secondary day school, located on Grose Road, Faulconbridge, in the Blue Mountains region of New South Wales, Australia.

Established in 1967, the school enrolls 644 students in 2020, from Year 7 to Year 12, of whom five percent identified as Indigenous Australians and ten percent were from a language background other than English. The school is operated by the NSW Department of Education; the principal is Stuart Harvie.

== History ==
Springwood High School was built in 1967 to relieve overcrowding at Katoomba High and Nepean High schools. Springwood High School's original six buildings were constructed in three stages at a cost of A$1.2 million. The first classes for the 124 students and nine teachers were held at Penrith in February 1967. The school was ready for occupation in September 1967. The school's population swelled to more than 1600 students before Blaxland High School opened in 1977.

== Campus description ==
The school is made up of four blocks, named Jackson, Chapman, Martin and Moore. They are named after four local historic figures. There is also a canteen, and a hall which is often used by other parts of the community.

The school has two ovals and a grassy slope, an upper oval for soccer and football, and a lower oval for general use as well as for field hockey. Nathan Bracken opened the new cricket nets in 2009.

== School colours ==
The school colours are green, black and white for juniors (Years 7–10) and grey, black and white for seniors (Years 11 and 12). The PE and Sport uniform is a dark green shirt with the school logo and black shorts. The uniform, which is more of a dress code, allows students to express themselves in different ways while still adhering to the form and practicality that is the black and white. This allows students to maintain an identity while still creating identifiable attire.

== School events ==
Highlights of the school calendar include annual Swimming, Athletics and Cross Country carnivals and an Expo Day for Year 6 students. The Art Show is an annual fundraiser organised by the P&C which attracts many people each year to view and purchase local artworks.

== The arts ==
The school has a theatre company, composed of past and present students (SHSTC), which performs plays each year. However, complications from the COVID-19 pandemic have led to delays with several of the company's operations.

== Accolades ==
The school's main outlet of recognition for achievements, academic or otherwise, is the annual presentation night. An award is handed out each year at the annual presentation night called the "Decade Award", to recognise the achievements of alumni.

In the 2004 NSW High School Certificate (HSC), 24 Springwood High School students were distinguished achievers (reached Band 6 standard by achieving a mark for 90 or more for a course.) This was compared to only 16 from nearby Winmalee High School, and 13 from Blaxland High School.

Springwood High received the 'Director-General's School Achievement Award' in 2002 in recognition of its achievements over its 14-year history. It was labelled "a symbol of the achievements of quality public education".

== Notable alumni ==
- Nathan Bracken – cricket player

== See also ==
- List of government schools in New South Wales
- Education in Australia
