= Quakers Hill High School =

Location
- 70 Lalor Road; Quakers Hill, Sydney, NSW; Quakers Hill, New South Wales, 2763; Australia; 33°43′45.86″S 150°53′47.61″E

Information
- Type: State secondary day school
- Religious affiliation: Non-denominational
- Established: 1993; 33 years ago
- Authority: Department of Education (New South Wales)
- Principal: Jason White
- Years: 7–12
- Gender: Coeducational
- Enrolment: 925 (August 2025)
- Colours: Navy Blue; White
- Website: quakershil-h.schools.nsw.gov.au

Quakers Hill High School (QHHS) is a secondary school in Quakers Hill, a suburb in Western Sydney, Australia. and was opened on 27 January 1993 The school is in Ward 2 of the Blacktown City Council local government area.

== Administration ==
The school has a teaching staff of 74 (Full-time equivalent of 67.9) and a non-teaching staff of 25 (Full-time equivalent of 16.5).

As of 2025, the current principal is Jason White. Past principals have included:

Principals of the School
Principal	Tenure	
Principal	Initial Year	Final Year
Jason White	2023	Present
Andrew Skehan	2017	2022
Lauretta Claus	1993 (Founding)	2016

== Students ==
The school caters for students between Year 7 and Year 12. The recent trend in school enrolments (August figures) has been:

Recent Trend in Enrolments
Year	Boys	Girls	Total	Ref
2013	601	476	1,077	
2014	587	450	1,037	
2015	570	456	1,026	
2016	564	469	1,033	
2017	525	464	989	
2018	475	483	958	
2019	432	434	866	
2020	416	417	833	
2021	441	412	853	
2022	446	414	860	
2023	463	397	860	
2024	467	394	861	
2025	499	426	925	
2026	TBA	TBA	TBA	

== Cultural diversity ==
=== Multiculturalism ===
The recent trends in multicultural composition have been:

Trends in Multicultural Composition
Year	Indigenous	LBOTE	Ref
2014	5%	34%	
2015	5%	33%	
2016	5%	35%	
2017	5%	35%	
2018	6%	35%	
2019	6%	33%	
2020	5%	33%	
2021	5%	33%	
2022	4%	36%	
2023	4%	38%	
2024	5%	40%	
2025	5%	45%	
2026	TBA	TBA	

== Nirimba Collegiate Group of Schools ==
The Nirimba Collegiate Group of Schools was established in 1999 and comprises Quakers Hill High School and three other schools in the Blacktown area, i.e. Riverstone High School, Seven Hills High School, and Wyndham College. The group is part of the Blacktown North - Educational Pathways Program (EPP) the focus of which is providing students with the tools to choose the higher education or career avenue that suits them. The schools in the collegiate operate independently of each other, but the four principals work closely together, sharing student intake. The Nirimba Collegiate is managed by the College Management Group (CMG). The collegiate group has partnership with Nirimba TAFE and the University of Western Sydney, thereby offering students opportunities to undertake accelerated programs and career specific courses.

== Notable alumni ==
- Jacob Hansford, Olympic swimmer for Australia
- Kenrick Monk, Olympic swimmer for Australia
- Matthew Norman, Convicted drug smuggler and member of the Bali Nine

== See also ==
- List of schools in Greater Western Sydney
- Education in New South Wales
- New South Wales Education Standards Authority
- List of Government schools in New South Wales
- Education in Australia
- Lists of schools in Australia
- Quakers Hill
- Wyndham College
