= Laurel Pardey =

Australian pianist

Minnie Laurel Pardey
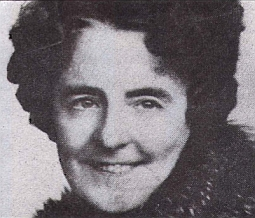
- Born: 19 September 1897; Woollahra
- Died: 13 January 1974 (aged 76); Royal North Shore Hospital
- Other names: Laurel O'Sullivan
- Employer: Mastertouch
- Known for: Piano roll pianist
- Spouse: John William O'Sullivan
- Relatives: Edith Pardey

(Minnie) Laurel Pardey (19 September 1897 – 13 January 1974) was an Australian pianola-roll pianist who worked closely with her elder sister Edith Emma Pardey. Starting in the 1920s they became known for the thousands of tunes they arranged and created for the pianola for Mastertouch.

== Life ==
Pardey was born in 1897 in Woollahra. Her parents were Minnie (born Cooper) and Edmund Pardey. She and her sister were (probably) educated at Mount St Marys College and Convent in New South Wales where they both learned to play the piano. They both then gained medals for their playing and qualifications from the Royal College of Music and the Associated Board of the Royal Academy of Music. They would practise duets together at the family's boarding house in Katoomba and play at Sydney's Town Hall and locally at the Carrington Hotel. It was while she was playing at the Carrington Hotel in Katoomba that she was approached by George Horton. Horton had built a machine that could record piano playing. Horton was very happy with her playing but the machine did not make a good recording. However the results were sufficient to show to others and he was able to gather funds to retry - after a fact finding visit to the USA. In 1919 Laurel made her first piano roll with a Duo label for G. H. Horton & Co. Ltd.

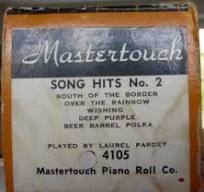
Laurel Pardey's work for the Mastertouch Piano Roll Co.

They were the company's first employees of and in 1922 it became the Mastertouch Piano Roll company. They are credited together with Lettie Keyes and Len Luscombe for arranging thousands of tunes for the pianola.

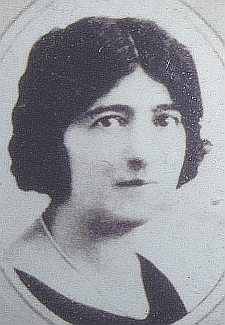
Edith Emma Pardey

Her sister's and her work attracted significant coverage. An example on 14 May 1930 in the Sydney Morning Herald reviewed tunes they recorded from the 1929 film "The Great Gabbo", I'm in Love with You and The Web of Love. The same review mentions their four-handed version of the Haymaker's March and her sister's recording of The Punch and Judy Show. The review also mentioned six other songs that were part of the sisters' The Song Lovers Medley.

Her sister Edith married Frank Murn at St James's Anglican Church in Sydney and she was credited as Edith Murn until 1933 when their son was born. Frank was employed writing lyrics for the rolls and in the late 1930s Edith returned in the 1940s to play and record. By this time there was still a piano roll business but the boom had passed.

Laurel married in 1941 giving her age as 35 when she married John William O'Sullivan.

Laurel Pardey died in Royal North Shore Hospital in 1974 and her husband survived her.
