= The Independent (Katoomba) =

Australian newspaper

The Independent of Katoomba in the Blue Mountains in New South Wales began publication on Wednesday 14 May 1930.

== History ==
The Independent was owned, published and edited by Thomas Walter Guest and printed at the offices of Joseph Bennett & Son. It began publication on Wednesday 14 May 1930, appeared weekly and circulated through Katoomba, Blackheath and Leura. It appears to have survived for just under a year.

== Digitisation ==
The Independent has been digitised as part of the Australian Newspapers Digitisation Program project of the National Library of Australia.

== See also ==
- List of newspapers in New South Wales
- List of newspapers in Australia
