= Katoomba Post Office =

Katoomba Post Office (former)
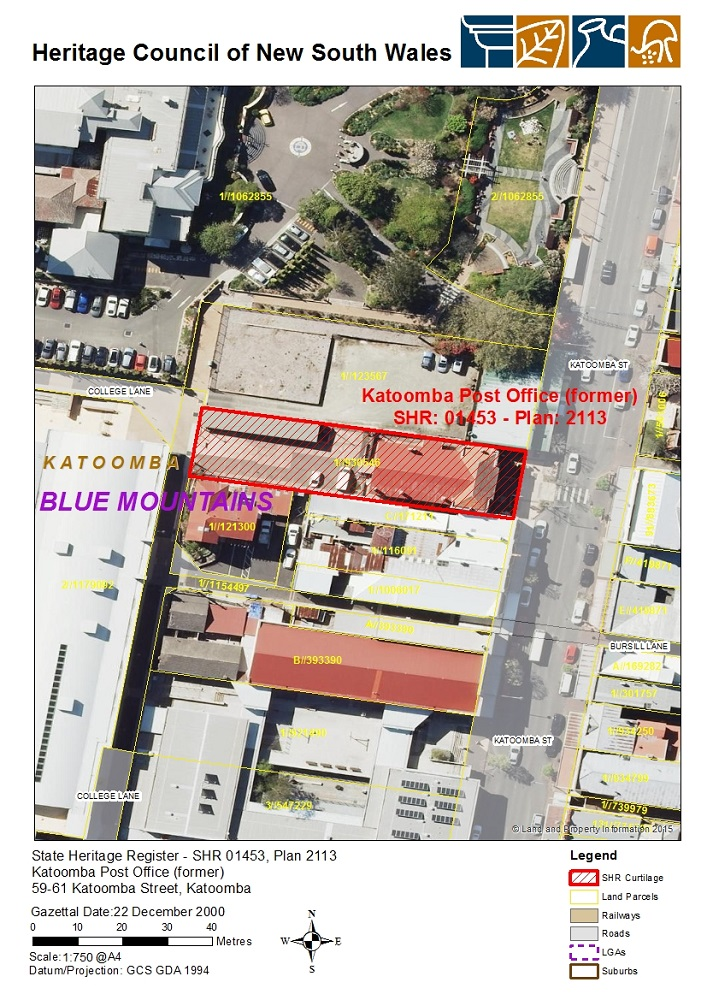
- Heritage boundaries

- Location within New South Wales Location within Australia
- 33°42′49″S 150°18′40″E
- Location: 59–61 Katoomba Street, Katoomba, City of Blue Mountains, New South Wales, Australia

Site notes
- Architect: NSW Government Architect's office
- Architectural style: Georgian Revival

New South Wales Heritage Register
- Official name: Katoomba Post Office (former)
- Type: State heritage (built)
- Designated: 22 December 2000
- Reference no.: 1453
- Type: Post Office
- Category: Postal and Telecommunications

The Katoomba Post Office is a heritage-listed former post office and now retail building at 59–61 Katoomba Street, Katoomba, City of Blue Mountains, New South Wales, Australia. It was designed by NSW Government Architect's office. It is also known as Katoomba Post Office (former). It was added to the New South Wales State Heritage Register on 22 December 2000.

== Description ==
Parapet wall to ends; two storey face brickwork; lower level base of face brickwork with upper and pilasters; face brickwork chimneys with terracotta chimney pots; multi-paned double hung timber windows.

=== Condition ===
As at 26 October 2000, the condition of the post office was good.

=== Modifications and dates ===
- 1917 – Alterations
- 1923 – Addition of second storey

== Heritage listing ==
As at 26 October 2000, historically and socially significant as a Post Office closely associated with the commercial centre of Katoomba and communications within the region. As an individual building the Post Office makes a strong contribution to the character of the Katoomba Street commercial shop group and streetscape.

Significant in demonstrating the transfer of control of Post Offices from State to Commonwealth. The NSW Government continued to design and build Post Offices until 1916 after which the Commonwealth took control. The Georgian Revival style of the state-built Katoomba Post Office (1910) was used as a model for a large series of new Post Offices built up to 1930 by the Commonwealth Department of Works and Railways.

Katoomba Post Office was listed on the New South Wales State Heritage Register on 22 December 2000.

== See also ==
- Australian non-residential architectural styles
- List of post offices in New South Wales
