= Coxs River track =

Historic road in New South Wales, Australia

- Location within New South Wales Location within Australia
- 33°51′37″S 150°20′58″E
- Location: Coxs River Arms, Lake Burragorang/Warragamba Dam, City of Blue Mountains, New South Wales, Australia

Site notes
- Owner: Sydney Catchment Authority

New South Wales Heritage Register
- Official name: Track
- Type: State heritage (built)
- Designated: 18 November 1999
- Reference no.: 1372
- Type: Trail/Track
- Category: Transport - Land

The Coxs River track is a heritage-listed former walking track and road and now walking track at Cox's River Arms, Lake Burragorang/Warragamba Dam, City of Blue Mountains, New South Wales, Australia. The track is also known as the Warragamba Dam - Burragorang Valley - Wentworth Falls Track. The property is owned by the Sydney Catchment Authority, an agency of the Government of New South Wales. It was added to the New South Wales State Heritage Register on 18 November 1999.

== History ==
One of the first places in the Gundungurra traditional homelands that most appealed to the Anglo-Celt settlers were the river flats of the Burragorang Valley (now flooded under Warragamba Dam). Even before the valley was officially surveyed in 1827–8, many early settlers were already squatting on blocks that they planned to officially occupy following the issue of freehold title grants. From the Burragorang Valley and using Aboriginal pathways, other valleys to the west were occupied and developed by the settlers with construction of outstations and stock routes. These cattle entrepreneurs were then followed by cedar-wood extractors and miners.

The Gundungurra traditional owners resisted the taking of their lands, and, relying on various laws of the colony at the time, continually applied for official ownership. Although their individual claims failed, in some kind of recognition of the significance of the designated tracts of land claimed, six Aboriginal Reserves (under the control of the NSW Aborigines Protection Board) were formally declared in the Burragorang Valley. Even after these reserves were revoked, many of the traditional owners remained, quietly refusing to leave their traditional homelands.

Finally pushed into the "Gully", a fringe development in West Katoomba from about 1894, the Gully community stayed together for more than 60 years until dispossessed of the Gully by the then Blue Mountains Shire Council so a group of local businessmen could develop a speedway that became known as the Catalina Race Track. The Gully people kept talking about areas of land they had walked in as children - the nearby Megalong and Kanimbla Valleys and the Burragorang Valley. They knew of the profound significance of these valleys for their parents and grandparents.

== Description ==
The track was built by the Pearce family around 1870 using packed stone and earth. The track is substantially intact.

The track leads to the Wentworth Falls in the Burragorang Valley.

The heritage listing by the New South Wales Office of Environment and Heritage gives the primary address of the track as "Coxs River Arms, Lake Burragorang, Warragamba Dam, NSW." However, when the co-ordinates provided in the article (Lat: -33.8548514027 Long: 150.3385892100) are searched in Google maps, the point is shown as being on the western side of the Kedumba River, near its junction with Coxs River Arm. The river must be crossed to walk to Wentworth Falls. A logical starting point for the track is at the point where Kedumba Valley Road nearly touches Coxs River Arm, at co-ordinates -33.860317, 150.349545 (provided by Google maps). From this point, Kedumba Valley Road proceeds to its junction with Tableland Road, which then proceeds to the Great Western Highway at Wentworth Falls, a distance of about 25 km. The heritage listing states that the track is a "former walking track and road."

The Kedumba River crossing campground is situated about 16 km from Wentworth Falls and 9 km from Coxs River Arm. Public access is prohibited along part of the track, below the campground.

== Heritage listing ==
The track is a historically significant archaeological relic built by Europeans as a route of transportation on settlement of the Burragorang Valley. It is representative of a very early form of road construction, evidenced by its design and siting. It has immense historical value as it facilitated the European exploration and expansion of the valley. There are anecdotal linkages to the Pearce family, who were active settlers within the upper reaches of the Blue Mountains. It is a significant component of the cultural landscape and is understood to be exceedingly rare because of the high level of intactness noted in the remaining fabric.

Track was listed on the New South Wales State Heritage Register on 18 November 1999 having satisfied the following criteria.

The place possesses uncommon, rare or endangered aspects of the cultural or natural history of New South Wales.

This item is assessed as historically rare statewide.

The place is important in demonstrating the principal characteristics of a class of cultural or natural places/environments in New South Wales.

This item is assessed as aesthetically representative regionally.

== See also ==
- Blue Mountains walking tracks
