= Linden Observatory Complex =

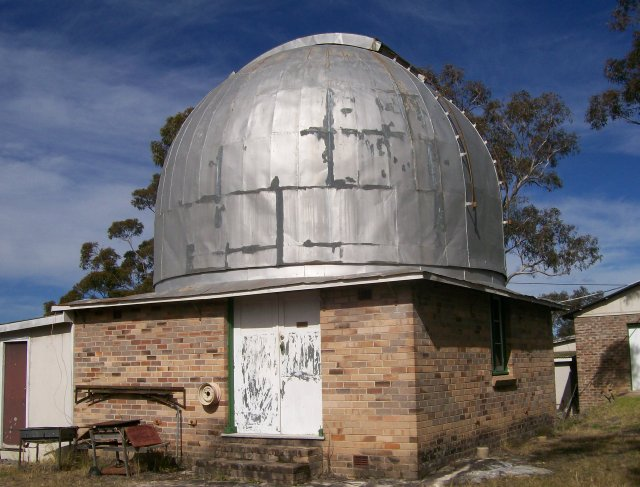

- Location within New South Wales Location within Australia
- 33°42′26″S 150°29′44″E
- Location: 91–111 Glossop Road, Linden, City of Blue Mountains, New South Wales, Australia

History
- Built: 1938–1948

Site notes
- Architect: Ken Beames
- Owner: Linden Observatory Trust
- Website: lindenobservatory.com.au

New South Wales Heritage Register
- Official name: Linden Observatory Complex; K Beames Engineering Co
- Type: State heritage (complex / group)
- Designated: 5 March 2010
- Reference no.: 1807
- Type: Observatory
- Category: Scientific Facilities
- Builders: Ken Beames

The Linden Observatory Complex is a heritage-listed former observatory and manufacture of optical precision implements and now residence, museum, observatory, education facility and meeting venue located at 91–111 Glossop Road, Linden, City of Blue Mountains, New South Wales, Australia. It was designed and built by Ken Beames from 1938 to 1948. It is also known as K Beames Engineering Co. The property is owned by the Linden Observatory Trust. It was added to the New South Wales State Heritage Register on 5 March 2010.

== History ==
=== Foundations of modern astronomy ===
Astronomy, it can be argued, is the oldest science in the world and practised by many of the ancient cultures. In ancient times astronomical practise involved the observation of the skies with the naked eye, noting the changes in and movement of the Sun, stars and planets using this information to plot ritual or agricultural calendars. Some of the earliest recorded astronomical observations were made by the Chinese which date from the 6th century BC. One of these observations note the regular eclipses of the Moon which were explained as the Moon being attacked by a hungry dragon. People diligently made as much noise as possible so the dragon would flee.

Western astronomy has its genesis in the kingdoms of Sumer and Assyria where priests used observation of the heavens for purposes of divination. Based in these practises Babylonia is credited with the development of a more sophisticated observation of the skies and detecting the periodic nature of astronomical activity that is able to be predicted through mathematics. The work of the Babylonian astronomers was the basis for Greek, Indian, Sassanian, Byzantine, Islamic, Central Asian and western European astrology.

In the 4th century BC Greek astronomers were the first to develop a three dimensional model to describe the motion of the planets around the Earth. Later, a slowly developing debate regarding the Earth versus the Sun as the centre of this movement grew, culminating in the work of Copernicus who posited a mathematically supported system where the planets revolved around the Sun. His work was later expanded by Galileo and Kepler.

Up until the 17th century, astronomy was positional and depended on observations of the naked eye. In the early 17th century a new instrument, the telescope was invented by Hans Lipperhey and quickly taken up and improved upon by Galileo Galilei. In 1610, armed with his 20 XX refractor telescope, Galileo discovered four moons of Jupiter and for the first time in history observed the movement of a satellite around a planet. Using his telescope Galileo also observed that the phases of Venus were similar to lunar phases and argued that these observations empirically supported the theory that the Earth moves around the Sun.

James Kepler a contemporary of Galileo's supported Galileo's observations. He was the first to attempt to derive mathematical predictions of celestial motions from assumed physical cases. Years of his research culminated in the publication of his "Epitome of Copernican Astronomy" in 1615 in which his three laws of planetary motion were outlined, theorising a heliocentric planetary system. By 1687 the marriage of physics and astronomy reached its epitome as Isaac Newton realised that the same force which attracted objects to the Earth also fixed the Moon in orbit around the Earth and posited the law of universal gravitation.

=== European astronomy in NSW ===
In 1768 Cook set sail from Plymouth in England. His destination was Tahiti where he, the accompanying astronomer, two artists and two naturalists were to observe and document the 1769 transit of Venus across the Sun. Observation and documentation of the transit was to provide an accurate measurement of the distance between the Earth and the Sun. The southern ocean in 1769 was known to be the best place to take such a measurement. On his return journey, Cook "discovered" the east coast of Australia which he mapped on this journey home.

In 1788 the First Fleet, arrived at Botany Bay and then moved on to settle on the shores of Sydney Cove. With the fleet was a young Lieutenant William Dawes, who had had a deep interest in astronomy. Dawes was charged with the task of setting up the first observatory in the colony and carried all the requisite equipment to do this on the long voyage to the colony. He was to observe the predicted return of Halley's comet in 1789. Dawes pitched his "tent-observatory" on a rocky, heavily wooded ridge on the west side of Sydney Cove, a kilometre away from the first settlement. The area was later named Dawes Point. A plaque placed on the south pylon of the Sydney Harbour Bridge commemorates Dawes observatory. Despite his attention to the night skies, Dawes did not observe the comet.

In late 1821 Governor Brisbane ordered the establishment of an observatory at Parramatta from where he, with the help of two assistants, began the process of mapping the southern skies. Brisbane equipped the observatory with the finest instruments available at the time and installed a scientific library in the building. This facility was operational up until 1847 and the published findings from this observatory marked Australia's first significant contribution to international astronomy. The site of this observatory is listed on the NSW State Heritage Register.

In 1858 under the supervision of the Colonial Astronomer of NSW, Rev. William Scot, the construction of the Sydney Observatory at the Rocks was commenced, It was completed in 1859 although the first observations were recorded in 1858. The observatory included a central time-ball tower, a dome to accommodate an equatorial telescope and a transit room for meridian instruments. This was the first government funded observatory established in Australia with others established in Melbourne, Adelaide, and Perth by the close of the 19th century. Like the Parramatta observatory site the Sydney Observatory is listed on the NSW State Heritage Register to commemorate its heritage values.

During the second half of the 19th century the nation's first astronomical groups and societies were established and a strong community of amateur astronomers and telescope makers emerged. The amateur practitioners funded their own facilities and made an enormous contribution to astronomy in Australia. John Tebutt was one of the most significant of these amateur astronomers. Inspired to pursue astronomy by his observation of the spectacular Donati's comet in 1858, Tebutt became internationally acclaimed in 1861 when he became the first person to discover the "Great Comet". Tebutt established an observatory at Windsor in 1864 and continued to make important observations in the southern skies "including lunar occultation of stars, eclipses and shadow transits of the satellites of Jupiter, the position of minor planets and double and variable stars". Once again this pioneering observatory, "Peninsular House" is listed on the State Heritage Register.

Ken Beames who designed and constructed the Observatory complex at Linden was part of this strong tradition of amateur astronomy of the late 19th and early 20th century. As historian of astronomy in Australia Wayne Orchiston points out the amateur cohort of astronomers fall into 3 categories:"apprentices, journeymen and masters. Apprentices are just beginning their astronomical careers, while masters are those acknowledged experts who are able to communicate effectively with professional astronomers in their own chosen fields of expertise. Kenneth Beams was very definitely a master".

Unlike most other amateur astronomers Beames' field of interest was in the design and construction of telescopes and optical instruments rather than the observation of the night skies. In fact during the 1930s, 1940s and 1950s Beams was one of the few if not the only amateur or professional astronomers making telescopes and other optical instruments for astronomy in NSW. In a newspaper article from 1970 Beames noted that he had made in excess of 450 telescopes ranging from 6 inch to 24 inch instruments. This is unusual during the mid decades of the twentieth century when most astronomical instruments were imported from Britain, Europe or America.

Although not a professional astronomer, Beames' work making telescopes and other instruments has been praised by both amateur and professional astronomers as masterpieces of craftsmanship and engineering which have contributed to the development of the field in NSW and Australia. The 24 inch reflector telescope Beames completed in 1939 was the largest amateur or professionally constructed reflector telescope in NSW and retained this status until the 40 inch and 24 inch telescopes were constructed and installed at the Siding Spring Observatory in the mid 1960s. The only other amateur built telescope to rival Beames was that built by Captain Baker in 1868 for the Ballarat Observatory and the only professional telescope that was larger than Beames 24 inch telescope was the 30 inch Reynolds Reflector telescope at Mr Stromlo. The Beames 24 inch telescope was also unique as one of the first large telescopes in Australia to incorporate electric motor drives to operate the telescope and dome.

Beames designed and engineered other optical instruments for astronomical uses by amateur and professional organisations in NSW. One example of such an instrument is the blink comparator commissioned by Father O'Leary of the Riverview College Observatory which was completed in 1939. This instrument is still held in the Riverview Observatory Collection and is likely to be the first blink comparator designed and engineered in Australia. After World War II these instruments became commonplace.

=== Kenneth Beames ===
Kenneth Beames was born in Gilgandra in 1899. His first job was at the Gligandra Post Office where as a telegram boy he learned morse code and soon moved on to becoming a telegraph operator and postal officer. He also learned semaphore. During World War I Ken Beams served as a signaller for the Australian Light Horse in Palestine and on returning to Australia he trained in electrical and mechanical engineering after war. He then served an apprenticeship as a telephone technician later moving onto the area of wireless making.

In 1924 he established a business making wireless sets which operated from his home first in Clemens St, Drummoyne near Five Dock and expanded to include the manufacture of various electric appliances, gaskets and washers. By the 1930s his business was known as Ken Beames Engineering Company.

In the 1930s Beames began studying optics and mathematics in pursuit of his interest in astronomy. In 1934 he completed his first telescope, a 6-inch or 15.2 cm equatorial mount, reflector telescope. Late in the 1930s he began work on a 24-inch (610 mm) reflector telescope at this workshop in Drummoyne. He obtained the glass blank from Chance Brothers in England, and then set about constructing an electric grinding machine to grind and polish the blank. At the same time he worked on the equatorial mounting and the telescope tube and the optical and engineering work were complete by 1939 although the telescope was not assembled until after World War II. During the 1940s Beames also mounted a 17-inch (432 mm) Schmidt telescope and a 6inch (162 mm) refractor telescope used guide scope on the side of the main telescope. The Schmidt was never completed as the corrector plate was stolen before it was installed.

During the war years Beames' skills in optics enabled him to make a significant contribution to the production of optical munitions. At the time, there were very few people with the skill and knowledge of optic production and his services were called upon to make sighting telescope and signal lamp reflectors for Aldis signal lamps used by the Royal Australian Navy & British Navy. The extent of this production is currently unknown as he probably sub-contracted to AWA in Ashfield and is not mentioned in the official history as a contractor. Nevertheless, preliminary research in the observatory archive and assessment of moveable heritage there indicates that his work producing optical munitions during the war was sizable. He also manufactured naval artillery fuse gaskets for the British Navy and parts for the airframes of Mosquito bombers for the Royal; Australian Airforce. It was also during the war that Beames joined the NSW Branch of the British Astronomers Association.

At the end of the war Beames took steps to finally locate and assemble his 24-inch telescope in a suitable place away from the light pollution afforded by Sydney. It was first assembled in a sliding roof observatory building at Lisarow near Gosford in 1946 but the clouded night skies experienced there prompted Beames to purchase land at Linden in the Blue Mountains in 1948. The square brick base of the observatory building was built by his friend and fellow member of the British Astronomical Association, Albert York who was a builder by trade.

Over the next ten years Beams designed and built the dome, and the electrical control systems including winding his own specialised motors. He built most of the machinery and equipment necessary to assist in the construction of the telescope which was housed in three workshops on site. Finally by 1959, the 24 inch telescope was installed in the observatory building and made operational.

Beames had an association with those at the Mt. Stromlo observatory although there are few records of this visit to Linden by Bart Bok, and a letter from Mt Stromlo (Cyril Jackson) asking for help constructing a mounting for the "Ross Camera" to be used in production of a Star Catalogue. The letter states in part "I thought you the most likely person, knowledgeable and practical who could provide me with some ideas" and "you know that I was very impressed with the quality of your work and enterprise, and our observatory would like to keep in contact with you". It is not known whether Mr Beames was able to make the mounting or not.

There is evidence from letters from the CSIRO, of Beames lending the CSIRO Physics laboratory parabolic mirrors for ongoing experimental use.

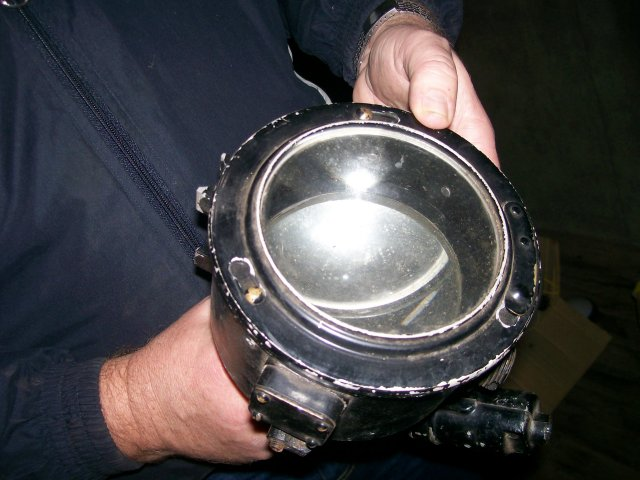
World War II optics

While Beames' telescope attracted much interest from amateur and professional astronomers who assumed the optics to be first class due to his experience manufacturing optics during World War II no one else was allowed access to the telescope until the 1980s. This was when Wayne Orchiston, then working at Mt Stromlo Observatory and close friend, was allowed to make a number of observations in return for re-silvering the telescope's mirrors. Orchiston's observations confirmed the fine quality of the optics and the power of the instrument and further advanced the respect of both his amateur and professional colleagues.

In the 1960s Beames turned his attention to the construction of a large planetarium. Although based on the original Zeiss model it was essentially designed from first principles to allow Beames to incorporate several innovations to improve the performance of the planetarium. Beames planned for the planetarium to form the centre of an astronomy education centre when it was installed in its own dome located on his property. Work continued on the planetarium and the mechanical, drive mechanisms and projectors were complete by the mid 1980s when illness prevented Beames from continuing with the project. All that remained to be completed were the star projection system and the lenses.

In addition to his work making telescopes and optical instruments Ken Beames continued to operate his regular manufacturing business and made gaskets and fuel injector components for Leyland busses for NSW Department of Transport continuously from the 1940s to 1980s. This work helped to fund his ongoing work designing telescopes and other instruments. He also worked on other personal projects such as the brass clock and the brass leaved book – the Rubaiyt of Omar Khayym. These objects display Beames' attention to detail and fine engineering skills and are regarded as an important part of the moveable heritage associated with the observatory.

Ken Beames was very generous with his time for amateur telescope makers, and would advise them and give them materials to assist in their projects. For example, during a documented visit to Port Macquarie Observatory, Beames constructed and donated to the observatory a set of apparatus for testing Foucault mirrors. Many telescope makers were given glass blanks and grinding powders with which to start their own telescopes.

Ken Beams' manufacturing business 1986 and he died in 1989. The use of the site as an amateur observatory for the community continues until today.

== Description ==
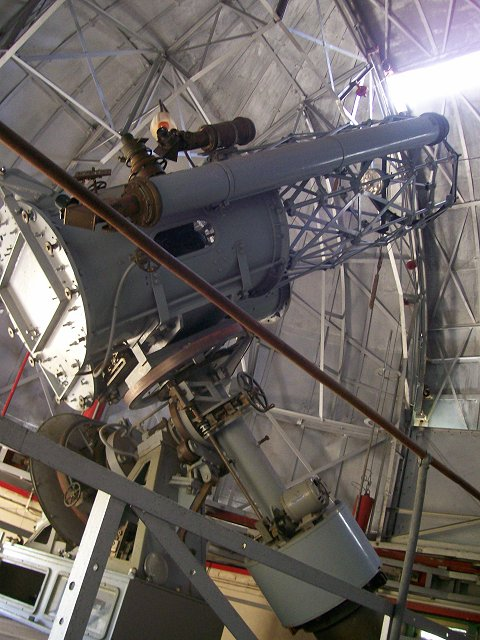
Telescope

The observatory site is located on a lot of land sized approx. 20 hectares (49 acres) in the Blue Mountains. The listing curtilage encompasses part of this 20 ha and includes the main elements of the Observatory which consist of:

1. The Observatory building housing the 24 inch (610 mm) reflecting telescope and an adjoining room;
2. A sliding roof observatory housing a 30-inch (762 mm) telescope;
3. A machine shop which also houses the planetarium instrument;
4. A sheet metal workshop now used as a meeting room and telescope storage, with adjoining optical room;
5. A storeroom;
6. A constant temperature building;
7. Observing fields with concrete pads for telescopes to be mounted;
8. K. Beames' former residence.

All buildings, except the sliding roof dome, are from the Beames' era, and house various parts of the historical collection.

The telescope is a 24-inch (610 mm) diameter reflecting scope with a Nasmyth optical arrangement comprising "an unperforated parabolic glass primary, a 152 mm plano convex secondary and an optical flat which directs the light to an eyepiece assembly on the side of the telescope tube." ( Orchiston 1989 ). The base of the 2.74 metre telescope tube is fashioned from a solid aluminium sheet while the upper extension is constructed in a "cross braced lattice design" ( Orchiston, 1989 ). The telescope utilises an equatorial mount the movement of which is achieved using a number of electric drives. "The main drive wheel contains 720 teeth and is operated by an electric motor, which is accurately timed by a seconds pendulum. A second wheel is used for fast slewing and also has a fine adjustment, while the third wheel is used for positioning the telescope in right ascension according to the setting circle. There is also a prominent declination circle and a declination fast slew motor". Another telescope, an incomplete Schmidt camera, is attached to the 24 inch telescope tube as is a large finder scope initially designed as a telescope in its own right and adapted as a guide scope.

The telescope is located on top of a large solid brick pier within a building comprising a square brick base and a large 3.7 metre rotating dome constructed of steel and galvanised iron. The dome has two steel shutters operated by motors. The rotation of the dome is achieved by the movement of 16 wheels "driven from the hand paddle located adjacent to the eyepiece of the main telescope, or from drive controls located at various points round the dome ring".

The Observatory building also contains Beames' first telescope constructed in 1934. This instrument is constructed of brass and is also a finely crafted work. A cupboard contains various sights and lenses made by Beames as well as an electrical switch and power board constructed by Beames to power the large telescope and dome and the second pendulum which he designed and constructed to regulate the movement of the main wheel of the telescope mount. The telescope and the observatory building were all designed and manufactured by Beames in his workshops at Five Dock and later the workshops located on the observatory site. The only exception was the machining of the right ascension and declination shafts which were done at Morts Dock. The Observatory building also contains left over boxes of optical components of sighting telescopes and signalling lamps as well as working drawings and notes for his optical work during WWII and the construction and engineering of the telescope and observatory.

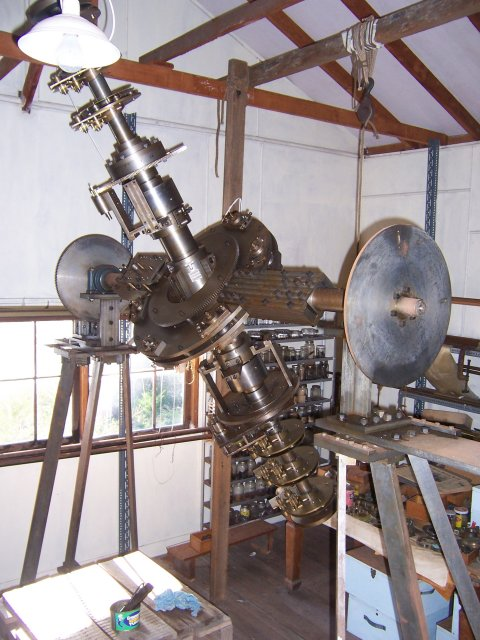
Planetarium

Various engineering workshops and other buildings house machinery used in his engineering business, and in construction his last project, a planetarium instrument. Workshops and buildings on site also house drawings, invoices, specifications and other parts of the collection including machinery . One workshop was a sheet metal workshop and while this now serves as a meeting room and storage space, it still contains sheet metal lathes and other tools.

The banks of grinding machines that Beames specially designed for mass production of WWII optics for the Australian and British Navy and his other grinding and polishing equipment are located in a custom built temperature, controlled workshop located within the proposed listing curtilage.

The main workshop houses machinery typical of engineering workshops from the 1940s and 1950s and includes a large number of lathes and other tools and is largely intact. This workshop also houses the partly completed planetarium instrument and clock. The planetarium is the only one to be designed and constructed in Australia. Similar optical star projecting systems located in Australia such as the HV McKay Planetarium in Melbourne and the Launceston Planetarium were imported from Ziess in Germany in the early to mid 1960s. Beams' planetarium although based on the Zeiss design was developed from first principles to allow Mr Beams to incorporate what he considered to be design improvements on the Zeiss model.

Within the listing curtilage is located a modern 30 inch (762 mm) reflecting telescope housed in a sliding roof building, constructed around 2002 and Beams' house underneath which are located the mould and other accessories used in the design and construction of the telescope and observatory.

=== Condition ===
The historic telescope is in good mechanical and optical condition – the mirrors were re-aluminised by Mt Stromlo Observatory as a gift to Ken Beames. The custom electrical equipment built by Beames has failed and parts are no longer available. Machinery in workshops shows signs of disuse, but is probably serviceable. Drawings, documents and notebooks are degrading and in need of conservation. Other artefacts are in a variety of conditions ranging from poor and in need of conservation, through to excellent, depending on age and storage. The collection of tools, machinery, dies, jigs, patterns, notebooks and drawings and other material associated with the construction of the telescope and other works by Beames has a very high degree of integrity in terms of the completeness of the collection, the variety of skill applications it represents, and the overall condition.

=== Modifications and dates ===
- Alterations made to power the dome and telescope drive by Beames in the 1980s to work around failure of some sub-systems.
- New 3 phase sub-main installed in dome following lightning damage to old board in 2008.
- 30 inch (762 mm) reflector installed in separate building in 2002 for public access and observations.
- 8 inch (200 mm) and 12 inch (300 mm) mm reflecting telescopes purchased in 2005 and 2007 to assist public access viewing and education.
- The original storeroom was lost in the 1977 bushfires and rebuilt in 1978.

=== Further information ===
Ken Beames' engineering business was originally located in Clements St. Five Dock, and moved to the Blue Mountains following World War II. Despite being highly regarded in the scientific engineering and astronomical community, the story of Ken Beames and his work remains largely untold. Following his death in 1989 (aged 89) his estate passed into the hands of a trust. With few funds available the trust, the Linden Observatory Trust has struggled to maintain the site with the help of volunteers and members of the amateur astronomical community. Ken Beames work and history is unique and worthy of research and conservation. The long term viability of the site is unknown and the collection and its integrity is at risk without conservation measures. The site is still in use by amateur astronomers in keeping with Ken Beames' wishes that it be used for amateur astronomy and education; on two occasions supernova have been discovered by observers at Linden. A significant assessment of Beames' sketches and engineering drawings has been made by Mr. Julian Holland in 2008. This work is being funded by a Community Heritage Grant obtained by the observatory trustees.

== Heritage listing ==
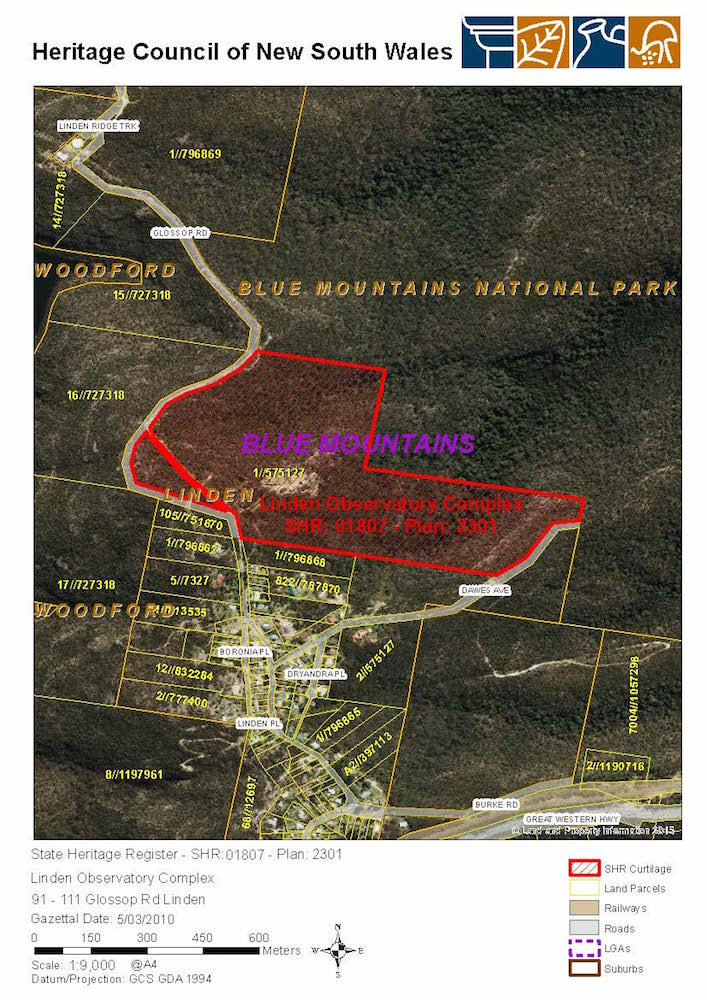
Heritage boundaries

The Linden Observatory is State heritage significance for its historic values as a rare and representative example of a twentieth century amateur astronomy observatory complex including telescopes and other instruments, dome observatory building and the complex of workshops and machinery used to make all the instrumentation and supporting infrastructure. The observatory is evidence of the significant technical and innovative abilities of its creator Ken Beames. He was one of the very few instrument makers working in Australia during the early and mid 20th century when most professional and amateur instruments were imported from Europe of America. Beames' work as an astronomy instrument maker and optics maker was highly regarded by his peers at the time and is still acknowledged as a major contribution to the history and development of astronomy in NSW. It is also tangible evidence of the continuance of the strong collaborative tradition between professional and amateur astronomers through the decades of the twentieth century.

Ken Beames' contribution to the history and development of NSW is also marked by his input to munitions production during WWII where his skills at manufacturing optical components was sought after by the government faced with a dearth of ability in that area.

The 24-inch reflector telescope made by Ken Beames and housed in the original observatory was the largest and most technologically advanced telescope in NSW from the late 1930s when it was completed up until the mid 1960s when the 24-inch and 40-inch telescopes were constructed and installed at Siding Spring Observatory. This telescope with its observatory dome was one of the first in Australia to incorporate electric motors to operate the telescope and dome.

The intact complex complete with observatory, instruments, working design drawings, machinery, jigs, documentary archive is likely to be of State heritage significance as a rich research resource with the ability to provide insight into many aspects of the field of astronomy and the history of its development in NSW.

Linden Observatory Complex was listed on the New South Wales State Heritage Register on 5 March 2010 having satisfied the following criteria.

The place is important in demonstrating the course, or pattern, of cultural or natural history in New South Wales.

The Linden Observatory is of State heritage significance for its historic values. Ken Beames' 24" telescope housed in the custom built observatory was important in the history of telescope making in Australia and NSW as it was the largest Australian made telescope in NSW from the time of its construction in the late 1930s until the 1960s when the 40 inch and 24 inch telescopes at Siding Spring Observatory were designed and constructed. Beames' 24 inch telescope is regarded as one of the most significant amateur built instruments in Australia at the time it was built, and remains so to this day. While amateur instruments of this aperture are becoming more common, instruments of this size with professional standard mounting and drives are not. . The observatory where Beames made his telescopes and other instruments and optics associated with the strudy of astronomy is tangible evidence of the ongoing, strong and productive relationship between the amateur and professional in the field of astronomy from the late 19th century through the 20th century.

The historic significance of the 24-inch telescope is increased by the fact that it was made by one of the very few Australian telescope makers working in Australia at the time. Not withstanding the uniqueness of his telescope making activities Beames was a prolific producer of telescopes producing around 450 instruments ranging from 6 inch telescopes through to the 24-inch telescopes . The 24-inch telescope was also one of the first telescopes in Australia to utilise electric drives to operate the huge telescope and its observatory dome.

The place has a strong or special association with a person, or group of persons, of importance of cultural or natural history of New South Wales's history.

The Linden Observatory is of State heritage significance for its association with Ken Beames who constructed the observatory, its telescopes and the equipment required to make the observatory and instruments. Ken Beames was widely regarded as a master instrument maker responsible for the design and construction of the largest Australian telescope built in NSW before the professionally commissioned telescopes for Siding Spring Observatory in the 1960s. Beames also manufactured other astronomical instruments including the first Australian Made Blink Comparator for Father O'Leary of the Riverview College Observatory.

Beames was an active member of the British Astronomical Association during the 1930s and 40s, although less active in his later life. Those colleagues in the association held him in high regard for his contribution to instrument making in the field as noted in the Journal of the British Astronomical Association " [Ken Beames] was one of Australia's most accomplished telescope makers of the 1930s, 40s and 50s" and "one of NSW's leading amateur astronomers during the 1940' and 50s".

Although not a professional astronomer, Beames skills as a master instrument maker, his telescopes and observatory were highly regarded by his professional and amateur contemporaries.

Ken Beames also made a significant contribution to munitions production during WWII when his rare skills in optics technology were used in the production of lenses for signalling lamps and telescope sightings for the Australian and British Navies. The extent of Beames' contribution in this field is as yet unknown although preliminary investigation of archives, personal reminiscences related by friends and the presence of machinery for mass production of these optical components indicate that his contribution to the production of optics during World War II was sizeable.

The place is important in demonstrating aesthetic characteristics and/or a high degree of creative or technical achievement in New South Wales.

The Linden Observatory is of State heritage significance because of the high level of technical achievement of the telescope construction by an individual practitioner, Ken Beames, which involved masterful skills in multiple engineering disciplines – instrument design, drafting, construction, optical design, mirror making, electronics, electrical engineering, clock making, pattern making, fitting, turning & machining, founding, optical glass casting and lens grinding.

Aspects of the telescope design were, at the time of construction, considered innovative and otherwise only used in professional installations, e.g.: the control of airflow with the telescope tube; the use of clocks to synchronise the motor drive with earth's rotation, full motor control of telescope and dome positioning while observing.

The planetarium started in the late 1950s, while designed with reference to the Zeiss planetariums, is of Ken Beames' own design, built from first principles. It was the first and possibly only attempt to design and construct such a mechanism in Australia and represents a major technical achievement. Other well known planetariums in Australia include the HV McKay Planetarium, an imported Zeiss planetarium installed at the Museum of Victoria in 1965, the Launceston Planetarium, another Zeiss projector installed in 1969 and the South Australian University Zeiss planetarium installed in 1972.

Ken Beames' workshop with its tools and equipment remains intact and includes work pieces, custom made tools, machinery and jigs which demonstrate practical solutions to problems encountered, including the need to mass-produce high precision items, e.g.: sighting telescopes, lens' and parabolic mirrors. All items of Ken Beames' construction, both the central objects such as the planetarium, telescopes and clocks, and the tools he constructed to help make these objects, demonstrate very high levels of multidisciplinary craftsmanship.

The moveable collection of items Beames constructed for private use or as gifts demonstrate high technical achievement and are aesthetically distinctive. The range of items runs from candle holders, brass jewellery boxes and cast bronze vases to detailed miniature working artillery "potato guns", brass grandfather clock, and a book made with brass pages – Rubaiyt of Omar Khayym.

This intact complex is instructive in the study of mechanical & electrical engineering and optics of the mid 20th century and exemplifies the astronomical and general engineering technology and methods of that era.

The place has a strong or special association with a particular community or cultural group in New South Wales for social, cultural or spiritual reasons.

The Linden Observatory is of State social significance afor the long and productive association that Ken Beames shared with amateur and professional astronomers. Many individuals and groups visited the site to learn from Ken Beames. The depth and variety of his demonstrated skills in engineering and telescope-making made a visit to Linden an inspiring experience. Visitors to the site have spoken of visits to the observatory in their childhood which inspired them to pursue careers in science and engineering.

Beames also had a long term association with Jesuit scientists from the Riverview Observatory at Hunters Hill and later the Castel Gandolfo (Vatican Observatory) as well as astronomers at MT Stromlo Observatory and scientists at the CSIRO Physics Lab and many amateur astronomers.

Beames' personal goal over many years was to turn the site into an astronomical education centre, and this is now a prominent goal of the site's trustees. The site is in regular use by amateur and semi-professional astronomers, with a regular beginners group, and regular observing night by the Western Sydney Amateur Astronomy Group (WSAAG). Courses sponsored by the Nepean Community College have been proposed and are being negotiated.

The place has potential to yield information that will contribute to an understanding of the cultural or natural history of New South Wales.

The Linden Observatory is of State significance for its research potential associated with the fabric and its collection of moveable heritage including working design drawings, engineering equipment, telescopes, World War II munitions optics, documentary archive. Significant research opportunities are to be found in the archive in a number of areas such as:

- History of telescope making in Australia
- History of the construction of the Linden telescope
- Manufacture of optical instruments in Australia
- Optical munitions manufacture in WWII in Australia
- Armament manufacture in WWII
- History of amateur astronomy in Australia
- Research into the production of 6", 12" and 24" mirrors on home-made grinding machinery in the 1930s.

The site continues its significant educational function as a place for the practice and teaching of amateur astronomy and telescope making.

The place possesses uncommon, rare or endangered aspects of the cultural or natural history of New South Wales.

The Linden Observatory is of State significance as a rare example of a privately held historic observatory in Australia.Others include Tebbut's observatory in Windsor NSW, Linden, and the Ballarat Observatory in Victoria. Tebbut's observatory is older than Linden, but only housed much smaller instruments purchased by Tebbut. The Ballarat Observatory, which is listed on the Victorian Heritage Register, has a large amateur made historic instrument (the Oddie telescope) and is in this respect comparable to Linden. Linden's collection of associated workshops and material with its extremely high degree of association with the master engineer and instrument maker Ken Beames, and high degree of integrity, makes it unique in Australia.

Amateur built telescopes of this size (24") with professional grade mountings are still a rarity. There are no other examples of amateur built telescopes in NSW. The only older example in Australia is in Victoria at the Ballarat Observatory. The commercial 30" (762 mm) telescope at Linden is the largest publicly accessible instrument in Australia.

The observatory is the closest to Sydney to still have good "dark sky" viewing for most of the viewing field, and the site is used regularly by amateur and semi professional observers for this reason. Sydney observatory, by comparison, has been rendered unusable for all but the brightest objects by light pollution from the city. The 24" (610 mm) reflector at University of Western Sydney is a modern commercial instrument, but its location also makes it prone to light pollution.

The planetarium instrument located at the observatory is an extremely rare example of an Australian made planetarium on this scale in Australia, and perhaps the world.

No other sites of this kind in NSW have the high degree of integrity and completeness of the collection associated with the design and construction of the instruments.

The complex is rare in terms of the collection of tools, machinery, parts, work samples and other material relating to the production of telescopes and optical instruments during WWII. It is unlikely that any comparable site exists.

The place is important in demonstrating the principal characteristics of a class of cultural or natural places/environments in New South Wales.

The Linden Observatory is of State heritage significance because it houses a collection representative of the art of astro-mechanical, optical and other engineering from the 1930s to the 1950s. The extent of the collection, its condition and quality is unique.

The variable star observations for the Flare Star program, and supernova discoveries made at Linden are typical of the work contributed by amateurs. Being a "dark sky" site provides much more potential for high level amateur or semi-professional work to be done at Linden than exists at Sydney Observatory.

The Linden complex is very comparable to the home of the Springfield Telescope Makers "Stellafane" in America. This is a collection of buildings and telescopes on a parcel of land at a similar altitude to Linden, also established around 1920–30. "Stellafane" is listed as a National Historic Landmark for its pioneering role in the development of amateur telescope making and popular astronomy in the United States. It shares a lot in common with Linden, particularly the fact that it was the outcome of the work of one person Russell W. Porter (1871–1949).

== See also ==
- List of astronomical observatories in New South Wales
