= Carrington Hotel, Katoomba =

Carrington Hotel
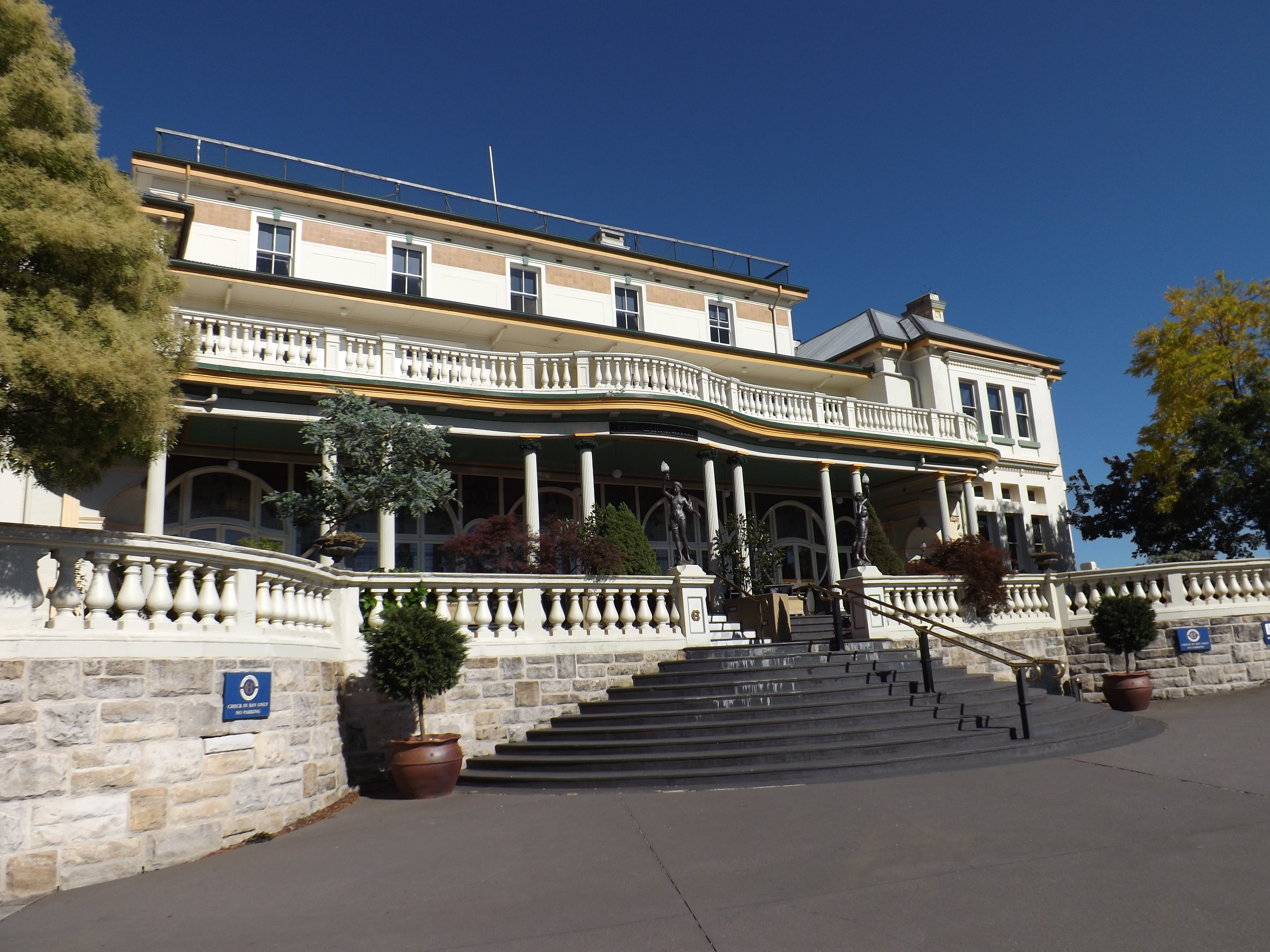

- Location within New South Wales Location within Australia
- 33°42′47″S 150°18′39″E
- Location: Katoomba Street, Katoomba, City of Blue Mountains, New South Wales, Australia

History
- Built: 1882–1913
- Built for: Harry George Rowell

Site notes
- Architects: John Kirkpatrick and Bosser, (1882); Edward Hewlett Hogben (1875–1936) with Goyder Brothers (1911–13)
- Website: thecarrington.com.au

New South Wales Heritage Register
- Official name: Carrington Hotel; Great Western Hotel
- Type: State heritage (complex / group)
- Designated: 2 April 1999
- Reference no.: 280
- Type: Hotel
- Category: Commercial
- Builders: F. Drewett (1882); Howie, Brown and Moffit (1912–13)

The Carrington Hotel is a heritage-listed former spa, hotel and power station and now hotel and public bar located at Katoomba Street, Katoomba in the Blue Mountains region of New South Wales, Australia. It was designed by John Kirkpatrick and Bosser in 1882; and by Edward Hewlett Hogben with Goyder Brothers in 1911–13; and built from 1882 to 1913 by F. Drewett in 1882; and by Howie, Brown and Moffit in 1912–13. It is also known as Great Western Hotel. The property is privately owned. It was added to the New South Wales State Heritage Register on 2 April 1999.

The Carrington is the only 19th century grand resort hotel still in use in New South Wales. It also retains much of the fabric of its major phases of development and continues to occupy the commanding position in Katoomba that it has done since its construction. It was built in 1883 by Harry George Rowell, a large hotel owner from Sydney, and was owned by a series of prominent families over the next century. Today it is still operating as a hotel.

== History ==
The original land grant of 20 hectares (50 acres) was made to James Henry Neal on 10 October 1877 under the provisions of the Volunteer Force Regulation Act 1867. On 8 January 1881 the land was transferred to Frederick Clissold of Ashfield, who subdivided the entire portion.

=== The Victorian era ===
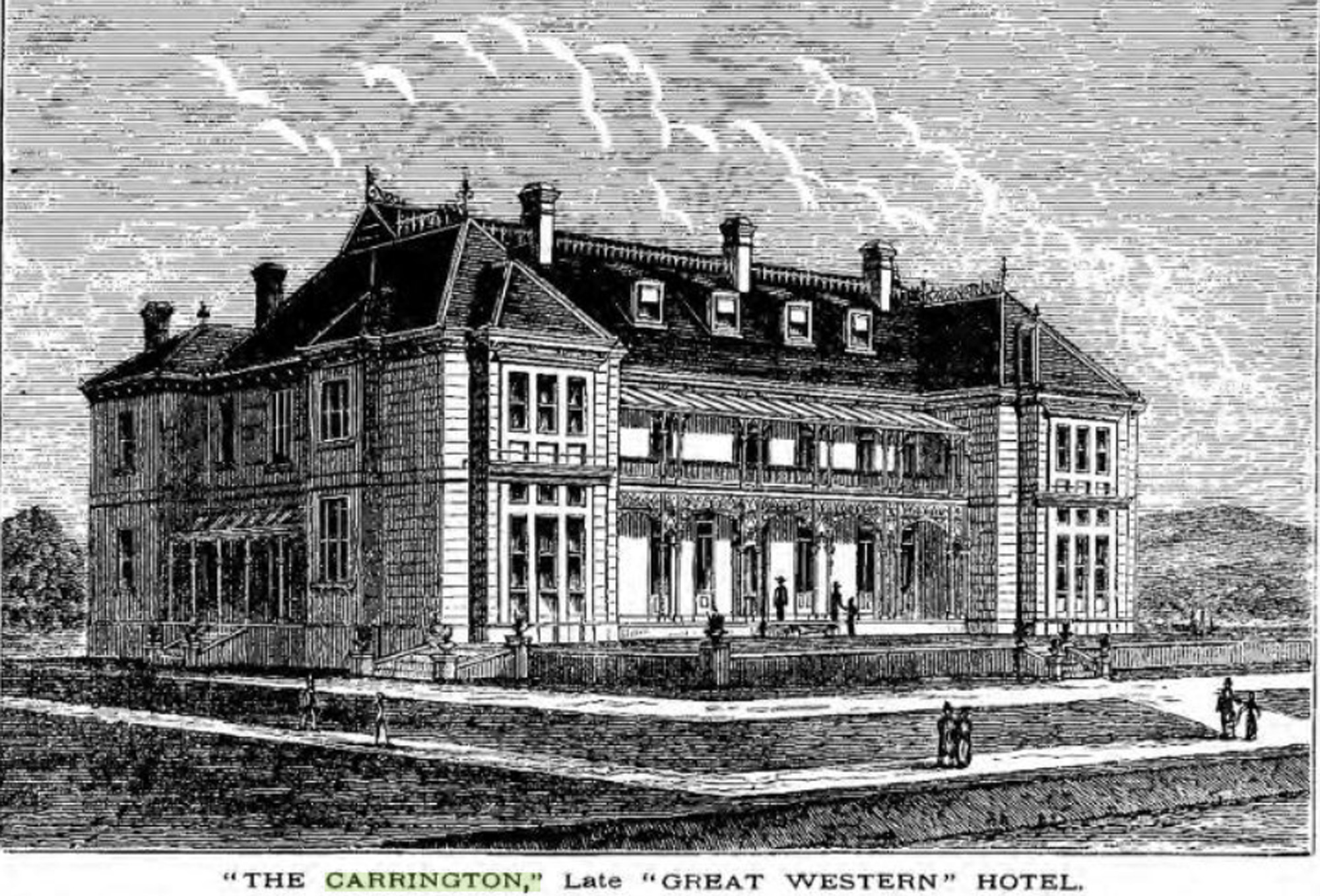
The Carrington Hotel shortly after it was built before the alterations and additions

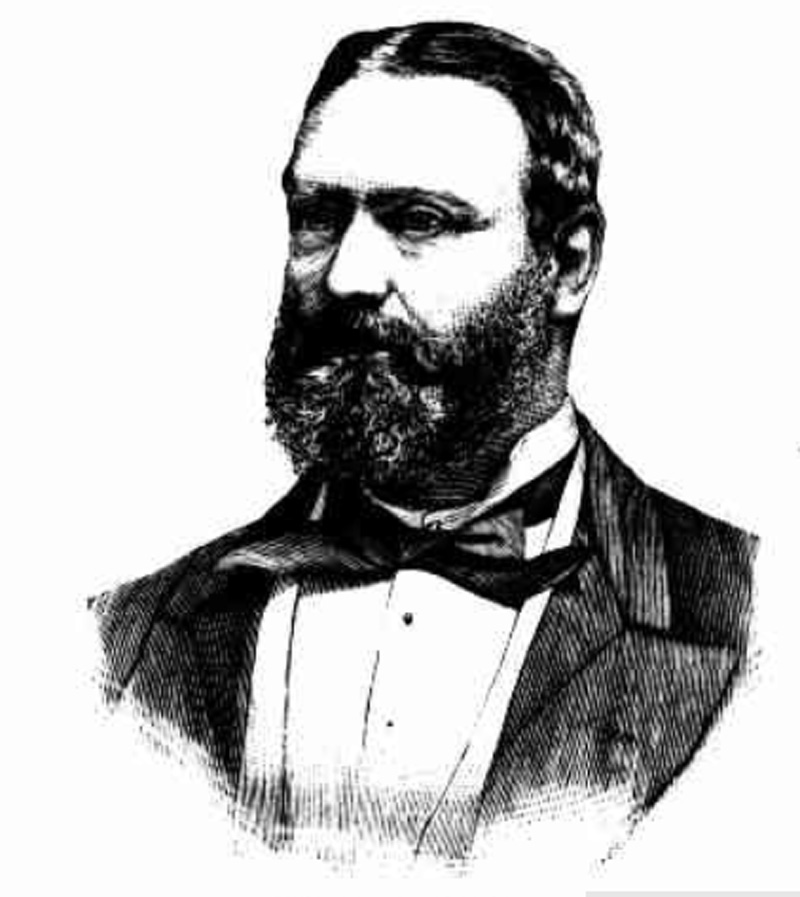
Frederick Charles Goyder

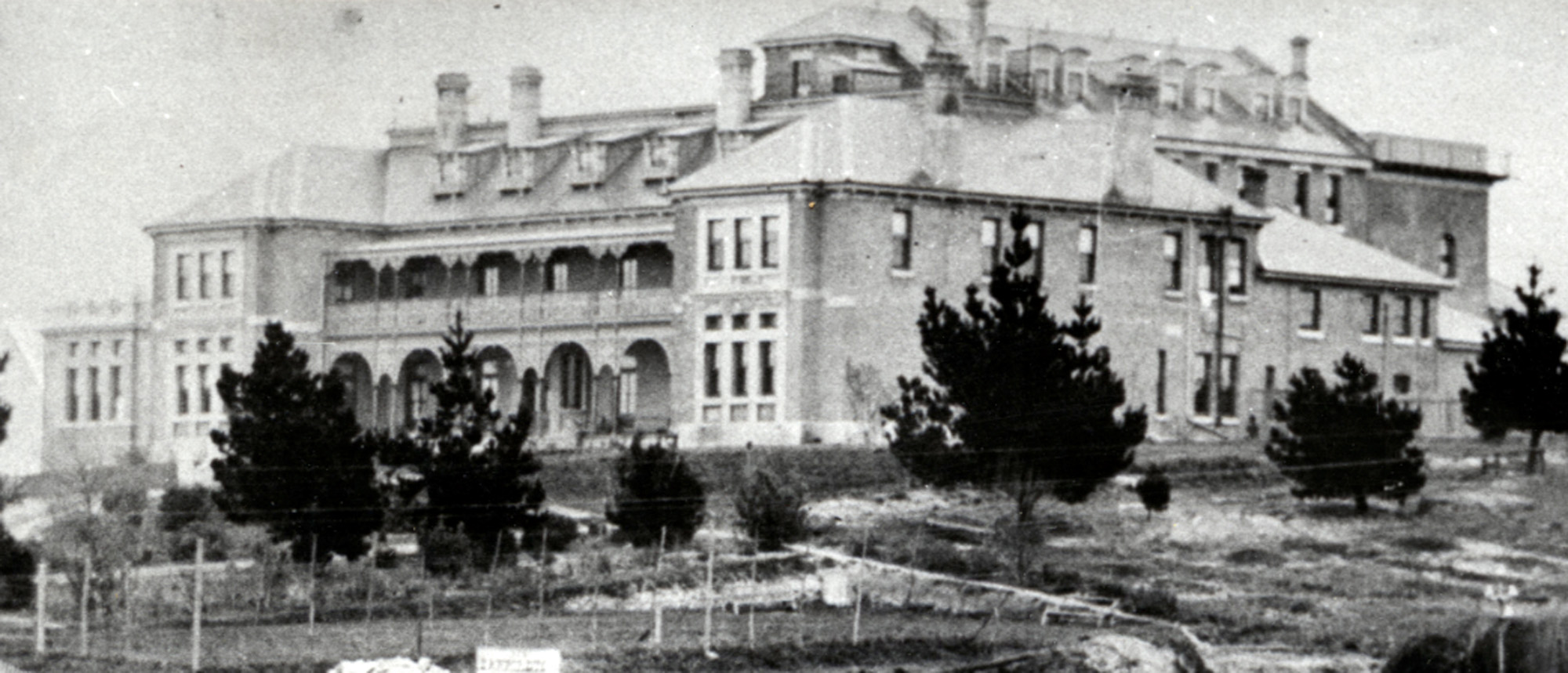
The Carrington Hotel 1890 after the changes described were made

Tenders were called for the Western Star Hotel by J. Kirkpatrick of Kirkpatrick & Bossler, architects in September 1881. On 18 January 1882 Lots 10-15 of Section 2 was transferred to Harry George Rowell. The same year the hotel was constructed by F. Drewett, a builder from Lithgow, opening as the Great Western Hotel. The hotel was originally a large Victorian building called the "Great Western Hotel" with wrought iron lacework at the front. It was built in 1883 by Harry George Rowell (1827–1885). Rowell was born in England in 1827. His father James Rowell was an innkeeper in Hertford. He went to India in about 1845 and lived in Bombay for over thirty years working in the English Civil Service. In the late 1870s he migrated to Sydney with his wife Frances and their children and became the owner of the Oxford Hotel in King Street which was a large Victorian establishment (since demolished).

Tenders were called later in 1882 by Kirkpatrick for additions to the hotel, possibly the stone wing. On 24 April 1883 Rowell purchased Lots 1 & 2 of Section 2 of Deposited Plan 292 from Frederick Clissold. In 1884 the Great Western Hotel is described as accommodating seventy to eighty persons with nearly sixty rooms. Rowell died in 1885. On 9 September 1886 Thomas Frederick Thompson and Henry Moses, wine and spirit merchants, exercised Power of Sale under their Mortgage of 1 July 1885 and transferred the property to James Hunt and Henry Thorpe, hotelkeepers. On 6 October 1887 the property was leased to Frederick Charles Goyder (1826–1900) of Katoomba.

Goyder was born in 1826 in Tewkesbury in Gloucestershire. In 1856 he married Emily Stredwick in London and shortly after left England and came to Victoria. He was for many years landlord of the Victoria Hotel in Bourke Street. He was also closely connected to the sporting community and owned several racehorses one of whom was the champion called "Sussex". The couple had five sons and one daughter and for 25 years lived in Melbourne. With his hotel and sporting interests Frederick became very prosperous. In 1881 he and his sons decided to sell all their Melbourne interests and buy a sheep property in the Warrego region of NSW. However this was not a success and when he had the chance to take over the hotel he seized the opportunity. With the permission of Lord Carrington who visited the premises in 1886 in his capacity as Governor of NSW Carrington gave permission for Goyder to change its name to The Carrington Hotel.

From 1885 Carrington began to make additions to the premises including an additional wing, dining hall, two drawing rooms and a music room, resulting in 119 bedrooms and seven suites of rooms, two tennis courts and flower and vegetable gardens.. He told a newspaper reporter in 1890 of the improvements he had made. The article read:

"Among the additions and improvements to the building are the following — a wing built (in 1886) of cut stone, and having a southerly aspect, consisting of 20 single rooms, and called 'the bachelors' wing.' Early in 1888 Mr. Goyder, having taken advantage of his right, purchased the hotel, and, finding the accommodation insufficient, added 50 more rooms. This addition stands in the courtyard and is joined to the main building. It is higher than the remaining portions of the hotel and adds to the imposing appearance of the pile. A music-room has also been added to the drawing room, and is separated from it by large folding doors. The floor of the music room is of polished tallow-wood, and is partly covered with Austrian rugs, which are easily removed for dancing. The piano is a Brinsmead, and is considered one of the finest grands; its tone is full and soft. The dining hall is also new; it measures 60ft, by 40ft. The floor is carpeted, and everything conducive to comfort is present. The ceiling is lofty, the lighting good, and the table decorations and menu leave nothing to be desired. This hall is capable of seating 200 guests. There are now 135 rooms in the hotel, among which are seven suites of private apartments, most comfortably furnished and conveniently situated, including one of the prettiest bridal suites to be found in the colonies."

On 30 April 1888 the property was transferred to F. C. Goyder and mortgaged to Hunt and Thorpe. In 1890 Goyder became the first Mayor of Katoomba and the hotel continued to prosper. On 10 March 1898 the mortgage was transferred to Henry Thorpe and Sydney Mansfield Rowell. On 24 July 1899 the property was leased to William Frederick Goyder, son of F. C. Goyder. F. C. Goyder died in 1900 and a year later Arthur Lawrence Peacock became the proprietor on 19 September 1901. The mortgage was foreclosed on 19 September 1901 and ownership passed to Thorpe and Rowell.

=== After 1900 ===
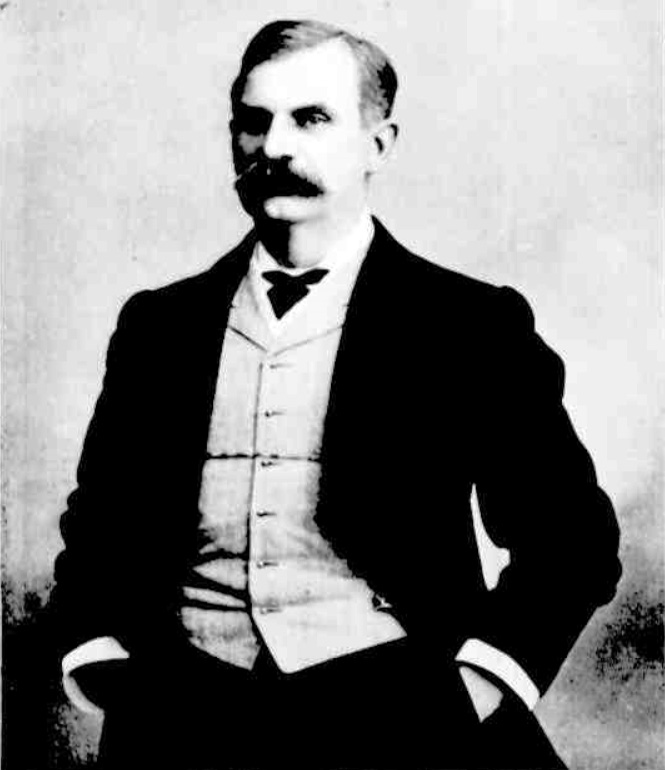
Sir James Joynton Smith 1909

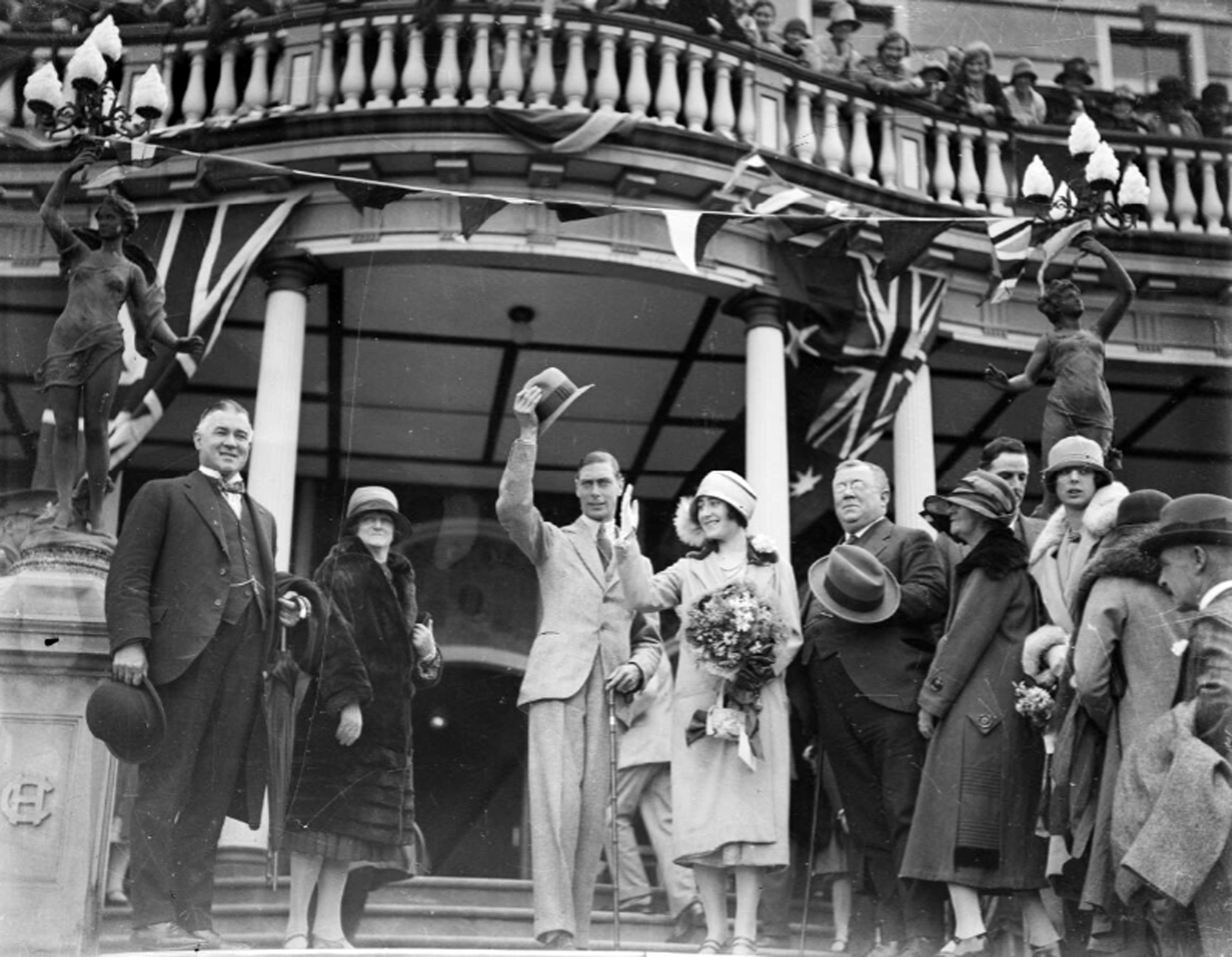
The Duke and Duchess of York (later King George VI and Elizabeth the Queen Mother) at the Carrington Hotel in 1927

Arthur Lawrence Peacock (1861–1913) was the owner between 1901 and 1911. During this time he carried out several alterations mostly relating to redecoration. The power station at the back of the Carrington Hotel was built in 1910. It provided the first electricity supply not only to the Carrington Hotel but also to Katoomba and other Blue Mountains towns. The octagonal brick chimney remains an important Katoomba landmark.

Between 1904 and 1911 Peacock carried out various alterations and additions, mostly redecoration and including services of lavatories, baths and water closets on each floor. In 1908 Edward, Prince of Wales stayed at the hotel. In 1911 Sir James Joynton Smith bought the hotel. From this time major alterations were made to the building. One of these is the famous art nouveau stained glass façade at the front of the hotel. In 1917 Laurel Pardey was playing at the hotel when she was spotted by George Horton. Horton employed both Laurel and her sister Edith Emma Pardey and they became well known as their arrangements were published on piano rolls.

In 1927 Sir James Joynton Smith made further major additions which were described in a feature article in a building journal. Many famous people visited the hotel including the Duke and Duchess of York (later King George VI and Elizabeth the Queen Mother). A photo of this event in 1927 is shown.

Sir John Joynton Smith (1858–1943) was born in London in 1858. His father was a master brass fitter. He worked in his father's shop for some time and tried several other jobs before signing on as a cabin boy on a steamer. He worked on ships until 1874 when he settled in New Zealand. Here he prospered as an hotelier in Wellington.

In 1890 he came to Sydney In 1892–96 he managed the Grand Central Coffee Palace Hotel in Clarence Street. In 1893 he married Nellie Eloise Parkes whose family were experienced hoteliers. In 1896, by now known as Joynton Smith, he laid the foundation of his fortune when he leased, the run-down Imperial Arcade Hotel, renamed the Arcadia, between Pitt and Castlereagh streets and turned it into a good residential establishment. He continued to acquire properties and in the Blue Mountains as well as buying the Carrington Hotel he also bought the Imperial Hotel at Mount Victoria and leased the Hydro Majestic. He loved motor cars and owned many including a Pierce Arrow, Bentley, Cadillac, Rolls-Royce and Lasalle, and invested in a company selling them. He was a very flamboyant man and did magic tricks, sang comic Cockney songs and played the concertina. He smoked cigars but rarely drank alcohol. He enjoyed boxing, kept fit with a masseur and sauna and was a good billiards player. He owned three mansions in Sydney one of which was called Hastings at Coogee Beach. He died here in 1843. Although in a time of decline in Mountains tourism, The Carrington remained popular through the 1950s and 1960s.

On 18 December 1967 the property was transferred to six people, one of whom was Theodore Constantine Morris, a property developer, who held a half share. On 5 May 1969 the entire property was transferred to Morris. In 1968 the swimming pool was constructed and a general redecoration was undertaken.

During the later years of the 20th century elements such as the pergola, trellis and some garden beds were removed and the swimming pool (since filled in) were added to the upper terrace. New trees were planted, some, e.g. the Himalayan cedars (Cedrus deodara) placed with respect for the symmetrical nature of the 1911-13 design and others planted seemingly at random. From the 1960s onwards there was a gradual erosion in the level of garden maintenance, resulting in a loss of detail. The introduction of public bus shelters on Katoomba Street in front of the early 20th century stone wall of the Carrington Hotel obscured and detracted from traditional views to the place.

The hotel was closed in 1986 under then owner Theo Morris for non-compliance with fire regulations. It was boarded up, and remained empty and derelict until 1991 when it was purchased with the aim of restoring and relaunching it to its former glory.

=== Revival ===
In 1992, Geoffrey Leach, a building contractor, began a process of restoration said to have cost rather less than $8m. In December 1998, the ground floor and one floor of guest rooms was re-opened, with other areas following as progress and finances permitted. Mr. Leach would not say what the restoration has cost, but claims it is less than the "$6m to $8m" he says is being spent on that other fabulous mountains hotel, the Hydro Majestic Hotel.

Leach's first task was to restore the pub at the driveway's entry on Katoomba Street, which has been generating income for the project for some years now. Inside the hotel, the art nouveau windows to the enclosed verandah have been replicated and the black and white tiled bathrooms - many with original fittings - restored. Upstairs one large room - the "treasure room" - was used to stockpile any original items - light fittings, clocks, items of furniture, a pair of genuine Ming vases, and the silver plate that now sits in a glass-fronted cupboard in the dining room. Vast Victorian oil paintings went off for cleaning and restoration, chandeliers were cleaned and re-hung, silver polished, clocks returned to working order, and pieces of furniture copied for the guest rooms (the bedheads even have the CH logo).

In 2002 a master plan for a new town square was approved and implemented, partly imposing inside the Carrington's lower garden and involving its redesign, relocation of the intrusive bus shelters, ramps, paving and widespread replanting. In 2004 Leach's interest was purchased by Michael Brischetto and Mark Jarvis, who announced ambitious new plans for a backpackers' hostel, a large number of bedrooms, new retail facilities and a drive-through bottle shop in the former power house. The partners have achieved some of these aims, while also devoting their energies to the conservation of the hotel's original fabric. In July 2010 a bottle shop was opened in the former boiler room of the power house facing Parke Street. This involved the stabilisation of portions of the internal and external fabric of the structure.

== Description ==
=== Grounds ===
The Carrington Hotel is sited on top of a small rise above and adjoining the main shopping street and railway station of Katoomba. The hotel's northern main entrance is landscaped with sweeping drives from Katoomba Street to the portico or colonnade of its front doors, terraced gardens and mature trees including two bunya pines (Araucaria bidwillii) on the southern upper slope, silver birch (Betula pendula) and Himalayan cedar (Cedrus deodara) on the upper northern slope.

Broadly the upper terraces and flanks of the hotel car parking areas are shrubberies and the lower terrace is grassed, with direct stairs connecting to the footpath on Katoomba Street.

=== Power Station ===
The power station at the rear of the Carrington Hotel was built in 1910. It provided the first electricity supply not only to the Carrington Hotel but also to Katoomba and other Blue Mountains towns. The building features load bearing brick walls, in two wings, one of which is rendered. The south wing has the letters KATOOMBA ELECTRIC SUPPLY on the lintels and other decorative brick detailing. The octagonal brick chimney appears to be in good condition, apart from the loss of a few bricks from its top. It is an important Katoomba landmark. A boiler which was in use until recently remains within the power station. An earlier horizontal boiler was removed when the current boiler was installed. The latter, which remains intact, has a name plate: D.H. Berghouse Ultimo. It is reported to have been brought from Sydney by rail, having previously operated in the Arcadia Hotel. It is constructed of riveted steel plates and features six "spy holes". Various tools for raking etc. remain nearby.

=== Hotel ===
The Carrington Hotel is a four-storey architectural conglomeration dating from 1882, with numerous later additions. It is one of the finest resort hotels in the State with several outstanding features. The facade is richly decorated, its undulating Italianate balcony is set on columns over a paved piazza. A wall of stained glass encloses the former verandah and provides an excellent example of Art Nouveau glazing.

The Central Dining Hall is an impressive interior space, measuring 12 by 18 metres (40 by 60 ft) in size, with an enriched panelled plaster ceiling, timber dado, high columns and a row of windows to either side, each a panel of etched glass with stained glass surround. The Billiard Room and adjoining double lounge area are robustly detailed, with arched brick fireplaces and stained glass windows. The former Library is panelled and beamed in Edwardian taste and is complete with wide shelves for display of china and lead glazed bookshelves. The ballroom was decorated in the twenties after the Adam style. Present Cocktail Lounge is illuminated by an Art Nouveau stained glass dome. Two bronze torches in the central hall. The "wing" Bedroom Suites' of 1927 are impressive, each with its own bathroom, built-in wardrobe and leaded and coloured glass window. Small Lounges in the bedroom areas are typically furnished with writing desks, long settees and central ottomans. Bathrooms in the main building have exotic Art Nouveau glazing to their doors. The hotel also retains many interesting pieces of furniture and fittings, including the intriguing "needle" showers dating from c. 1913.

=== Condition ===
As of 9 December 2013, the physical condition is good.

The documentary evidence available for the Carrington Hotel garden fronting Katoomba Street indicates several phases of modification of the grounds. Physical evidence of older features such as terracing/ paths, site of the croquet lawn and tennis court still survive and is evident in some of the surface contours, especially in the area of the Lower Terrace.

There are also areas of former hard-paved surfaces, kerbing and guttering along the driveway loop. Particularly notable are the four remaining, handsome stone gate posts at the northern entry on Katoomba Street. The site and foundations of a fifth post (removed from the drive in the 1970s but with fabric still present within the grounds) may survive archaeologically. The driveway was realigned in 1912, and archaeological evidence relevant to that alteration may also be present.

Landscape archaeology may also be expected to be able to clarify matters such as the presence and extent of sub-surface features such as the edge of the central garden path, and precise position of now vanished structures such as the timber pergola, tennis court, garden plantings and garden edges.

It remains much of the fabric of its major phases of development.

=== Modifications and dates ===
- 1882 – construction commenced
- 1883 – construction completed
- 1887–1889 – additional wing, dining hall, two drawing rooms and music rooms
- 1904–1911 – various alterations, redecorations, including lavatories, baths and water closets on each floor
- 1911–1912 – new Main Street bar, motor garage at rear and new driveways
- 1912–1913 – construction of stone and wrought iron gates to Katoomba Street, front terrace, steps and balcony, stained glass to verandah, pine trees removed and garden redesigned
- 1923–1927 – attic bedrooms enlarged, flat roof terrace built, additional bedrooms at southern end, dining room enlarged, lift installed. Western end of original north wing demolished and new wing added with 23 bedrooms. Walls removed to create cocktail lounge and ballroom.
- 1970s – fifth front gate entry post removed (to widen entry)
- 1993 – Repainting, lighting, carpet and doors and fireplaces restored.
- 2002 – front garden redevelopment for Carrington Place town square, lowering of ground levels of old tennis court to provide flat area near street, part demolition of front wall to build new entry steps, new side entries off driveways, new paving and planting of lower front garden, new lighting, new public artworks.

== Heritage listing ==
As at 30 September 1997, The Carrington Hotel is the only 19th century grand resort hotel still in use in NSW. It retains much of the fabric of its major phases of development and continues to occupy the commanding position in Katoomba that it has done since 1882. The buildings and grounds represent a wealth of evidence of attitudes to leisure and hotel operation in the late 19th and early 20th centuries. They also reflect the history of Katoomba and the work of a succession of notable families, and the lifestyle of the Blue Mountains as a recreation area during its period of greatest activity.

The garden and grounds of the Carrington Hotel have high historic, aesthetic, social and technical importance as an integral component – the essential visual and functional setting – of a rare example of a grand late 19th–early 20th century resort hotel of State significance in a town setting, with an early 20th century garden layout containing important surviving elements of its design that is largely intact in its extent. The underlying structure of the garden demonstrates the principal characteristics of an early 20th century design retaining aspects of the earlier garden including 1890s–early 1900s mature plantings of bunya pine (Araucaria bidwillii), Monterey pine (Pinus radiata), a bull bay (Magnolia grandiflora), London plane (Platanus × hispanica), beech (Fagus sylvatica) trees, with additional surviving Interwar additions, the gazebos, rose garden and stone seat.

The location of the Carrington at virtually the highest point in Katoomba and the sweeping approach, drives and lawns and prominent mature plantings have made the hotel an important landmark in the town from the time it was built.

The grounds of the Carrington, particularly the forecourt to Katoomba Street, have significance to the local community as a place for gathering to mark special community events such as the re-enactment in 1951 of the first crossing of the Blue Mountains in 1813.

The documentary evidence available for the Carrington Hotel garden fronting Katoomba Street indicates several phases of modification of the grounds. Physical evidence of older features such as terracing/ paths, the site of the croquet lawn and tennis court still survives and is evident in some of the surface contours, especially in the area of the lower terrace where it is proposed to put a new Town Square.

There are also areas of former hard paved surfaces, kerbing and guttering along the driveway loop. Particularly notable are the four remaining, handsome sandstone gatte posts at the northern entry on Katoomba Street. The site and foundations of a fifth post (removed from the drive in the 1970s but with fabric still present within the grounds) may survive archaeologically. The driveway was realigned in 1912, and archaeological evidence relevant to that alteration may also be present.

Landscape archaeology may also be expected to be able to clarify matters such as the presence and extent of sub-surface features such as the edge of the central garden path, and precise position of now-vanished structures such as the timber pergola, tennis court, garden plantings and garden edges.

(excerpt): The completion of the monitoring work yielded some significant archaeological and structural remains, including surfaces relevant to the former tennis court, site drainage systems and other evidence relevant to earlier entrances/driveways... The results obtained during monitoring indicate that within the grounds of the Carrington Hotel, the predicted physical evidence survived intact below more modern layers. More primary physical evidence and archaeological material is likely to survive in the Upper Terrace area (not dealt with in the current project) and elsewhere across the site. The predicted high potential of some areas of the site as assessed in prior heritage studies and in the Archaeological Assessment Report has been confirmed by the archaeological work completed.

The Carrington Power Station is one of few surviving privately owned and established small country power stations. It is particularly significant because it provided the first electricity supply in the Blue Mountains. The station boiler (the second to be used) remains in situ and was operated until recently. The chimney is an integral part of the power station complex and has for many years been a prominent Katoomba landmark.

Carrington Hotel was listed on the New South Wales State Heritage Register on 2 April 1999 having satisfied the following criteria.

The place is important in demonstrating the course, or pattern, of cultural or natural history in New South Wales.

The original building was one of the earliest sizeable buildings on Katoomba. The building of this and other large hotels and guest houses acted as a catalyst for the development of the town, which expanded considerably during the 1890s and appointed a municipality in 1899. The hotel has been closely associated with the continuing history of Katoomba and the whole of the Blue Mountains area, from the time it was built until the present day. In its various stages of development it constitutes a physical record of the history of the area, in particular the growth and decline of the Blue Mountains as a fashionable tourist resort.

The front garden and grounds of the Carrington Hotel are of high significance as essential and integral components of the site, which as a whole is of importance in the cultural history of NSW for its links with key social and historical events and themes.

The significance of the site is considerably enhanced by the extent to which its early layout, features, fabric and relationships have been retained (albeit in somewhat poor condition). The site, in fact retains essential evidence of its important late 19th and early 20th century character. This includes the overall layout, sandstone walling and gateposts, terracing, remnant garden edging and bollards, established by 1911–13 and retaining aspects of the earlier garden including 1890s–early 1900s mature plantings of Araucaria bidwilli, Pinus radiata, a Magnolia grandiflora, the plane and beech tree. Additional elements-gazebos, the stone seat and rose garden were added by the 1920s. The extensive documentary records of the garden area also attest to its past importance and renown while also providing an essential reference point for conservation.

The hotel complex as a whole is a rare surviving example of large Victorian / Edwardian resort hotel within a small town setting, and more particularly one of the few to retain so significant a garden setting to its main frontage as regards both its size and detailing. Comparing it with similar sites within the local area, only the Hydro Majestic, Medlow Bath and Caves House, Jenolan Caves are of similar vintage, scale and historical importance but neither have the important civic context of the Carrington or the strong design aesthetic – comprising built and landscape elements – of its garden.

The early introduction (1889) of a tennis court as a component of the grounds demonstrates the evolving role of recreation in nineteenth century resorts.

The documentary evidence available for the Carrington Hotel garden fronting Katoomba Street indicates several phases of modification of the grounds. Physical evidence of older features such as terracing/ paths, site of the croquet lawn and tennis court still survive and is evident in some of the surface contours, especially in the area of the Lower Terrace.

There are also areas of former hard-paved surfaces, kerbing and guttering along the driveway loop. Particularly notable are the four remaining, handsome stone gate posts at the northern entry on Katoomba Street. The site and foundations of a fifth post (removed from the drive in the 1970s but with fabric still present within the grounds) may survive archaeologically. The driveway was realigned in 1912, and archaeological evidence relevant to that alteration may also be present.

Landscape archaeology may also be expected to be able to clarify matters such as the presence and extent of sub-surface features such as the edge of the central garden path, and precise position of now vanished structures such as the timber pergola, tennis court, garden plantings and garden edges.

The place is important in demonstrating aesthetic characteristics and/or a high degree of creative or technical achievement in New South Wales.

The Carrington Hotel has always occupied a prominent position in the town of Katoomba and, despite the growth of development along Katoomba Street, is still a notable landmark on the top of the plateau on which the town is built. Architecturally, the outstanding features include the Italianate balcony at the front, the richly decorated dining hall, and the impressive Art Nouveau glazing, notably in the enclosed verandah and cocktail dome. Of particular architectural interest is the range of styles to be found throughout the building, corresponding to the prevailing taste of the various buildings of development.

The landscaped gardens and grounds of the Carrington Hotel have high aesthetic importance arising from their role as the essential visual and functional setting of a grand late 19th - early 20th century hotel complex of State significance.

The underlying structure of the garden, which was designed from the outset as an integral component of the hotel and evolved to complement the changes to the building, clearly demonstrates the principal characteristics of its early twentieth century layout and character, the period of its primary importance as a garden, as documented in numerous contemporary photographs. The garden was recognised in its own day as a fine example of a semi formal garden with well disposed flowerbeds, borders and shrubberies. Surviving elements from the interwar years – including structures such as the gazebos and stone seat, provide evidence of the later uses of the garden which reinforce, rather than obscure the original character.

Within the context of early resort hotels throughout the state, the grounds of Carrington remain, despite their dilapidated condition, a good representative example of grand gardens designed as an integral component of these sites / places to provide both a decorative setting for buildings and the recreational areas / facilities for patrons. As an early twentieth century example of a grand hotel in a town setting, the Carrington's garden and grounds are now unusual.

The garden and grounds have a more locally based aesthetic significance for their landmark mature plantings – especially the bunya-bunya pines (Araucaria bidwilli) – as well as constructed elements particularly the chimney stack, sandstone walling and gates on Katoomba Street, all of which contribute readily recognisable components to the Katoomba town centre / streetscape.

The location of the Carrington Hotel at virtually the highest point in Katoomba and the sweeping approach drives, open lawns and prominent mature plantings have made the hotel an important landmark in the town from the time it was built. This is a pivotal component of the character of an early twentieth century mountain resort for which Katoomba is valued.

The place has a strong or special association with a particular community or cultural group in New South Wales for social, cultural or spiritual reasons.

The present building embodies their cultural attitudes over the century or so since it was built. The Carrington Hotel is symbolic of the importance of the Blue Mountains as a nationally recognized recreation area, and highly evocative of the lifestyle of the area during its period of greatest activity. The hotel also contains many items of furniture, fittings and ornaments which reflect the taste and technology of their period.

The Carrington Hotel has importance on a local level for its association with the career of prominent landscape gardener Paul Sorenson as the first place he worked in the Blue Mountains and NSW.

The garden and grounds have social significance on a local level for public appreciation of their mature plantings, especially the bunya-bunya pines (Araucaria bidwillii), chimney stack, sandstone walling, and gates on Katoomba Street, and for their contribution to the Katoomba streetscape. Their size, layout, and remnant character are noted for providing green space and serving as evidence of the past role of the hotel and the town.

The grounds of Carrington, particularly the forecourt to Katoomba Street, have significance to the local community as a place for gathering to mark special community events such as the re-enactment in 1951 of the first crossing of the Blue Mountains in 1813.

The place has potential to yield information that will contribute to an understanding of the cultural or natural history of New South Wales.

The front garden / grounds of the Carrington Hotel have considerable potential to provide information on earlier uses, layout and features of the site including key elements such as terracing, paths, croquet lawn and tennis courts, road and kerb detailing, gates and fences.

The documentary evidence available indicates several phases of modification on the grounds. Physical evidence of older features such as terracing / paths, site of the croquet lawn and tennis court still survives and is evident in the surface contours, especially in the area of the grounds between the front of the main hotel and Katoomba Street. There are also areas of former hard-paved surfaces, kerb and guttering along the driveway and features such as the handsome gateposts. Blocks from the removed gate post are also extant. Landscape archaeology may also be expected to be able to clarify matters such as the precise position of now vanished plantings.

The place possesses uncommon, rare or endangered aspects of the cultural or natural history of New South Wales.

The Carrington Hotel is the only 19th century grand resort hotel still in use in NSW and probably Australia.

== See also ==
- Australian non-residential architectural styles
