= 2024 Blue Mountains City Council election =

- 14 September 2024

All 12 seats on Blue Mountains City Council 7 seats needed for a majority
- Registered: 60,045
- Turnout: 84.1%

	First party	Second party	Third party
			IND
Leader	Mark Greenhill	N/A	N/A
Party	Labor	Greens	Independents
Leader's seat	Ward 4	N/A	N/A
Last election	6 seats	2 seats	1 seat
Seats before	6	2	1
Seats won	9	2	1
Seat change	▲3	Steady	Steady
Primary vote	29,052	11,000	4,329
Percentage	63.9%	24.2%	9.5%
Swing	▲14.7	▲9.3	▼2.3
- Results by ward

The 2024 Blue Mountains City Council election was held on 14 September 2024 to elect twelve councillors to the City of Blue Mountains. The election was held as part of the statewide local government elections in New South Wales.

The Labor Party gained an outright majority, winning nine seats. The Liberal Party lost all two seats it held prior to the election, owing to a missed candidate nomination deadline which prevented its councillors from recontesting.

== Background ==
Ward 2 councillor Brendan Christie resigned from the Liberal Party on 3 July 2023. He resigned as a councillor less than two months later and his seat was left vacant until the election.

== Electoral system ==
Like in all other New South Wales local government areas (LGAs), Blue Mountains City Council elections use optional preferential voting. Under this system, voters are only required to vote for one candidate or group, although they can choose to preference other candidates.

All elections for councillor positions are elected using proportional representation. Lake Macquarie has an Australian Senate-style ballot paper with above-the-line and below-the-line voting. The council is divided into four wards, each electing three councillors.

The election was conducted by the New South Wales Electoral Commission (NSWEC).

== Retiring councillors ==
=== Liberal ===
- Kevin Schreiber (Ward 1) – announced 24 July 2024

== Candidates ==
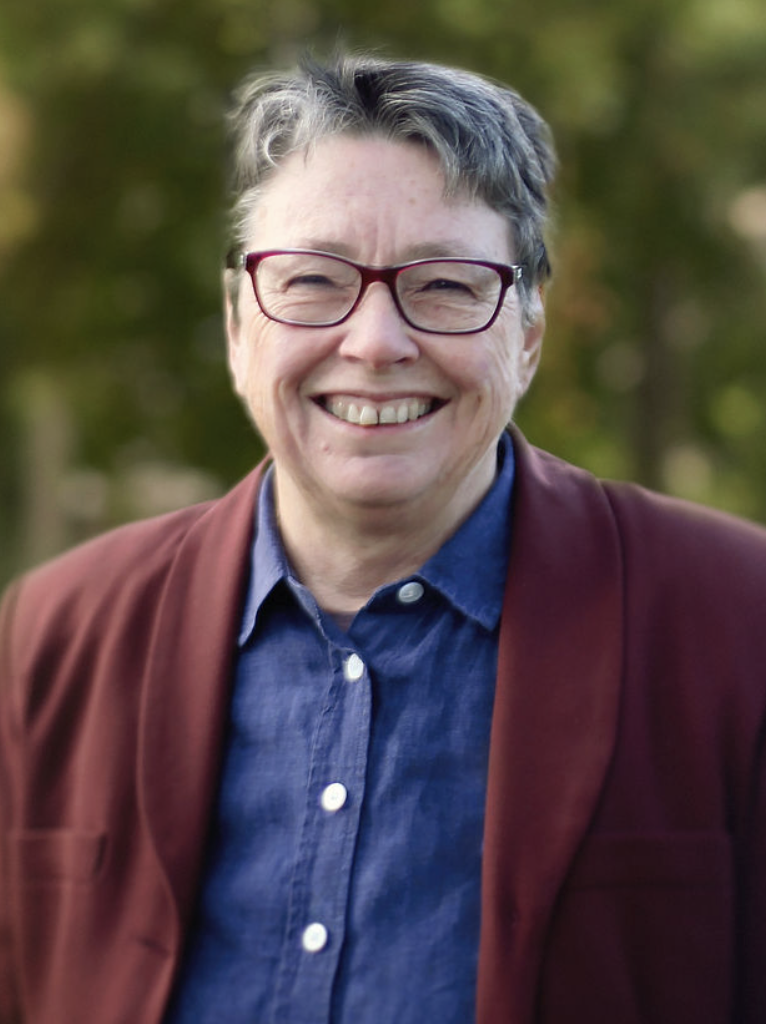
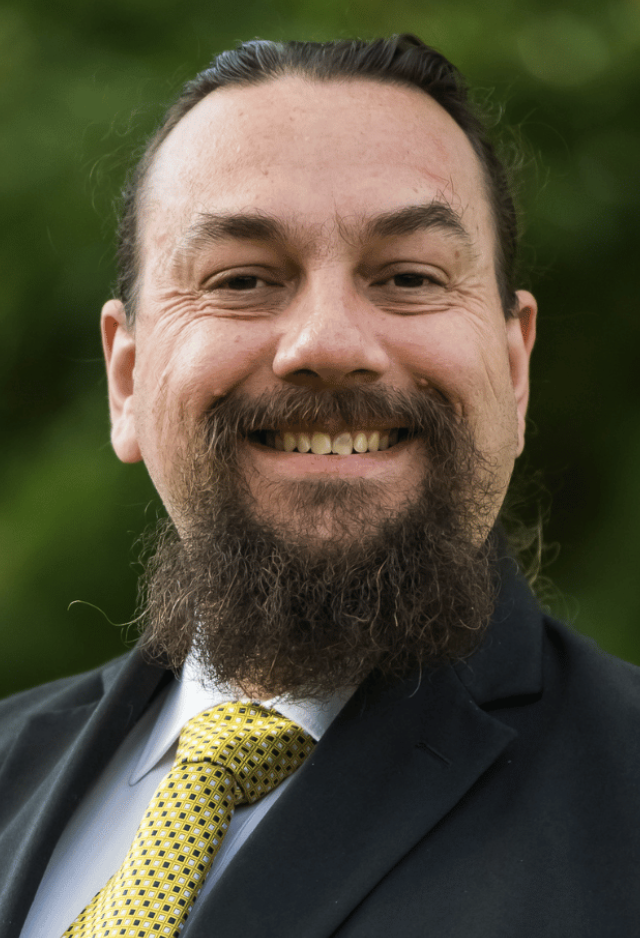
Sarah Redshaw (Greens councillor for Ward 1) and Joaquim De Lima (Libertarian candidate for Ward 2)

On 14 August 2024, the day that candidates nominations closed, the Liberal Party revealed they had missed the deadline to nominate 164 candidates in 16 different LGAs. This included all Liberal councillors seeking re-election to Blue Mountains City Council.

=== Ward 1 ===
Greens (Group A)	Labor (Group B)
1. Sarah Redshaw; 2. Melanie-Ann Turner; 3. Kathleen Herbert	1. Suzie van Opdorp; 2. Suzanne Jamieson; 3. David Forbes

=== Ward 2 ===
Labor (Group A)	Greens (Group B)	Ungrouped
1. Romola Hollywood; 2. Claire West; 3. Paul Gannon	1. Brent Hoare; 2. Jenna Condie; 3. Sandra Warn	Joaquim De Lima (LP)

=== Ward 3 ===
Independent (Group A)	Greens (Group B)	Labor (Group C)
1. Daniel Myles; 2. Shawn Hull; 3. Jakalin Hull	1. Sarah O'Carrigan; 2. Angelika Treichler; 3. Michael Ord	1. Darren Rodrigo; 2. Mick Fell; 3. Ramona Kennedy

=== Ward 4 ===
Labor (Group A)	Greens (Group B)
1. Mark Greenhill; 2. Nyree Fisher; 3. Margaret Buckham	1. William Gruner; 2. Jennifer Brown; 3. Noel Willis

=== Withdrawn candidates ===
Party	Candidate	Ward	Details
Liberal	Rita Fisher	Ward 1	Candidate unable to contest because of missed nomination deadline.
Liberal	Sophie Bruce	Ward 2	Candidate unable to contest because of missed nomination deadline.
Liberal	Roza Sage	Ward 3	Incumbent councillor unable to recontest because of missed candidacy deadline.
Liberal	Kieran Best	Ward 4	Candidate unable to contest because of missed nomination deadline.
Greens	Hayley Stone	Ward 3	Withdrew because of personal reasons.

== Results ==
=== Ward results ===
2024 Blue Mountains City Council election: Ward results
Party	Votes	%	Swing	Seats	Change
Labor	29,052	63.9	+14.7	9	▲3
Greens	11,000	24.2	+9.3	2	Steady
Independents	4,329	9.5	−2.3	1	Steady
Libertarian	1,082	2.4	+2.4	0	Steady
Formal votes	45,463	90.0	−6.5		
Informal votes	5,049	10.0	+6.5		
Total	50,512	100.0			
Registered voters / turnout	60,045	84.1			

=== Ward 1 ===
2024 Blue Mountains City Council election: Ward 1
Party	Candidate	Votes	%	±%
Labor	1. Suzie van Opdorp (elected 2); 2. Suzanne Jamieson (elected 3); 3. David Forbes	6,629	61.7	+15.3
Greens	1. Sarah Redshaw (elected 1); 2. Melanie-Ann Turner; 3. Kathleen Herbert	4,119	38.3	+9.7
Total formal votes		10,748	88.3	−7.5
Informal votes		1,418	11.7	+7.5
Turnout		12,166	80.5	−2.1

=== Ward 2 ===
2024 Blue Mountains City Council election: Ward 2
Party	Candidate	Votes	%	±%
Labor	1. Romola Hollywood (elected 1); 2. Claire West (elected 2); 3. Paul Gannon	8,315	68.0	+20.4
Greens	1. Brent Hoare (elected 3); 2. Jenna Condie; 3. Sandra Warn	2,828	23.1	+6.1
Libertarian	Joaquim De Lima	1,082	8.9	+8.9
Total formal votes		12,225	90.4	−5.9
Informal votes		1,299	9.6	+5.9
Turnout		13,524	86.9	−1.5

=== Ward 3 ===
2024 Blue Mountains City Council election: Ward 3
Party	Candidate	Votes	%	±%
Labor	1. Darren Rodrigo (elected 2); 2. Mick Fell (elected 3); 3. Ramona Kennedy	4,329	46.3	+15.5
Independent	1. Daniel Myles (elected 1); 2. Shawn Hull; 3. Jakalin Hull	4,329	34.9	+19.2
Greens	1. Sarah O'Carrigan; 2. Angelika Treichler; 3. Michael Ord	2,335	18.8	+3.7
Total formal votes		12,409	92.8	−3.9
Informal votes		969	7.2	+3.9
Turnout		13,378	89.8	+1.4

=== Ward 4 ===
2024 Blue Mountains City Council election: Ward 4
Party	Candidate	Votes	%	±%
Labor	1. Mark Greenhill (elected 1); 2. Nyree Fisher (elected 2); 3. Margaret Buckham (elected 3)	9,779	85.1	+20.6
Greens	1. William Gruner; 2. Jennifer Brown; 3. Noel Willis	1,718	14.9	+14.9
Total formal votes		11,497	89.4	−7.6
Informal votes		1,363	10.6	+7.6
Turnout		12,860	88.9	−0.3
