= Mount St Marys College and Convent =

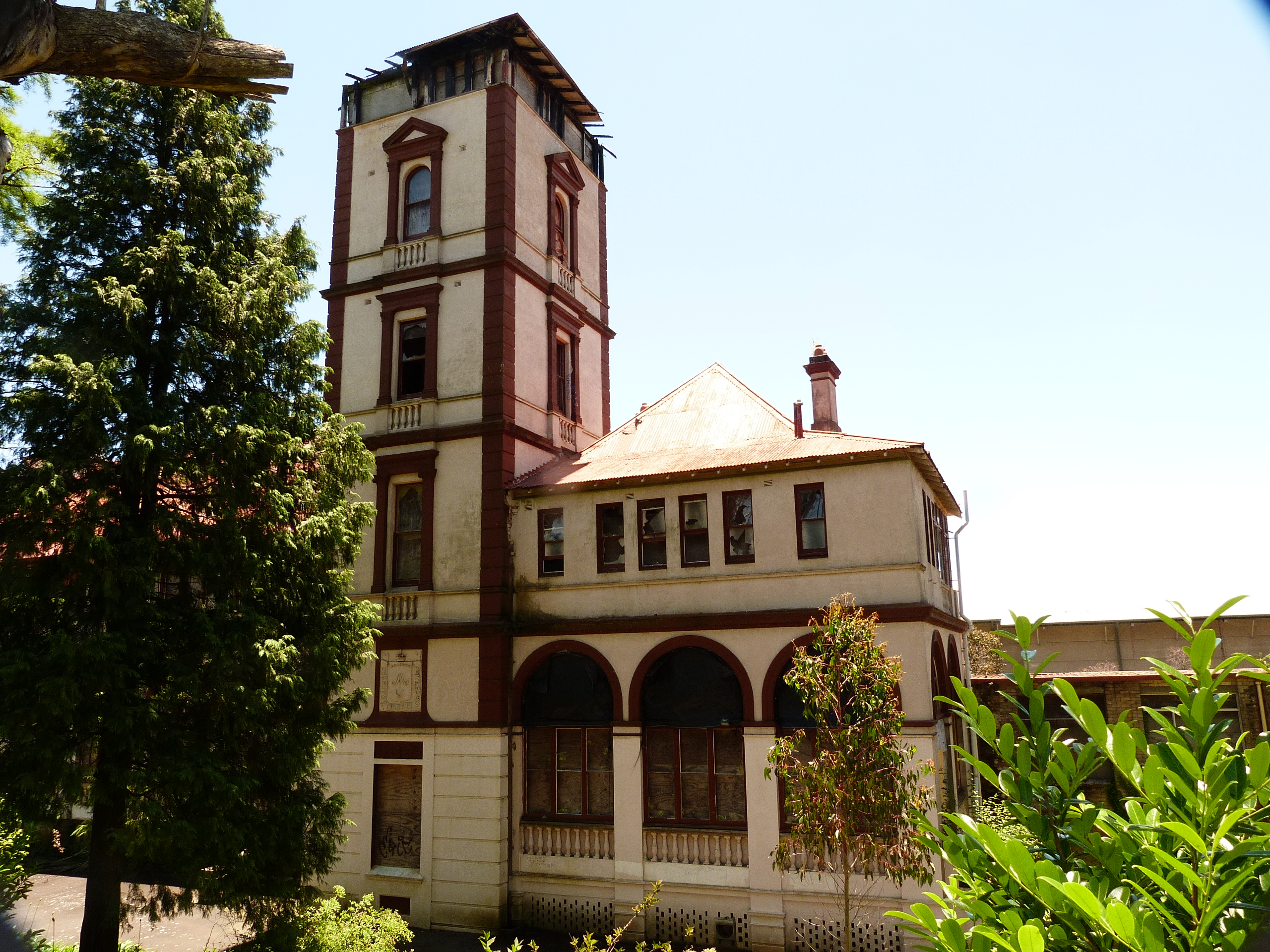
- Mount St Marys Convent, 2010

- Location within New South Wales Location within Australia
- 33°42′36″S 150°18′51″E
- Location: 10–14 Civic Place, Katoomba, City of Blue Mountains, New South Wales, Australia

History
- Built: 1909–1946

Site notes
- Architect(s): Nangle and Nurzey subsequently known as Henry E Budden & Nangle.
- Architectural style: Federation Free Classical
- Owner: Crestown Pty Ltd

New South Wales Heritage Register
- Official name: Mount St Marys College and Convent; Renaissance Centre; The (1985–1992)
- Type: State heritage (built)
- Designated: 21 November 2003
- Reference no.: 1681
- Type: Other – Education
- Category: Education
- Builders: Michael Byrne

Mount St Marys College and Convent is a heritage-listed former community arts centre, school and convent at 10–14 Civic Place, Katoomba, in the City of Blue Mountains local government area of New South Wales, Australia. It was designed by Nangle and Nurzey subsequently known as Henry E Budden & Nangle. and built from 1909 to 1946 by Michael Byrne. It is also known as The Renaissance Centre between 1985 and 1992. The property is privately owned and occupied. It was added to the New South Wales State Heritage Register on 21 November 2003.

== History ==
The Sisters of Charity were the first Order of Nuns to be established in Australia with their convent being founded at Parramatta in 1838. In the late 1890s the Sisters of Charity were seeking to found an order in the Blue Mountains to provide a place of respite for exhausted nuns "where they might find fresh vigour for God's work". It was also noted that there was no Catholic school in or near Katoomba, hence there was an opportunity for the nuns to regain their health and energy while conducting their appointed work. The Sisters rented a small cottage close to the Catholic Church and Presbytery in Katoomba and moved in in 1900. A new college called Mount St Mary's opened on the main Street of Katoomba in 1901, and in 1903 Mother Mary Eulalia was appointed Rectress of the college. The Mount St Mary's premises in town eventually proved inadequate for the rapidly increasing student base, so, in 1907, it was decided to purchase substantial acreage to the north of the railway station on which to build a brand new boarding house for girls and convent accommodation for the Sisters. Bridget McGuigan, Julia O'Connor and Helena Bourke of the Congregation of the Sisters of Charity (but denominated on the title deeds as spinsters) purchased the subject site (Lots 26–35) from Frank Grimley (The Grimley Subdivision) on 10 June 1907. The site included the cottage known as "The Rocks" (designed by Varney Parkes for John Fletcher M.A.) which was located in the south west corner of the site. The cottage and the lands the Sisters were to purchase are associated with Fletcher who had established a boarding college for boys in the mid 1880s called Katoomba College (later known as the Priory and then The Royal Palace) which was located on the opposite side of the road to where St Mary's now stands. Fletcher had purchased additional lands (future St Mary's lands) presumably to provide land for sporting activities, however, the depression of the 1890s led to the closure of his college and the sale of Lots 26–35 to Frank Grimley. When the Sisters made their purchase the land had largely been cleared and was characterised by open paddock with the exception of a number of mature eucalypts and "The Rocks". The following year on 24 June 1908, an additional 1.2 hectares (3.0 acres) were purchased from Frank Grimley adding orchards and vegetable gardens to an already spacious landscape.

The land on which St Mary's College and Convent were to stand was first described in 1814 by George William Evans, Surveyor. The land purchased by the Sisters is associated with John Fletcher M.A. The foundation stone for the college and convent was laid by Cardinal Moran on 12 April 1909. At the foundation ceremony Cardinal Moran proposed that the college would be a monument to the district and further noted that "It would be difficult to find, in the many beautiful spots which Australia presents, anything which nature has lavished such an abundance of beautiful sights as the surroundings of Katoomba". The local community were encouraged to take a personal interest in the college which "not only will be an ornament to the town, but a living monument to that higher and better education without which no community could be considered progressive."

The building of Mount St Mary's Ladies' College, Katoomba, was completed with remarkable speed with boarding pupils being accepted by February, 1910. The original building was three floor levels, constructed of rendered brick with painted corrugated iron roof sheeting, and featuring decorative stucco, a tower housing the main staircase, and recessed colonnaded balconies at the first and second floor levels. Also included were small wings on both the eastern and western sides, as well as a Chapel on the western side. The building was designed by the architectural firm Nangle and Nurzey. The Architect James Nangle was responsible for the design of a number of projects for the Catholic Church, including the Sacred Heart Church, Darlinghurst, St Columba's Seminary, Springwood, and St Mary's Cathedral Girls School.

With the establishment of the college the grounds were gradually developed to form a landscape complementary to the style and character of the building. This included low stone garden walls forming a series of informal grassed and cultivated terraces where ornamental trees and shrubs were placed. Linking these terraces were a series of paths and steps. Urns, a fountain, grotto and gazebo (thought to have come from the demolished "Royal Palace" across the road) were added. By the 1940s the landscape around the college was well established with a mixture of exotic and native species. The exotic plantings to the south and the open pasture like qualities to the north were designed to ensure that the building dominated the site and its surrounds.

The original prospectus for the college highlighted the Sisters' progressive educational philosophy, curriculum, the therapeutic benefits of the location and the grandeur of the college. The college included an infant school and kindergarten, a middle school and the college which provided University classes to prepare students for entry to Arts, Science, Medicine, and Law or Teaching Training.

The college prospered as an educational establishment through all the economic, political and social permutations of two World Wars. In 1923 the college sold a series of subdivided blocks including its tennis courts, which were purchased by Katoomba Council. Also sold at this time was the cottage "The Rocks" which had been relocated to the north east corner of the property. In 1926 Mount St Mary's celebrated its silver jubilee and in commemoration a grotto was built in the front garden of the convent, housing a Carrara marble statue of Our Lady of Lourdes.

The eight-foot cross on the roof of the tower was illuminated in 1938, and was widely visible.

When Australia and the Allies declared war on Japan on 9 December 1941, there were fears for those living and working in close proximity to Sydney Harbour. St Vincent's Convent, which was near warships in the harbour, transferred the novices, postulants and the boarders temporarily to Katoomba. In 1957, when devastating bushfires gutted much of the township of Leura, the college temporarily housed some of the Sisters and juniors from the Little Company of Mary, Leura, and other members of the Mountains community left homeless by the fires.

Apart from the perceived dangers of city living, the War years drew parents' attention to the safety of the Mountains and led to an increase in enrolments at the college. Works commenced in 1946 on a four-storey extension to the original building to accommodate the increased demand.

In 1965 Mount St Mary's became a regional girls' school catering for forms 1–4 and, with the closing of St Bernard's College, Katoomba, St Mary's became "co-educational". By 1973 the operation of the school appeared to be non viable and the Sisters withdrew from the education ministry at Mount St Mary's. The Archdiocese of Sydney took over at the end of 1973, but, as a result of declining enrolments (180 students) the school was finally closed down in 1974. The Sisters of Charity entered into an agreement with the Archdiocese whereby the premises would be used as centre for religious teaching and training purposes. In January 1978 the Congregation of the Sisters of Charity in Australia offered the property to the Archdiocese of Sydney as a gift, ending their ownership of the Mount St Mary's property. The Archdiocese continued to use the premises as an educational and religious retreat centre until 1984, when a fire order was placed on the building by the Board of Fire Commissioners, and the building was closed down. As the cost of bringing the building up to standard was considered prohibitive, the Church sold the college and land for $425,000.

In 1985 the property was purchased by John Patterson, Pamela Ruth Patterson and Liborio Donivito with the intention of transforming Mount St Mary's into a tourist attracting "Creativity Centre" housing, 30 craft areas, shops studios, galleries, performance and teaching areas. Work began in late 1985 to restore the site.

The Renaissance Centre was opened by the Premier of New South Wales, Barrie Unsworth, on 29 March 1987. The property was sold to Crestown Pty Ltd in December, 1992. Since then tenants began to vacate the Renaissance Centre, which became privately owned and occupied.

== Description ==
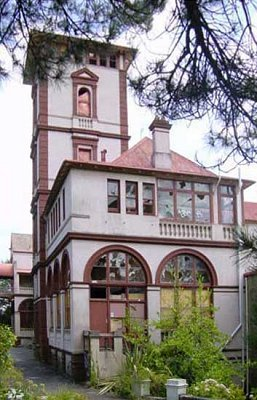
South tower and wing from the South

The property is located at 10 - 14 Civic Place Katoomba. The site is located at the northern side of the railway line, north-east of the Blue Mountains City Council complex and north-west of the Court House. The 1.652-hectare (4.08-acre) site is trapezoid in shape, with the former school and convent built into the western slope, facing north. The southern facade of the former school comprises the official entrance, and addresses a formal garden and courtyard with vehicular access. The building is built in the Federation Free Classical style. Its original form and composition is still evident and is a distinguished landmark in Katoomba, despite a modern extension.

=== Condition ===
As at 20 March 2003, 1910 Convent and College Building – Exterior / Interior: The building has been very badly vandalised both internally and externally.

- 1946 Convent extension – Exterior: Generally the 1946 extension appears in fair condition, although heavily vandalised.
- 1946 Convent extension – Interior: Internally the 1946 extension is in fair condition, although again heavily vandalised.
- 1960s Science Block: Generally the building is in fair condition, although vandalised.
- 1950s Primary School Bungalow: Externally the building appears in fair condition.

Landscape: The majority of the landscape features established during the college years are in the main existent, despite being in poor condition. The landscape to the site as at November, 2002, is in the main particularly to the southern entry area, overgrown. The landscape layers of both pre and post College occupation are evident on site.

Essentially the building retains a high degree of integrity in its external form, scale and character despite later alterations and additions, and vandalism over the recent years.

The external materials of rendered brick walls. Decorative stucco elements, painted corrugated iron roof sheeting or terracotta tiles, and timber windows essentially remains. The building retains its pattern and profile of balconies, although those on the northern side have either been infilled or obscured by the later restaurant addition. Similarly the tower remains as a dominant feature of the building, retaining its distinct and decorative elements. Windows at basement level along the southern façade have been infilled with brick forming vents.

Internally the building has undergone some alteration, primarily during its incarnation as the Renaissance Centre. Many of the original features remain, however, including the moulded plaster and timber boarded ceilings to the original 1910 building, the chapel, profiled joinery and timber floors. There remains a number of fireplaces located throughout the building, which are in various states of integrity. The bathrooms located within the former convent at first and second floor levels also appear to date from their 1946 construction.

The arched openings to the original northern and southern side walls at ground and first floor levels replaced the original pattern and profile of the 1910 windows and doors. There remains evidence of the original dividers, although the folding partitions have been removed, save for the ceiling beams which mark the locations.

In 2003 a series of fires caused damage to some elements of the site, including the central tower.

=== Modifications and dates ===
- 1909–1910: Construction and opening of the college.
- 1920s: Construction of the porte cochere in front of the main entrance to the building on the southern side, including alterations to the original balustrade of the entrance stair (this structure was demolished in the 1980s).
- 1923: Relocation of the cottage The Rocks to the north east corner of the property.
- 1926: A grotto was built in the front garden of the convent to commemorate the Silver Jubilee of Mount St Mary's College.
- 1920s–1930s: Infilling of the balconies at the ground and first floor level along the northern side of the 1910 building.
- 1946: The original building complex was extended to include a four-storey extension, constructed on a north–south axis, at right angles to the original school building, and projecting to form an informal north east facing courtyard.
- 1960s: A science wing was subsequently erected adjoining the east wing of the original 1910 building, and continuing in the same east–west plane. Alterations to provide internal access at the ground and first floor level.
- 1980s: Alterations for Renaissance Centre including:
- Construction of a Kiosk and walkway from Civic Place;
- Alterations to the partitions at basement floor 1910 building;
- Alterations to the internal partitions, southern end of the 1946 extension.
- New arched openings to the northern and southern side walls of the ground floor classroom, first floor dormitory and adjacent to the chapel.
- Construction of the glazed restaurant addition at basement level on the northern side of the 1910 building.

== Heritage listing ==
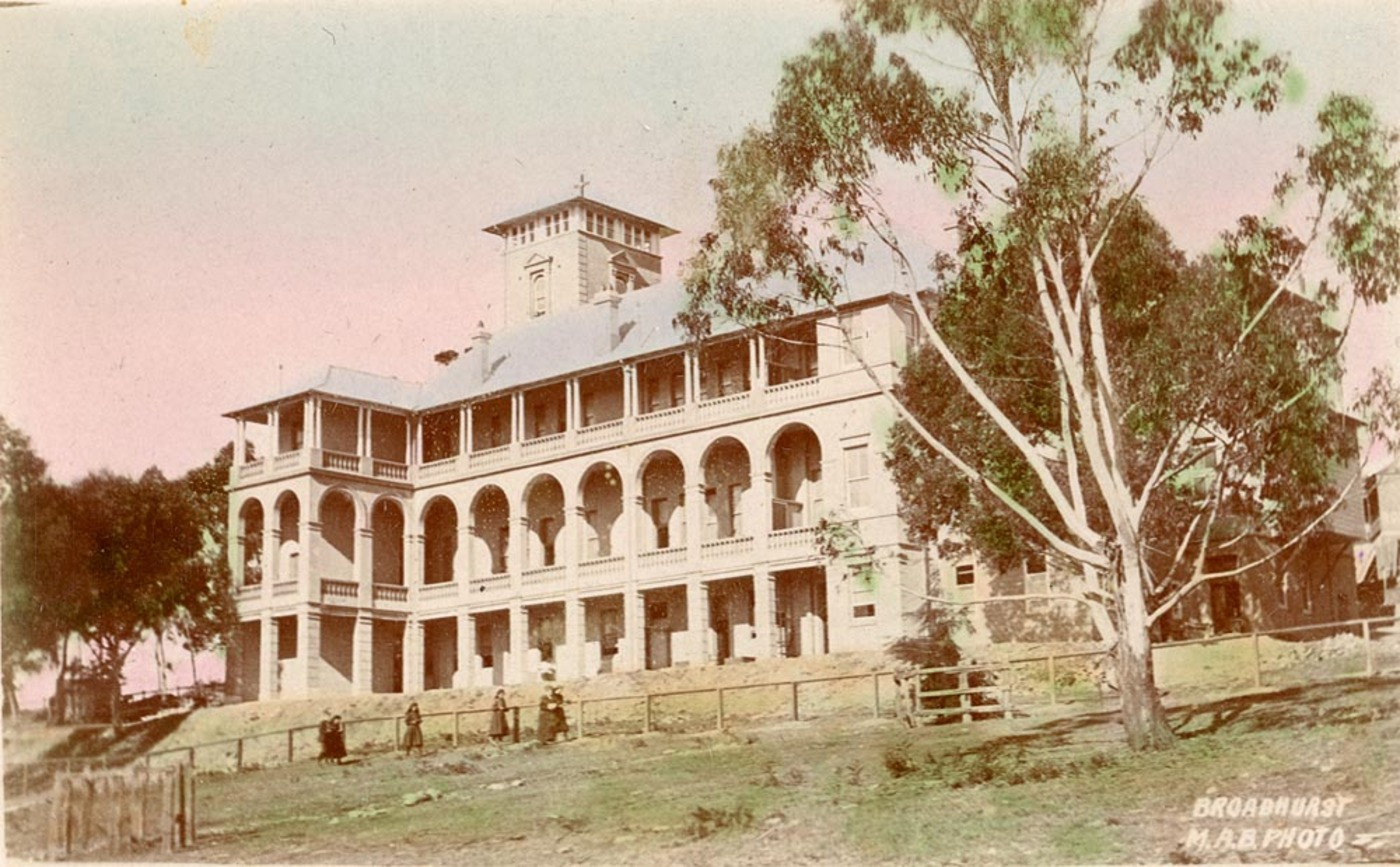
Mount St Marys Ladies College, early 1900s

As at 25 March 2003, Statement of Significance The place known as Mount St Mary's College and Convent and subsequently the Renaissance Centre is of State significance because of its connection over an extended period of time with the Congregation of the Sisters of Charity in Australia, the oldest such order in Australia, and with its unbroken association with education from 1909–1991. The physical location, expansive modified landscape setting, and imposing complex of ecclesiastical buildings dominated by a tower, lends Mount St Mary's great aesthetic significance in the cultural landscapes of the Blue Mountains. It remains a visually significant landmark at the eastern gateway to Katoomba and has great social significance for the former religious community, students, and wider Blue Mountains communities. The complex of buildings elegantly demonstrate the Federation Free Classical style ecclesiastical architectural language. In addition, the extensive hard and soft landscape design elements define a number of official, religious, utilitarian and recreational zones associated Catholic institutions. The scale and setting of Mount St Mary's reflects a significant period in the growth and development of Catholic educational institutions in NSW and their subsequent decline as a regional presence across the State.

Mount St Marys College and Convent was listed on the New South Wales State Heritage Register on 21 November 2003, having satisfied the following criteria:

The place is important in demonstrating the course, or pattern, of cultural or natural history in New South Wales.

Mount St Mary's College and Convent is associated with the significant historic stage in the development of the Blue Mountains as a place for education, accommodation, recreational activities, cultural extension, and pastoral care in the form of religion, all in a natural environment conducive to good health. Mount St Mary's shows evidence of the establishment (1909), growth (1946) and later decline (1964–1974) of a Catholic secondary school which for the majority of its existence was dedicated to the progressive education of young women.

The place has a strong or special association with a person, or group of persons, of importance of cultural or natural history of New South Wales's history.

Mount St Mary's College and Convent is of State significance for its association with the Congregation of the Sisters of Charity in Australia, and their progressive role in the education of young women in NSW during the 20th Century. Mount St Mary's is also associated with Mother Mary Michael McGuigan, Mother Superior of the Congregation in Sydney, Mother Mary Eulalia the first Rectress of the new college and Cardinal Patrick Moran who laid the foundation stone. Moran's episcopacy notably heralded a significant expansion of catholic educational services. The purpose built Mount St Mary's College and Convent is also associated with the ecclesiastical architectural works of the firm Budden and Nangle. The site on which St Mary's was established and developed is directly associated with the European founders of Katoomba - John Britty North, James Henry Neale, and Frank Grimley who contributed significantly to the development of Katoomba in the mid to late 19th century.

The place is important in demonstrating aesthetic characteristics and/or a high degree of creative or technical achievement in New South Wales.

Mount St Mary's College and Convent is aesthetically distinctive as a visually prominent purpose built Catholic college and convent designed in the Federation Free Classical Style, set in an expansive and largely modified landscape designed to complement and enhance the visual prominence of the architecture. Due to its scale, prominent tower and siting on high ground it forms a significant landmark and civic presence at the eastern entrance to Katoomba. The view lines both into and out from the site are of high aesthetic significance.

The Federation Free Classical style in uncommon in eastern Australia, and Mount St Mary's is a notable example of its use in country New South Wales.

The unusually rapid construction program that enabled enrolments to be taken from February 1910 was a technical achievement given the magnitude of the development.

The place has a strong or special association with a particular community or cultural group in New South Wales for social, cultural or spiritual reasons.

Mount St Mary's College and Convent has an important association with the Congregation of the Sisters of Charity in Australia and the broader Roman Catholic Church. Mount St Mary's has a strong association with the general community and other educational communities of the Blue Mountains through engagement via academic, sporting, cultural and economic activities, and the pastoral care of the Sisters of Charity. Mount St Mary's has an important association for female students from around the State who were entrusted to the care of the Sisters of Charity, evacuees from St Vincent's College Sydney during World War II, and members of the Blue Mountains community who were given shelter at the college following the catastrophic bushfires of 1957.

Mount St Mary's also has significance to the broader Christian community of the Blue Mountains as attested to by the illumination of the cross on top of the tower, which was suggested by and paid for by the general community in 1938.

As a significant religious and educational institution and prominent landmark, Blue Mountains residents have a strong sense of community ownership of the site by virtue of their engagement with the site over many years and its aesthetic appeal and dramatic visual prominence.

As the Renaissance Centre, its association with artists, performers and the hospitality industry ensured its continuing importance to the social and cultural life of the Katoomba and wider Blue Mountains communities. In its phases of non-use, the vacated site has evoked strong community responses, reflecting a sense of ownership and concern, and a drive for the restoration of the landmark buildings and site. The Mount St Mary's College and Convent, in its phase as The Renaissance Centre, has had local representative social significance for the community of the Blue Mountains, and for its continued use for commercial purposes. It has local social significance for its contribution to the character and identity of the streetscape of the immediate vicinity, and as a focal point for the wider Blue Mountains communities, and regional and international tourists and students.

The place has potential to yield information that will contribute to an understanding of the cultural or natural history of New South Wales.

Research into the history of the Mount St Mary's site reveals its earlier association with education through its use, by pupils from John Walter Fletcher's Boys' College, as a sporting area. The site is also the last remaining significant parcel of land remaining from James Henry Neale's grant by purchase in 1876, which contributes to an understanding of the pattern of subdivisions in and around Katoomba. The site is also significant through its associative importance for the Katoomba and broader Blue Mountains communities, as a significant topographical feature and aesthetically appealing landmark

The expansive landscape of St Marys College and Convent is significant both as a designed landscape and as an archaeological landscape. The largely intact curtilage provides significant evidence of the designed official, religious contemplative and recreational zones associated with Roman Catholic institutions, once an integral part of such institutions. The site has the potential to yield further information about significant garden and design elements such as the elegant gazebo which is thought to have come from the demolished "Royal Palace Katoomba" formerly the Katoomba College for Boys which was built and operated by John Fletcher MA.

The place possesses uncommon, rare or endangered aspects of the cultural or natural history of New South Wales.

Mount St Mary's College and Convent has rare significance as a purpose built boarding college for young women, with a progressive academic educational focus set within a framework of Roman Catholic spiritual ideology. The Mount St Mary's site represents one of the last large parcels of land to survive the subdivision patterns resulting naturally from the urban development and expansion of Katoomba. Mount St Marty's is the only surviving example of such a college for girls and convent complex in the Blue Mountains.

The place is important in demonstrating the principal characteristics of a class of cultural or natural places/environments in New South Wales.

Mount St Mary's site is representative of, and attests to the importance of education to the local areas' economic growth, both as a Roman Catholic College, and subsequently, as The Renaissance Centre cultural centre for artists, including the Ann Barker College for English. The subject building and landscape have representative significance for their contribution to the development of structures designed for the purposes of offering regional private education.

== See also ==
- Australian non-residential architectural styles
