= City of Blue Mountains =

- Local government area
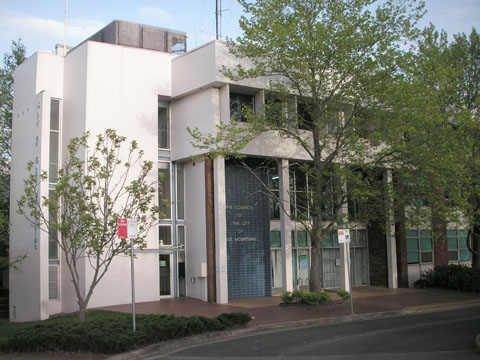
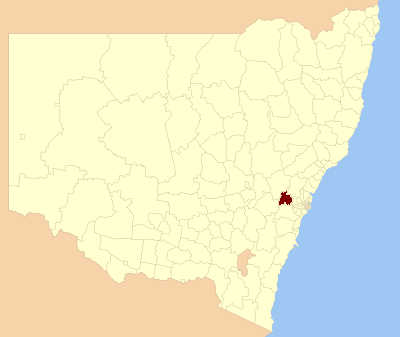
- City of Blue Mountains council building in Katoomba Location in Outer Metropolitan Sydney

- Interactive map of City of Blue Mountains
- Coordinates: 33°42′S 150°18′E
- Country: Australia
- State: New South Wales
- Region: Blue Mountains, Greater Western Sydney
- Established: 1 October 1947
- Council seat: Katoomba

Government
  - Mayor: Mark Greenhill
  - State electorate: Blue Mountains; Penrith
  - Federal division: Macquarie

Area
  - Total: 1,430 km^{2} (550 sq mi)

Population
  - Total: 78,121 (LGA 2021)
- Website: City of Blue Mountains
LGAs around City of Blue Mountains
Lithgow	Hawkesbury	Hawkesbury
Lithgow	City of Blue Mountains	Penrith
Oberon	Wollondilly	Liverpool

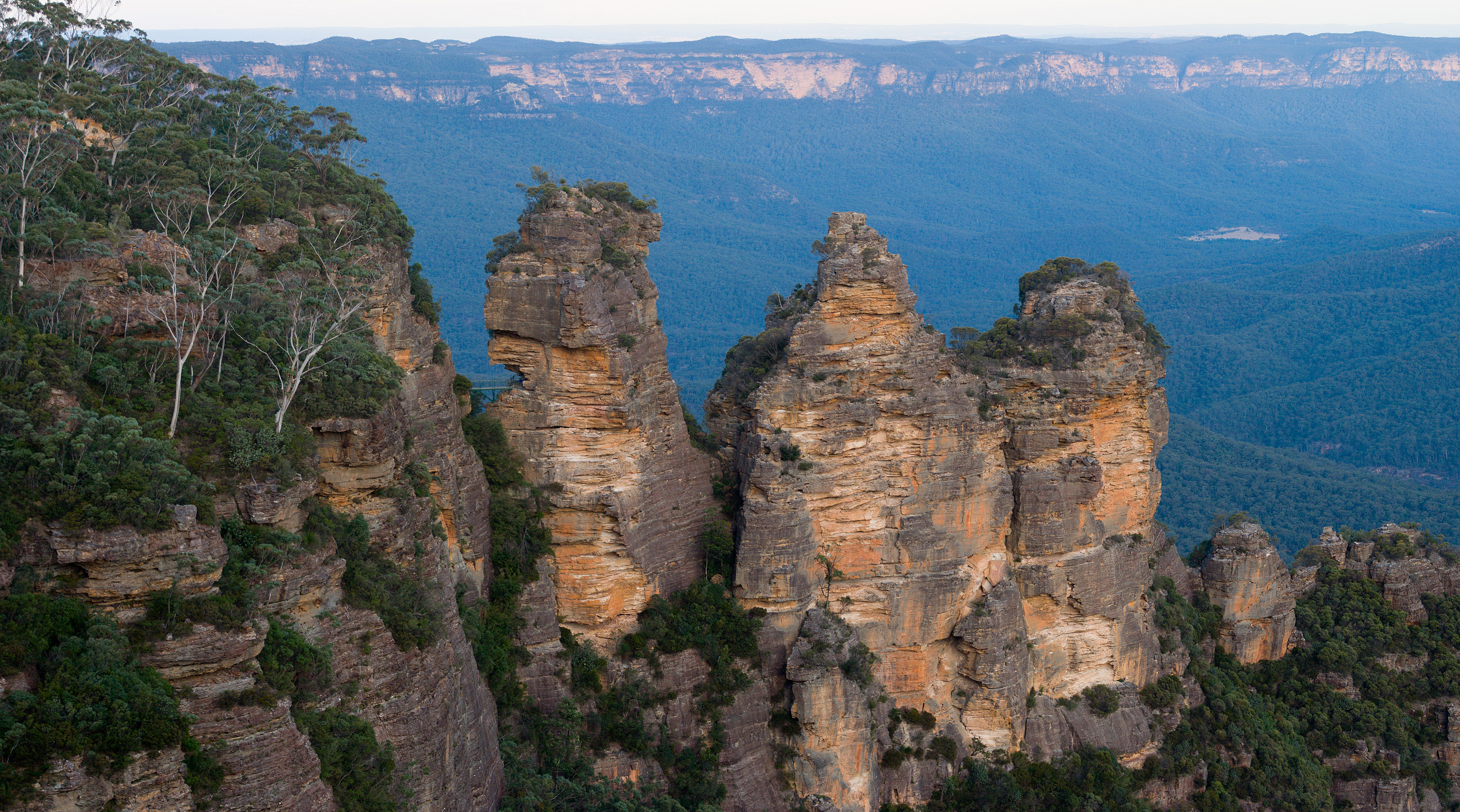
The Three Sisters, south of Katoomba, in Blue Mountains National Park, are a major attraction of the city.

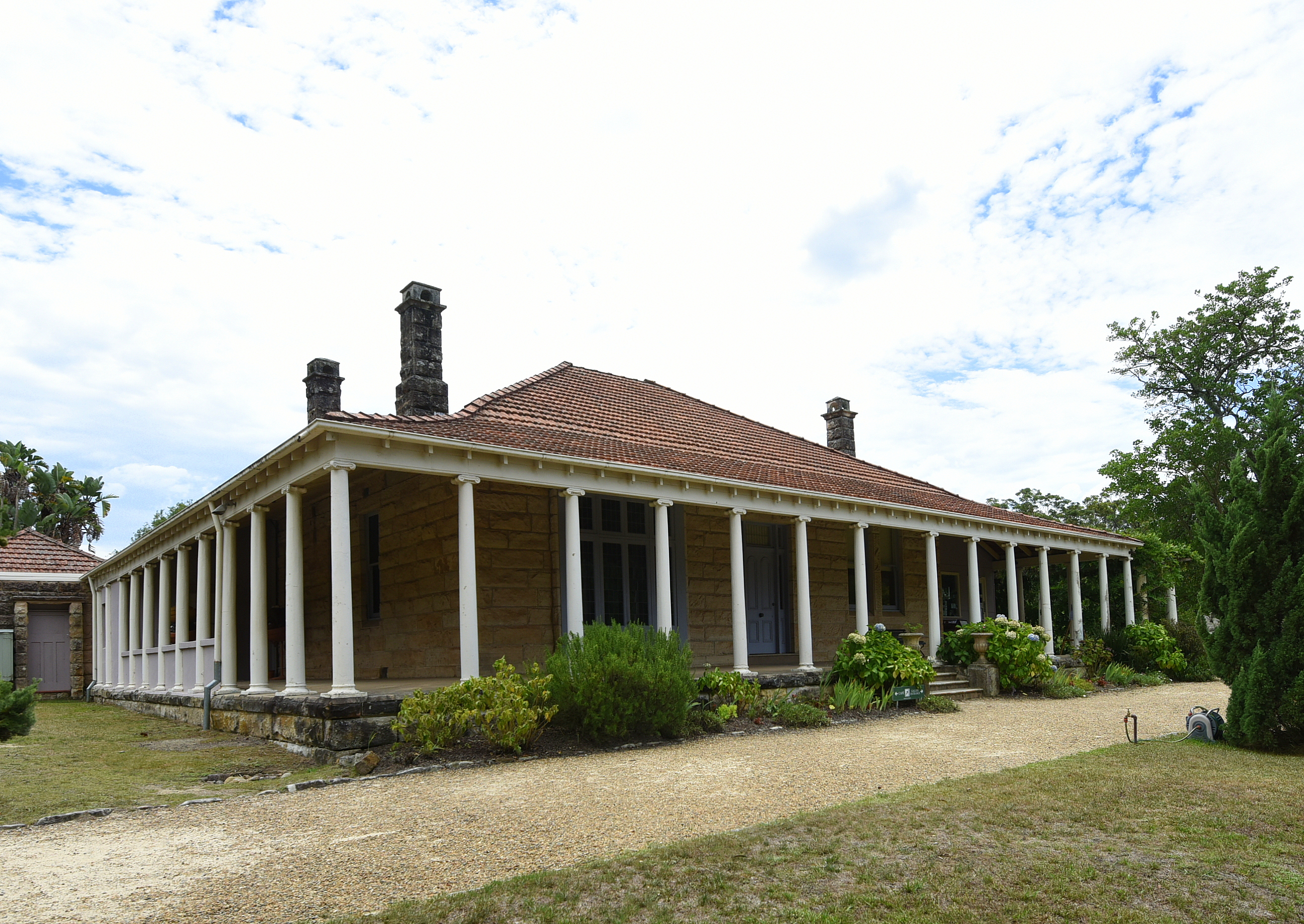
The Norman Lindsay Gallery and Museum is a tourist destination in the town of Faulconbridge.

The City of Blue Mountains is a local government area of New South Wales, Australia, governed by the Blue Mountains City Council. The city is located in the Blue Mountains, on the Great Dividing Range at the far western fringe of the Greater Sydney area. Major settlements include Katoomba, Lawson, Springwood, and Blaxland.

The mayor of Blue Mountains City Council is Councillor Mark Greenhill, a member of the Labor Party.

== Towns and villages in the local government area ==
The urban part of the city consists of a ribbon of close or contiguous towns which lie on the Main Western railway line, served by NSW TrainLink's Blue Mountains Line, and Great Western Highway between Emu Plains and Lithgow. About 70% of the city's area is within the Blue Mountains National Park which lies north and south of the ribbon of towns. The National Park is part of the much larger Greater Blue Mountains Area World Heritage Site and the city brands itself as "The City Within a World Heritage National Park". The towns and villages are generally grouped into lower, mid, and upper mountains. The economy of the upper mountains is dependent almost entirely on tourism. The road to Sydney, the Great Western Highway, is mostly dual carriageway but is relatively slow due to the urban development and hilly terrain. The electric train service integrates into Sydney Trains, Sydney's suburban rail network.

The main towns and villages in the City of Blue Mountains are:

- Bell
- Blackheath
- Blaxland
- Bullaburra
- Faulconbridge
- Glenbrook
- Hawkesbury Heights
- Hazelbrook
- Katoomba
- Lapstone
- Lawson
- Leura
- Linden
- Medlow Bath
- Mount Irvine
- Mount Riverview
- Mount Victoria
- Mount Wilson
- Springwood
- Sun Valley
- Valley Heights
- Warrimoo
- Wentworth Falls
- Winmalee
- Woodford
- Yellow Rock

== Demographics ==
Selected historical census data for the City of Blue Mountains local government area
Census year		2001	2006	2011	2016	2021
Population	Estimated residents on census night	73,675	▲74,067	▲75,942	▲76,904	▲78,121
Population	LGA rank in terms of size within New South Wales		28	▲27	▼31	
Population	% of New South Wales population		1.1%	1.09%	▼0.99%	▼0.94%
Population	% of Australian population	0.39%	▼0.37%	▼0.35%	▼0.33%	▼0.30%
Cultural and language diversity						
Ancestry, top responses	English	n/r	n/r	30.1%	▲30.5%	▲44.3%
Ancestry, top responses	Australian	n/r	n/r	28.7%	▼26.3%	▲38.1%
Ancestry, top responses	Irish	n/r	n/r	10.2%	▲11.1%	▲16.0%
Ancestry, top responses	Scottish	n/r	n/r	8.3%	▲8.6%	▲13.3%
Ancestry, top responses	German	n/r	n/r	3.2%	▼3.3%	▲4.8%
Language, top responses (other than English)	German	n/r	0.6%	0.6%	▼0.5%	0.5%
Language, top responses (other than English)	Spanish	n/r	0.3%	▲0.4%	▲0.5%	▲0.6%
Language, top responses (other than English)	Italian	0.3%	▲0.4%	▼0.3%	▲0.4%	▼0.3%
Language, top responses (other than English)	Mandarin	n/r	n/r	n/r	0.4%	▼0.3%
Language, top responses (other than English)	French	n/r	n/r	n/r	0.3%	0.3%
Religious affiliation						
Religious affiliation, top responses	No religion (excluding not stated)	18.0%	▲22.0%	▲26.8%	▲35.7%	▲46.5%
Religious affiliation, top responses	Catholic	22.6%	▼22.5%	▼21.5%	▼19.7%	▼17.2%
Religious affiliation, top responses	Anglican	24.6%	▼22.5%	▼20.9%	▼17.0%	▼13.5%
Religious affiliation, top responses	Not stated	n/r	n/r	n/r	8.4%	▼4.9%
Religious affiliation, top responses	Christian (nfd)	n/r	n/r	n/r	2.9%	2.9%
Median weekly incomes						
Personal income	Median weekly personal income	n/r	$501	▲$590	▲$688	▲$817
Personal income	% of Australian median income	n/r	107.5%	102.2%	103.9%	101.4%
Family income	Median weekly family income	n/r	$1,345	▲$1,624	▲$1,866	▲$2,235
Family income	% of Australian median income	n/r	114.9%	109.6%	107.6%	105.4%
Household income	Median weekly household income	n/r	$1,093	$1,270	$1,468	$1,756
Household income	% of Australian median income	n/r	106.4%	102.9%	102.1%	100.5%

== Council ==
=== Current composition and election method ===
A map of the four wards, showing party representation as of the 2021 local elections

Blue Mountains City Council is composed of twelve councillors elected proportionally as four separate wards, each electing three councillors. All councillors are elected for a fixed four-year term of office. The mayor is elected by the councillors at the first meeting of the council. The most recent general election was held on 14 September 2024.

Party	Councillors
Labor Party	9
The Greens	2
Independents	1
Total	12

Ward	Councillor	Party	Notes
First Ward	Sarah Redshaw	Greens	Elected 2021.
First Ward	Suzie van Opdorp	Labor	Elected 2021.
First Ward	Suzanne Jamieson	Labor	Elected 2024.
Second Ward	Romola Hollywood	Labor	Elected 2012. Deputy Mayor 2021–date.
Second Ward	Claire West	Labor	Elected 2021.
Second Ward	Brent Hoare	Greens	Elected 2016.
Third Ward	Daniel Myles	Independent	Elected 1999. Deputy Mayor 2004–2005. Mayor 2010–2013.
Third Ward	Darren Rodrigo	Labor	Elected 2024.
Third Ward	Mick Fell	Labor	Elected 2012.
Fourth Ward	Mark Greenhill	Labor	Elected 1999–2004, 2008–date. Deputy Mayor 2010–2012. Mayor 2013–date.
Fourth Ward	Nyree Fisher	Labor	Elected 2021.
Fourth Ward	Margaret Buckham	Labor	Elected 2024.

== Election results ==
=== 2024 ===
2024 Blue Mountains City Council election: Ward results
Party	Votes	%	Swing	Seats	Change
Labor	29,052	63.9	+14.7	9	▲3
Greens	11,000	24.2	+9.3	2	Steady
Independents	4,329	9.5	−2.3	1	Steady
Libertarian	1,082	2.4	+2.4	0	Steady
Formal votes	45,463	90.0	−6.5		
Informal votes	5,049	10.0	+6.5		
Total	50,512	100.0			
Registered voters / turnout	60,045	84.1			

=== 2021 ===
2021 New South Wales local elections: Blue Mountains
Party	Votes	%	Swing	Seats	Change
Labor	24,032	49.2	+11.4	6	▲1
Liberal	11,750	24.1	−1.1	3	▼1
Greens	7,296	14.9	−4.3	2	Steady
Independent	5,755	11.8	−5.9	1	Steady
Formal votes	48,833	96.48			
Informal votes	1,784	3.52			
Total	50,617	100.00			

== Mayors ==
#	Mayor	Party	Term start	Term end	Time in office	Notes
1	William Freelander	Independent	2 October 1947	7 December 1948	1 year, 66 days	
2	Frank Walford	Independent	7 December 1948	12 December 1950	2 years, 5 days	
3	Percy Edward Galwey	Independent	12 December 1950	5 December 1953	2 years, 358 days	
4	Aubrey Murphy	Independent	15 December 1953	December 1955	1 year, 351 days	
–	Frank Walford	Independent	December 1955	December 1956	1 year, 0 days	
–	Aubrey Murphy	Independent	December 1956	December 1959	3 years, 0 days	
5	Leslie Corne	Independent	December 1959	December 1960	352 days	
–	Frank Walford	Independent	December 1960	December 1961	1 year, 0 days	
6	Keith Bates	Independent	December 1961	December 1966	4 years, 351 days	
7	Tom Hunter	Independent	December 1966	December 1967	351 days	
8	Ern Lesslie		December 1967	December 1969	1 year, 351 days	
9	Jack Powell		December 1969	September 1971	1 year, 274 days	
10	Ian Dash		September 1971	September 1974	3 years, 0 days	
–	Ern Lesslie		September 1974	September 1976	2 years, 0 days	
11	William Lloyd		September 1976	September 1977	1 year, 0 days	
–	Ern Lesslie		September 1977	19 December 1979	2 years, 109 days	
–	John James Wickham (Administrator)		19 December 1979	December 1981	1 year, 347 days	
12	Peter Quirk		December 1981	September 1987	5 years, 274 days	
13	James C. Angel		September 1987	September 1988	1 year, 0 days	
14	Ralph Williams		September 1988	September 1991	3 years, 0 days	
15	Peter O'Toole		September 1991	February 1992	153 days	
16	Bob Clarke		February 1992	September 1994	2 years, 212 days	
17	Joy Anderson		September 1994	September 1995	1 year, 0 days	
18	Michael Neall		September 1995	September 1999	4 years, 0 days	
19	Jim Angel	Labor	September 1999	13 September 2008	9 years, 12 days	
20	Adam Searle	Labor	30 September 2008	21 September 2010	1 year, 356 days	
21	Daniel Myles	Liberal	21 September 2010	17 September 2013	2 years, 361 days	
22	Mark Greenhill	Labor	17 September 2013	Incumbent	13 years, 54 days	

== Council services ==
=== Cemeteries ===
The City of Blue Mountains Council maintains cemeteries at Blackheath, Faulconbridge, Katoomba, Lawson, Megalong Valley, Mount Irvine, Mount Victoria, Mount Wilson, Springwood, and Wentworth Falls.

=== Libraries ===
Blue Mountains Library operates three full-time branches, three part-time branches and a service for train commuters at Springwood and Katoomba stations two days a week.

=== Leisure centres ===
Blue Mountains Leisure Centres operate from five locations. All five locations have pools and the Katoomba and Springwood locations have gyms and offer various fitness classes.

== Heritage listings ==
The City of Blue Mountains has a number of heritage-listed sites, including the following sites listed on the New South Wales State Heritage Register:

- Blue Mountains National Park: Blue Mountains walking tracks
- Blackheath, Main Western railway: Blackheath railway station
- Faulconbridge, 14-20 Norman Lindsay Crescent: Norman Lindsay Gallery and Museum
- Glenbrook, Great Western Highway: Glenbrook railway residence
- Glenbrook, Great Western Highway: Glenbrook Tunnel
- Glenbrook, Mitchells Pass: Lennox Bridge, Glenbrook
- Katoomba, 10-14 Civic Place: Mount St Marys College and Convent
- Katoomba, Katoomba Street: Carrington Hotel
- Katoomba, 59-61 Katoomba Street: Katoomba Post Office
- Katoomba, 63-69 Katoomba Street: Paragon Cafe, Katoomba
- Katoomba, Main Western railway: Katoomba railway station
- Katoomba, 10-16 Panorama Drive: Lilianfels, Katoomba
- Lawson, Main Western railway: Lawson railway station
- Leura, 37 – 49 Everglades Avenue: Everglades, Leura
- Linden, 91 – 111 Glossop Road: Linden Observatory Complex
- Linden, off Railway Parade: Cox's Road and Early Deviations - Linden, Linden Precinct
- Medlow Bath, Beauchamp Road: Medlow Dam
- Medlow Bath, Great Western Highway: Medlow Bath railway station
- Mount Victoria, Main Western railway: Mount Victoria railway station
- Mount Victoria, Mount York Road (off): Cox's Road and Early Deviations - Mount York, Cox's Pass Precinct
- Mount Wilson, 68-78 The Avenue: Wynstay Estate
- Springwood, 345-347 Great Western Highway: Christ Church Anglican Church, Springwood
- Springwood, 39 Hawkesbury Road: Buckland Convalescent Home
- Springwood, Main Western railway: Springwood railway station
- Valley Heights, 110 and 112 Green Parade: Valley Heights railway gatehouse
- Valley Heights, Main Western railway: Valley Heights railway station
- Warragamba, Coxs River Arms: Coxs River track
- Wentworth Falls, 63-67 Falls Road: Davisville, Wentworth Falls
- Wentworth Falls, 1-15 Matcham Avenue: Weatherboard Inn archaelological site
- Woodford, 90-92 Great Western Highway: Woodford Academy
- Woodford, Old Bathurst Road: Cox's Road and Early Deviations - Woodford, Old Bathurst Road Precinct
- Woodford, The Appian Way (off): Cox's Road and Early Deviations - Woodford, Appian Way Precinct

== Sister cities ==
The City of Blue Mountains has sister city relationships with the following cities:

- Sanda, Hyōgo, Japan
- (United States) Flagstaff, Arizona, US

== See also ==
- List of local government areas in New South Wales
