= Hayden Smith =

US international rugby union & American football player

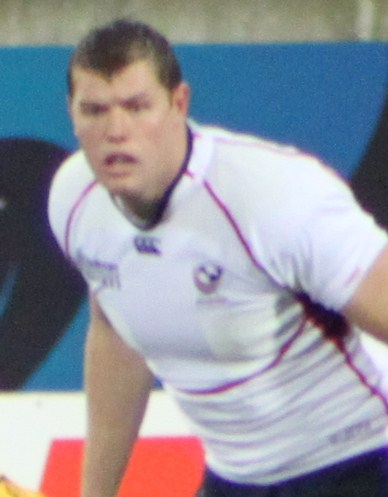
- Born: 10 April 1985 (age 41) Penrith, Australia
- Height: 1.98 m (6 ft 6 in)
- Weight: 120 kg (18 st 13 lb; 265 lb)
- School: Blue Mountains Grammar School
- University: MSU Denver

Rugby union career
- Position: Lock/Second Row
Amateur team(s)
Years	Team	Apps	(Points)
2008	Denver Barbarians		
2016	Esher RFC		
Senior career
Years	Team	Apps	(Points)
2008–12, 2014–16	Saracens	66	(5)
- Correct as of 30 December 2020
International career
Years	Team	Apps	(Points)
2008–2015	United States	29	(0)
- Correct as of 30 December 2020
- Football career

No. 82
- Position: Tight end

Personal information
- Born: 10 April 1985 (age 41); Penrith, NSW, Australia
- Listed height: 6 ft 7 in (2.01 m)
- Listed weight: 255 lb (116 kg)

Career information
- High school: Blue Mountains Grammar School (Wentworth Falls, New South Wales, Australia)
- College: Metro State

Career history
- New York Jets (2012)

Career statistics
- Receptions: 1
- Receiving yards: 16
- Stats at Pro Football Reference

Hayden Smith (born 10 April 1985) is an Australian retired professional rugby union player who played for Saracens FC and the United States national rugby union team. Smith also spent two years playing professional American football as a tight end for the New York Jets of the National Football League (NFL).

== Early life ==
Smith grew up in the town of Bullaburra in the Blue Mountains outside Sydney. He graduated from Blue Mountains Grammar School in 2002. As a teenager, he trained with the Sydney Kings NBL basketball team.

Smith won a scholarship to play and study in the United States. He went on to study finance at the New York Institute of Technology. He transferred to the Metropolitan State University of Denver, Colorado where he played power forward on the basketball team. Smith intended to return to Australia and play professionally for the Kings, but the team went bankrupt.

As Smith completed his degree at Metro State, and basketball season had ended, he began playing rugby union on weekends to stay fit.

== Rugby union (2008–2011) ==
Smith resumed playing rugby competitively in 2008. Within weeks of starting, he played for the All-American Team and following his graduation, had started to play with the Denver Barbarians. Soon after joining the Barbarians, he was named 2008 Rugby All-American.

Smith joined the professional English side Saracens FC in the 2008/09 season on an academy contract. He made his academy debut against Newcastle Falcons in the 2008/09 season. His performances for the academy team Saracens Storm quickly saw him elevated to the first-team squad. Smith impressed to earn a first-team contract for the following seasons in which he went on to play a total of 43 matches in both the English Premiership and the Heineken Cup.

In international rugby, Smith was a regular with the US national team, for which he qualified on residency grounds. He made his test debut on 8 November 2008 against Uruguay. Smith helped his country qualify for the 2011 Rugby World Cup during which he started all 4 group stage matches for the United States. After the 2011 Rugby World Cup, Smith took a hiatus from rugby.

== NFL career (2012–2013) ==
Smith was looking at the possibility of playing American football in the National Football League and had a workout with the New York Jets, Philadelphia Eagles, Dallas Cowboys, Washington Redskins and the New Orleans Saints.

The New York Jets signed Smith on 3 April 2012. He was waived on 31 August 2012. A day later, he was signed to the Jets' practice squad. On 27 October 2012, he was promoted to the active roster from the practice squad. He caught his first and only NFL pass on 23 December 2012. He was released on 26 August 2013.

== Return to rugby (2013–2016) ==
On 9 December 2013, it was announced that Hayden had re-signed for Saracens on a long-term deal. In January 2014, Smith played his first professional rugby match for Saracens since returning from the NFL. Smith started for Saracens in the 2014–15 Anglo-Welsh Cup Final helping them claim a victory at the death, 23–20 over Exeter Chiefs.

Smith resumed playing for the United States in March 2014 in the qualifying matches for the 2015 Rugby World Cup. He also played for the US in the June 2014 Pacific Nations Cup.

At the end of the 2015–16 season Smith left Saracens to join Esher of National League 1.
