= Valley Heights railway station =

Railway station in New South Wales, Australia

Valley Heights
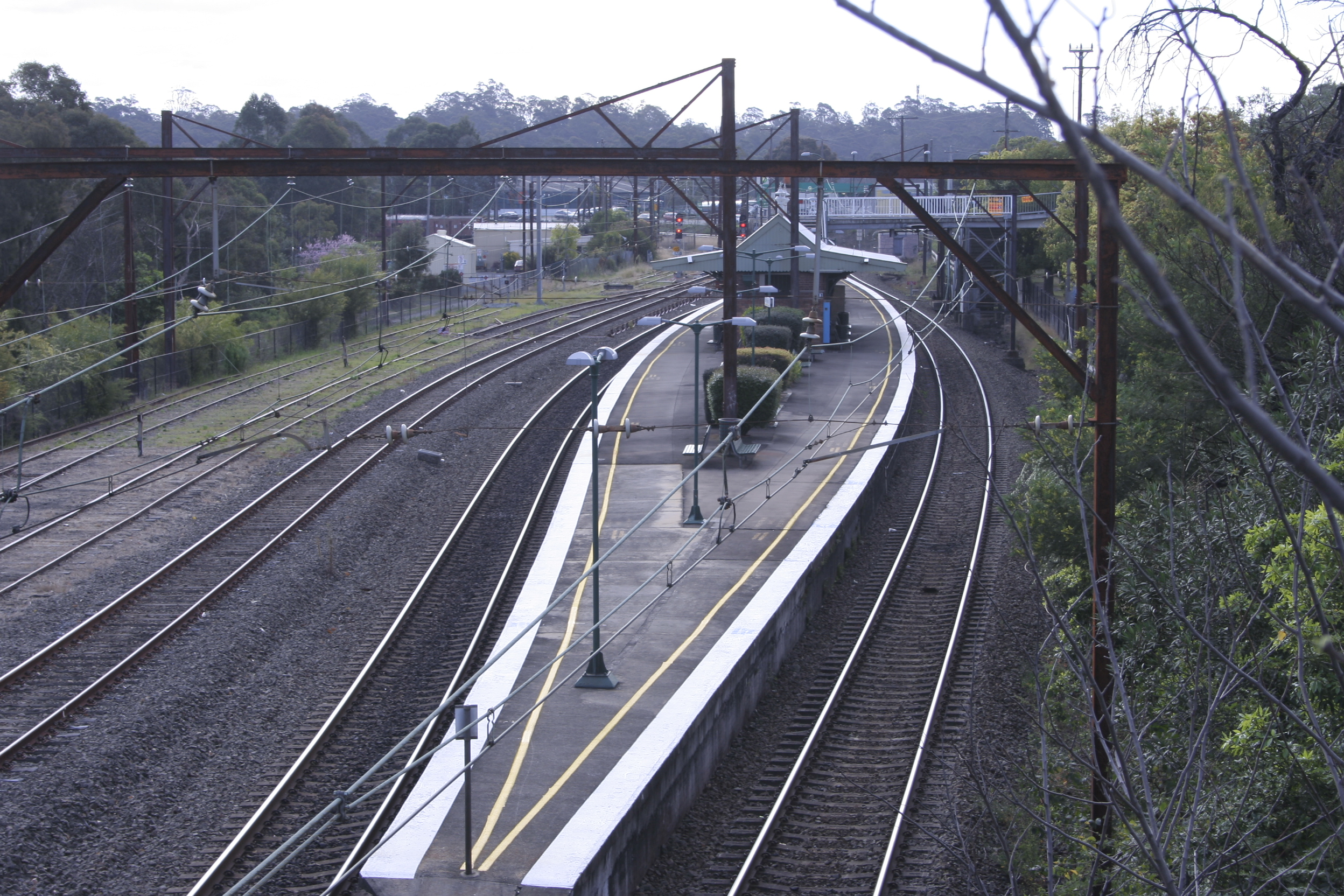
- Westbound view of station platform and building, August 2009

General information
- Location: Great Western Highway, Valley Heights; Australia
- Coordinates: 33°42′16″S 150°35′02″E
- Elevation: 324 metres (1,063 ft)
- Owner: Transport Asset Manager of New South Wales
- Operator: Sydney Trains
- Line: Main Western
- Distance: 77.41 km (48.10 mi) from Central
- Platforms: 2 (1 island)
- Tracks: 2
- Connections: Bus

Construction
- Structure type: Ground

Other information
- Status: Weekdays: Staffed: 6am to 10am: Weekends and public holidays: Unstaffed
- Station code: VHS
- Website: Transport for NSW

History
- Opened: May 1875
- Electrified: February 1957
- Former names: Eagers Platform (1875–1877); The Valley (1877–1880)

Passengers
- 2025: 27,247 (year); 75 (daily) (Sydney Trains)

Services
Preceding station	Intercity Trains	Following station
Springwood towards Lithgow	Blue Mountains Line	Warrimoo towards Central

New South Wales Heritage Register
- Official name: Valley Heights Railway Station and Locomotive Depot; The Valley
- Type: State heritage (complex / group)
- Designated: 2 April 1999
- Reference no.: 1276
- Type: Railway Platform / Station
- Category: Transport – Rail
- Builders: NSW Department of Railways
Location
- Location within New South Wales

Valley Heights railway station is a heritage-listed railway station located on the Main Western line in Valley Heights, in the City of Blue Mountains local government area of New South Wales, Australia. It was designed and built by NSW Government Railways. It is also known as Valley Heights Railway Station and Locomotive Depot and The Valley. The property was added to the New South Wales State Heritage Register on 2 April 1999.

== History ==
The Great Western Railway went through Valley Heights in 1867. The platform opened in 1875 to service the private residence, The Valley Inn, of the Colonial Treasurer, the Hon. Geoffrey Eager M.L.A. / M.L.C. The station opened in May 1875 as Eagers Platform. Public facilities and a waiting shed were erected in 1877 and the name was changed from Eagers Platform to The Valley in 1877; and again to Valley Heights on 19 August 1880.

The line was duplicated in 1902, when the present brick platform building opened. Virtually every station between Emu Plains and Lithgow received the same style of Federation structure when the Western line was duplicated between 1898 and 1912.

Valley Heights formerly had a yard and locomotive servicing facilities. Until January 1989 it provided locomotives to assist trains up the heavily graded section of the line to Katoomba. The western line was electrified to Valley Heights on 23 October 1956. From 2 February 1957 steam operations from Valley Heights were replaced by the 46 class electric locomotives which assisted trains from Valley Heights to Katoomba. From that train all steam hauled trains, both freight and passenger were electrically assisted to Katoomba, until complete electrification saw steam removed from the scene. The former depot still exists and is now maintained as the Valley Heights Locomotive Depot Heritage Museum.

The pedestrian bridge dates from 1901. The deck is supported by steel beams but the stringers are supported by a truss. The bridge underwent upgrading work in 1992 with a concrete deck and stairs. The station originally had a gatekeeper's cottage which was demolished after 1902.

The brick and timber signal box was opened in 1913 but badly destroyed by bush fire in 1951. The interlocking frame was moved to a lower level and the box continued operating until 1995. The signal box has continued to be occupied by a branch of the NSW Rail Transport Museum.

Valley Heights Locomotive Depot (VHLD) was also completed in 1913, and officially opened on 31 January 1914. The establishment of a new locomotive depot allowed for assistant engines to be attached there (instead of Penrith) for the climb to Katoomba. The engines at Valley Heights not only piloted over the longest distance in NSW, but also had the distinction of having to operate over the longest continual and most steeply graded mainline in Australia. During the peak of the steam era an average of 30 trains during any 24 hour period required a pilot engine from the depot.

From 1913, Valley Heights became an important railway centre and most of the buildings that exist in the depot date from the opening and early period; the ten stall sector roundhouse, a 60' turntable and new offices and sidings were built in 1913, followed by a Station Master's residence and a night-officer's house in 1914. The depot also includes a water tank and archaeological remains of various structures.

The depot continued in operation as a steam locomotive depot until February 1957 when electric locomotive running commenced. The change to electric traction (46 class locomotives) was associated with the electrification of the Main Western line to Lithgow which was completed in late 1957. While the role of the depot in providing pilot engines remained unchanged, the now redundant steam servicing facilities were removed. The pilot engine role of the depot continued into the early 1980s until the placing in service of more powerful electric locomotives (the 85 and 86 classes). Over the intervening years the role of the depot had expanded to include servicing, repair and overhaul of electric locomotives and also goods wagons. In 1989 the depot was closed and was used to store and service track maintenance material until 1993 when the State Rail Authority (SRA) vacated the site.

In 1994, the Blue Mountains Division of the New South Wales Rail Transport Museum established the Valley Heights Locomotive Depot Heritage Museum with the aim of preserving the depot to provide historical, educational and recreational facilities and opportunities for the benefit of the Blue Mountains community and visitor to the region. The Valley Heights Steam Tramway was established in 1997 by the Stream Tram and Railway Preservation (Co-Op) Society Limited.

The locomotive depot continues to be owned by the Transport Asset Manager and is occupied by Transport Heritage NSW doing business as the Valley Heights Locomotive Depot Heritage Museum. The location is known as the Valley Heights Rail Museum.

== Platforms and services ==
Valley Heights has one island platform with two sides. It is serviced by Sydney Trains Blue Mountains Line services travelling from Sydney Central to Lithgow.

Platform	Line	Stopping pattern	Notes
1	Blue Mountains Line	services to Sydney Central	
2	Blue Mountains Line	services to Springwood, Katoomba, Mount Victoria & Lithgow	

== Description ==
The station precinct comprises a type 11, initial island/side platform brick station building, erected in 1902; a brick lamp room/store, erected in 1902; a signal box, erected in 1910. Other station precinct structures include a concrete over brick face platform, erected in 1902; and a standard steel beam on trestles footbridge, over the main up line track and platform, erected in 1901 and modified in 1992.

The locomotive depot precinct comprises a 10 road roundhouse, erected in 1913 and extended 1973; a machine workshop; a members' room/meal room; a members' locker room/toilet; a passageway; a former chargeman's office/district locomotive engineer's (DLE) office, erected in 1913; a former amenities building, erected in 1930; a toilet block, erected in 1965; an air compressor shed; a red brick fuel store, erected in 1970; and a shed, erected in 2008. Other locomotive depot structures include a 18-metre diameter (60 ft) steel turntable, erected in 1914 and modified in 1967; an ash disposal tunnel and pits, erected in 1913; locomotive watering facilities, erected in 1924; trackwork, completed in 1914; trestling foundations, erected in c. 1913; and overhead catenary masts, erected in 1957.

=== Station precinct ===
Station building (1902)

External: Constructed of face brick with corrugated metal gabled roof extending as an awning in the form of broken back to both platforms, the Valley Heights station building is an early phase type 11 initial island/side platform building in standard Federation free classical style design. It has a 6 bay linear arrangement along the platform with tuckpointed brickwork and engaged piers between the bays. Distinctive features are red face brickwork with rendered and moulded two rows of string courses to both rail elevations, timber framed windows and doors with contrasting decorative rendered trims and sills, standard iron brackets over decorative corbels supporting ample platform awnings, fretted timber work to both ends of awnings and gable ends, two tall corbelled chimneys one of which with terracotta pots, timber framed double-hung windows with multi-paned and coloured upper sashes and toughened glass bottom sashes, and timber door openings with multi-paned fanlights with coloured glazing. A face brick privacy wall screens the Men's toilet entry at the eastern end of the building. Two roof vents also exist above the toilet bays. All windows and doors are secured by metal gates and grills. An air-conditioning unit has been installed on the fanlight of the Station Master's office door.

Internal: The station building appears to have maintained most of its original detailing and finishes despite the changes over the time. The original floor layout remains including parcels office and Station Master's office with ticket window looking over the general waiting room, and toilets including an accessible toilet at eastern end. The interiors generally feature custom orb ceilings with ceiling roses, enclosed or adapted fireplaces, moulded picture rails and cornices to the general waiting room, decorative cast iron wall vents, later floor tiling or carpet finish, and timber bead style moulded cornices. All toilet and light fittings are relatively new. The Platform 1 door of the general waiting room and the ladies toilet door have also been fitted with a solid panel at the back.

Lamp room / store (1902)

External: A small square shaped brick shed featuring moulded and rendered string course detailing similar to the main station building. It is located on the west side of the station building towards the end of the platform and is separated visually from the main station building by the stairs leading to the footbridge. The shed features a gabled corrugated metal roof with timber bargeboard and narrow eaves with exposed rafters, contrasting rendered moulded trim above two single doors on east and west side elevations and a band of string course throughout all elevations. There are no other openings on the building and the existing doors have been secured by metal gates.

Internal: The former lamp room is currently used as a storage area and features face brick walls with exposed roof truss structure within the corrugated metal roof. The timber boarded door is in the form of a sliding loading door with a fanlight above.

Signal box (1910)

The signal box was originally built in 1910, constructed with three storeys, two in brick with the upper level constructed in timber cladding. The building was accessed via an external timber stair, on the western side of the building. It was severely damaged by fire in 1951 and the top floor collapsed. A roof was placed on top of the remaining brickwork and a new frame was placed into service on the ground floor.

The first floor level of brickwork was removed in 1987 and steel / urethane sandwich addition was added at the same time for staff amenities. Use of the signal box was discontinued in 1994 and given to the museum. Corrugated metal roofing fabric is relatively new. The signal equipment including CTC panel and 37 lever interlocking frame inside are extant.

The building currently presents a single-storey box with shallow hipped roof. The face brickwork with engaged piers has been painted over in places and the three arched windows along the railway side are intact, although the panes have been painted over and many are broken. The 1987 steel / urethane sandwich extension addition is extensively damaged by white ants.

Platform (1902)

Valley Heights station has an island platform in elliptical curved form, which is wide at the centre and narrow at both ends of the platform. This form is typical of Blue Mountains stations dictated by the topography and the deviation of the railway line. The platform is concrete faced (possible rendered over brick retaining wall) with concrete projecting edge at the top and asphalt finish to the deck. Modern platform furniture including light fittings, signage, timber bench seating and aluminium palisade fencing at both ends of the platform are other features along the platform.

Footbridge (1901, 1992)

Valley Heights Station footbridge is a modified standard steel beam bridge supported on steel trestles extending from the street ramp over the highway and over the Up main tracks with stairs to the island platform between the main station building and the lamp room. The sections beyond the Up main tracks over the highway are a later addition constructed in c.1992 of concrete beam with concrete columns. With the exception of original steel structure and trussed stair stringers (balustrade), it appears that all components of the bridge have been replaced during the 1992 upgrading works.

=== Locomotive depot ===
Roundhouse (1913, extended 1973)

External: The roundhouse building comprises a 1913 main roundhouse and a c. 1973 workshop annex. The roundhouse consisted of 10 bays for the stabling and servicing of steam locomotives, which remains intact to date. The design style of the building incorporates a symmetrically shaped, peaked roof profile with a relatively small ventilating ridge or clerestory gable roof at the centre of the roof peak, approximately 2 feet (600mm) above the main roof. The roundhouse is approximately 65 feet 4 inches in depth (front columns to rear wall). It is constructed with an Oregon timber structural frame with hardwood timber supporting posts (ironbark). The roof is covered by corrugated iron which was originally covered with asbestos tiles or slates, and later with super 6 corrugated fibro.

Internal: Flooring is bedded dry pressed common brick, topped in cement slurry, and there is a section of the flooring where the original brickwork is exposed in bay 10 adjacent to the easternmost wall. The brickwork of the pit walling was originally bagged with lime slurry and featured drainage outlets to all pits. Some of the pits have since been infilled in association with the change to electric over steam locomotives. Smoke chutes were provided at the front and rear but the front were removed prior to 1950 leaving only chutes on the southern or western side of the building enabling ventilation as all locomotives were first taken into the shed. Further ventilation is aided by the clerestory roof. The end walls are fully sheeted with corrugated iron, as is the rear wall below the 7 foot level. Above the iron on the rear walls are Oregon timber window frames, in a multi light awning style (hopper) operated on Austral stays. These sashes alternate with multi light fixed sashes. The bulk of the window frames had been removed for repair and reinstatement. Some windows have also been removed at the western portion of the roundhouse, in association with the construction of the lean to additions.

Machine workshop (1973)

The workshop is constructed in timber and clad in corrugated iron wall and roof sheeting. Sited to the rear of bay 1 of the Roundhouse as an annex, the rail line and track has been extended into the workshop allowing access to rolling stock for repair. The workshop also features a single storey concrete element at the rear and southern side, currently used as a tool store. This is to become a welding bay. The workshop houses machinery used for the restoration of exhibits, e.g. lathes, drills, gantry crane, mills and grinders etc.

Members' room / meal room

The members' room is located to the rear of Bay 5. Like most of the 1960s lean to additions, the room is clad externally in corrugated sheeting and also features timber framed vertically proportioned and double hung hopper windows. Internally the room is clad in hard board sheeting with plasterboard ceiling. Examination of the fabric of the room suggests a further extension to the rear though the dating of this further addition is unknown. The room is used largely as a meeting and meal room for members, with full kitchen facilities installed.

Members' locker room / toilet

The walls and roofing of the shower and toilet are clad in fibro sheeting, with a timber structure supporting the roof cladding. The walls and roofing of the locker room are clad in hard board sheeting, some of which is hanging down exposing insulation. The area is currently used for storage of ladders and other materials.

Passageway

The walls and roofing of the corridor are clad in corrugated iron, with timber structure supporting the roof cladding. The area is currently used as a store; however the space was originally constructed as an external access from the rear of the roundhouse on the south side of the site. The timber door is extant however unused.

Former charwoman's office / District locomotive engineer's (DLE) office (1913)

External: The former office building has recently been restored and now accommodates the museum displays. It is constructed of an Oregon timber frame, supported by brick piers and with A gable roof clad in corrugated steel sheeting. It is rectangular in shape and features simple bargeboards and timber framed louvered ventilation window to the gable ends. A skillion roofed corrugated steel verandah supported on steel round posts covers the front of the building over a concrete slab. The front elevation is fenestrated by three identical timber doors with fanlight. The windows on the rear elevation are also timber framed with a box frame hardwood sill.

Internal: The office maintains its original layout of three rooms that originally were separate but now are connected to each other by door openings. The internal features include tongue and grooved hardwood floor with carpet finish, timber weatherboard wall cladding to full wall height with a splayed and chamfered profile, simple timber skirting and timber board ceiling linings. Security bars are fixed to the interiors of the windows in order to ensure the safety of the collections. Metal picture rails are fixed to the walls for the exhibition of the picture collections. The light fittings are modern pendant style.

Former amenities building (c. 1930, extended 1960)

The building is constructed of rusticated weatherboard with a hipped, corrugated steel roof. Originally rectangular, the building now forms a U-shape with wings and a courtyard. Double-hung windows with multi-pane fenestration are generally vertically proportioned (some in groups) and the frames are timber box frame type with hardwood sills. The main entry is via a projecting skillion roofed partially enclosed porch with original timber framed and glass panelled doors. A brick chimney is the only feature of the roofscape. A metal picket fence separates the courtyard from the track, which is used for the visitors' locomotive experience within the yard.

Internal: Internally the walls and ceilings are lined with plasterboard panels with Oregon timber architraves and skirtings. The floors are concrete with linoleum and carpet finish. The internal doors are later fabric and are made of lightweight hollow core panels with timber frame. The amenities building consists of five rooms, used in the current facility as a library, museum shop for the sale of books, souvenirs and ephemera, a general storage room, a refreshments room, model railway room and one room is used for local Historical Society displays. The building has been adapted and extended from the former amenities facility which was a much smaller building incorporating a locker room, meal room and office facilities.

Toilet block (c. 1965, extended 2006)

A rectangular part face brick part timber framed utility building with corrugated steel gabled roof. It comprises male, female and disabled toilets with privacy walls/partitions to the front. Floors are concrete with tile finish and the fittings are generally new. The majority of the partition walls were replaced as part of the 2006 restoration works and the building was repainted.

Air compressor shed (2005-6)

The air compressor shed is located at the top of the bank adjacent to the Main Western Line and overlooking the Roundhouse. The simple building, which features concrete block flooring, steel structural framing and galvanised iron wall and roof cladding, with pitched roof form, is of recent construction. The building features two roller doors to the western elevation, with aluminium louvered ventilation at the eastern elevation. The shed building replaced an earlier termite damaged building of the same purpose on the site.

Fuel store (1970)

The building is of 1970s red brick construction, with flat roof form, sited to the rear of the open storage yard behind the machine workshop and roundhouse. The building houses dangerous and flammable liquids and accordingly is set well back from the main building zone at the site. Internal access was not available (2009).

Workshop shed (2008)

New large steel framed corrugated steel shed with corrugated steel gabled roof featuring a lantern along the ridgeline for additional ventilation and light. Sections of the roof are of clear corrugated sheeting for improved light. The shed is essentially a large single space in portal style framing with large multi-paned steel windows on both long side elevations while the narrow elevations featuring roller doors to allow easy entry for the locomotives via two sets of siding.

Turntable (1914, 1967)

The 60-foot turntable enables the locating of locomotives onto the respective roads in the roundhouse or for the turning of the locomotives. The turntable is constructed in steel and features timber sleepers at the perimeter of the turning circle. The element is manually operated and is still in use. It is the third such turntable to be used at the site, having been relocated from Katoomba in the 1960s.

Examination of the fabric of the infrastructure suggests some repair to the steel plating of the turntable. The turntable pit originally featured tracks on the northern side of the circle, enabling the locomotive to overshoot the turning circle with no damage to the locomotive. The tracks and associated timbers, however, were removed after the circle was damaged as a result of vandalism.

Ash disposal tunnel and pits (1913)

The ash disposal tunnel is a below-ground-level structure constructed between the running rails of the access and departure roads with two covered ground-level pits. The tunnel was constructed to facilitate the removal of ash from the smoke boxes of the steam locomotives. This required the ash to be raked and shovelled out by hand. The ash would then drop into the tunnel, and a narrow gauge line with hand-operated trolleys was provided in the tunnel for removing the ash as it dropped from the pits. The pits were in use until 1957, when steam operations ceased in the mountains. The tunnel is extant, along with the internal track work for the trolley, and recent landscaping works have uncovered two sets of stone stairs either side of the tunnel entry. The external entry was painted, and it is also likely that the internal brickwork was originally painted or lime-washed.

Locomotive watering facilities (1924)

The complete assemblage of the watering facilities still awaits re-instatement. The water tank has been relocated from ELCAR Workshops and is a 5,000 gallon example. Of standard local design, the tank is of high technical significance and is representative of the many tanks formally seen at depots around the former NSWGR system. The tank would likely have been constructed by the railways in Newcastle. The water column is of a standard pattern though of later design and is representative of the post WWII railway. The restoration of the column on its restored piers and adjacent to the 1914 drainage pit is proposed in near future.

Trackwork (1914)

The current track diagram is a remnant of the former depot layout from the steam era. They are proposed to be restored by reconnecting the arrival and departure roads to a more closely resemble the trackwork of the steam era.

Trestling foundation (c. 1913)

These are remnant foundations of the former coaling plant and demonstrate the scale, design and context of the former coaling plant.

Overhead catenary masts (1957)

The remnant overhead masts are a type of overhead system used in the form of the 46-class electric locomotives demonstrating the arrival of modern motive power in the depot. The masts in the yard are of the first generation design; fabricated, riveted, mild steel preserved with a micaceous paint system.

Moveable items

The following moveable items have been observed at Valley Heights Station:

- A safe (ID #749) with no brand name dating possibly from the 1960s is located in the booking office.
- Two early timber bench style seats in the General Waiting Room.
- An early ticket window desk in the ticket office.

There are a large number of moveable items that belong to the Valley Heights Museum. A Seth Thomas clock has been observed in the model rail room of the Former Amenities Building.

Landscape features

Apart from a couple of garden beds with shrubs and small plantings along the north and south ends of the platform there is no landscaping at the station. The existing station landscaping is not considered significant.

The locomotive depot site has built up gradually with deposits from the ash spoil dump and the site features large concrete retaining walls reinforced with railway sleepers along the southern portion of the site adjacent to the access road. The site incorporates a number of established mature tree and shrub plantings as well as many new plantings dating to the period of occupation of the current tenants. There are also a high proportion of established trees concentrated on the southern side of the Roundhouse. Plantings include a wide variety of native species, including wattle, eucalypts, angophora floribunda (rough barked apple), grevillea and callistemon (bottlebrush) as well as some and non indigenous species including pine and cedar species.

Potential archaeological features

There is high archaeological potential within the locomotive depot site due to the existence of remnant sidings, ash tunnels and trestles foundations.

=== Condition ===
The station building is generally in good condition with minor repair work requirements for repointing and repainting; the lamp room/store is generally in good condition. Some cracks are evident on the eastern wall at the lock height have been observed – possibly result of incompatible cement mortar repairs. The signal box is in moderate to poor condition; the platform and footbridge are both in good condition. The locomotive depot is generally in good condition. Despite being vacant for a number of years prior to the current tenants, the RTM has subsequently undertaken a systematic program of restoration works over time. The roundhouse has undergone some roof replacement, and replacement of the glass in some of the windows.

The Chargeman's Office has recently undergone significant restoration works and is in very good condition. The former amenities building, toilet block, and air compressor shed are all in very good condition. The fuel store is in good condition. The workshop shed is in very good condition. The turntable, ash disposal tunnel and pits, locomotive watering facilities, trackwork, trestling foundations, and overhead catenary masts are all in moderate condition.

The station buildings are intact externally with minor changes to the internal finishes. The station has a high degree of integrity.

The locomotive depot site maintains a reasonable level of integrity in terms of the composition and layout of its buildings and structures, though some changes have taken place.

Roundhouse: Externally, the building retains its typical and original appearance. Even though its original purpose (the servicing of steam locomotives) has been altered to suit newer motive power, with a subsequent change to work methods and equipment, the integrity of the roundhouse has been retained. Internally, the building retains a high degree of integrity due to the retention of original construction features and details. The Chargeman's Office is of moderate integrity; the former amenities building is of high integrity; the toilet block is of moderate integrity; the air compressor shed, fuel store, workshop shed, turntable, and the ash disposal tunnel and pits are all of high integrity; the locomotive watering facilities are of moderate integrity; the trackwork is of moderate integrity; the trestling foundations are of moderate integrity; and the overhead catenary masts are of moderate integrity.

=== Modifications and dates ===
- 27 November 1911 – station destroyed by bushfire,
- 1912 – repairs to station buildings destroyed by bushfire,
- 1914 – new roundhouse and depot brought into use,
- 1924 – additional water supplies at depot,
- 1925 – improvements to facilities, including ash tunnel for locomotive ash handling,
- 1949 – upgrading facilities for crew amenities,
- 1957 – electric locomotives take over from steam locomotives as bank engines,
- 1960s – improvements to allow for servicing and repairs to electric locomotives, members room/meal room lean to addition to Roundhouse, northern wings added to former amenities building (visitor centre and refreshment rooms)
- 1973 – machine workshop annex added
- 1987 – the first floor level of brickwork at signal box was removed in 1987 and a steel / urethane sandwich extension added,
- 1988 – reduced use of bank engines as larger electric locomotives are used on main line work,
- 1992 – footbridge, upgrading work, concrete deck and stairs,
- 1993 – depot closed.
- 1990s – extensive repairs to roundhouse
- 2007-2008 – new work shed constructed near ash disposal tunnel, former amenities building (refreshment room and visitor centre) repaired and refurbished, ongoing work in roundhouse, chargeman's office (museum) repaired and refurbished, ash disposal tunnel cleaned and restored, amenities (toilets) repaired and refurbished
- 2009 – Original water column is in the process of being reinstated
- N.d – Station building, some internal alterations, brick screen to lavatories at southeast end. Barge boards replaced.

== Transport links ==
Blue Mountains Transit operates one bus route via Valley Heights station, under contract to Transport for NSW:

- 690P: Springwood station to Penrith station

== Heritage listing ==
As of 18 November 2010, Valley Heights railway station is of state significance as part of the early construction phase of railway line duplication and deviation between Glenbrook and Springwood demonstrating the technological and engineering achievements in railway construction at the beginning of the 1900s. The station has strong associations with the adjacent Locomotive Depot and is also evidence of development in Valley Heights maintaining its landmark quality within the non-urban townscape. The station building together with the matching lamp room is a good example of a standard island platform building and demonstrates typical architectural elements of the Federation free classical style station buildings that were built across the Blue Mountains with the duplication of the railway line in 1902.

The Valley Heights Locomotive Depot is of state significance as an important locomotive depot, and the principal service and maintenance facility for bank engines working over the Main Western line between Sydney and Lithgow for almost 80 years. The collection of buildings and structures including the roundhouse, former chargeman's office, amenities building, turntable, ash disposal tunnel and pits, locomotive watering facilities, trackwork, trestling foundations and overhead catenary masts provide insight into the workings of an important transport and freight hub at the height of its operation. The place also has a strong industrial aesthetic quality and is of technical and research significance providing valuable information about the age of steam.

The roundhouse building is rare in NSW, being the third roundhouse constructed by the NSW Government Railways, and now the oldest of only seven other remaining roundhouses in the state. This style of building is unique to the railways and there are some building elements of the roundhouse that are unique, principally the roof form, which was not used at any of the other roundhouse sites.

The site has a high level of social significance given its contribution to the development of the town historically, and more importantly, as demonstrated by the strong and continued community interest and involvement with the site. The depot is affiliated with three community and volunteer groups, indicating a strong sense of community involvement and ownership of the site.

Valley Heights railway station was listed on the New South Wales State Heritage Register on 2 April 1999 having satisfied the following criteria.

The place is important in demonstrating the course, or pattern, of cultural or natural history in New South Wales.

The Depot was the first modern depot in NSW. It is the only complete depot built at one time in NSW. The Depot is the only depot built on a curve and in such a restricted area. It was the first depot to have an elevated coal stage on the Western line in NSW. The Depot was the only Depot to utilise parachute style water tanks for watering locomotives on the Western line. The ash disposal method utilised was the most modern in use at the time of being built and is unique to Valley Heights.

The place is important in demonstrating aesthetic characteristics and/or a high degree of creative or technical achievement in New South Wales.

The Valley Heights railway station is aesthetically significant as a good example of the Federation free classical style as used for public and institutional buildings. The station includes both the main building and the lamp building which have been built in matching style and details.

Valley Heights Locomotive Depot is aesthetically significant because of the original fabric and intact architectural features of the 1914 built roundhouse. This style of building is unique to railway buildings and there are some building elements of the site and roundhouse that are unique even to the Valley Heights site, principally the roof form, which was not used at any of the other roundhouse sites. The building also has an aesthetic quality characteristic of roundhouse sites and strongly reflects the industrial character of the site and the occupation by the Railways. The associated buildings and structures including former Chargeman's office, former amenities building, turntable, trackwork, overhead catenary masts, and trestling foundations contribute to the overall aesthetic quality and setting of the depot. The landscaping enhances the setting with its highly established leafy surroundings.

The place has a strong or special association with a particular community or cultural group in New South Wales for social, cultural or spiritual reasons.

Valley Heights Locomotive Depot has social significance because when the site was vacated by the NSW government, there was significant community interest in retention and conservation of the site as a museum and restorative facility. The site is now tenanted by the Blue Mountains Division of Transport Heritage NSW (formerly known as the Rail Transport Museum) and is staffed entirely by volunteers, indicating a strong local community attachment and interest.

The place has potential to yield information that will contribute to an understanding of the cultural or natural history of New South Wales.

The locomotive site is of technical and research significance because the roundhouse and its equipment are the remnants of a past era, located in an area of the state where railways played so much a part in development and essential transport of goods and passengers. As one of the very few surviving railway roundhouses, the complex gives valuable information about the age of steam. The depot at Valley Heights provides an insight into the workings of an important transport and freight hub at the height of its operation.

The signal box is also of research significance due to its ability in providing evidence of its associated signalling equipment and very limited ability on the construction techniques and architectural character of an originally three-storey brick signal box via its remnant ground floor structure.

The place possesses uncommon, rare or endangered aspects of the cultural or natural history of New South Wales.

This item is assessed as historically rare. This item is assessed as scientifically rare. This item is assessed as arch. rare. This item is assessed as socially rare.

The place is important in demonstrating the principal characteristics of a class of cultural or natural places/environments in New South Wales.

Valley Heights Station Group is a representative example of an island platform with footbridge created in response to the duplication of the line in 1902 incorporating a good example of a group of Federation free classical style standard station buildings. This type of island platform station building with lamp room were commonly used later during 1910s and 1920s. The footbridge, although refurbished, is representative of steel footbridges with trussed stair stringers that survive today. The signal box is no longer representative of its type as its original form has been lost.

Valley Heights Locomotive Depot is a representative example of such a facility reflecting typical composition of a locomotive depot and principal characteristics of associated buildings, including form, construction methods, materials and operating components. The site reflects a typical locomotive depot layout and composition, and while the site has been compromised to some extent through the removal of certain elements and the addition of new facilities, it is still possible to ascertain the original workings of the depot. Valley Heights roundhouse represents a class of industrial building which has almost disappeared from the state. The associated buildings and structures including former Chargeman's office, former amenities building, turntable, trackwork, overhead catenary masts, trestling foundations are all individually representative of their type.

== Gallery ==
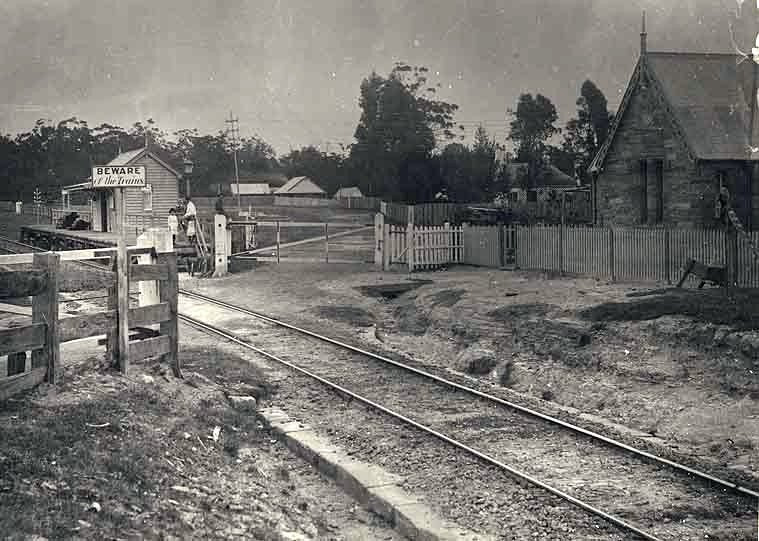
The Valley Heights railway station, c. 1878

== See also ==
- List of railway stations in New South Wales
- Valley Heights railway gatehouse
- Valley Heights Rail Museum
