= Valley Heights Steam Tram Rolling Stock =

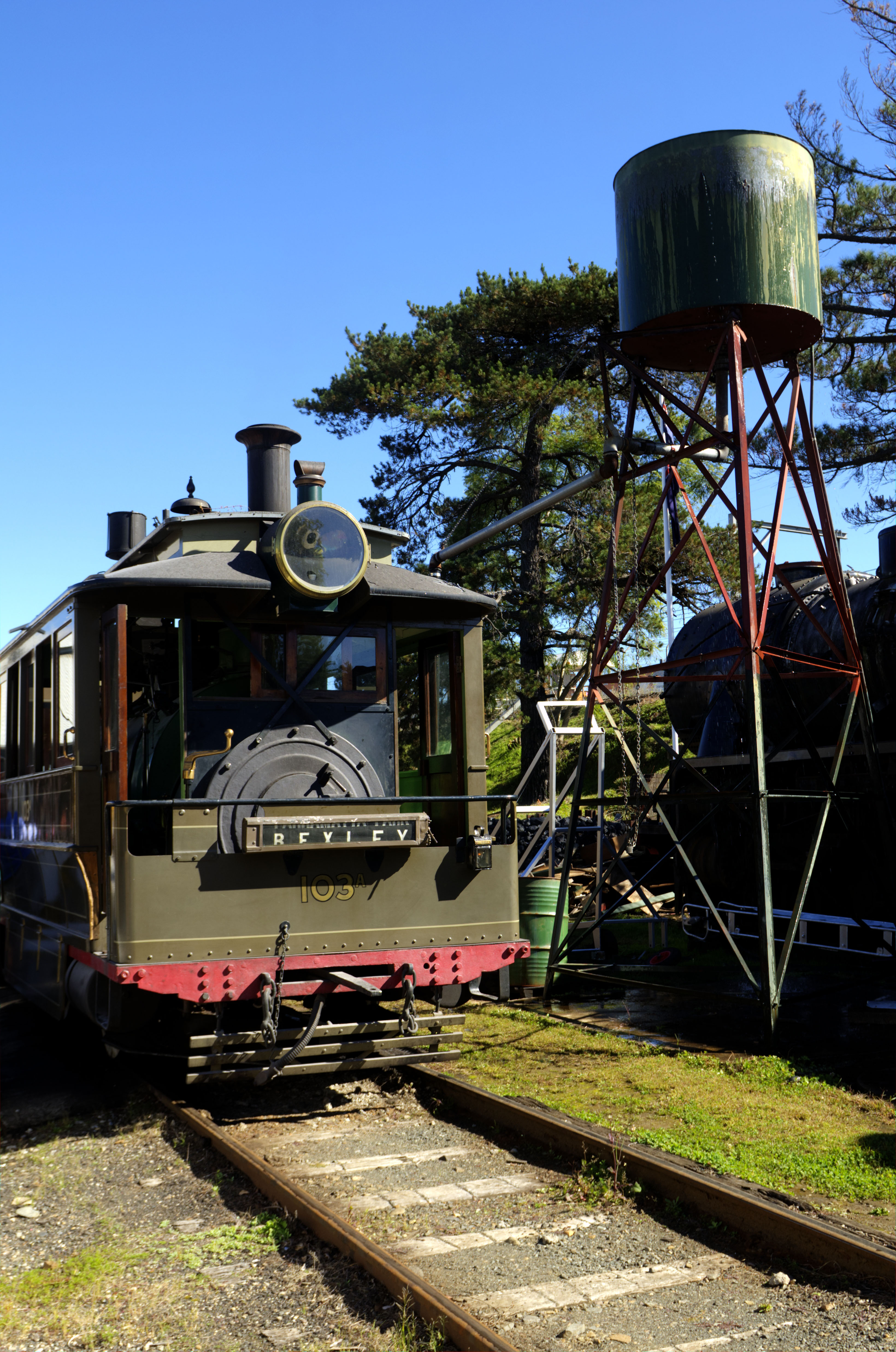
- Steam Tram Motor 103A, built in 1891

- Location in New South Wales Valley Heights Steam Tram Rolling Stock (Australia)
- 33°42′08″S 150°34′52″E
- Location: 17b Tusculum Road, Valley Heights, City of Blue Mountains, New South Wales, Australia

History
- Built: 1889–1891

Site notes
- Owner: Steam Tram and Railway Preservation (Co-op) Society Ltd

New South Wales Heritage Register
- Official name: Valley Heights Steam Tram Rolling Stock
- Type: State heritage (movable / collection)
- Criteria: a., c., d., e., f., g.
- Designated: 21 October 2016
- Reference no.: 1977
- Type: Railway Machinery & Objects
- Category: Collections

Valley Heights Steam Tram Rolling Stock is a heritage-listed collection of tramway machinery at 17b Tusculum Road, Valley Heights, City of Blue Mountains, New South Wales, Australia. It was built from 1889 to 1891. The property is owned by Steam Tram and Railway Preservation (Co-op) Society (Community Group). It was added to the New South Wales State Heritage Register on 21 October 2016.

== History ==
In 1879 to facilitate travel to the International Exhibition, to be held in the Garden Palace in the Botanic Gardens, a steam tramline from the railway terminus to Hunter Street via Elizabeth Street was constructed as a stop-gap measure. The new steam tramway was an immediate success. Nearly half a million passengers were conveyed, an average of more than 4,000 per day. Further, the return on the capital invested was high around 33 per cent.

In light of this success, a bill authorising the NSW Government to construct tramways throughout the city and its suburbs was given assent in April 1880.

This began an era of rapid growth in the tramway network-from 2.5 knots (4.6 km/h; 2.9 mph) in 1879 to almost 50 kilometres (31 mi) in 1884. The peak of the service was reached during 1894, when the length of the tramway reached 64 kilometres (40 mi) when there were over 100 steam trams in service. Intense competition from horse buses saw trams racing buses along various routes.

While the new steam trams were speedy, economical and reliable, they also had environmental impacts, causing high levels of dust, noise and smoke in the city street.

Steam trams of the type represented in this collection of moveable heritage were particular to NSW. Steam tramways featured in Sydney and immediate suburbs (1879-1907), together with the Parramatta-Castle Hill (1902-1923/26), Manly-Brookvale (1903-1911), Arncliffe-Bexley (1909-1926), Cronulla-Sutherland (1909-1932), Kogarah-Sans Souci (1887-1937), Ashfield-Mortlake (1891-1901-1912). Systems also evolved in Newcastle and suburbs, Maitland (1909-1926). Plans were drawn up for systems in Wollongong and Lismore but did not eventuate.

Postal services were improved, including the provision of mobile post boxes on some trams. The expression "Shooting through like a Bondi tram," referred to the express mail services using the steam tram to Bondi Beach. On the Newcastle and Sutherland lines, a hearse car was attached on occasion to enable interments at Sandgate and Woronora cemeteries.

The steam tram systems in Sydney and Newcastle formed the foundation of the electric tram systems that succeeded them in the twentieth century. In other centres they were succeeded by bus transport.

In its heyday in the 1920s the NSW steam tramway network was the biggest in Australia and the second largest system in the world. It was an important element in the development of public street transport in NSW.

The moveable heritage collection of three examples of steam tram rolling stock held at Valley Heights is managed by the 'Steam Tram and Railway Preservation (Co-op) Society Ltd'and displayed, operated and maintained by a variety of volunteer organisations. The depot where the rolling stock is housed is affiliated with the Transport Heritage Workers Volunteer Group, indicating a strong sense of community involvement and ownership of the site.

Contemporary visitors may ride on the steam tram and thus experience a lively simulation of what it may have been like for people travelling by this mode of public transport in the late nineteenth and early twentieth centuries. It is a popular resource for school excursions studying transport development, senior study groups and overseas enthusiast visitors.

Steam Tram Motor 103A
Built in 1891 by Baldwin Locomotive Works, USA.

- Began service on Sydney tramway system on arrival in NSW in 1891
- Later, saw service on various suburban lines including, Arncliffe- Bexley, Kogarah-Sans Souci, Cronulla- Sutherland.

Trailer Car 93B
Built in 1891 by Hudson Bros. of Granville.
- 1889-1913 - General Sydney area
- 1914-1919 - Rockdale line as trailer car for electric trams
- 1920-1923 - Castle Hill line
- 1924-1927 - Arncliffe - Bexley line
- 1927-1932 - Storage at Randwick
- 1932-1996 - Sold to private owner, Miss King, thence used as part of a residence at Hillcrest Road Berowra. Bogies and interior seating were removed.
- 1996 - 1997 - Ownership transferred to K. Booth
- 1997 - purchased by Society, transferred to Valley Heights. The roof, 70% of the sub-frame and one side of the tram was intact. The balance of the car has been restored in accordance with original joinery/casting/ fixing techniques at time of original construction.

Trailer Car 72
Built in 1889 by Henry Vale and Co. Sydney.
- 1889- 1909 - Believed to be in use in general Sydney area.
- 1909 - Used at opening of Arncliffe-Bexley line
- 1920 - 1927 - Alternated between Castle Hill and Arncliffe
- 1927 - 1932 - Storage at Randwick (?)
- 1932 - 1997 - Sold to private owner, Miss King, thence used as part of a residence at Hillcrest Road Berowra.
- 1997 - Purchased by Society, transferred to Valley Heights.

Comparisons

- The Sydney Tramway Museum: The Sydney Tramway Museum is Australia's oldest tramway museum and the largest in the southern hemisphere, located in Loftus in the southern suburbs of Sydney. The museum has an extensive collection of electric trams from Sydney and cities in Australia and around the world. There are two tram lines from the museum used to run tram rides for museum visitors. All the trams in this museum are electric trams.
- Powerhouse Museum: The powerhouse is a technology and society museum, covering many things including transport. Trams to be found here include Baldwin steam tram motor No. 1A (1879), a Cclass, an O-class and an R-class electric tram. The Valley Heights rolling collection is unique in that it is focused on steam trams and has one of the few remaining steam tram engines and two carriages one completed, one partly completed and a replica of a double decker carriage. The Sydney Tramway museums have a mixture of trains and also electric trams but the only other steam tram is located within the Powerhouse Museum.
- There are no other trams currently listed on the State Heritage Register.

== Description ==
The moveable collection of steam tram rolling stock at Valley Heights consists of 3 examples of tram rolling stock: one locomotive manufactured in the US and two trailer cars manufactured in Sydney:

1. Steam Tram Motor 103A: This locomotive was built in 1891 at Baldwin Locomotive Works, USA. It is a 0-4-0 saturated steam locomotive, designed specifically for street use. The motor has been fully restored and is operational.
2. Trailer Car 93B: This carriage was built in 1891 by Hudson Bros. of Granville. A 70-seat trailer car commonly used in combinations of 2, 3 or 4 with steam tram motors as motive power. Local design. Further details: Timber bodied, reinforced strategically with tension rodding and steel plate, cross bench seating made up into two open and six closed compartments accessed by sliding doors from sides. 70 seat capacity. Wheel bogies compositely constructed from timber and castings set with coil spring suspension. The trailer car has been restored and is operational.
3. Trailer Car 72: Built in 1889 by Henry Vale and Co. Sydney. A 70-seat trailer car, very similar to 93B. Only surviving tramcar built by this manufacturer. Presently being stabilized, to prevent further deterioration. The trailer car is in poor condition. Is being stabilized to save roof, sub-frame and other salvables.

=== Condition ===
As at 19 February 2016, Steam Tram 103A is in excellent condition as it has been fully restored. Trailer Car 93B has also in good condition as it has been fully restored Trailer car 72 is in poor condition and was stabilised to save roof, sub-frame and other salvables Currently car 72 is being restored at Valley Heights.

== Heritage listing ==
As at 16 March 2016, The Steam Tram Rolling Stock Collection is of state heritage significance as a remnant of the state government-provided steam tram network in NSW which was in operation between the 1880s and the 1930s. This street-based public transport, which supplemented the rail networks in Sydney and Newcastle, broadened social outlets and employment opportunities, especially for lower income people. The collection, comprising two carriages and one locomotive, has state technical significance as a rare showcase of steam tram rolling stock technology, both imported and locally manufactured. Two of the examples of rolling stock were adaptively designed and manufactured in NSW and thus demonstrate the design and craft expertise of their Sydney manufacturers. The rolling stock demonstrates construction methods of joinery and fitting from an early stage in the development of public street transport. They form the only operational collection of steam tram engine and carriages in NSW and are among the last remaining representatives of this type of rolling stock in NSW. The collection is of state social significance to the many enthusiasts of historic train technology and historic steam technology. Riding on these steam tram trailer cars provides a live sensory experience today of what street transport was like for people of the late nineteenth and early twentieth centuries.

Valley Heights Steam Tram Rolling Stock was listed on the New South Wales State Heritage Register on 21 October 2016 having satisfied the following criteria.

The place is important in demonstrating the course, or pattern, of cultural or natural history in New South Wales.

This collection of steam tram rolling stock is of state historical significance as a remnant of the steam tram network in operation in NSW between the 1880s and the 1930s. In Sydney, steam trams were the first form of transport to impact to the greatest extent on freeing working-class people from the confines of their immediate community for the purposes of employment, recreation and socialising. Because tram timetables were well designed to connect with train stations and rail services, the steam tram service gave greater scope for distance travel within better time frames.

The place is important in demonstrating aesthetic characteristics and/or a high degree of creative or technical achievement in New South Wales.

The collection is of state aesthetic and technical significance as a rare showcase of steam tram rolling stock technology, both imported and locally manufactured. Trailer cars 72 and 93B were designed and manufactured in NSW in the late nineteenth century and demonstrate the design and craft expertise of their Sydney manufacturers, Hudson Brothers and Henry Vale & Co. Successive local modifications demonstrated by these cars enhanced the efficiency and safety aspect of the local product over the imported originals (e.g. safety gate mechanism 1906 and redesigned controls from two to one person operation, 1906.

The place has a strong or special association with a particular community or cultural group in New South Wales for social, cultural or spiritual reasons.

This collection of three examples of steam tram rolling stock held at Valley Heights is of state social significance to the many enthusiasts of historic train technology and historic steam technology from all over NSW. A dedicated group of volunteers are engaged in the restoration and maintenance of this collection and regularly make it accessible to the public.

The place has potential to yield information that will contribute to an understanding of the cultural or natural history of New South Wales.

The Valley Heights Steam Tram Rolling Stock is of research significance at a state level because it demonstrates construction methods of joinery and fitting from an early stage in the development of public street transport. The steam-generated vacuum brake system in the 93B carriage, which is in working condition, was a 19th-century development which was associated almost exclusively with steam trams in government service.

The place possesses uncommon, rare or endangered aspects of the cultural or natural history of New South Wales.

This moveable heritage collection of three examples of steam tram rolling stock held at Valley Heights is of state significance for its rarity as the only collection of operational steam tram carriages in NSW. These three carriages are among the last remaining representatives of this type of carriage manufacture in NSW. The 193B carriage is one of only three remaining in NSW in salvable condition. The Eames Vacuum brake system is the only surviving example of this type of system in Australia.

The place is important in demonstrating the principal characteristics of a class of cultural or natural places/environments in New South Wales.

This collection of steam tram rolling stock is of state significance as representative examples of early steam tram transportation in NSW. The 72 and 93B are typical examples of trailer cars which once formed the mainstay of Sydney's steam tram system, and the 103A locomotive is now the only operational one in Australia of the group of similar engines that powered the steam tram network.

== Photo gallery ==
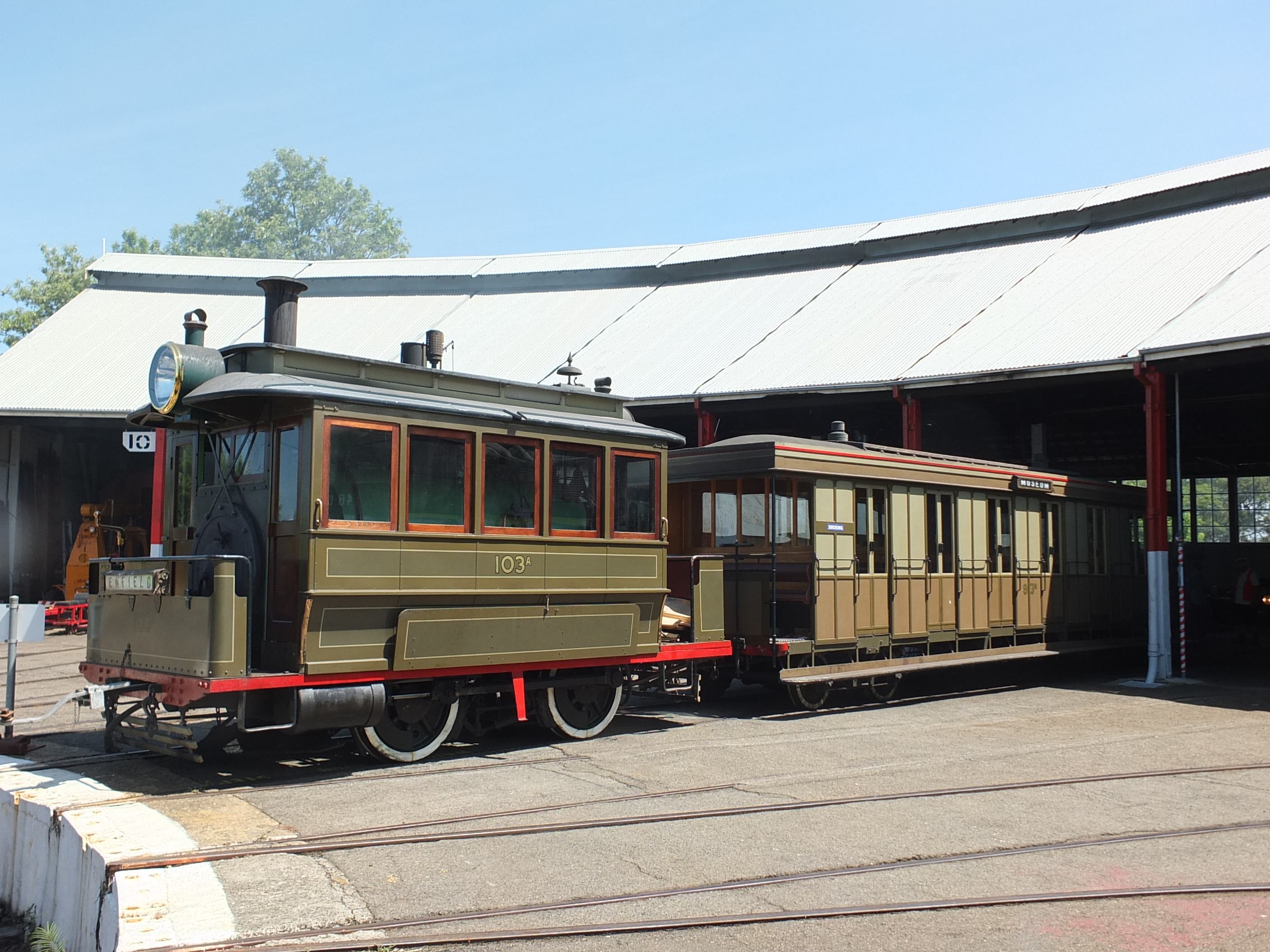
Sydney Steam Tram 103A and Trailer 72B at Valley Heights Rail Museum 2015-12-06

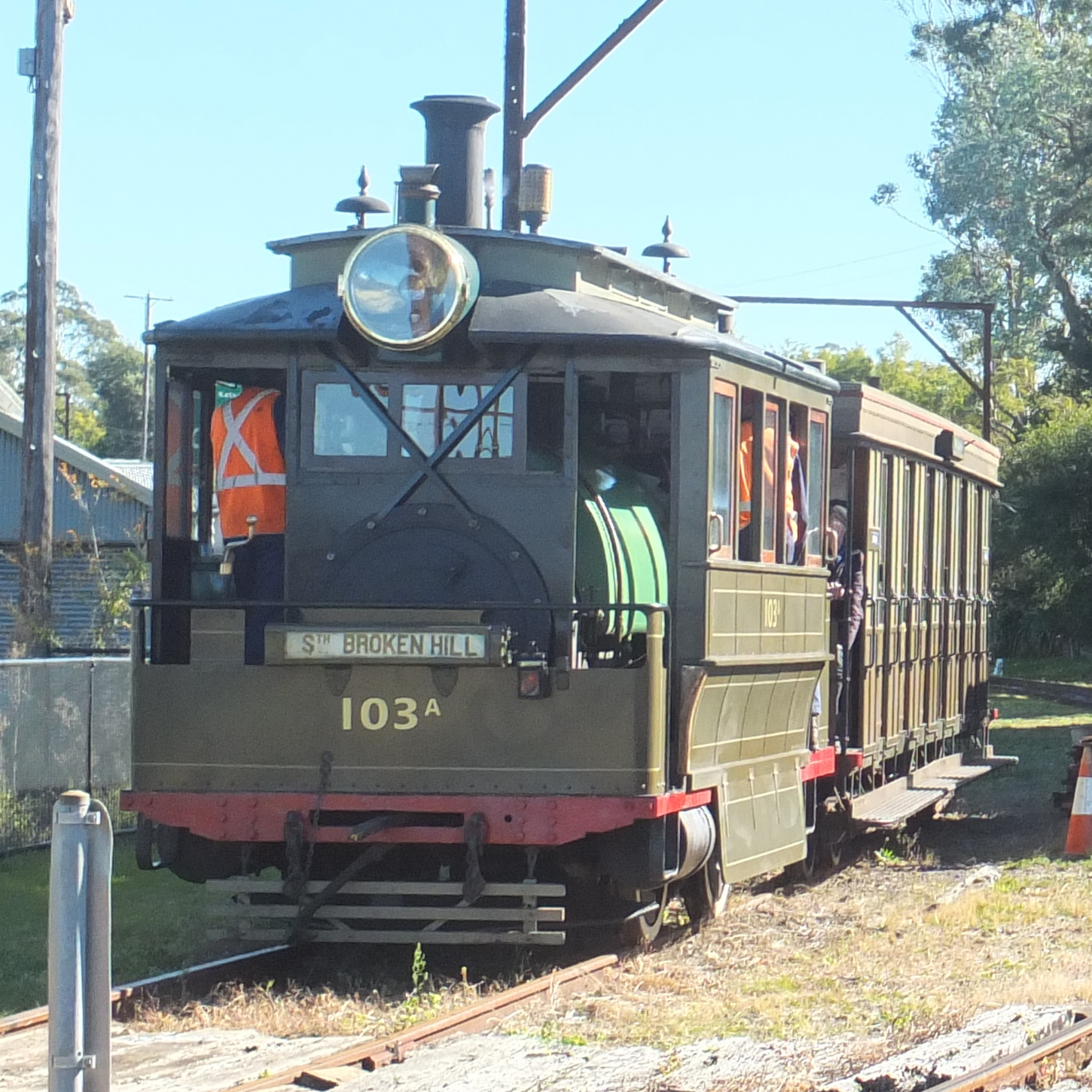
Sydney Steam Tram 103A and Trailer 72B at Valley Heights Rail Museum 2023-07-08

== See also ==
- Valley Heights Locomotive Depot Heritage Museum
