= Valley Heights =

- Town
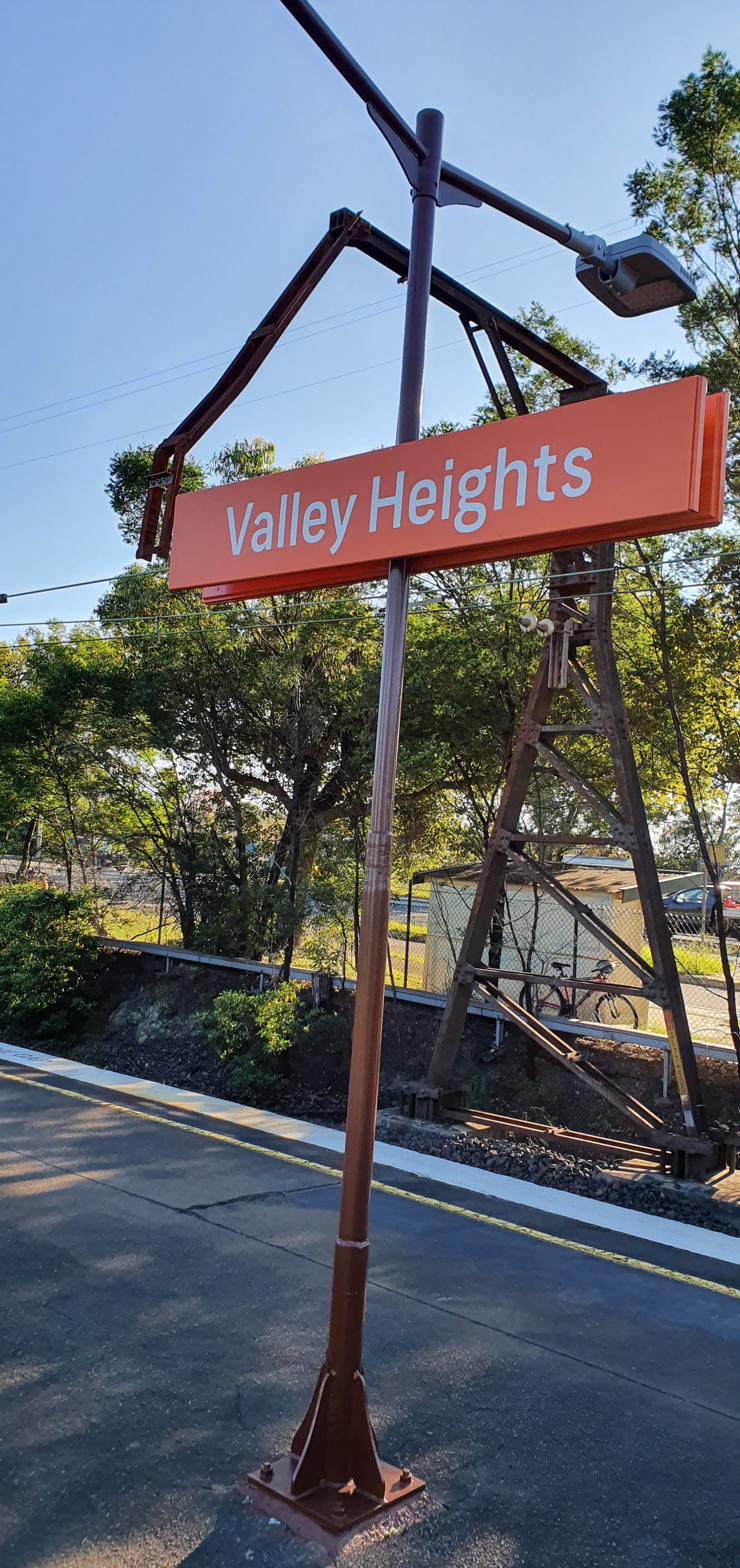
- Valley Heights train station

- Interactive map of Valley Heights
- Coordinates: 33°42′S 150°35′E
- Country: Australia
- State: New South Wales
- LGA: City of Blue Mountains
- Location: 70 km (43 mi) W of Sydney CBD; 33 km (21 mi) E of Katoomba

Government
  - State electorate: Blue Mountains
  - Federal division: Macquarie
- Elevation: 310 m (1,020 ft)

Population
  - Total: 1,188 (2021 census)
- Postcode: 2777
Localities around Valley Heights
Springwood	Springwood	Hawkesbury Heights
Springwood	Valley Heights	Warrimoo
Springwood	Megalong Valley	Warrimoo

Valley Heights is a small township of the City of Blue Mountains in New South Wales, Australia. It is about 70 km (43 mi) from the Sydney central business district and is located east of the township of Springwood. At the 2021 census, Valley Heights had a population of 1,188 people.

Valley Heights developed its own piece of the ridgeline that has been the main route west from Sydney since colonial history, and has some strong evidence of a rich pre-colonial inhabitance. At an elevation of 300 to 320 metres (980–1,050 ft) above sea level, the climate has been considered very conducive to a huge range of plants. The native ecological communities are fairly typical of other Hawkesbury sandstone with shale transition forests, yet exhibit the local specificness we have come to expect in the Blue Mountains, NSW. Current development is restricted by council reserves and National Park

Valley Heights has a railway station, rail museum and the historic Gatekeepers cottage where the gatekeeper employed by the railway lived in the early steam era.

== History ==
Aboriginal People, mostly of the Dharug and Gundungurra people, lived in the area for thousands of years prior to European colonisation.

One of the First mentions of the area by Colonisers was by William Cox in 1814 during the Construction of the first road across the Blue Mountains. Referencing what it now known as sun valley he noted: " Water and Forest growth in the valley to the right".

Some of the First europeans to come in the area where attracted to the flat area and rich soil of Sun Valley. Which was conveniently located close to the Western Road and made it a prime resting spot for Farmers transporting Cattle from Bathurst to Sydney.

In 1830 "The Valley Inn" was established, later renamed the Woolpack and then the Welcome Inn. In 1847 Governor Fitzroy Stayed there. Following the Establishment of the Railway line the Inn went out of business and the property was purchased by Geoffrey Eager in 1870 as a mountains home. In 1902 he renamed the Inn Wyoming and operated as a boarding home until 1937 when it was demolished.

He established a private Railway station there, called Eagers Platform. In 1877 it was renamed to "The Valley" Station. In 1880 it was renamed to the "Valley Heights Station" becoming the location of the modern Valley Heights railway station.

The Railway Station was destroyed by a bush fire in 1911. In 1913 a locomotive depot was established. Due to the steep gradient around the station two major crashes occurred during this time period. In 1923 a goods train crashed near the station and in 1926 a train lost control and slid down the mountains before being stopping in Blaxland. The Station was electrified in 1957.

In 1989 the Depot was closed and used to store material until 1993. In 1994 The Valley Heights Locomotive Depot Heritage Museum was established on the site of the depot and a steam tramway was added in 1997.

== Heritage listings ==
Valley Heights has a number of heritage-listed sites, including:

- 110 and 112 Green Parade: Valley Heights railway gatehouse
- Main Western railway: Valley Heights railway station
- 17b Tusculum Road: Valley Heights Steam Tram Rolling Stock

== Commercial area ==
Valley Heights' commercial area centres on and north of the Great Western Highway, comprising light industrial and hardware retail services.

== Churches ==
- St Marks Anglican Church operated in Valley Heights for many years before closing in the late 1980s.
- Valley Heights Community Church met at Blue Mountains Grammar Valley Heights campus, as part of Anglican Churches Springwood from 2005 to 2012. This congregation has now merged with Factory Morning Church at Anglican Churches Springwood.

== Schools ==
- The Preparatory Campus of the Blue Mountains Grammar School was built in Valley Heights in 2003.
- Other primary and secondary schools are in nearby Springwood and Winmalee

== Transport ==
=== Railway ===
Valley Heights has a railway station on the Blue Mountains Line of the NSW TrainLink intercity network.

Valley Heights is the start of the steeply graded, 1 in 33 (3%) section to Katoomba. The gradient approaching Valley Heights from Sydney is 1 in 60 (1.67%). In older times, assistant engines were attached here to uphill trains, which explains the existence of the roundhouse, now the Valley Heights Locomotive Depot Heritage Museum.

A number of rail heritage items in Valley Heights are listed on the New South Wales State Heritage Register:

- The railway station and the locomotive depot including the roundhouse
- The railway gatehouse in Greens Parade, Valley Heights
- Steam tram rolling stock held at the Valley Heights locomotive depot
- a cattle van, a brake van, and two preserved steam engines

=== Bus ===
Blue Mountains Transit (formerly Pearce Omnibus and later Blue Mountains Bus Company) headquarters and depot are located in Valley Heights.

== Tourist attractions ==
Valley Heights Locomotive Depot Heritage Museum is the home of the oldest remaining roundhouse in New South Wales, located 500 m from the eastern Springwood town boundary.
