= Valley Heights Rail Museum =

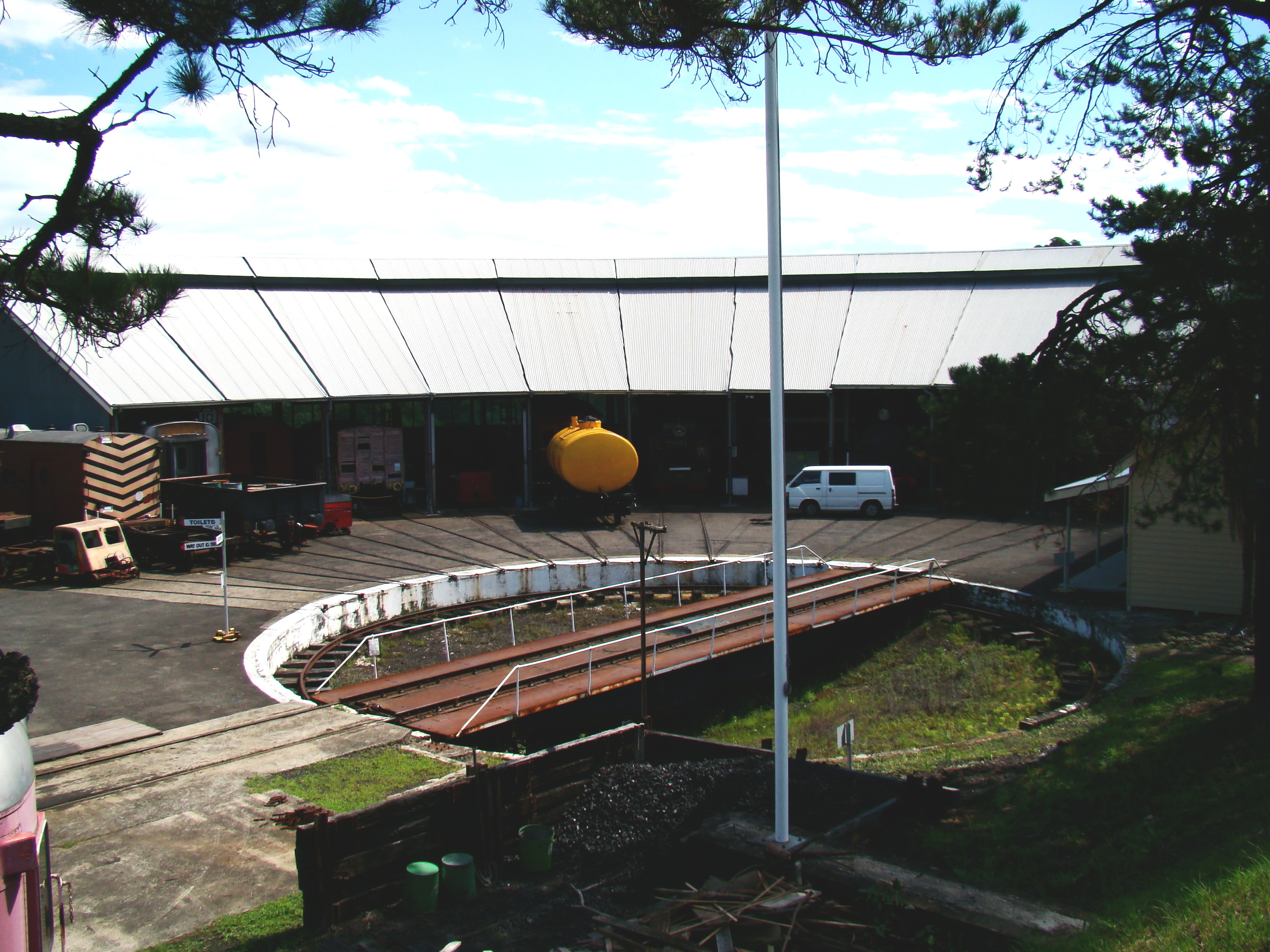
- The roundhouse, pictured in 2007
- Established: 1994
- Location: 17B Tusculum Road, Valley Heights, New South Wales, Australia
- Coordinates: 33°42′10″S 150°34′52″E
- Type: Railway museum
- Key holdings: Valley Heights Steam Tram Rolling Stock
- Parking: On site
- Website: www.valleyheightsrailmuseum.info

The Valley Heights Rail Museum is a railway museum located in Valley Heights, New South Wales, Australia. The facility is located 400 metres (1,300 ft) north-west of Valley Heights railway station. The museum is operated by two partner organisations:

- The Valley Heights Locomotive Depot Heritage Museum (VHLDHM), is the Blue Mountains Division of Transport Heritage NSW.
- The Valley Heights Steam Tramway (a business name of the Steam Tram and Railway Preservation (Co-op) Society) is the operator of historic steam trams and trains within the former locomotive depot.

== Locomotive depot ==
The heritage-listed locomotive depot was constructed in 1913 when the duplication of the Main Western railway line between Emu Plains and Glenbrook was completed. The depot was available for service from December 1913, but was not officially opened until 31 January 1914. With the duplication and regrading of the line, the heavy grades below Valley Heights were eliminated, the ruling gradient from Penrith to Valley Heights being 1 in 60.

The depot at Valley Heights consisted of a locomotive yard, a 10 bay roundhouse, 18.3-metre (60 ft) turntable, an elevated coal stage, and water tanks and columns. It provided bank engines for trains travelling to Katoomba and beyond. The engines at Valley Heights not only banked over the longest distance in NSW, but also had the envious distinction of having to operate over the longest continual and most steeply graded mainline in Australia. The 33 kilometre section from Valley Heights to Katoomba rises 670 metres, with a ruling gradient of 1 in 33.

During the steam era, the depot had a continual allotment of eight freight and two passenger engines. During the peak of the steam era, an average of 30 trains during any 24-hour period required banking from Valley Heights to Katoomba.

The line was electrified to Valley Heights in October 1956. In February 1957, steam operations from Valley Heights were replaced by the 46 class electric locomotives.

The depot in latter years was an electric locomotive and freight wagon repair workshop, the electric engines receiving everything from minor repairs to complete overhauls at the depot. A variety of freight wagons were also repaired. The demise of Valley Heights depot began when the more powerful 85 class locomotives were introduced in 1979. The demise was accelerated with the introduction of the 86 class locomotives in early 1983. From the mid-1980s, the number of trains requiring banking from Valley Heights had been reduced to a handful each day, the number of locomotives required for this duty being reduced to three, sometimes as few as two being necessary.

In October 1988, it was announced the depot would close. One electric locomotive remained available for any bank work necessary, until the last week of January 1989, when 4627 had the distinction operating the last train to be banked from Valley Heights to Katoomba.

Milestones included:

- 1911 – railway station destroyed by bushfire
- 1912 – repairs to railway station buildings destroyed by bushfire
- 1914 – new roundhouse and depot brought into use
- 1924 – additional water supplies at depot
- 1925 – improvements to facilities, including ash tunnel for locomotive ash handling
- 1949 – upgrading facilities for crew amenities
- 1953 – the only fatality in the depot's history when Hendrikus Trip killed walking on the main line
- 1957 – electric locomotives take over from steam locomotives as bank engines
- 1960s – improvements to allow for servicing and repairs to electric locomotives, members room/meal room, visitor centre and refreshment rooms added
- 1973 – machine workshop annex added
- 1987 – the first floor level of brickwork at signal box was removed in 1987 and extension added
- 1988 – reduced use of bank engines as larger electric locomotives are used on main line work
- 1992 – footbridge, upgrading work, concrete deck and stairs
- 1993 – depot closed
- 1990s – extensive repairs to roundhouse
- 2014 – centenary of depot and official opening of museum by Governor Marie Bashir
- 2017 – sesqui centenary of opening western line to Weatherboard (now Wentworth Falls)
- 2018 – major renovation of roundhouse forecourt
- 2021 – new steel and concrete retaining wall

== Museum ==
In 1994, the Blue Mountains Division of the New South Wales Rail Transport Museum (now Transport Heritage NSW) established the Valley Heights Locomotive Depot Railway Museum, with the aim of preserving the depot to provide historical, educational and recreational facilities and opportunities for the benefit of the Blue Mountains community and visitor to the region.

Following the destruction of the Parramatta Park Tramway by fire in June 1993, the Valley Heights Steam Tramway was established in 1997 by the Stream Tram and Railway Preservation (Co-Op) Society Limited and its remaining assets were also transferred to Valley Heights.

In 2007/08, the museum built a new work shed constructed near ash disposal tunnel, former amenities building (refreshment room and visitor centre) repaired and refurbished, ongoing work in roundhouse, chargeman's office (museum) repaired and refurbished, ash disposal tunnel cleaned and restored, amenities (toilets) were repaired and refurbished.

== Heritage status ==
Together with the Valley Heights railway station, the locomotive depot was listed on the New South Wales State Heritage Register on 2 April 1999. The depot is considered "of state significance as an important locomotive depot, and the principal service and maintenance facility for bank engines working over the Main Western line between Sydney and Lithgow for almost 80 years".

Valley Heights Steam Tram Rolling Stock displayed and operated at the museum is also listed on the State Heritage Register as 'collection of steam tram rolling stock is of state historical significance as a remnant of the steam tram network in operation in NSW between the 1880s and the 1930s.

== Centenary ==
On 31 January 2014, the museum celebrated the centenary of the opening of the depot, with a special ceremony featuring speeches from the NSW governor Marie Bashir and NSW premier Barry O'Farrell. The governor formally opened the museum during this event, which received extensive coverage on local and state media.

== Museum exhibits ==
The museum's collection of railway locomotives, carriages, wagons and other railway equipment includes:

Locomotives
No	Description	Manufacturer	Year	Status	Ref	NSW Heritage Office	Custodian
103A	0-4-0T Steam saddle tank tram engine	Baldwin Locomotive Works	1891	operating exhibit	Exhibit information, Steam tram motor 103A	Valley Heights Steam Tram Rolling Stock	Valley Heights Steam Tramway
CPC2	0-6-0T Steam loco	Robert Stephenson & Company	1899	operating exhibit	Exhibit information, Stephenson Locomotive No CPC 2		Valley Heights Steam Tramway
1022	0-4-0T Steam saddle tank	Vulcan Iron Works	1916	in parts under restoration	Exhibit information, Locomotive 1022		Valley Heights Steam Tramway
1308	4-4-2T Steam passenger loco	Beyer, Peacock & Company	1877	parts only	Exhibit information, Locomotive 1308	Locomotive, Steam 1307	Valley Heights Steam Tramway
3214	4-6-0 Steam passenger loco	Beyer, Peacock & Company	1891	static exhibit	Exhibit information, Locomotive 3214		Valley Heights Loco Depot Heritage Museum
5461	2-8-0 Steam goods loco	Clyde Engineering	1915	static exhibit	Exhibit information, Locomotive 5461	Locomotive, Steam 5461	Valley Heights Loco Depot Heritage Museum
5711	4-8-2 Steam goods loco	Clyde Engineering	1929	static exhibit	Exhibit information, Locomotive 5711	Locomotive, Steam 5711	Valley Heights Loco Depot Heritage Museum
4601	Co-Co Electric loco	Metropolitan Vickers	1956	static exhibit	Exhibit information, Locomotive 4601		Valley Heights Loco Depot Heritage Museum
X206	0-4-0 Diesel mechanical shunting loco	Chullora Railway Workshops	1963	operating exhibit	Exhibit information, Locomotive X206		Valley Heights Loco Depot Heritage Museum

The museum publishes historical and technical details of exhibits on its website.

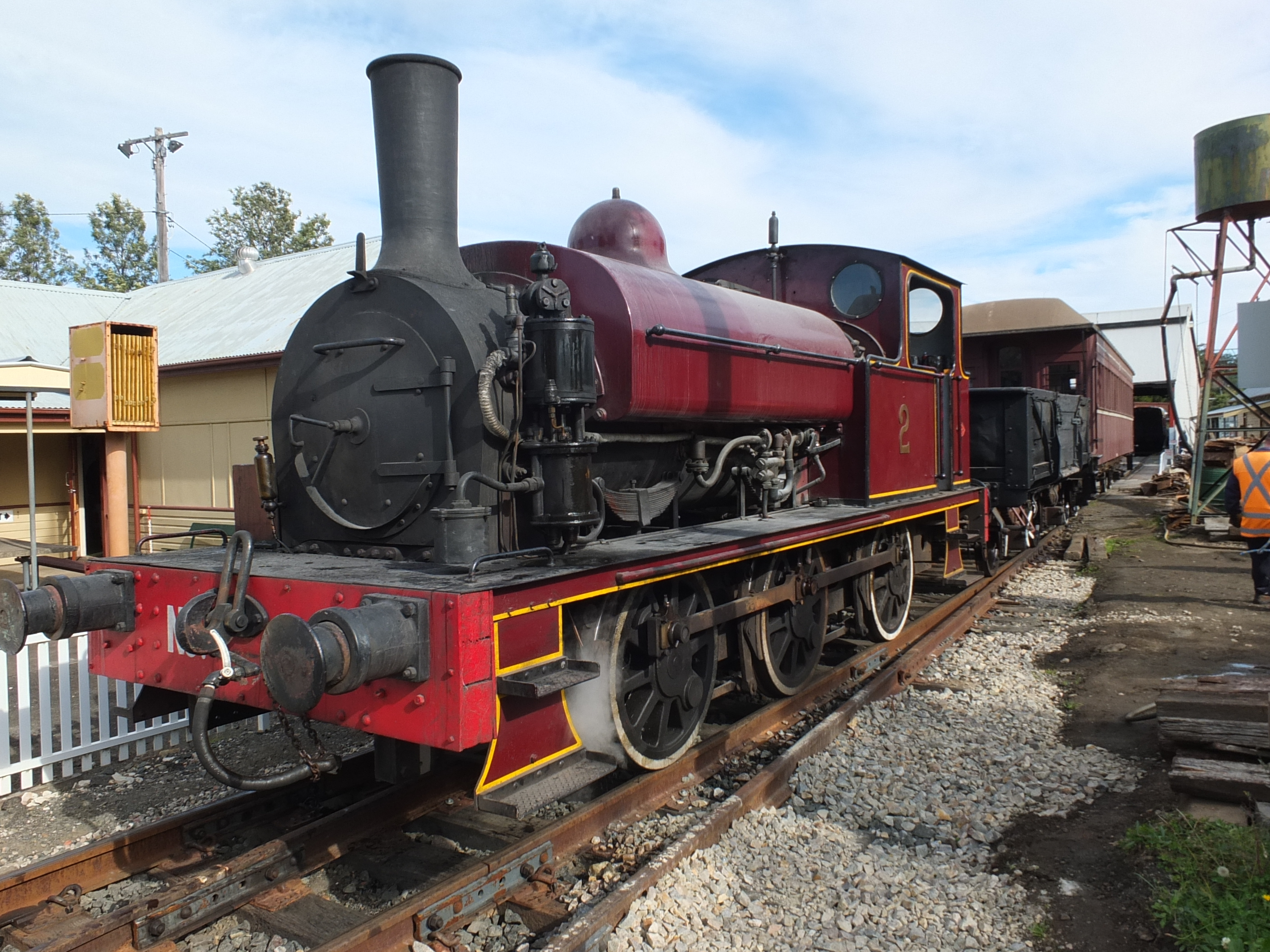
Valley Heights Mixed train at Valley Heights Locomotive Depot Heritage Museum

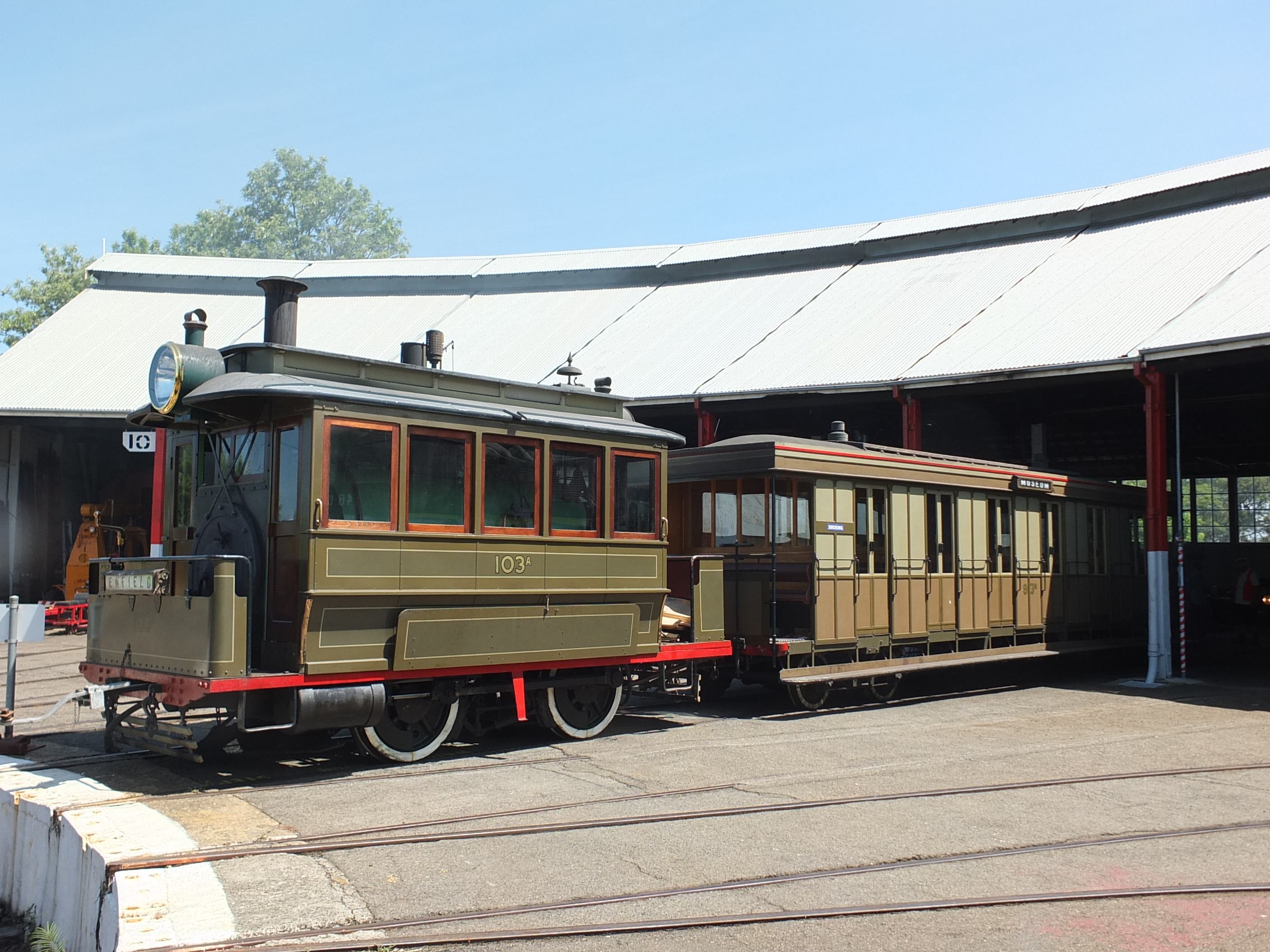
NSWGR Steam Tram and Trailer at Valley Heights 2015-12-06

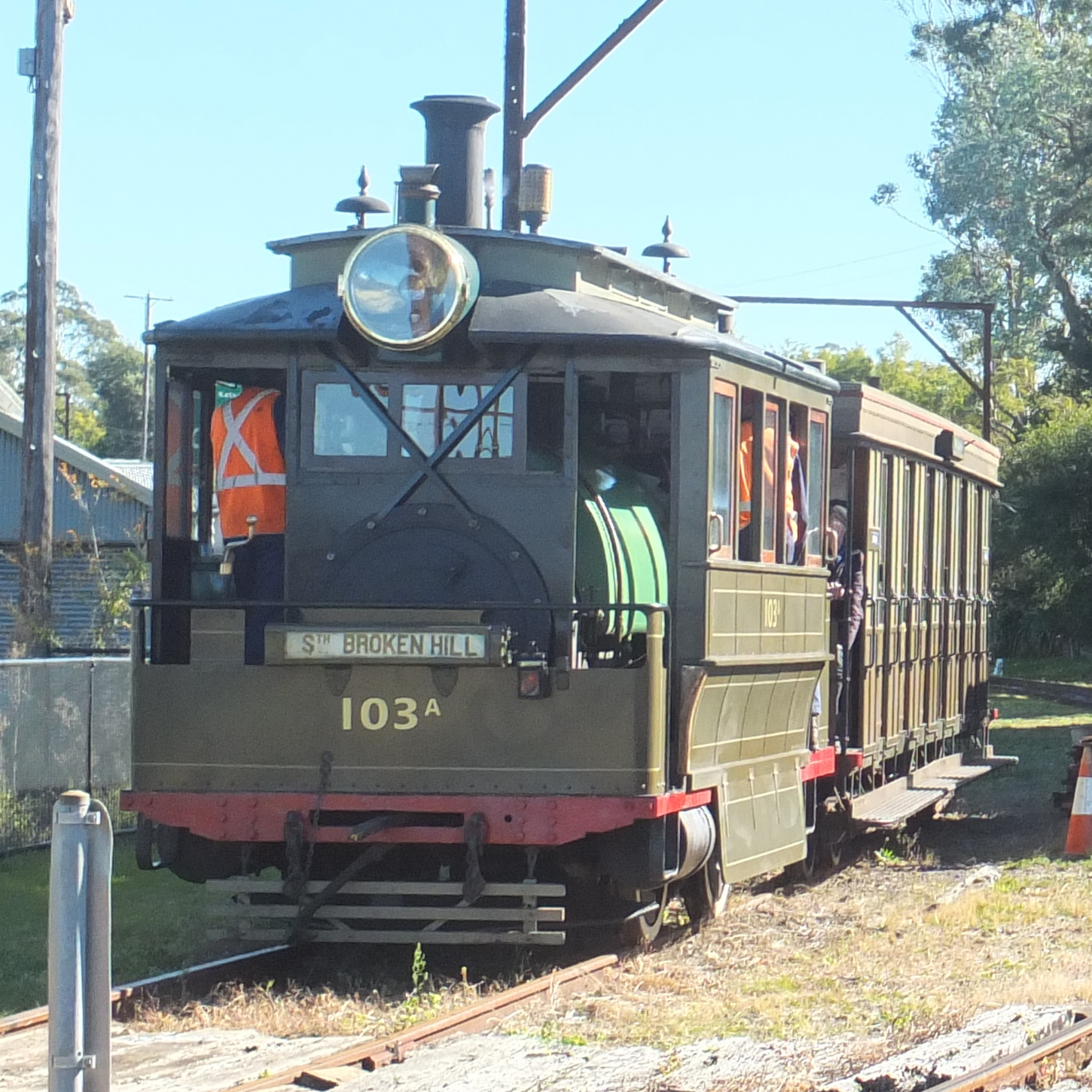
NSWGR Steam Tram and Trailer at Valley Heights 2023-07-08

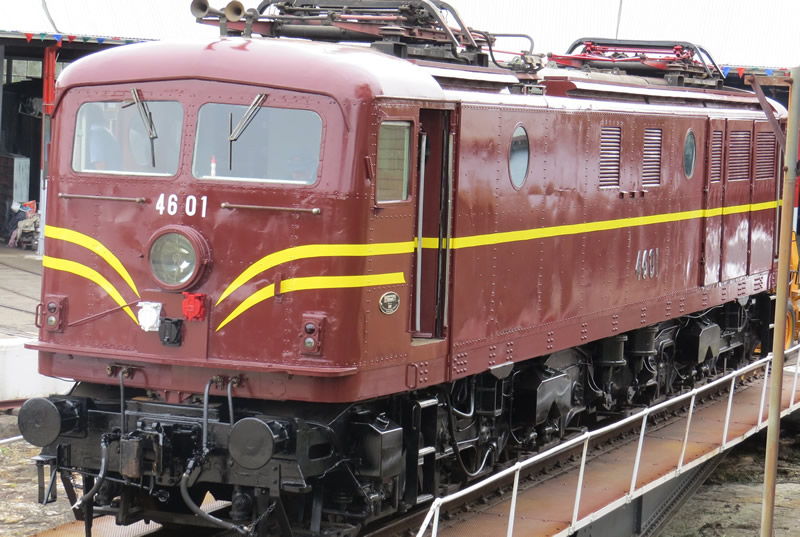
4601 on turntable at Valley Heights 2015-03-17

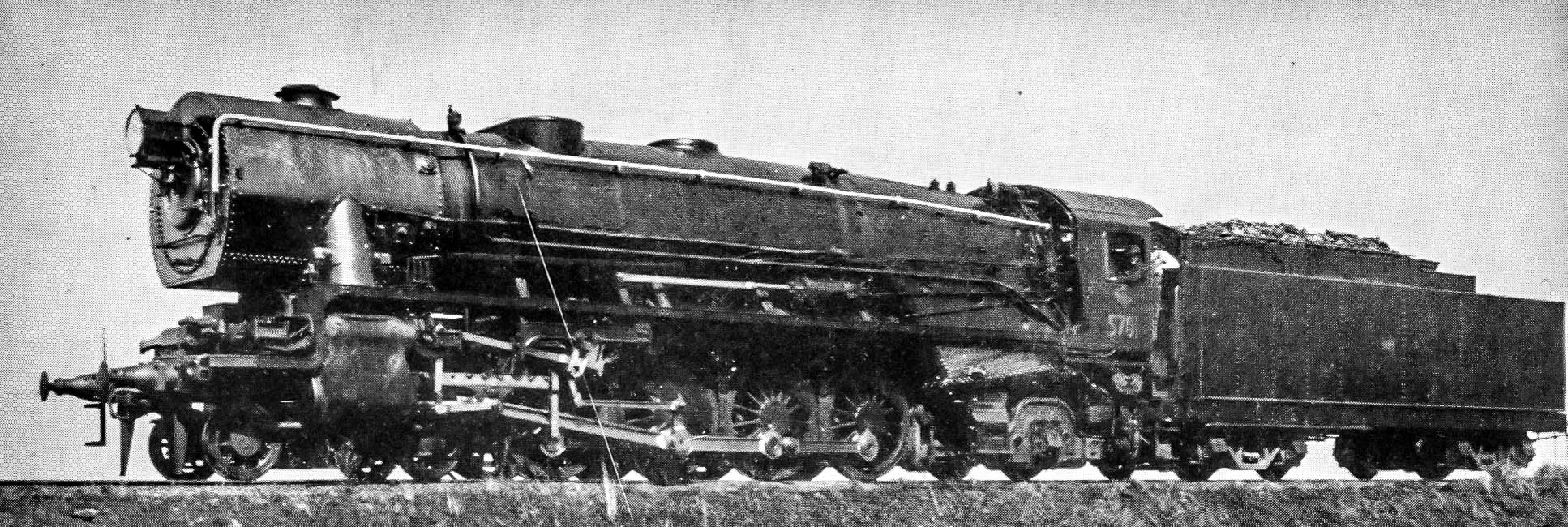
Locomotive 5711 under restoration at Valley Heights

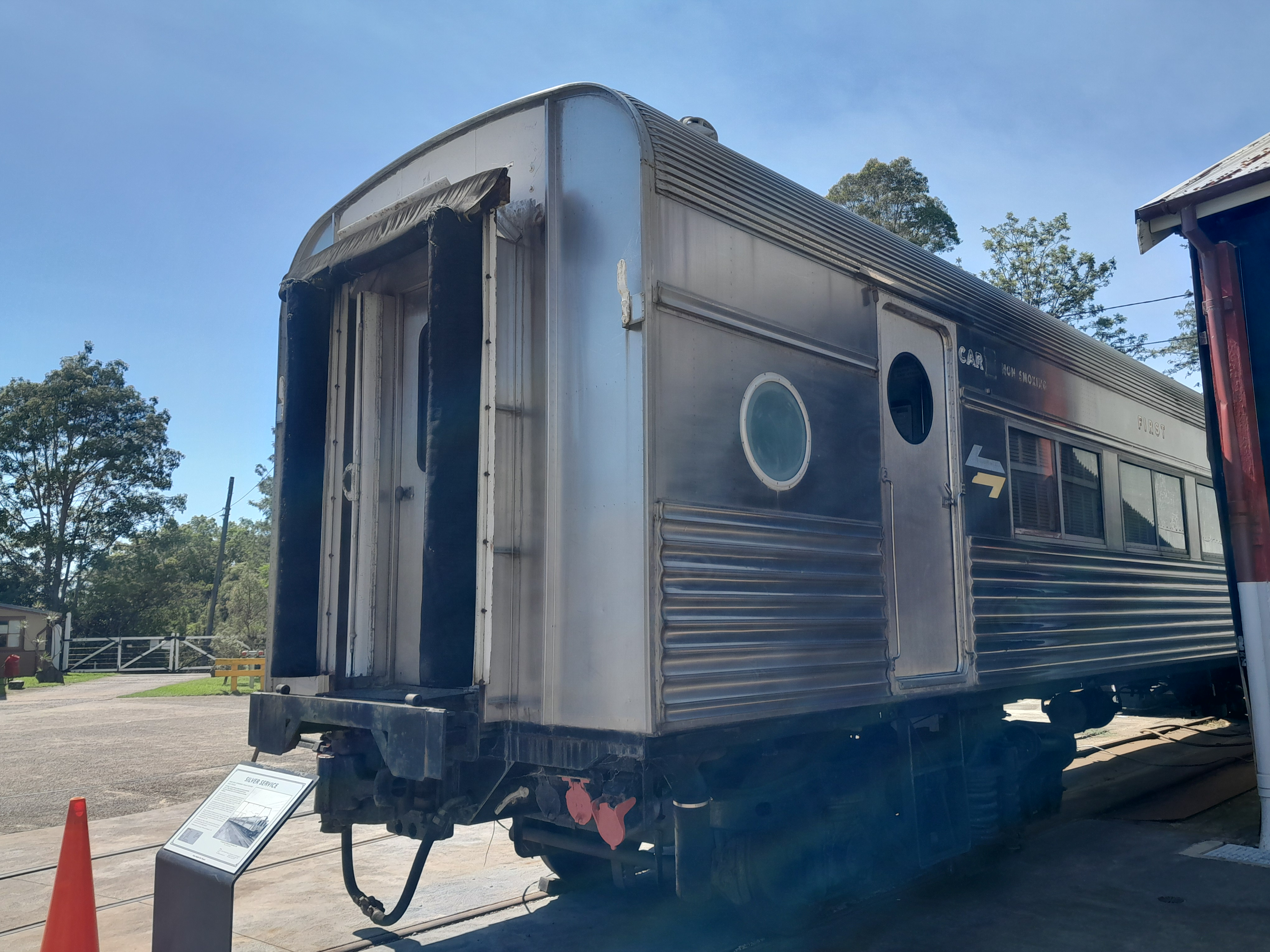
Interurban U set electric carriage ETB6039 on static display outside the depot
