= Granville rail disaster =

1977 train derailment in Australia

Coordinates: 33°49′54″S 151°00′37″E

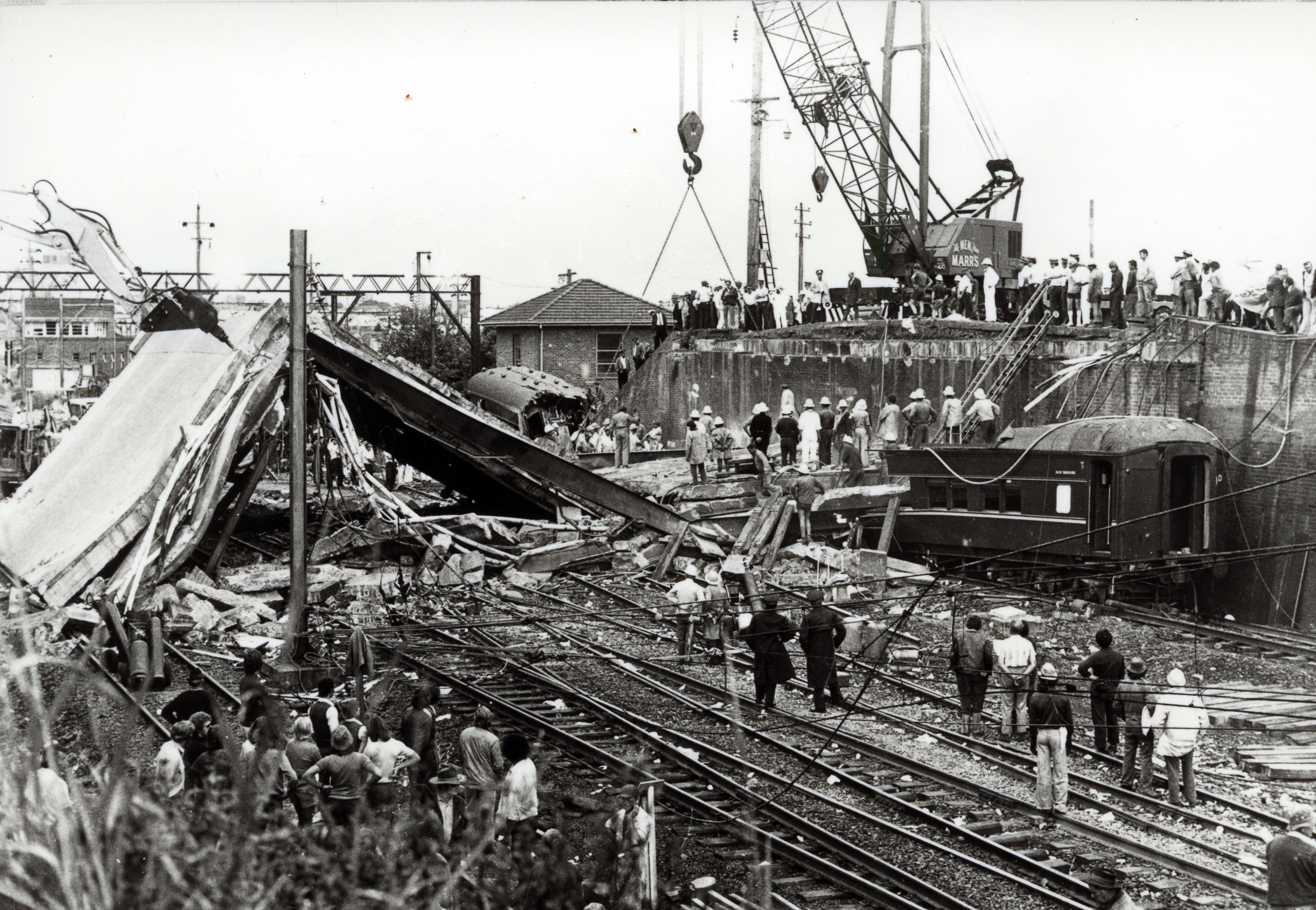
- Aftermath of the crash

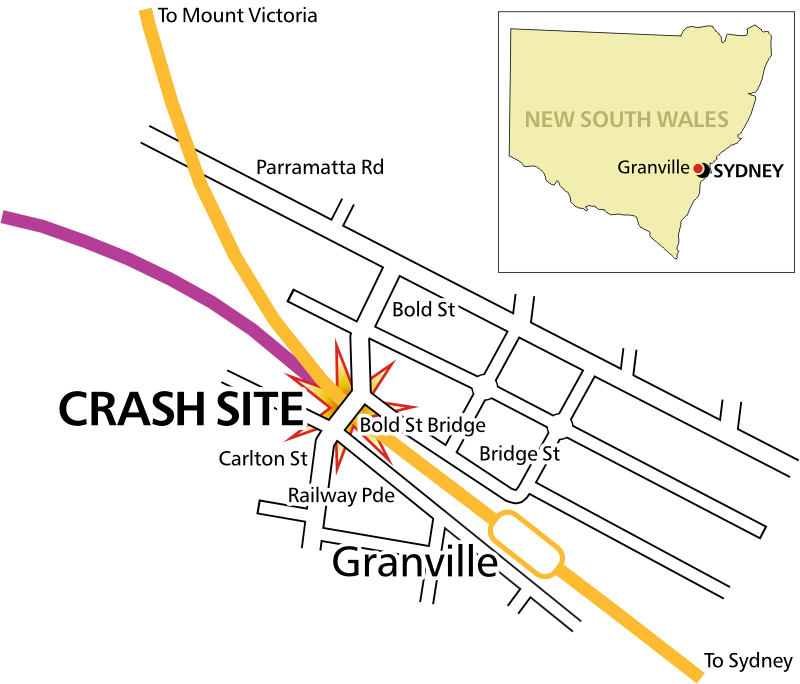

Details
- Date: 18 January 1977; 49 years ago 08:10
- Location: Granville, Sydney, New South Wales; 19.06 km (11.84 mi) WNW from Sydney
- Country: Australia
- Line: Main Western line
- Operator: Public Transport Commission
- Incident type: Derailment
- Cause: Poor track maintenance

Statistics
- Trains: 1
- Deaths: 84
- Injured: 213

On Tuesday, 18 January 1977 at Granville, a western suburb of Sydney, New South Wales, Australia, a crowded commuter train led by a 46 class locomotive derailed, running into the supports of a road bridge that collapsed onto two of the train's passenger carriages.

While the official inquiry found the primary cause of the crash to be poor fastening of the track, there were a number of factors that were identified as contributing to the accident.

It remains the deadliest rail disaster in Australian history; 83 people died and 213 were injured. An 84th victim, an unborn child, was added to the fatality list in 2017.

== Disaster ==
The train involved in the disaster consisted of eight wooden bodied Supplementary Interurban Passenger Carriages, which had been converted from country passenger stock by the PTC, hauled by 46 class electric locomotive 4620. It had commenced its journey towards Sydney from Mount Victoria in the Blue Mountains at 6:09 a.m.

At approximately 8:10 a.m. it was approaching Granville railway station when the locomotive derailed and struck one of the steel-and-concrete pillars supporting the bridge carrying Bold Street over the railway cutting.

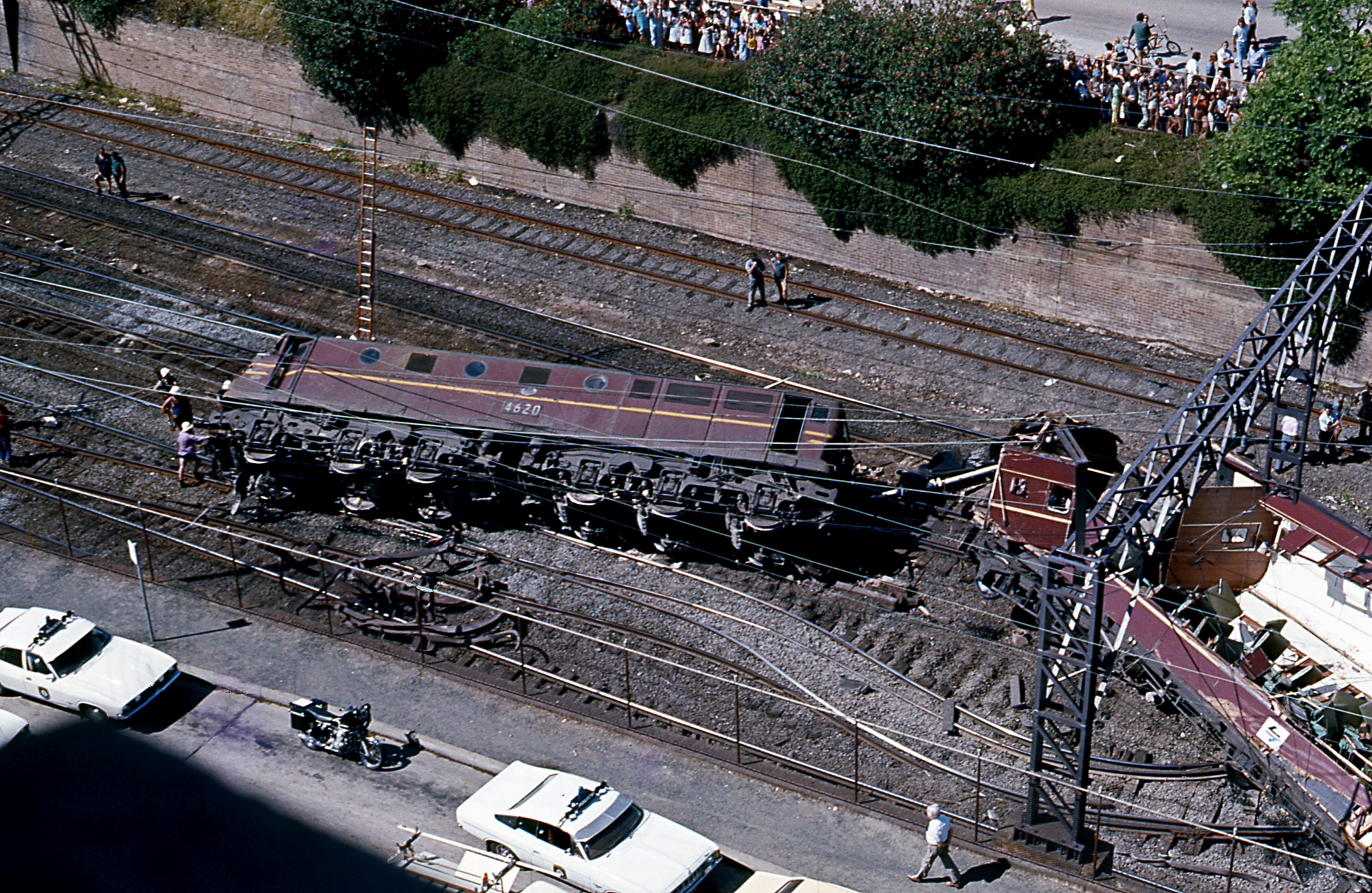
The overturned 4620 and the first carriage, the latter of which had its body split open in the derailment

The derailed engine and first two carriages passed the bridge, with the first carriage being separated free from the other carriages and torn open when it collided with a severed overhead stanchion from beside the track, killing eight passengers instantly.

The remaining carriages (cars 2 to 8) came to a halt with the second carriage clear of the bridge, and the rear half of the third carriage, along with the forward half of the fourth carriage, coming to rest under the weakened bridge, whose weight was estimated at 570 tonnes (560 long tons; 630 short tons). Carriages 5, 6, 7 and 8 were clear of the bridge at the Harris Park (or country side) of the bridge and were not harmed besides minor injuries and the shock of having been involved in the incident.

Within 15 seconds, with the majority of its supports demolished, the bridge including several motor cars that were driving across at the time, collapsed on top of the carriages, demolishing their wooden bodies and crushing the passengers inside.

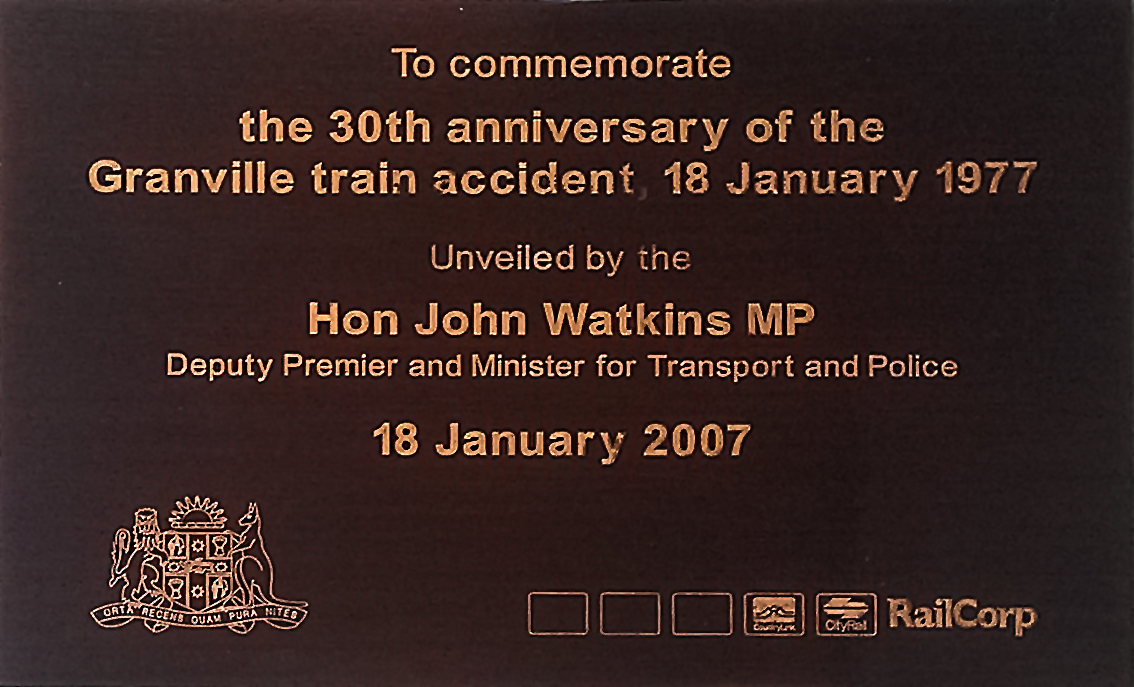
Memorial plaque commemorating the disaster at Granville station

Of the total number of passengers travelling in the third and fourth carriages, half were killed instantly when the bridge fell on them, crushing them in their seats, some to the point their heads and shoulders were below the level of their knees.

Of the 213 injured, several were trapped for many hours after the accident had occurred, with parts of the bridge, the carriage body and broken seating, or deceased passengers crushing them, hampering rescuers. Some of those trapped remained conscious and lucid, speaking to rescuers and recounting their experiences of the event, however, most of them died of crush syndrome soon after the weight was removed from their bodies.

Rescuers also faced the greater difficulty of the weight of the bridge, which was still crushing the affected carriages and reducing the available space in which they could work to rescue survivors. At one stage of the rescue, a declaration was made by those in charge that no further rescue attempts were to be permitted until the collapsed bridge had been lifted clear of the site. Soon after, the bridge settled a further 5 centimetres (2 in) onto the train, trapping two rescuers and crushing a portable generator "like butter".

Another major danger came from Liquid Petroleum Gas, as LPG cylinders were being kept year-round on board the train to be used in the winters for heating purposes.

Several of the deceased were overcome by the gas leaking from ruptured cylinders, reducing the amount of available breathable air in the area underneath the bridge. This leaking gas also prevented the immediate use of rescue tools such as petrol powered saws and cutting equipment, due to the risk of explosion. The NSW Fire Brigade provided enough ventilation equipment to dispel the gas, as well as a constant mist/film of water, sprayed over the accident site to mitigate the risk of the gas ignition.

Train driver Edward Olencewicz, assistant crewman Bill McCrossin (the "second man"), and the motorists (including one motorcyclist) driving on the fallen bridge all survived.

The operation lasted from 8:12 a.m. Tuesday until 6 a.m. Thursday. Ultimately, 83 people were killed in the crash.

== Aftermath ==
The Bold Street Bridge was rebuilt as a single span without any intermediate support piers, and other bridges similar to the destroyed bridge had their piers reinforced.

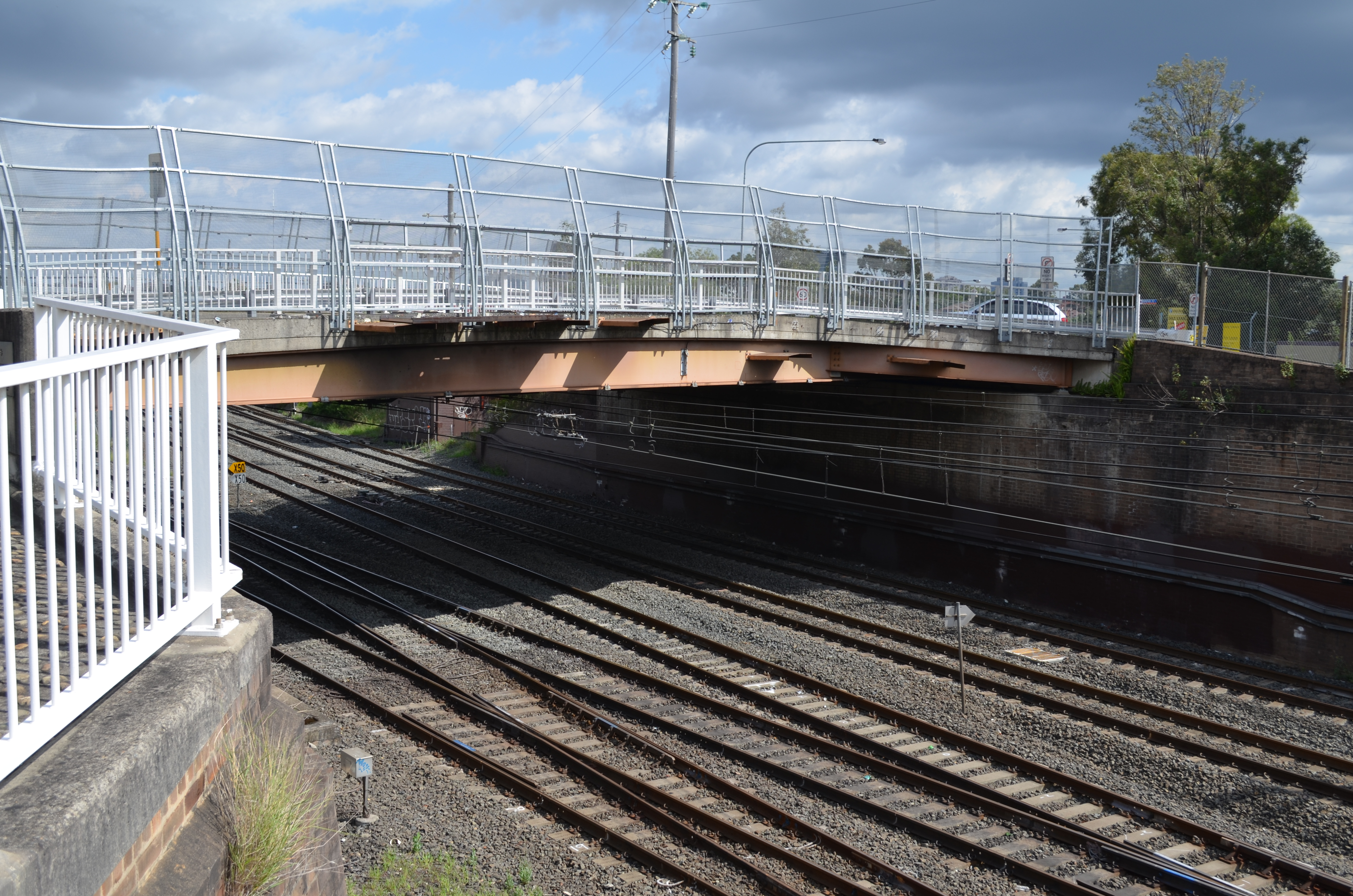
The replacement bridge

The original inquiry into the accident found that the primary cause of the crash was "the very unsatisfactory condition of the permanent way", being the poor fastening of the track, which has caused the track to spread and allowed the left front wheel of the locomotive to come off the rail.

Other contributing factors determined during investigation included the structure of the bridge itself, the condition of the track, and the condition of the locomotive.

When built, the base of the Bold Street Bridge had been found to be one metre lower than the road surface at each adjoining street. In order to bring the bridge road surface up to the same height as the street concrete was added on top to remove the difference. This addition added almost triple the weight of the originally designed bridge, a factor which contributed significantly to the destruction of the wooden train carriages.

It was found that the track immediately prior to the curve leading into the area of Bold Street Bridge had not been maintained correctly, leading to the locomotives' wheels to push the track out of gauge, which led the front right-hand wheel to leave the track, effectively derailing the locomotive.

Locomotive 4620 had been involved in a similar accident twelve years earlier, when it had derailed at Wentworth Falls in the Blue Mountains when operating a freight service. 4620 jumped the tracks as it entered the loop at the western end (country side) of Wentworth Falls platform, resulting in the entire train derailing. The cause was found to be an irregular operation of the train brake pipe. After being recovered from this accident, 4620 had the dents and scratches repaired and placed back into service.

The carriages involved were wooden bodied Supplementary Interurban Passenger Carriages, which had been converted from Country Passenger Stock by the PTC to Interurban Passenger stock. This was done by removing the previous internal arrangement of individual compartments and making the carriages an open plan similar to how passenger stock is today. This left the cars with only the side and end walls supporting the roof instead of a number of internal walls bearing the weight of the roof. It is entirely possible that if the cars had been left as built, with individual compartments, then whilst the collapse of the bridge would have crushed the carriages, the internal walls could have prevented the cars from being completely destroyed, enabling passenger to survive in pockets rather than simply being crushed.

The disaster prompted substantial increases in rail-maintenance expenditure, which had been experiencing a steady decline since the Second World War due to the reduction available of materials, finances, and labour forces. The Public Transport Commission of NSW after the accident immediately began a systematic overhaul of track maintenance in order to prevent another incident from occurring.

The train driver, Edward Olencewicz, was exonerated by the inquiry due to the exhaustive investigation into the incident.

Due to the Granville rail disaster and the number of victims who suffered from crush syndrome (a little understood medical condition at the time), a number of changes were made as to how crush injuries are dealt with by rescue personnel, not only at incidents such as this, but also for smaller rescues as well.

On 4 May 2017, New South Wales Premier Gladys Berejiklian apologised to the victims of the disaster, in Parliament House after extensive pushing for the apology.

=== Memorial ===
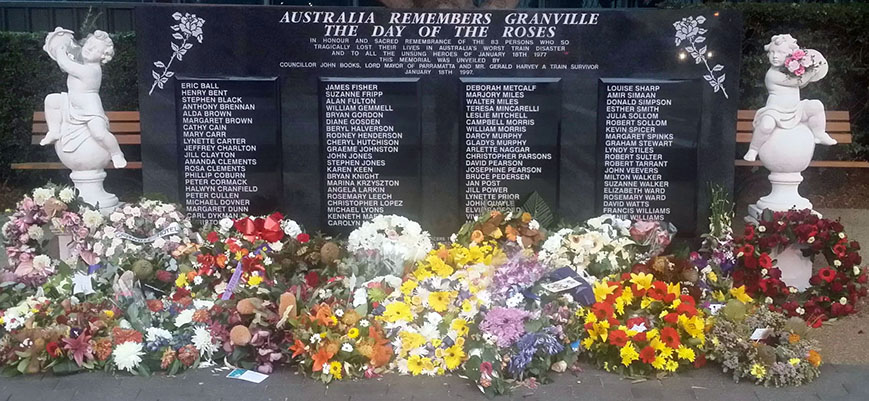
The Granville Train Disaster Memorial Wall

Families and friends of the victims and survivors gather with surviving members of the rescue crews annually. The ceremony ends with the throwing of 84 roses on to the tracks to mark the number of passengers killed. In 2007, a plaque was placed on the bridge to mark the efforts of railway workers who assisted in rescuing survivors from the train.

The original group, known as 'the trust', made submissions on rail safety issues, including recommending that fines for safety breaches be dedicated to rail safety improvements, and campaigning for the establishment of an independent railway safety ombudsman.

== Media ==
- A television docudrama, The Day of the Roses, was produced in 1998 about the accident.
- The Granville Train Disaster: 35 Years of Memories – a 2011 book by B. J. Gobbe, an emergency worker who attended the incident.
- A television documentary, The Train, produced by Graham McNeice from Shadow Productions was aired in 2012 on The History Channel Australia about the accident, and narrated by Brian Henderson.
- Revisiting the Granville Train Disaster of 1977 – a 2017 book by B. J. Gobbe.
- ABC's You Can't Ask That, series 4 episode 8 ("Disaster Survivors"), featured a victim from the accident who spoke about what happened and the long-term impacts on her life.

== See also ==
- Lewisham rail crash (United Kingdom)
- Eschede train disaster (Germany)
- Railway accidents in New South Wales
- Lists of rail accidents
