= Valley Heights railway gatehouse =

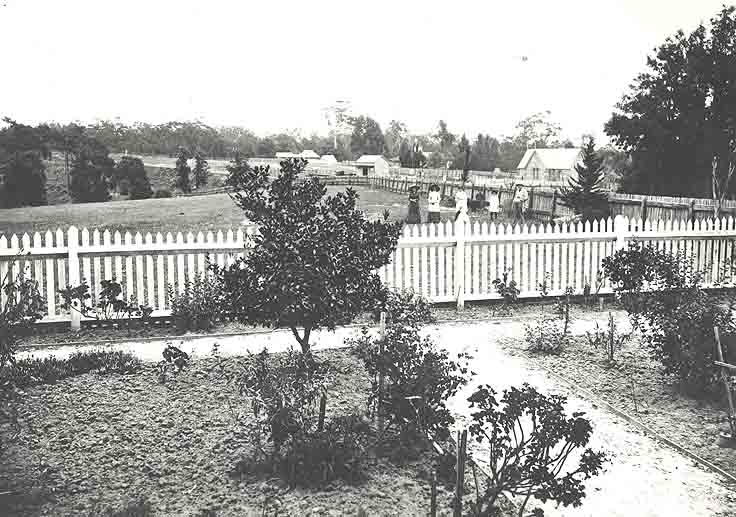
- The gatehouse, pictured c. 1878

- Location within New South Wales Location within Australia
- 33°42′44″S 150°35′23″E
- Location: 110 and 112 Green Parade, Valley Heights, City of Blue Mountains, New South Wales, Australia

History
- Built: 1867

Site notes
- Architectural style: Victorian Rustic Gothic

New South Wales Heritage Register
- Official name: Railway Gatehouse; Gatekeeper's Cottage
- Type: State heritage (built)
- Designated: 2 April 1999
- Reference no.: 220
- Type: Gatehouse
- Category: Transport - Rail

The Valley Heights railway gatehouse is a heritage-listed railway gatehouse located at 110 and 112 Green Parade, Valley Heights in the City of Blue Mountains local government area of New South Wales, Australia. It was built in 1867. It is also known as the Valley Heights Gatekeeper's Cottage. The property is privately owned. It was added to the New South Wales State Heritage Register on 2 April 1999.

== History ==
The 1867 sandstone cottage is one of twelve virtually identical constructed at the time of the western railway line expansion. The gatekeepers would close and re-open the gate over the railway line when trains were scheduled. Interestingly, there were two such crossings at Valley Heights plus one nearby at Springwood (still extant as part of a child care centre).

Because the railway shared a narrow ridge with existing road systems from the 1860s onwards, numerous level crossings were required. Twelve of these were guarded by gates controlled from a gatekeeper's cottage. Six of the original stone cottages of 1867 survive, but only four are habitable and on their original sites. The other surviving gatehouses are located at Lapstone, Springwood, Medlow Bath and Mount Victoria.

== Description ==
A single storey cottage with intersecting gables facing north to the railway line and set below the railway embankment. The main gable is on the east-west axis with the intersecting gable centrally located on the north side of the house. A skillion roof porch is on the west side of the north gable. A rear skillion roof is on the south side of the house.

The roof is of corrugated steel and the chimney is sandstone. The walls are random coursed sparrow-picked sandstone with rock-faced quoins at the openings and corners. The gables have slot vents. The front door is on the west side of the north wing, entered from the skillion porch. The windows are two over two-pane double hung, except the pair of narrow double hung windows in the north gabled front.

The south yard has a natural rock shelf. The garden features mature rhododendrons and liquidambars.

== Heritage listing ==
As at 15 February 2011, the Valley Heights railway gatehouse is one of only four surviving gatekeeper's cottages on its original site out of the twelve in the Blue Mountains. Architecturally, the sandstone building is designed in the Victorian Rustic Gothic style.

The Valley Heights railway gatehouse was listed on the New South Wales State Heritage Register on 2 April 1999.

== See also ==
- Valley Heights railway station
- Blue Mountains Line
