= Blue Mountains Grammar School =

Location
- Wentworth Falls & Valley Heights, New South Wales; Australia; 33°42′33″S 150°22′6″E; 33°42′12″S 150°34′49″E

Information
- Type: Independent comprehensive co-educational early learning, primary and secondary day school
- Motto: Latin: Per Ardua Ad Altiora (Through Effort To Higher Achievement)
- Denomination: Anglican
- Established: 1918; 108 years ago
- Chairman: Costa Zakis
- Principal: Steven Coote
- Years: Early learning and K–12
- Enrolment: 670
- Colours: Blue & gold
- Website: www.bmgs.nsw.edu.au

Blue Mountains Grammar School, abbreviated as BMGS, is a dual-campus independent Anglican comprehensive co-educational early learning, primary and secondary day school, located in the Blue Mountains suburbs of Wentworth Falls and Valley Heights, New South Wales, Australia. Established in 1918, there are approximately 600 students currently enrolled over both campuses.

== History ==
BMGS was founded in 1919 as Blue Mountains Church of England Boys Grammar School, in Springwood. It was a boarding school and the property was known as "Homedale", located near Homedale Street, Springwood. The Founding Headmaster was E.K. Deane and the first pastoral House formed in the School bears his name. Ken Deane's reasons for founding the school are uncertain, but it is believed that it was developed for the purpose of giving an education to children boarders in the central west and north west of the state. From this grounding Deane built the school into a multi-classroom premises in Springwood, which throughout the 1920s saw successes in student numbers and education initiatives.

By 1930, however, the school faced considerable hurdles to keep going. A decline in enrolments occurred between 1930 and 1934, such that membership numbers, approximately 55 in 1929, had declined to 24 in the second term of 1932, Deane struggled to keep the school alive, and in desperation lowered boarding fees to a pound a day, and making ends meet by growing his own food. By 1933 enrolments had grown to 45, but there was a backlog of debt that was built up from the school during that troublesome period.

During the war years, the number of enrolments at the school kept up, noting that most parents wanted to send their children out of the Sydney area. This period also meant the end of Ken Deane's career as headmaster of the school. His son, John Deane, succeeded him in 1945. John was confronted upon his arrival at the school with a burgeoning debt, as all of the schools assets had been laid in Ken Deane's name, with nothing in the bank. Another problem was the condition of the school grounds; with a loan from the Bank of New South Wales, John had the windows reglazed, repainted and re-roofed school buildings, forming a revitalised school grounds that helped attract new students.

The move of the school to its current grounds in Wentworth Falls came with the purchase of 'Coorah' in 1951. In May 1951 John Deane wrote a letter to parents stating that the operations of the school would no longer be conducted in Springwood, but at the new site of the school in Wentworth Falls. About 80 students were transferred from the Springwood campus to the Wentworth Fall site.

With a variety of dedicated benefactors, and the commitment of staff, students, and parents to the growth of the school, Blue Mountains Grammar School underwent a period of strategic growth between 1953 and 1960. Now under the leadership of Albert Pitt-Owen, it was promised that the school would be returned to sustainable enrolment numbers, but to do so required that Albert had the 'authority as well as responsibility'. 1953-1959 saw a significant period of development with land purchases, building, and a general rise in student numbers. In 1961, after the firm establishment of the Junior School, Albert Pitt-Owen signaled his intention to expand the establishment with a Senior school campus. In 1965 that Senior school moved from its initial location at 'Blue Horizons' to its current location at Coorah, Wentworth Falls.

The school now caters to approximately 501 students, and is presided over by the current Headmaster, Steven Coote.

== Controversy ==
In 2024 a former student lodged a statement of claim with the NSW supreme court alleging that she had been the victim of prolonged bullying which adversely impacted her 2022 HSC results. The school’s principal, Steven Coote, declined to comment on the case. stating “It is essential to prioritise the privacy and confidentiality of all parties involved, and so we are committed to engaging with the appropriate professionalism and sensitivity,”. The amount of the claim is stated to be for $600,000.

Vaping has also been an issue at the school though it has been bought under control since a student passed out in the boys toilet in 2022.

== Notable alumni ==
- Andrew Denton – comedian and television presenter
- Matt Drummond – Film Director and Emmy Award winner
- Ben St Lawrence – representative to the 2012 Olympics in Athletics
- Amanda Spratt – road cyclist and 2012 Summer Olympics athlete
- Lachlan Burgess – F1 in schools international competitor
- Josiah Ackman – 'Aura' farmer for Blue Mountains District

== See also ==
- List of non-government schools in New South Wales
