= New South Wales 46 class locomotive =

Class of New South Wales electric locomotive

New South Wales 46 class
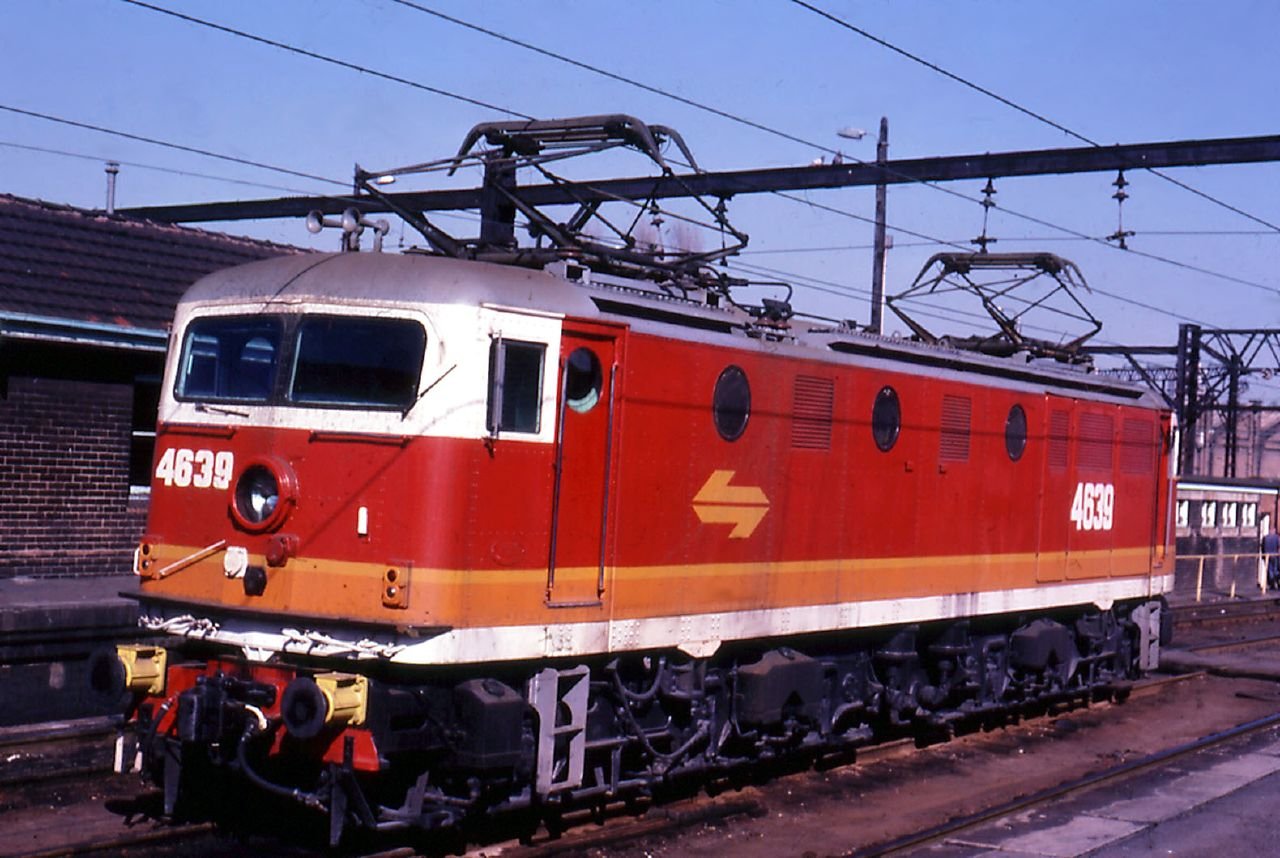
- 4639 at Central railway station in 1982
Type and origin
- Power type: Electric
- Builder: Metropolitan-Vickers/Beyer, Peacock & Company, Bowesfield Works, Stockton-on-Tees, England
- Serial number: 786-825
- Build date: 1956–1958
- Total produced: 40
Specifications
- Configuration
  - UIC: Co-Co
- Gauge: 1,435 mm (4 ft 8 1/2 in) standard gauge
- Wheel diameter: 45 in (1,143 mm)
- Wheelbase: 41 ft 0 in (12.5 m)
- Length: Over headstocks: 51 ft 2 in (15.60 m); Over coupler pulling faces: 53 ft 11 1/4 in (16.44 m)
- Width: 9 ft 7 in (2,921 mm)
- Height: Over stowed pantograph: 14 ft 6 in (4,420 mm)
- Axle load: 18 long tons 14 cwt (41,900 lb or 19 t)
- Loco weight: 112 long tons 0 cwt (250,900 lb or 113.8 t)
- Sandbox cap.: 18 ft^{3} (0.51 m^{3})
- Electric system/s: 1,500 V DC Overhead
- Current pickup: 2 pantographs
- Traction motors: 6 × Metropolitan-Vickers 272
Performance figures
- Maximum speed: 70 mph (113 km/h)
- Power output: Continuous: 3,400 hp (2,540 kW); One hour: 3,780 hp (2,820 kW)
- Tractive effort: Continuous: 36,700 lbf (163.25 kN); One hour: 40,800 lbf (181.49 kN) at 34.5 mph (55.5 km/h)
Career
- Operators: Department of Railways New South Wales; Public Transport Commission; State Rail Authority; FreightCorp
- Number in class: 40
- Numbers: 4601-4640
- First run: 25 June 1956
- Last run: 17 January 1996
- Preserved: 4601, 4602, 4615, 4627, 4638
- Disposition: 35 scrapped, 5 preserved

The 46 class was a type of mainline electric locomotive built by Metropolitan-Vickers and its partner Beyer, Peacock & Company in England for the Department of Railways New South Wales. They later operated for the Public Transport Commission, State Rail Authority and FreightCorp with most remaining in service into the 1990s.

== History ==
The locomotives were built at Bowesfield Works, Stockton-on-Tees, with electrical equipment supplied by Metropolitan-Vickers from its Trafford Park and Sheffield plants. Metropolitan-Vickers drew on experience gained from its earlier British Railways class 76 and 77 electric locomotives, which were used on the Woodhead Line in England and later in the Netherlands.

The locomotives were purchased as part of the electrification of the Main Western line over the Blue Mountains from Penrith to Bowenfels. The first was delivered in June 1956.

They hauled passenger services from Sydney Central and freight services from Rozelle and Enfield yards.

From January 1960 they also began to operate to Gosford following the electrification of the Main Northern line. This was later extended to Broadmeadow and Newcastle in June 1984.

From 1968 they hauled coal services from Glenlee Colliery on the Main South line and from January 1986 began to operate to Port Kembla following the Illawarra line being electrified.

From 1970 they hauled the Indian Pacific from Sydney Central to Lithgow. Because of the Commonwealth Railways stainless steel carriage stock having shorter than normal buffing plates, 4601-4604 had their buffers removed at one end to avoid buffer locking in 1970 with 4605-4608 similarly treated in 1974.

=== Demise and preservation ===
Their build quality and durability was such that 38 remained on the books in 1990. By April 1993, a number had been withdrawn and partially stripped with 31 in service or under repair. Following a decision by National Rail to use diesel locomotives on its services over the electrified network, the need for electric locomotives decreased. In December 1994, ten were sold for scrap. The remaining class members had been withdrawn by January 1996.

A few examples have survived into preservation with locomotives 4601 and 4638 owned by Transport Heritage NSW, 4615 and 4627 owned by the Sydney Electric Train Society (SETS) and 4602 owned by the Dorrigo Steam Railway and Museum. 4601 is located at the Valley Heights Rail Museum and 4638 is stored at the Chullora Heritage Hub.

4615 was purchased in 1998 and was previously at the Junee Roundhouse Railway Museum until it was moved from in 2015 via Parkes4627 was previously owned by the Hunter Valley Railway Trust, but it was purchased by SETS in 2013. Both were later transferred to Lithgow in June 2018 and July 2023 with the former planned for operational restoration while the latter is planned for static restoration.

== Accidents ==
The 46 class locomotives were involved in a number of serious incidents:

- On 16 July 1965, a 44-vehicle freight train hauled by 4620 (the locomotive involved in the Granville rail disaster) ran away for 4 miles (6.4 km), reaching speeds up to 95 miles per hour (153 km/h) downhill before a massive derailment at Wentworth Falls in the Blue Mountains. Investigations revealed that whilst the air brake train pipe was connected from the locomotive to the train, the associated isolating cock was left closed, rendering the train brakes inoperative.
- On 16 January 1976, a freight train hauled by 4622 collided with the rear of a stationary double deck interurban electric multiple unit train at Glenbrook, killing one passenger. This accident was caused by a wrong-side signal failure. The automatic signal behind the EMU displayed "caution" when it should have been at "danger", thereby admitting the following goods train into the occupied signal section.
- On 18 January 1977, 4620 was damaged in the Granville rail disaster, which claimed 84 lives. The locomotive was condemned and scrapped.

== Fleet Status ==
Number	Entered service	Withdrawn	Location	Status
4601	26/06/1956	14/04/1994	Valley Heights, NSW	Static Display
4602	19/07/1956	28/02/1994	Dorrigo, NSW	Stored
4603	10/09/1956	16/01/1996	-	Scrapped
4604	10/09/1956	16/01/1996	-	Scrapped
4605	28/09/1956	09/12/1993	-	Scrapped
4606	28/09/1956	15/01/1996	-	Scrapped
4607	19/10/1956	17/01/1996	-	Scrapped
4608	12/10/1956	17/01/1996	-	Scrapped
4609	19/10/1956	16/01/1996	-	Scrapped
4610	26/10/1956	15/01/1996	-	Scrapped
4611	19/11/1956	01/09/1995	-	Scrapped
4612	30/01/1957	15/01/1996	-	Scrapped
4613	27/12/1956	17/01/1996	-	Scrapped
4614	28/12/1956	19/01/1996	-	Scrapped
4615	21/01/1957	17/01/1996	Lithgow, NSW	Stored
4616	07/03/1957	?	-	Scrapped
4617	28/01/1957	04/03/1994	Junee, NSW	Stored (Cab only)
4618	04/03/1957	04/05/1989	-	Scrapped
4619	17/03/1957	13/04/1992	-	Scrapped
4620	27/03/1957	18/01/1977	-	Scrapped
4621	16/04/1957	16/01/1996	-	Scrapped
4622	08/04/1957	?	-	Scrapped
4623	01/05/1957	?	-	Scrapped
4624	21/05/1957	06/05/1994	-	Scrapped
4625	05/06/1957	?	-	Scrapped
4626	29/05/1957	17/01/1996	-	Scrapped
4627	09/05/1957	17/01/1996	Lithgow, NSW	Stored
4628	06/07/1957	29/11/1995	-	Scrapped
4629	20/07/1957	15/01/1996	-	Scrapped
4630	17/08/1957	22/11/1995	-	Scrapped
4631	21/10/1957	19/04/1990	-	Scrapped
4632	02/11/1957	07/11/1990	-	Scrapped
4633	9/11/1957	07/11/1990	-	Scrapped
4634	13/01/1958	05/09/1990	-	Scrapped
4635	03/04/1958	12/02/1991	-	Scrapped
4636	09/05/1958	08/02/1994	-	Scrapped
4637	20/06/1958	12/02/1991	-	Scrapped
4638	?	16/01/1996	Chullora, NSW	Stored
4639	05/12/1958	15/01/1996	-	Scrapped
4640	19/12/1958	18/10/1990	-	Scrapped
