= Springwood railway station =

Railway station in New South Wales, Australia

Springwood
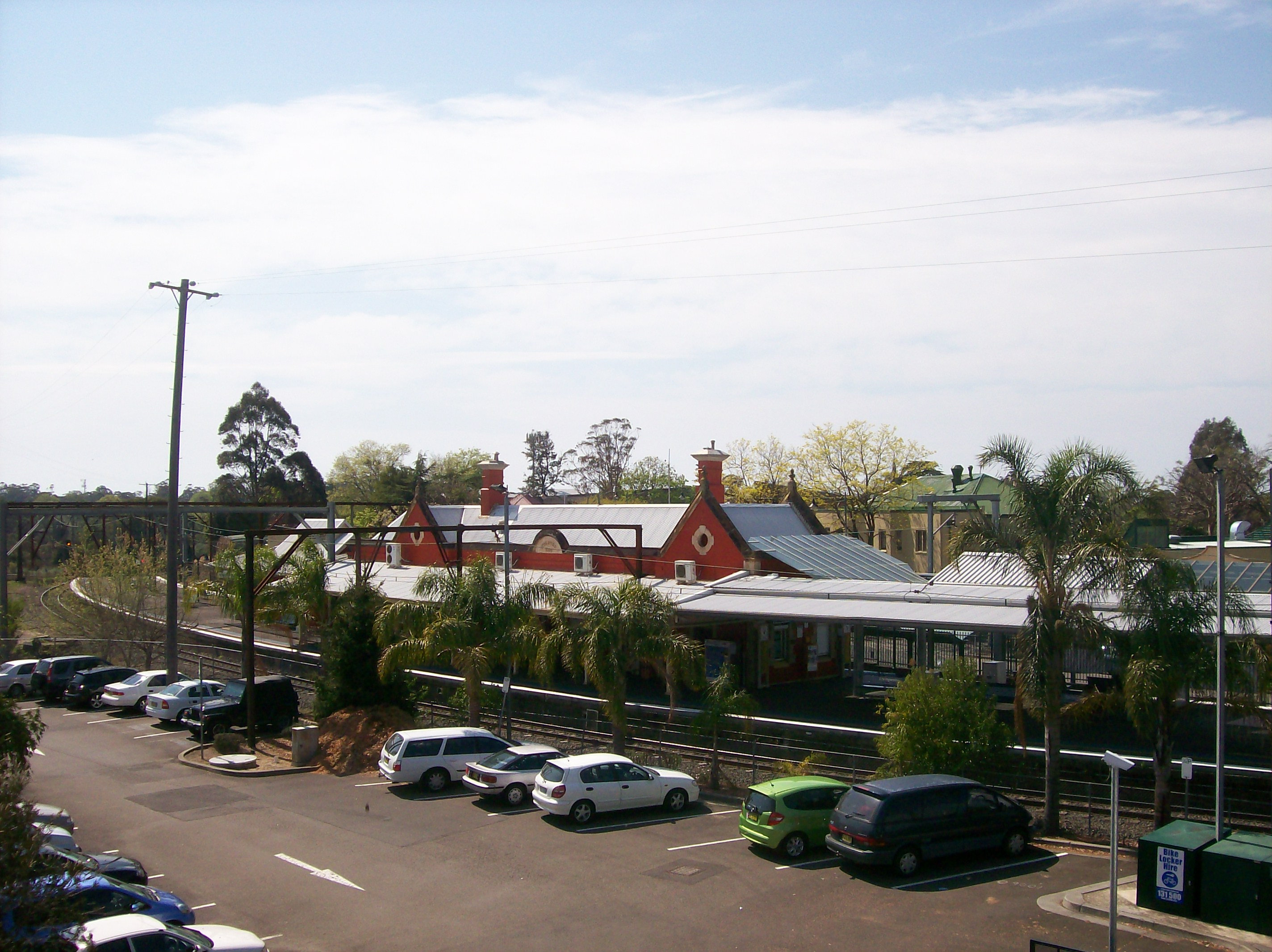
- Eastbound view from carpark looking at station platform and building, September 2012

General information
- Location: Jerseywold Avenue, Springwood; Australia
- Coordinates: 33°41′56″S 150°33′50″E
- Elevation: 368 metres (1,207 ft)
- Owner: Transport Asset Manager of New South Wales
- Operator: Sydney Trains
- Line: Main Western
- Distance: 79.67 km (49.50 mi) from Central
- Platforms: 2 (1 island)
- Tracks: 2
- Connections: Bus

Construction
- Structure type: Ground
- Accessible: Yes
- Architect: John Whitton
- Architectural style: Victorian Carpenter Gothic

Other information
- Status: Staffed
- Station code: SPR
- Website: Transport for NSW

History
- Opened: 11 July 1867
- Electrified: 23 October 1956

Passengers
- 2025: 448,919 (year); 1,230 (daily) (Sydney Trains)

Services
Preceding station	Intercity Trains	Following station
Faulconbridge towards Lithgow	Blue Mountains Line	Valley Heights towards Central
Hazelbrook towards Lithgow	Blue Mountains Line Limited express	Blaxland towards Central
Katoomba towards Bathurst	Blue Mountains Line (twice daily) Bathurst Bullet	Penrith towards Central

New South Wales Heritage Register
- Official name: Springwood Railway Station Group
- Type: State heritage (built)
- Designated: 2 April 1999
- Reference no.: 1247
- Type: Railway Platform / Station
- Category: Transport – Rail
- Builders: John White, Chas. & Wm. Coghill & Thos. Proull
Location

Springwood railway station is a heritage-listed former railway bridge and now railway station located on the Main Western line in Springwood, City of Blue Mountains, New South Wales, Australia. It was designed by NSW Government Railways and built from 1883 to 1884 by John White, Chas. & Wm. Coghill & Thos. Proull. It is also known as Springwood Railway Station Group. The property was added to the New South Wales State Heritage Register on 2 April 1999. The station opened on 11 July 1867. It previously had a passing loop to the east of Platform 1.

== History ==
When the first railway line over the Blue Mountains was constructed in 1867 under the direction of John Whitton, a station at Springwood was opened. This location has been an important railway station for over 140 years, with several trains to and from Sydney starting and terminating here. The present brick main station building was constructed in 1884, at the same time as stations were built at Wentworth Falls and Lawson.

In the 1880s, the Blue Mountains started to become a popular holiday destination and this was reflected in the provision of new, brick platform structures to replace the initial timber buildings. Springwood received in 1886 the finest building on the Blue Mountains, apart from Mount Victoria. It was also a rare example of local, official involvement in the building design, with the District Engineer, Fred Avery, approving the architectural details.

A gate keepers cottage was located west of the station building (now privately owned) and is not part of this listing. Bathurst Road crossed the railway line on the western side of the station and the resident gatekeeper was responsible for manning the gates at the level crossing. A footbridge provided pedestrian access across the line. With only one line across the mountains at this stage, the station building faced north to the line and to the crossing loops that were then in place on the north side of the main line.

The railway line over the Blue Mountains was duplicated in 1902 necessitating alterations to most of the platforms on that line. In most cases a new station was built, but in the case of Springwood Railway Station, a new platform wall was built on the south side of the main station building and alterations to the main station building were undertaken to provide a shelter on that side of the station. This was probably when the building was also extended one bay to the east. The level crossing was replaced by a subway and the residence to the west of the railway station was removed to make way for the footbridge which provided access from the north and south sides of the station to the platform. A men's toilet block was built to the east of the main station building. It is not clear whether the footbridge was a modification of the earlier footbridge or a new construction.

A signal box was opened in 1935 within the building envelope. In 1995 the room in which the interlocking frame is situated was changed.

From the 1940s onward, Springwood was an important watering station for steam locomotives proceeding to Sydney. Whilst taking on water there, however, it was extremely difficult for locomotives to be positioned in the necessarily precise location because of the falling gradient.

Few changes were made to the station between 1902 and 1997. In 1998, station upgrading works were undertaken including the construction of a subway to provide pedestrian access from the north and south to the platform, replacing the 1902 footbridge, a lift between the subway and the main station building, and a new canopy over the west end of the platform to provide shelter to the subway and platform.

Pedestrian access to the station is via a staircase, or elevator for the disabled, that connects to an underpass tunnel that connects to Macquarie Road to the south-east, and the station's multi-story parking structure to the north-west. The underpass is a relatively recent modification to the station, added in the late 1990s. Previously, station access was via an overpass bridge that likewise doubled as both access to the station and as a rail crossing.

== Platforms and services ==
Springwood has one island platform with two sides. It is serviced by Sydney Trains Blue Mountains Line services travelling from Sydney Central to Lithgow with 2 evening services to Bathurst. Some services from Sydney terminate at Springwood. One late night westbound service each day departs from platform 1, in order to perform a points cleaning move, which ensures both sets of points near the station are in working order.

Platform	Line	Stopping pattern	Notes
1	Blue Mountains Line	services to Sydney Central	
2	Blue Mountains Line	services to Katoomba, Mount Victoria & Lithgow; 2 evening services to Bathurst	Pick up only
2	Blue Mountains Line	terminating services, returning to Sydney Central	

== Description ==
The complex includes a type 3 second-class station building, built in 1884; with a signal box, completed in 1935; and a brick lavatory building (male toilet), completed in 1944. Other structures include a face brick island platform, completed in 1884 and 1902; and a pedestrian subway, completed in 1997–8.

=== Station building ===
External: Constructed (1884) of face brick with corrugated steel roof which extends on both sides to form an awning over both platforms. The Springwood station building is an early second class single storey island building in the Victorian Carpenter Gothic style. The extension at the east end of the building, breaking the symmetry, has a hipped roof behind the parapet. Two chimneys on the ridgeline of the main roof are rendered with wide rendered and moulded corbels. The existing chimney pots are not original. The walls of the original building are Flemish bond tuckpointed brickwork with sandstone capping to the parapets and sandstone quoins to the external corners and reveals to openings. An arch on the centre of the original parapets has a stone infill carved with "ERECTED 1884". Sandstone finials top the gables and bull's-eye vents in the gables are edged with sandstone. The east extension of the building is in stretcher bond brickwork but is finished with sandstone detailing matching the original construction. The brickwork has been painted. The building has three panelled doors with fanlights and dentilated transoms. Doors to the centre of the building are similar but have two panels. Windows are double hung and finished with sandstone label moulds. The original wide awning on the north side of the building is supported on timber stop chamfered columns with capitals and pattern carved on the centre of the columns. Cast iron brackets provide further embellishment to the columns. Awnings on the south side of the building are typical of the 1902 railway stations in the Blue Mountains with a wide low pitched roof supported on steel brackets supported on stone corbels. The ends of both awnings are finished with a timber boarded valance. A train mural by artist Vernon Treweeke is located on the eastern side of the main station building covering the privacy wall to the male toilet. Other murals by the same artist are located at Katoomba and Woodford Railway Stations.

Internal: The building appears to have maintained few of its original detailing and finishes due to the upgrade works of 1997–98. However, the original floor layout including a waiting room, ticket office, parcels office and signal box and ladies room are still present in addition to early double panelled timber framed windows and timber doors. Light fittings and carpet finish are relatively new. The 1902 extension to the southern side of the building is clearly apparent forming a corridor along the building. The 1935 signal box within the station building's envelope survives with its signage and no longer operates (lever frame and CTC panel removed). It is currently a storage room with exposed roof structure and painted brick walls.

=== Lavatory building ===
External: A simple gabled building (1944, 1998) on axis with the platform with a clearstory ventilated roof. The roof is of corrugated steel with exposed purlins to the gable ends and exposed rafters. The walls are Flemish bond tuckpointed brick work. Entry is at east end through an arched door behind a brick screen with the Mural on the outer side. Windows in the north wall have stone sills.

Internal: All toilet and light fittings date to 1998 upgrade works with painted brick walls and fibrocement ceiling panels.

=== Island platform ===
Springwood Railway Station has an island platform (1902) in a curved shape towards the east. The platform is brick faced with concrete deck and asphalt finish. A small square portion of grass has been inlayed into the platform surrounded by concrete west of the lavatories. A few potted plants are located on the north side of the platform under the station building awning, near the booking office and either side of the station level lift entrance. No garden beds are present. Entrance to the subway is located at the east end of the platform between the lift and station building. Period and modern light fittings and timber bench seating in addition to modern and early signage, aluminium palisade fencing between the station building and the lavatories and at both ends of the platform.

=== Pedestrian subway ===
The pedestrian subway (1997–1998) is marked by a long gabled corrugated roof on the Macquarie Road footpath and a low pitched gabled roof over the west end of the platform with cantilevered awnings connected to the awnings of the main station building. The walkway is most prominent from the western Macquarie Road approaches to the station than from the more eastern approaches. Access to the platform is via a ramped access way from both sides of the subway towards a central stairway on the west side of the subway and a lift at the east wall. The internal walls of the subway are tiled from floor to ceiling. The station is a prominent element in the Macquarie Road streetscape, overlooking a bend in the road making it a local landmark.

=== Moveable items ===
- A Milners' Patent safe (no number) has been observed at the station office.
- Several original station signage depicting " Station Master", "Waiting Room", "Booking Office", "Parcels Office", "Signal Box" etc.
- 2 x commemorative plaques (1984 & 1998) on Platform 1 elevation of the station building.
- Early light fittings on platform

=== Landscape features ===
A brick 1902 retaining wall runs along the edge of the Macquarie Road footpath, elevating the railway line and platform from the street.

=== Condition ===
As at 10 September 2008, the station building was generally in good condition. Also in good condition were the lavatory building, the island platform and the pedestrian Subway. The station group has a high degree of integrity with minimal changes to the exterior of the buildings. The overall integrity of the station has been reduced due to the 1990s upgrade works, which obscure views to the roofscape of the building and impact on the setting.

=== Modifications and dates ===
- 1902 – Extension to the southern side of the building and the platform during duplication of the line
- 1944 – Extension to the main station building at Sydney end
- 1997–98 – Pedestrian Subway with lift and modern canopies constructed

=== Further information ===
Small fibro shed adjacent to yard is excluded from listing.

== Transport links ==
Blue Mountains Transit operates 10 bus routes via Springwood station, under contract to Transport for NSW:

- 685H: to Hazelbrook
- 690C: to Champman Parade
- 690P: Faulconbridge to Penrith station
- 690K: to Katoomba
- 692W: to Winmalee
- 692B: to Springwood Hospital
- 692H: to Hawkesbury Heights
- 692Y: to Yellow Rock
- 693: to Burns Road
- 694: to Bee Farm Road

== Gallery ==
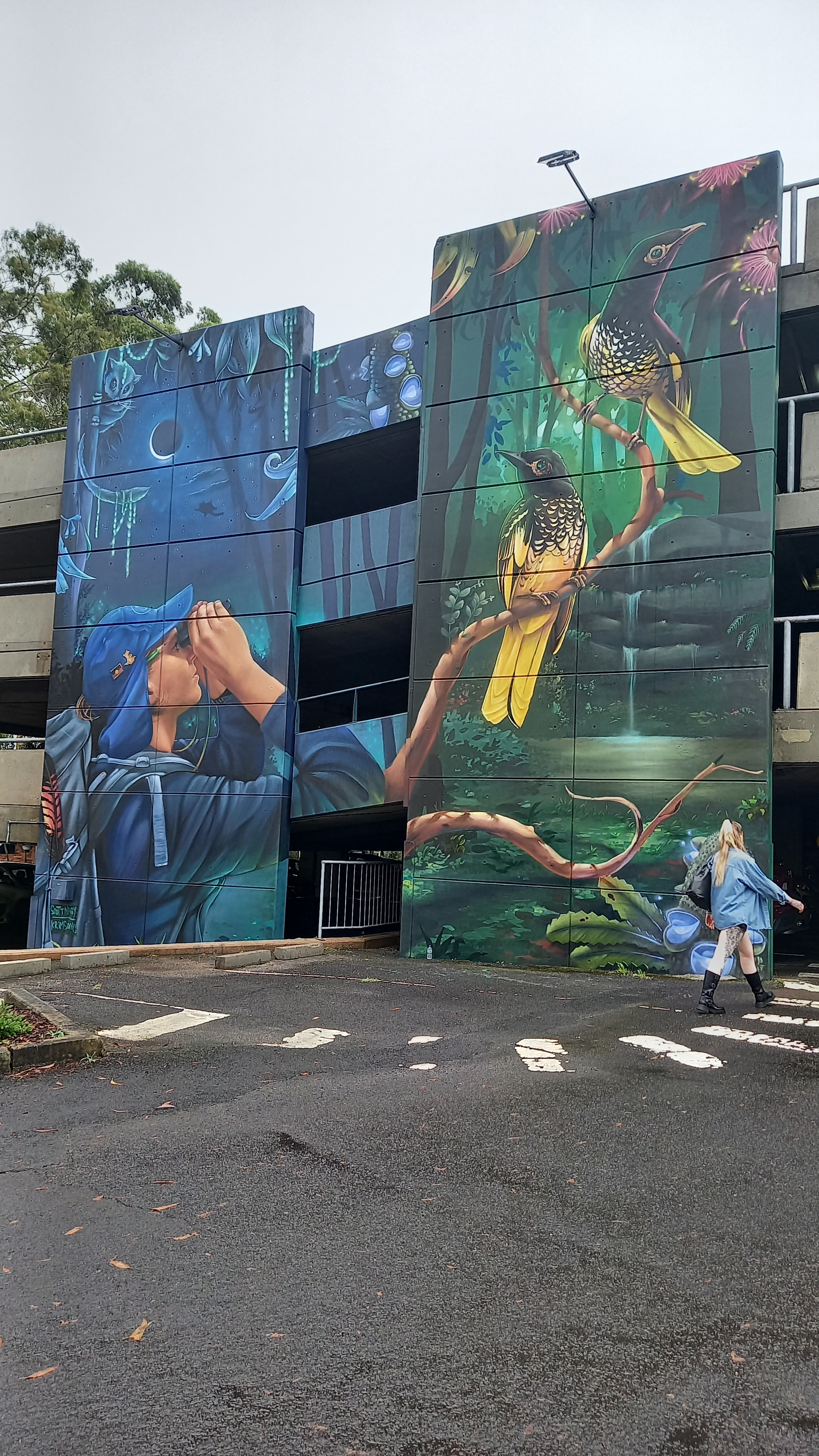
Springwood railway station carpark west end mural 2024

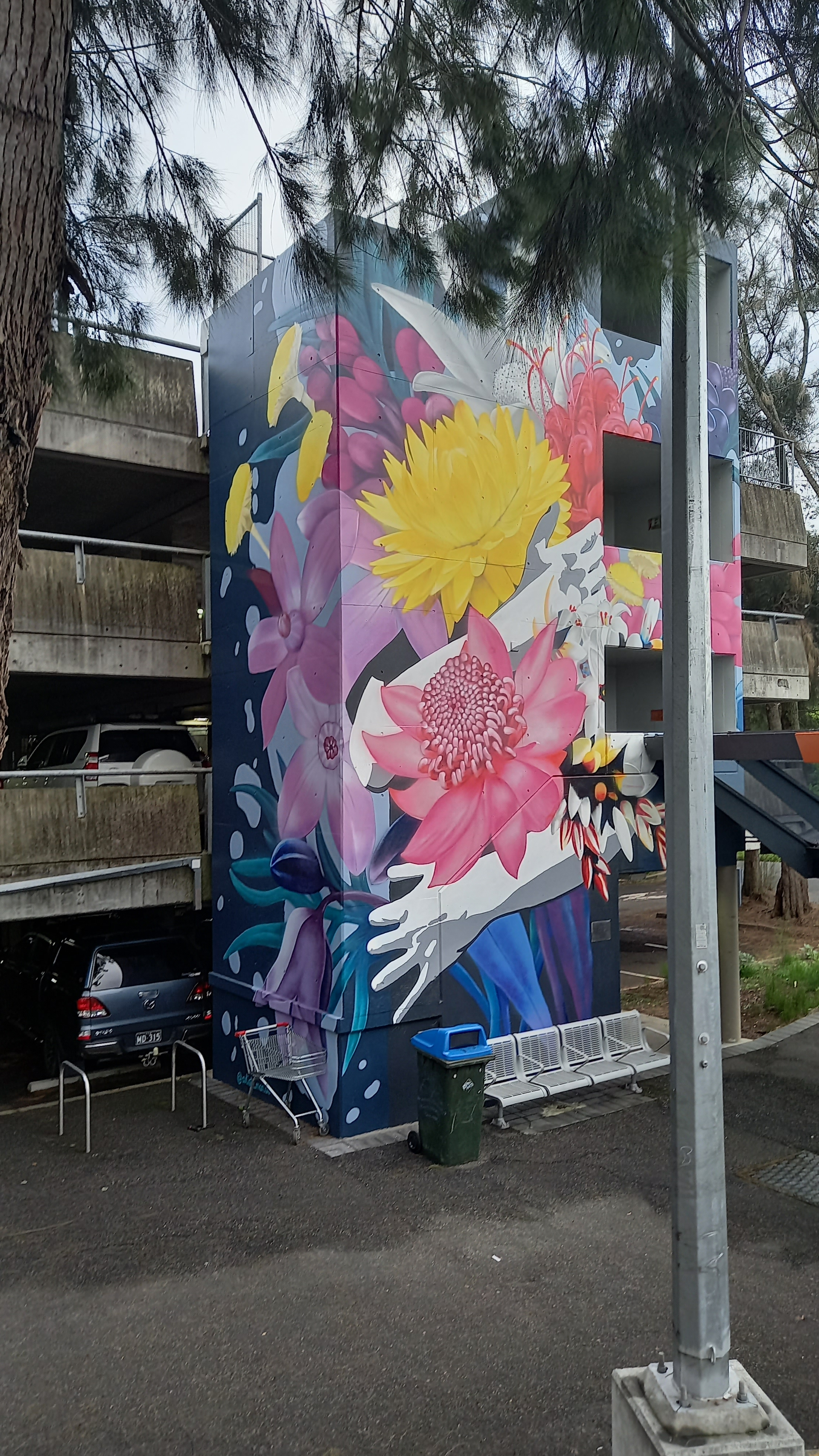
Springwood railway station carpark east end stair case mural 2024

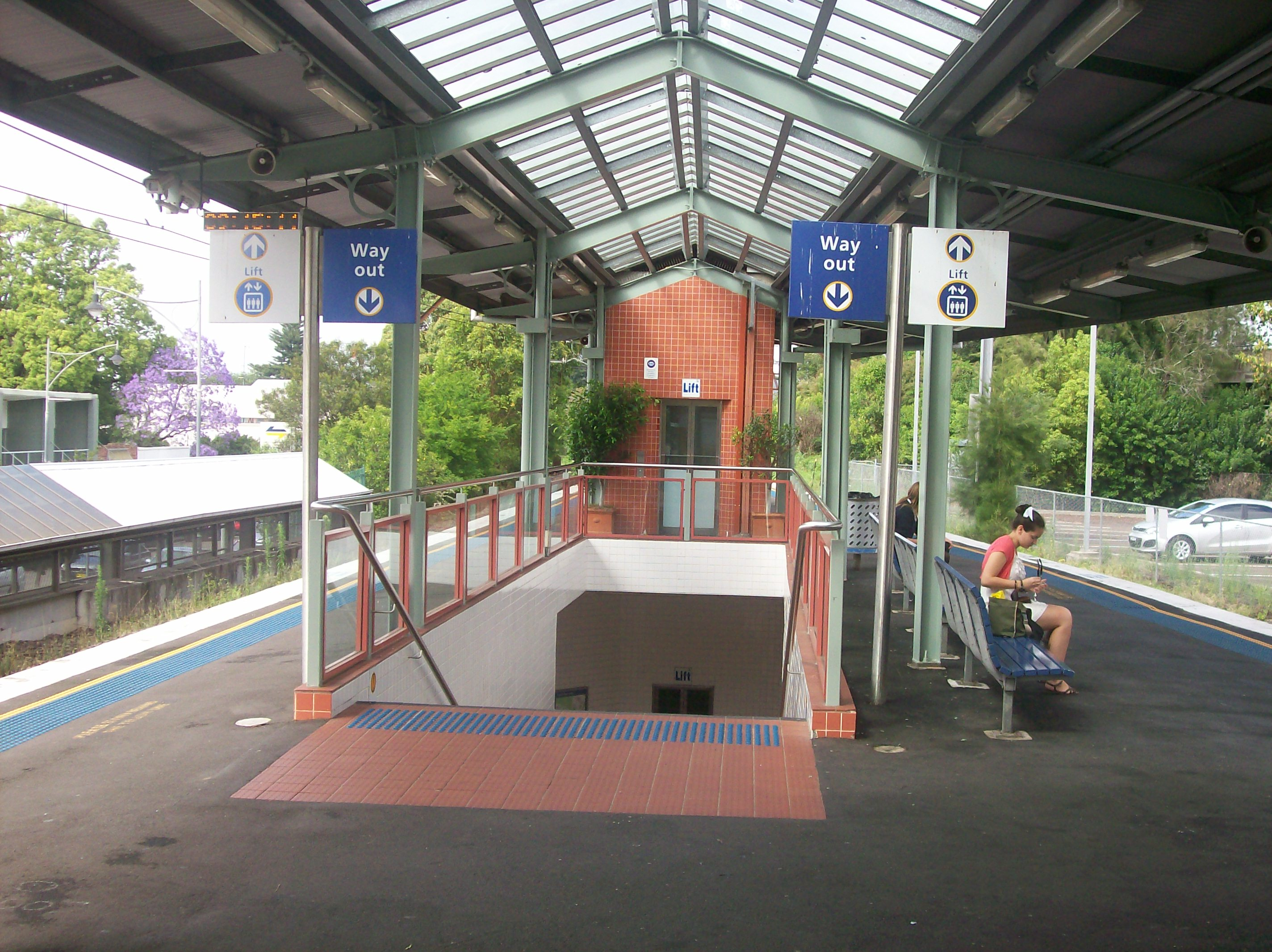
Springwood railway station exit 2011

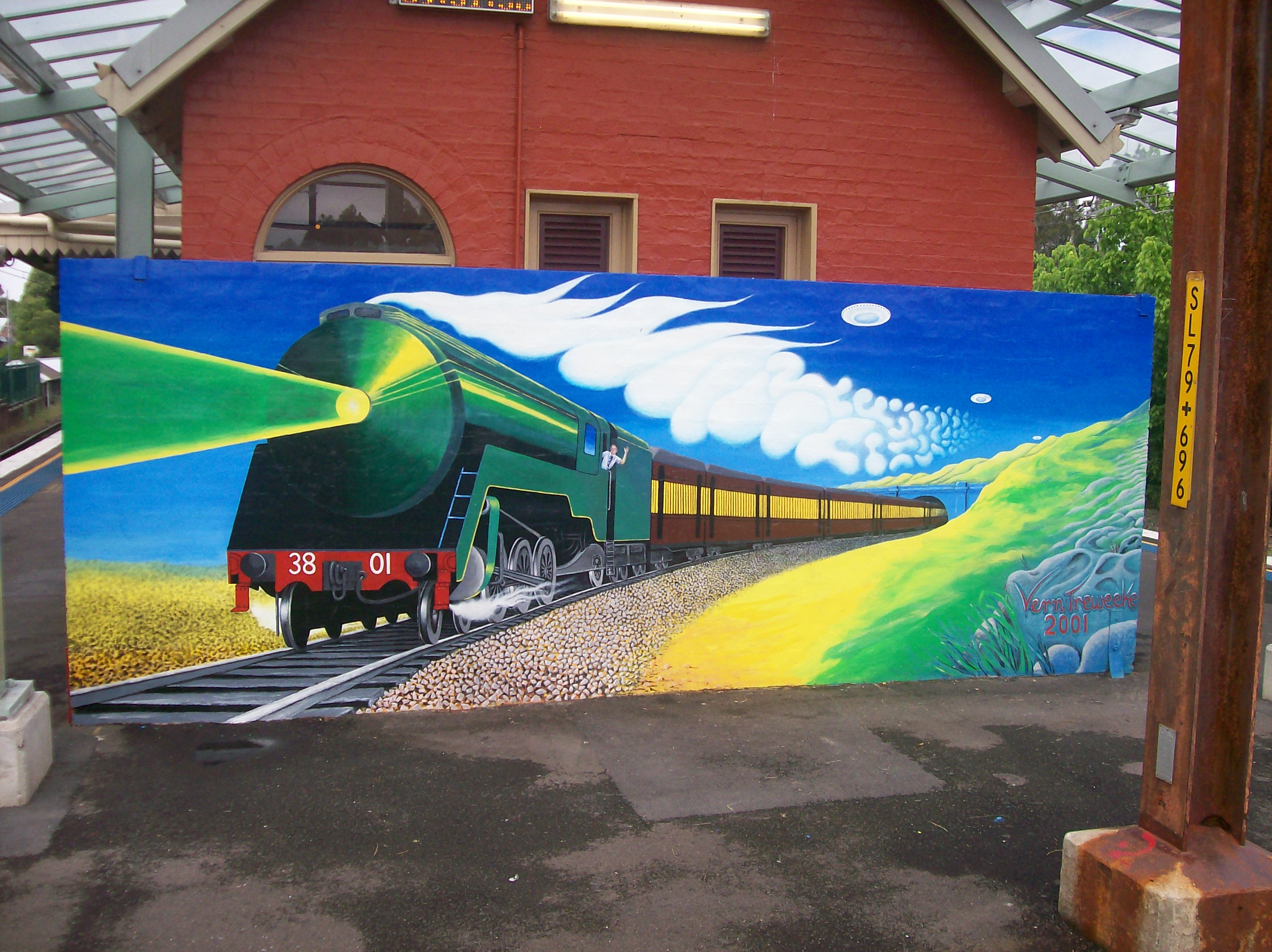
Springwood railway station mural 2011 (painted by Vernon Treweeke

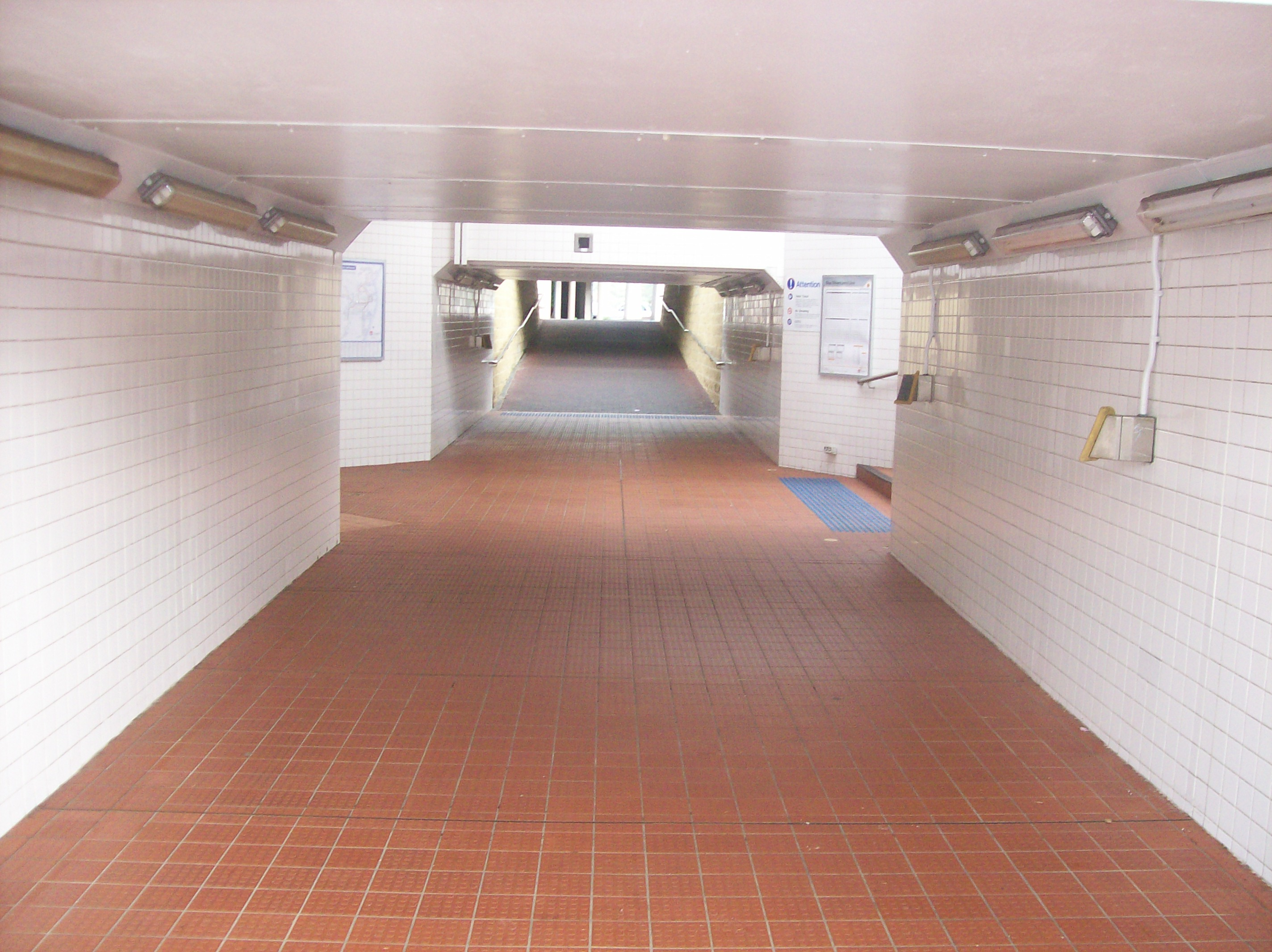
Springwood railway station tunnel 2011

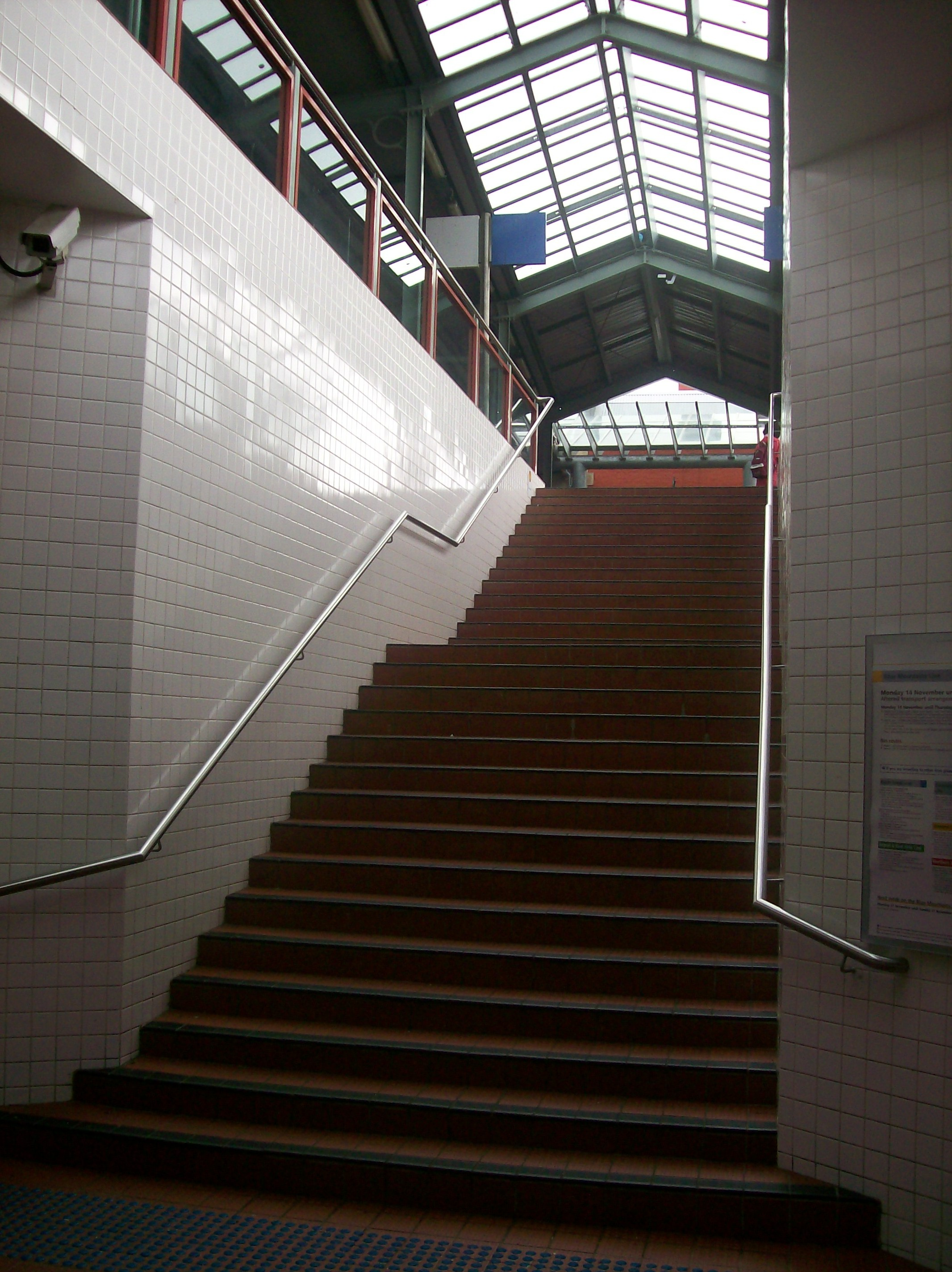
Springwood railway station stairs 2011

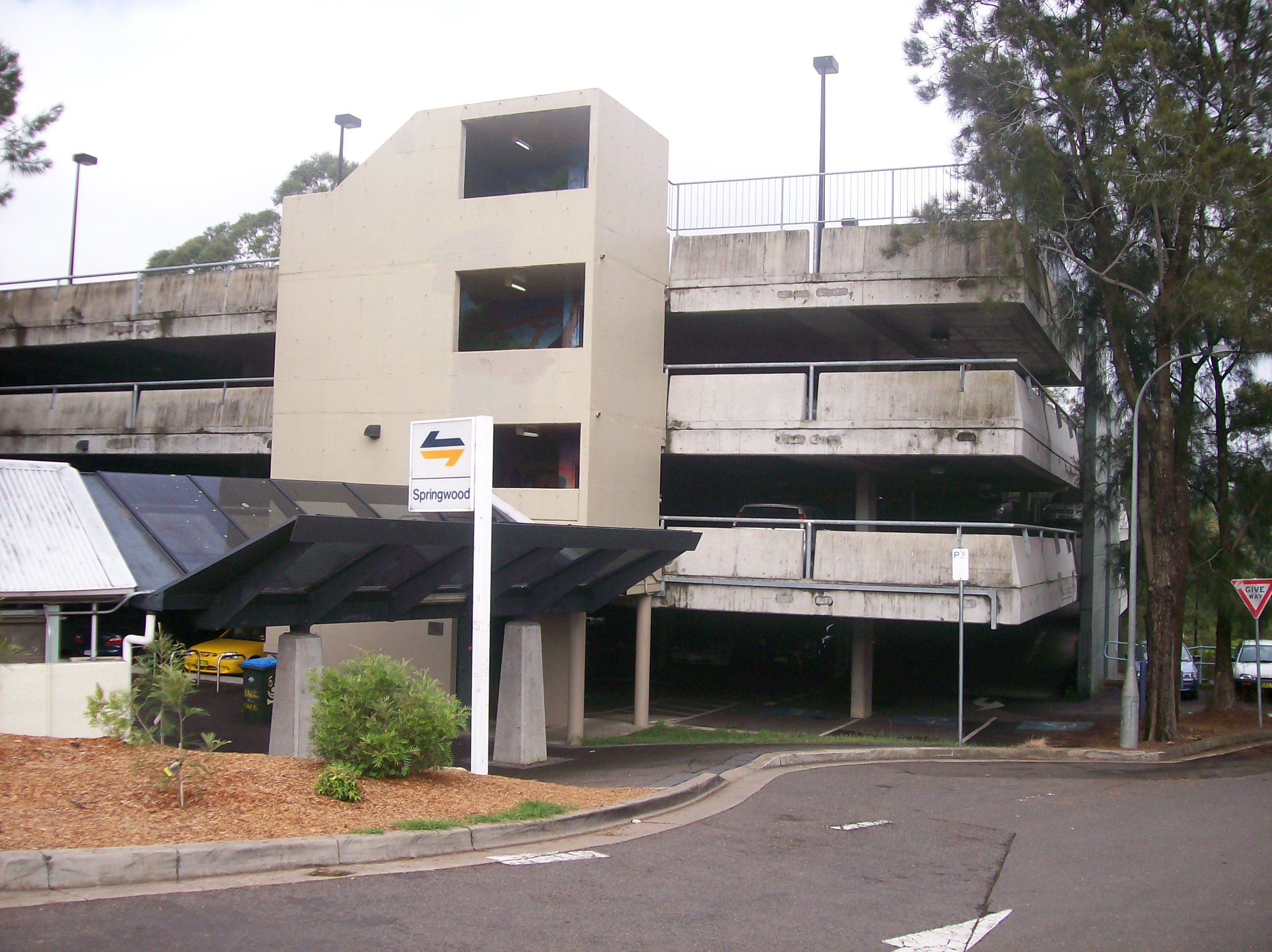
Springwood railway station carpark 2011

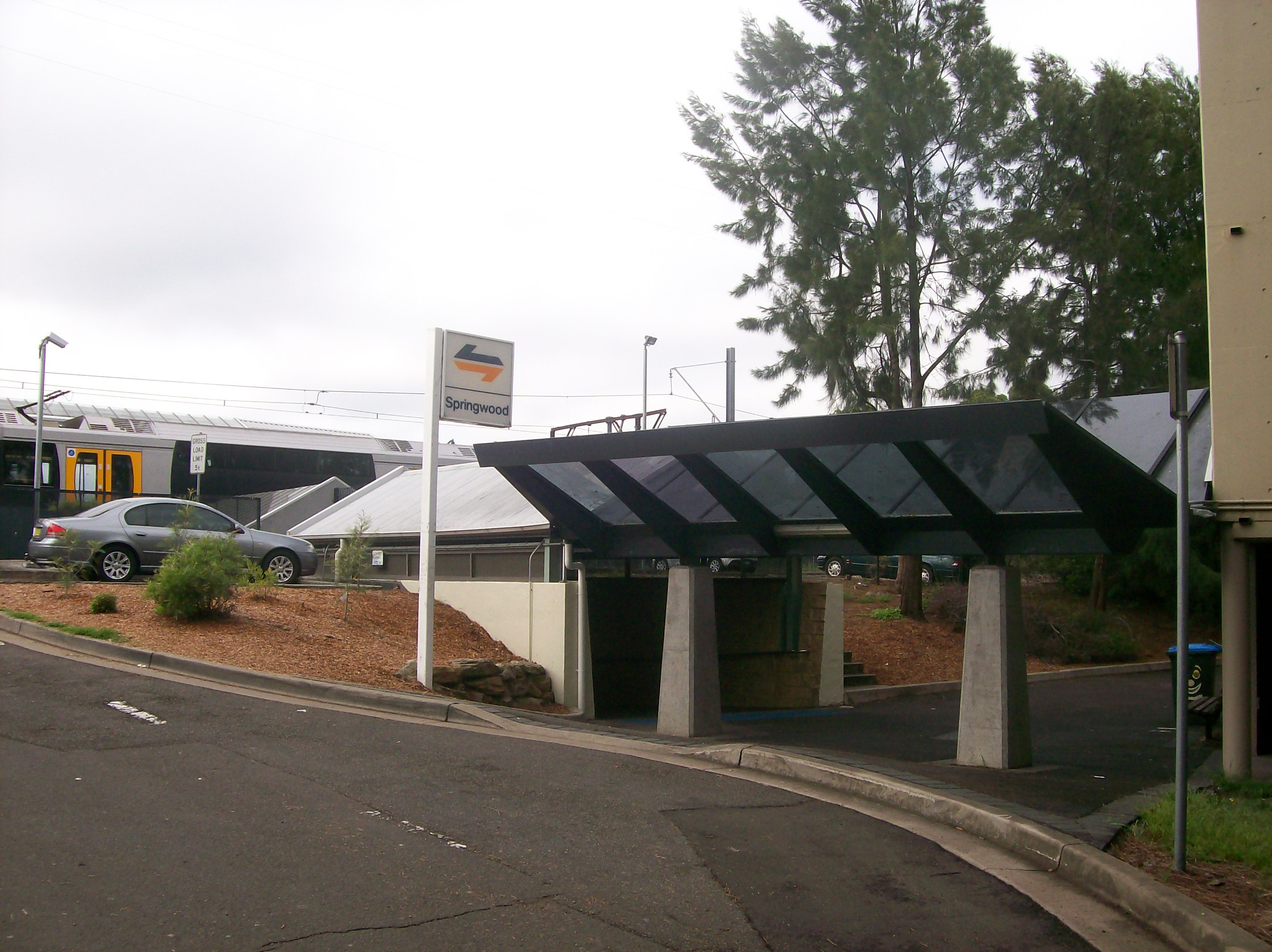
Springwood railway station entrance 2011

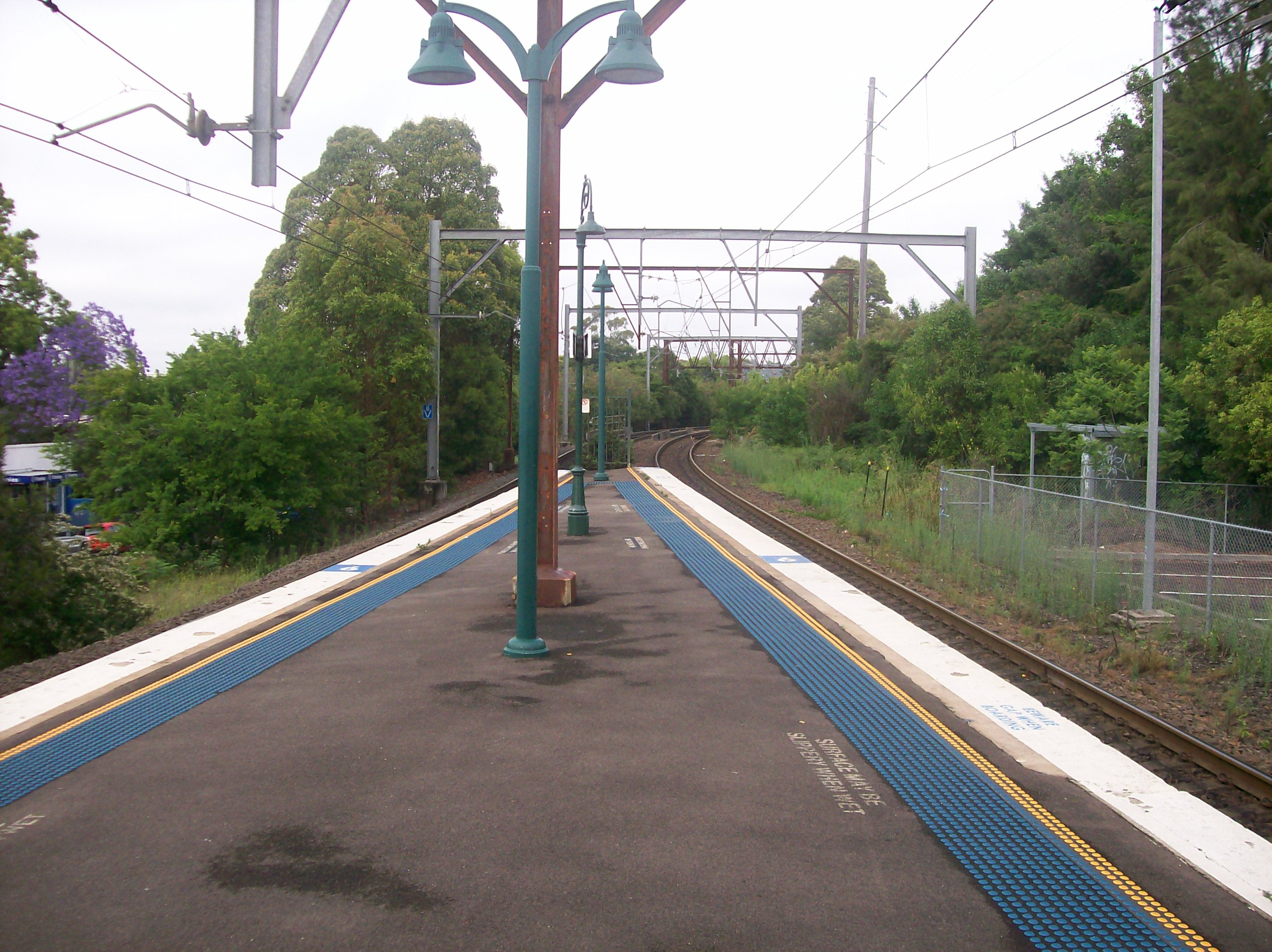
Springwood railway station north end 2011

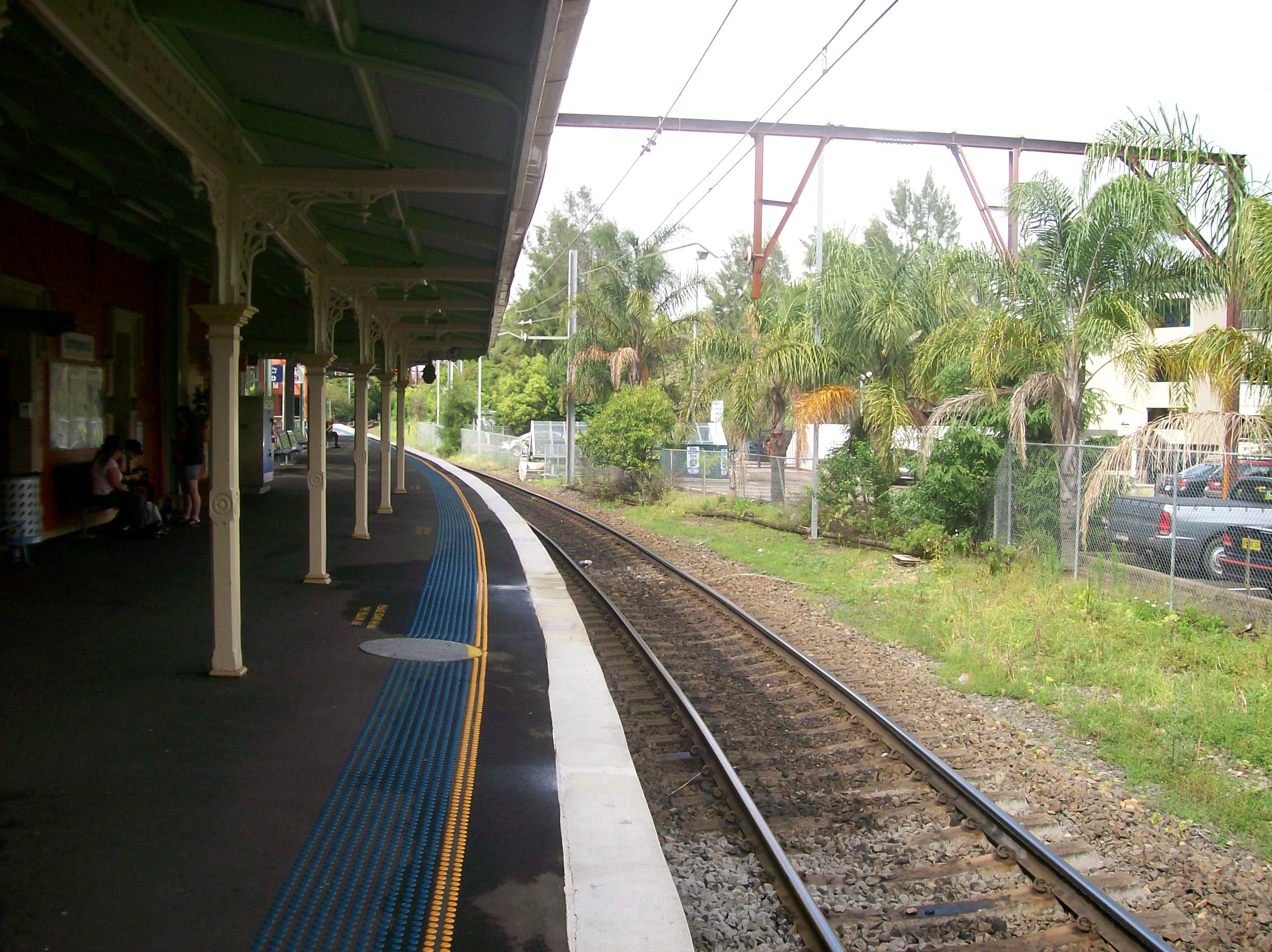
Springwood railway station platform 1 middle 2011

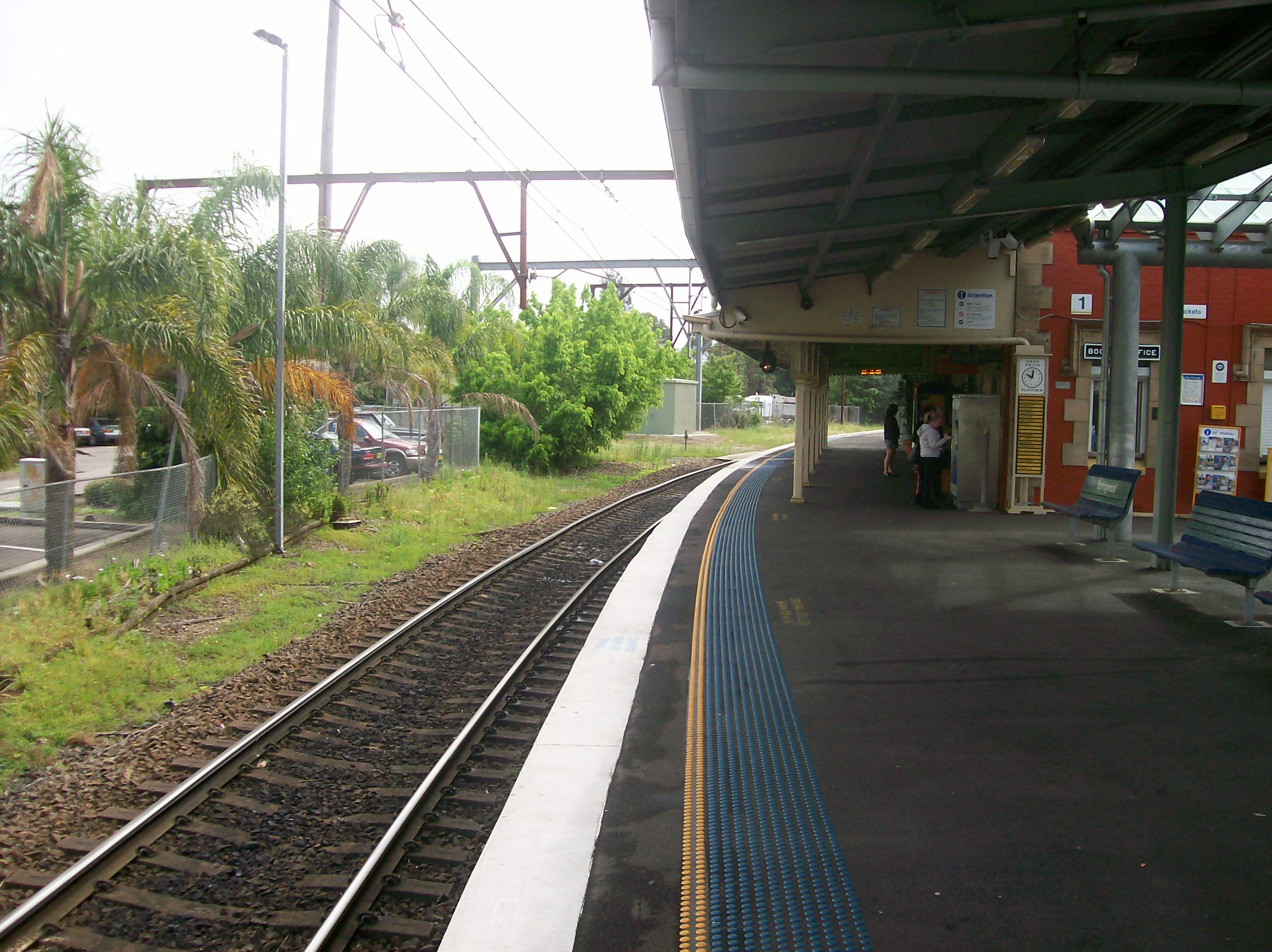
Springwood railway station platform 1 south 2011

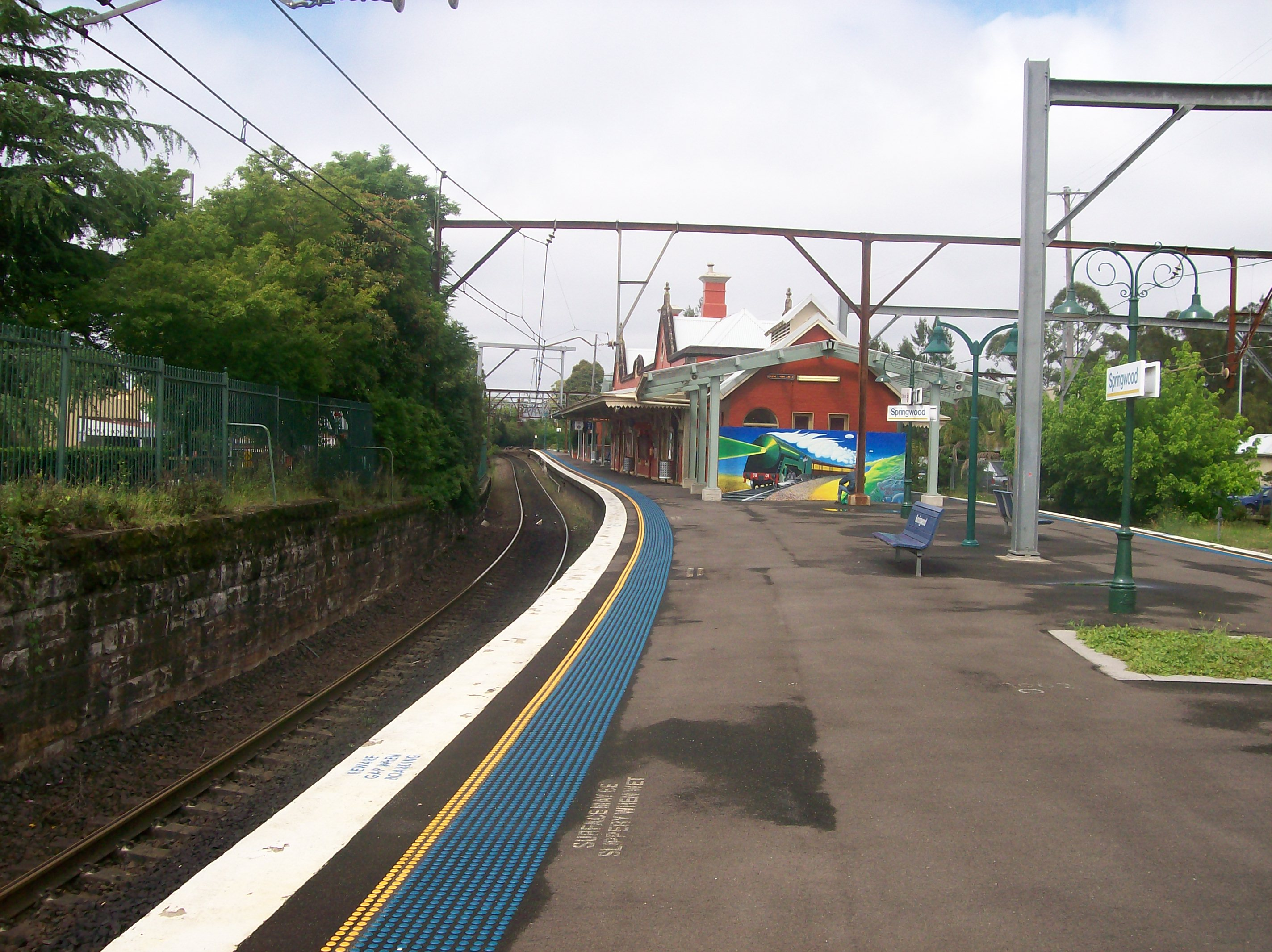
Springwood railway station platform 2 2011

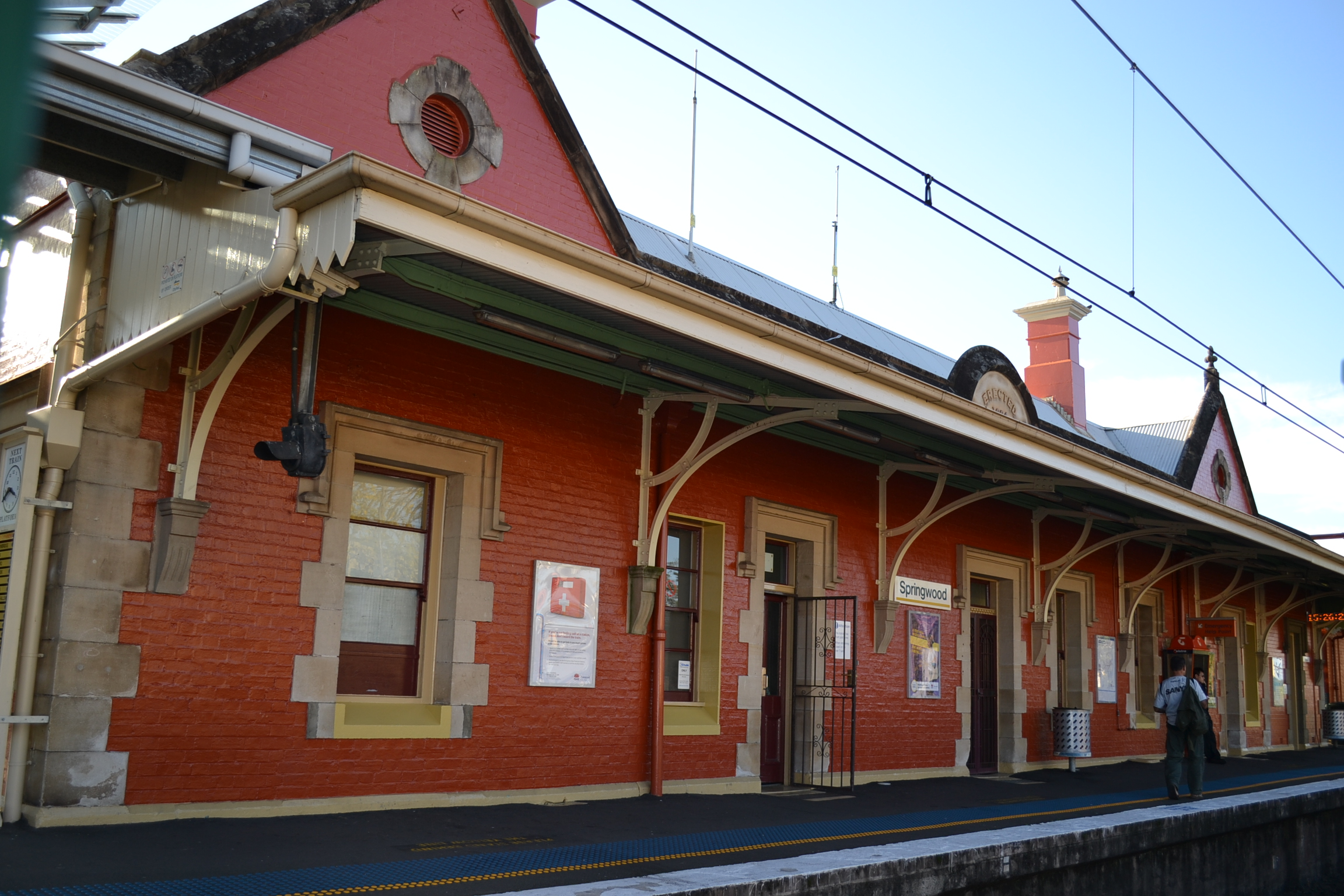
Springwood Station Platform 2 2011

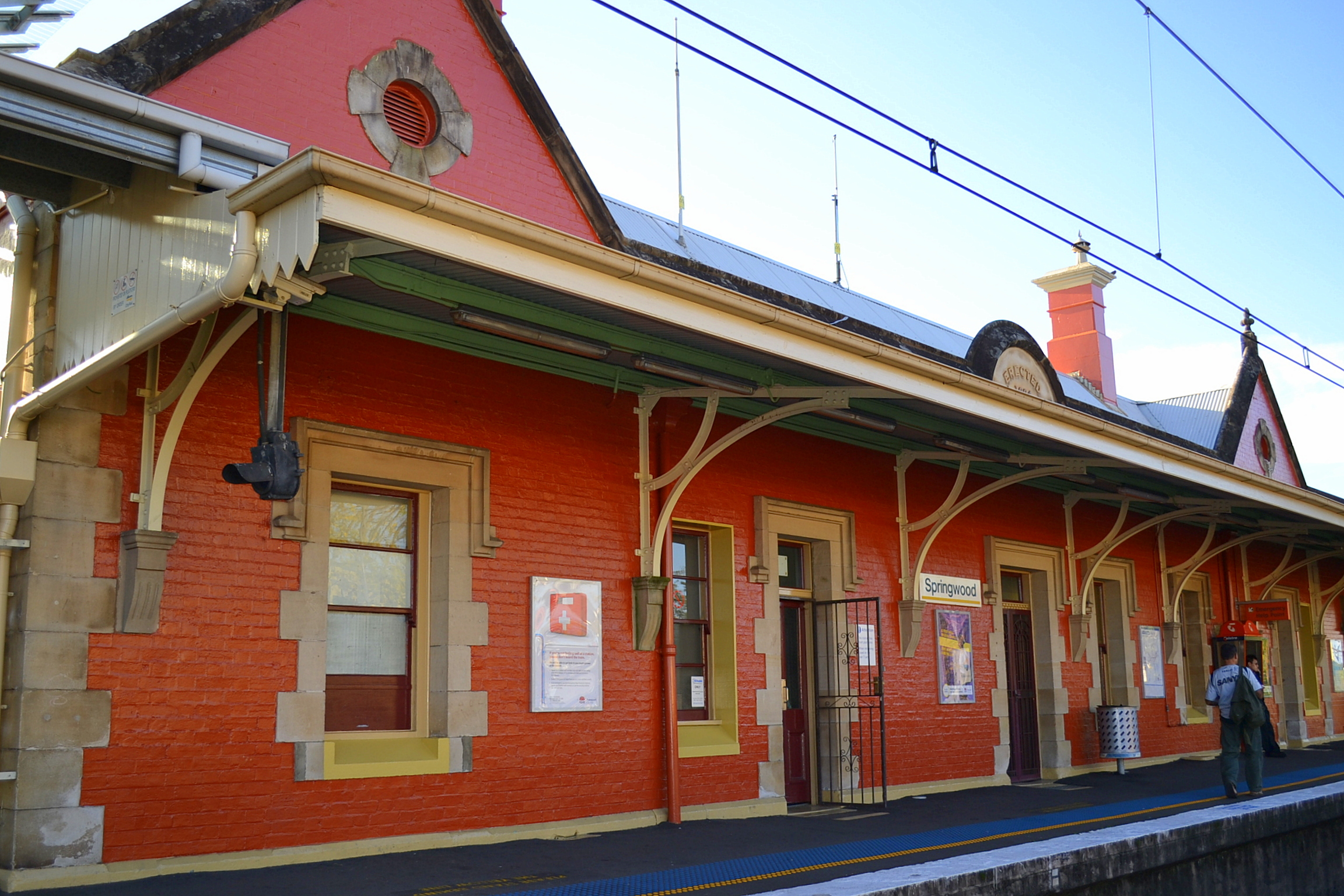
Springwood Station Platform 2 2015

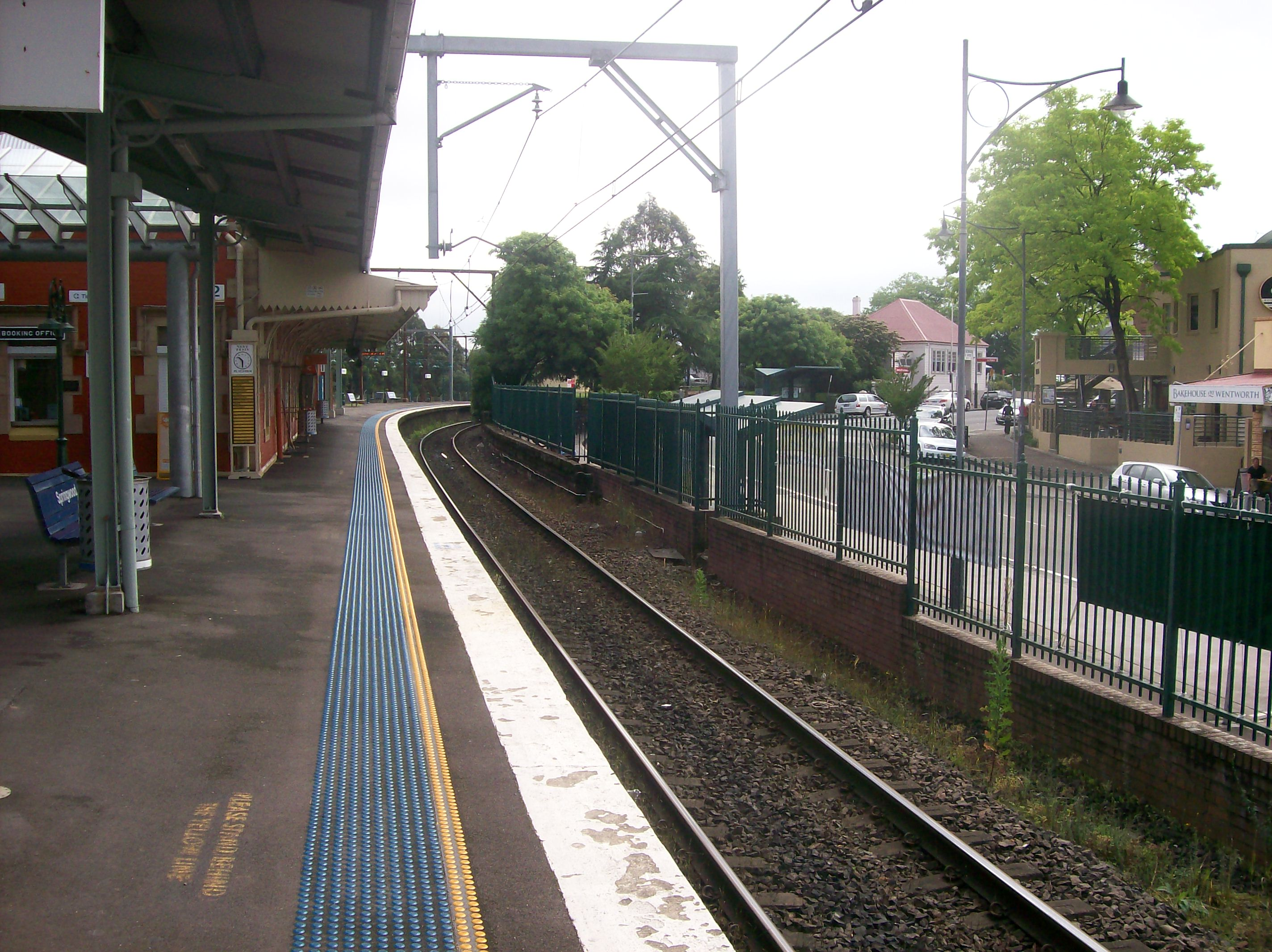
Springwood railway station platform 2 south 2011

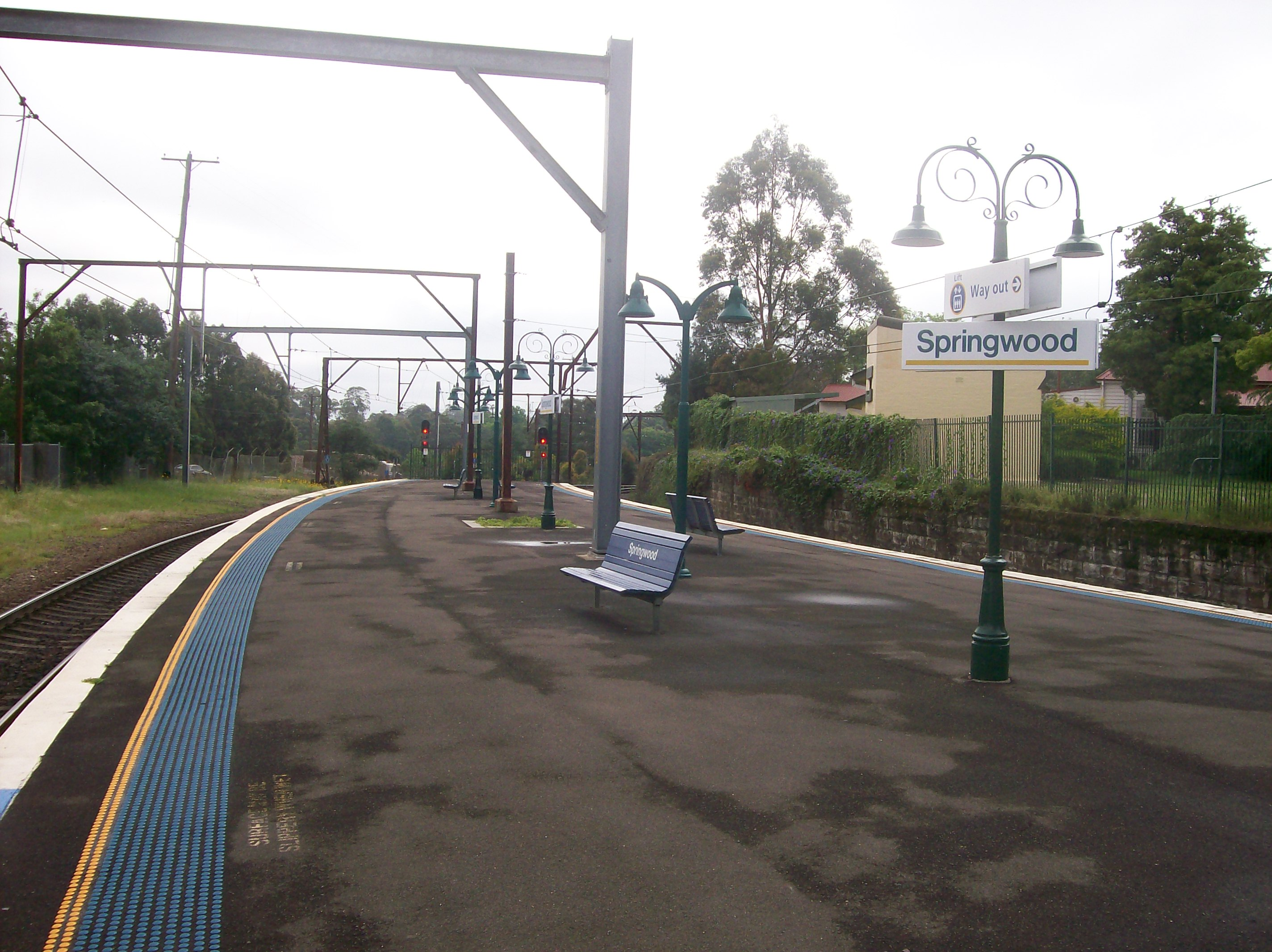
Springwood railway station south end 2011

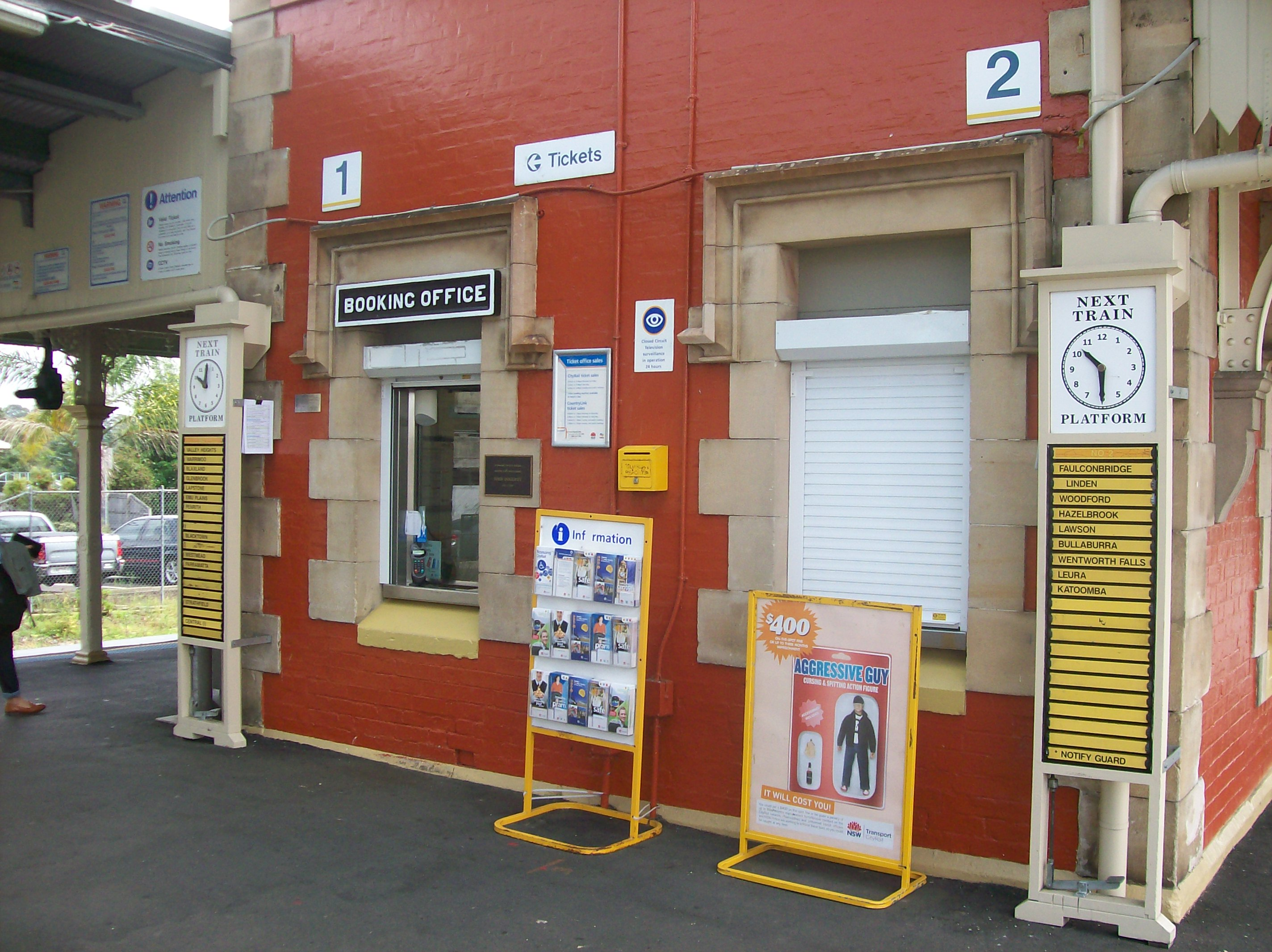
Springwood railway station ticket office 2011

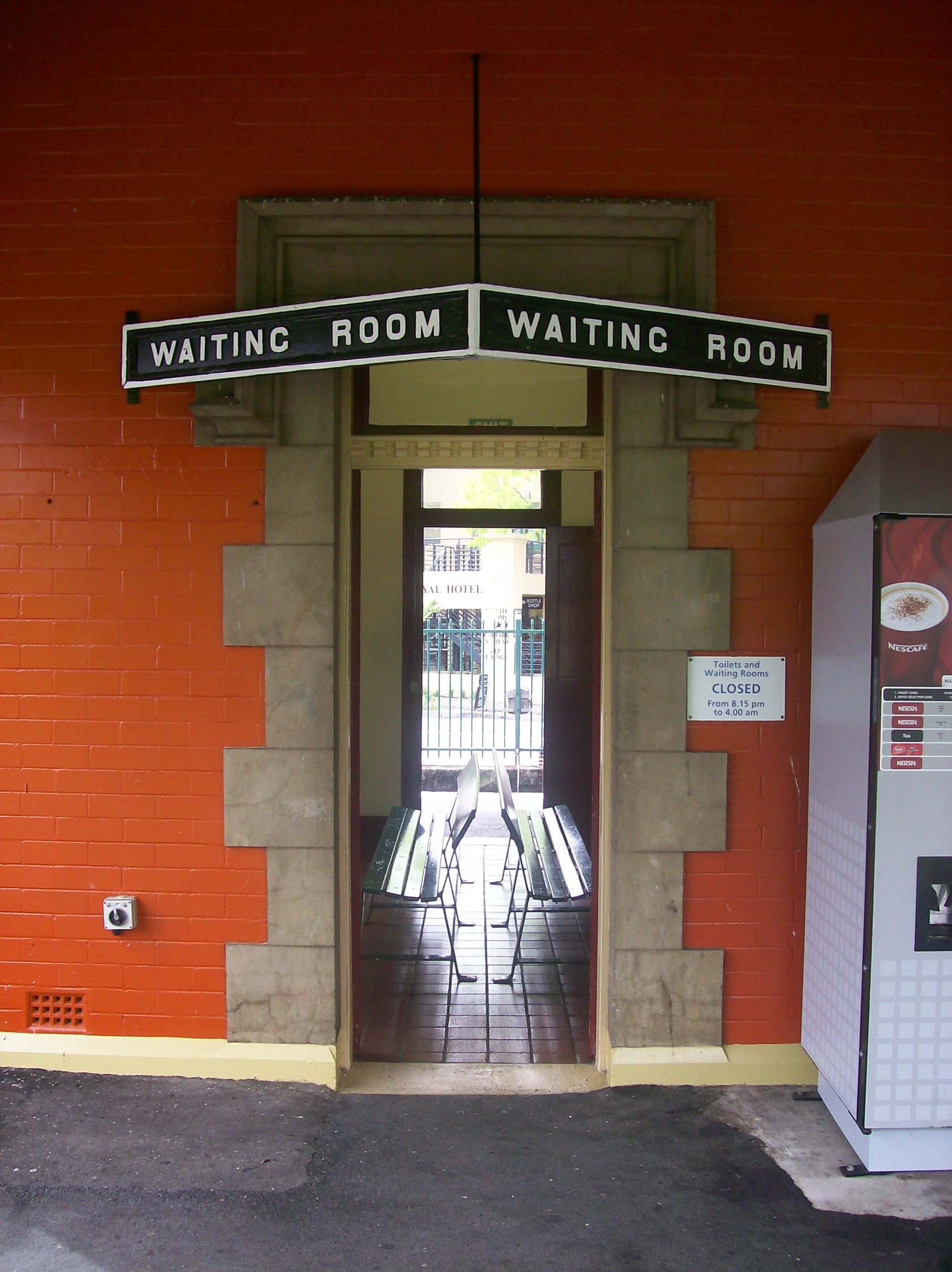
Springwood railway station waiting room 2011

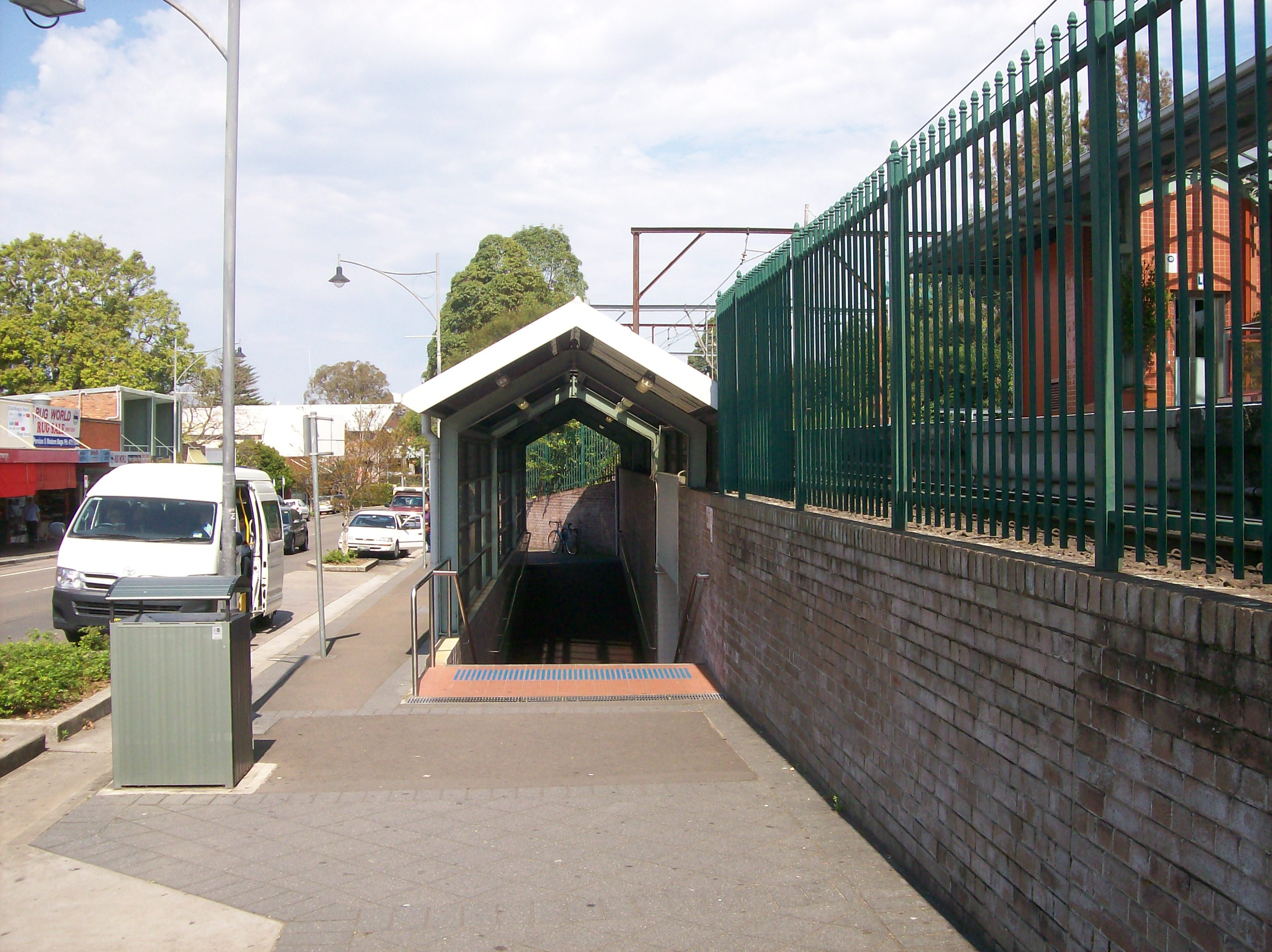
Springwood railway station entrance east side 2012

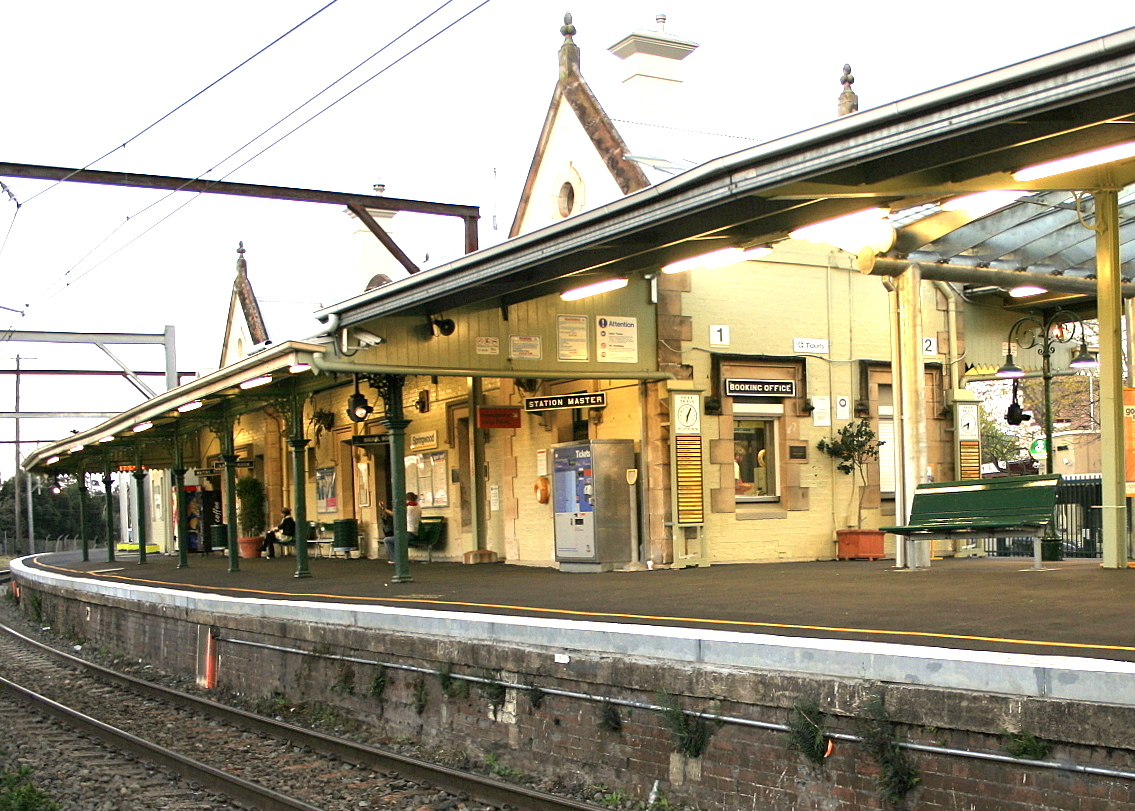
Springwood Station platform 1 2007 (a)

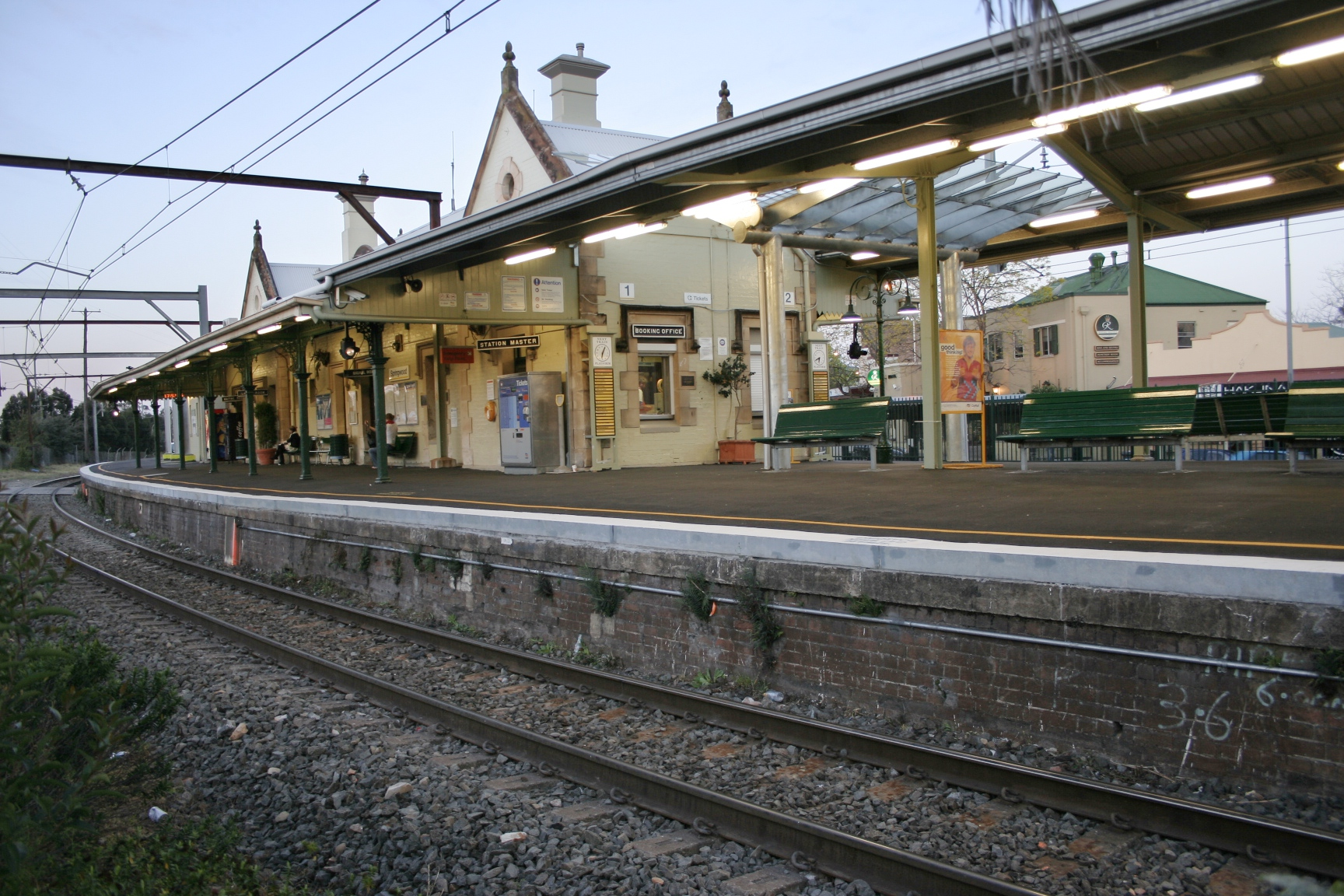
Springwood station platform 1 2007 (b)

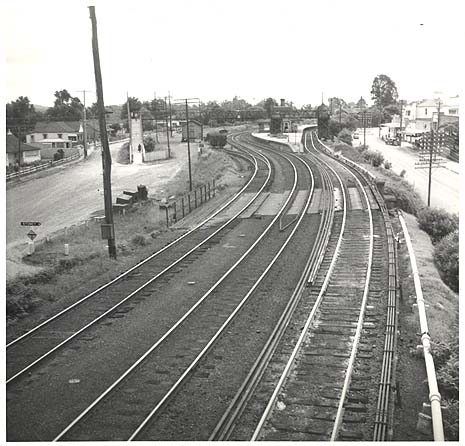
Railway Station – Springwood 1953

== See also ==
- List of railways stations in New South Wales
