= Yellow Rock, New South Wales =

Yellow Rock, New South Wales may refer to:

- Yellow Rock, New South Wales (Blue Mountains), Australia
- Yellow Rock, New South Wales (Shellharbour), Australia
