= Hawkesbury Heights, New South Wales =

Hawkesbury Heights
- Suburb
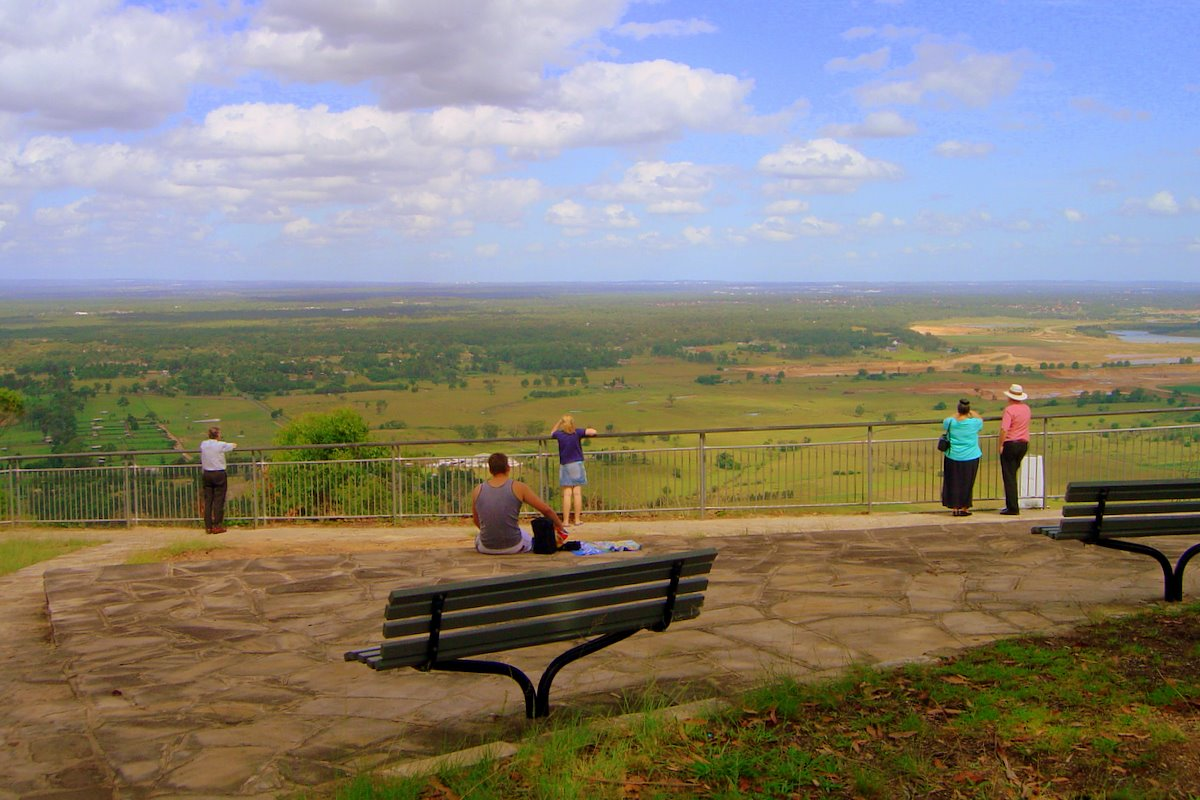
- Hawksbury Lookout overlooking Sydney

- Interactive map of Hawkesbury Heights
- Coordinates: 33°40′S 150°39′E
- Country: Australia
- State: New South Wales
- LGA: City of Blue Mountains
- Location: 77 km (48 mi) W of Sydney CBD

Government
  - Federal division: Macquarie
- Elevation: 264 m (866 ft)

Population
  - Total: 468 (2021 census)
- Postcode: 2777
Suburbs around Hawkesbury Heights
The Devils Wilderness	Yarramundi	Castlereagh
Winmalee	Hawkesbury Heights	Castlereagh
Winmalee	Yellow Rock	Castlereagh

Hawkesbury Heights is a small town in the state of New South Wales, Australia in the City of Blue Mountains. It is located between the townships of Yarramundi and Winmalee. To the south is Yellow Rock. The only road link to the suburb is Hawkesbury Road, which becomes Springwood Road to the east.

== Description ==
The southern edge of the suburb is a creek flowing west-northeast and the Hawkesbury Ridge on its northern side. The suburb reaches a height of 264 metres above sea level, and the height changes abruptly to the east where the Hawkesbury-Springwood Road cuts a pass, including at the top the Hawkesbury lookout with parking and a picnic area. A few hundred metres along the pass is a youth hostel. In the northeast flows Shaws Creek. The southeast of the suburb contains a portion of the Yellomundee Regional Park. Winmalee Rural Fire Brigade covers much of this area and conducts regular training at the lookout and surrounding areas. Hawkesbury Heights is 77km west of Sydney CBD.

== Population ==
At the 2021 census, Hawkesbury Heights had a population of 468 people. 83.8% of people were born in Australia and 91.5% of people spoke only English at home. The most common responses for religion were No Religion 34.5%, Anglican 27.8 and Catholic 23.8%. 58.3% of residents are couples with children. 30.7% of residents are couples without children.

== See also ==
- List of Blue Mountains articles
