= Yellow Rock, New South Wales (Blue Mountains) =

Yellow Rock
- Suburb
- Interactive map of Yellow Rock
- Coordinates: 33°41′42″S 150°37′27″E
- Country: Australia
- State: New South Wales
- LGA: City of Blue Mountains
- Location: 60 km (37 mi) WNW of Sydney CBD

Government
  - State electorate: Blue Mountains
  - Federal division: Macquarie
- Elevation: 245 m (804 ft)

Population
  - Total: 1,119 (2021 census)
- Postcode: 2777
Suburbs around Yellow Rock
Winmalee	Winmalee	Hawkesbury Heights
Springwood	Yellow Rock	Cranebrook
Warrimoo	Mount Riverview	Emu Heights

Yellow Rock is a small village or locality in the Blue Mountains region of New South Wales, Australia. At the 2021 census, Yellow Rock had a population of 1,119.

== Location and features ==
Yellow Rock is located approximately 60 kilometres (37 mi) west north-west of the Sydney central business district, in the Blue Mountains local government area. Yellow Rock is situated on the eastern, lower slopes of the Blue Mountains and the western side of the Nepean River extending back some way from it, the elevation rising from the river to a peak of 245 metres (804 ft) AHD. It is surrounded by the suburbs of Mount Riverview, Warrimoo and Springwood to the south, Winmalee to the west, Hawkesbury Heights and Yarramundi to the north and northeast respectively, and Castlereagh across the Nepean to the east. Yellow Rock is one of Sydney's most western parts, it is a part of the greater western Sydney region.

Much of the Yellomundee Regional Park is contained within the locality. The Yellomundee Regional Park has bike and walking tracks and stretches north-south on the west side of the Nepean River, and the Yellow Rock lookout at the end of Yellow Rock Road. Frasers Creek flows in a west-northeast direction in the north part of the suburb, passing north of the lookout through the park to the river. The northern border of the suburb is a creek, opposite of which is the Hawkesbury Ridge.

The village of Yellow Rock has a Rural Fire Service station which is a satellite station to Winmalee Rural Fire Brigade; and a Greek Orthodox monastery.

== October 2013 bushfires ==
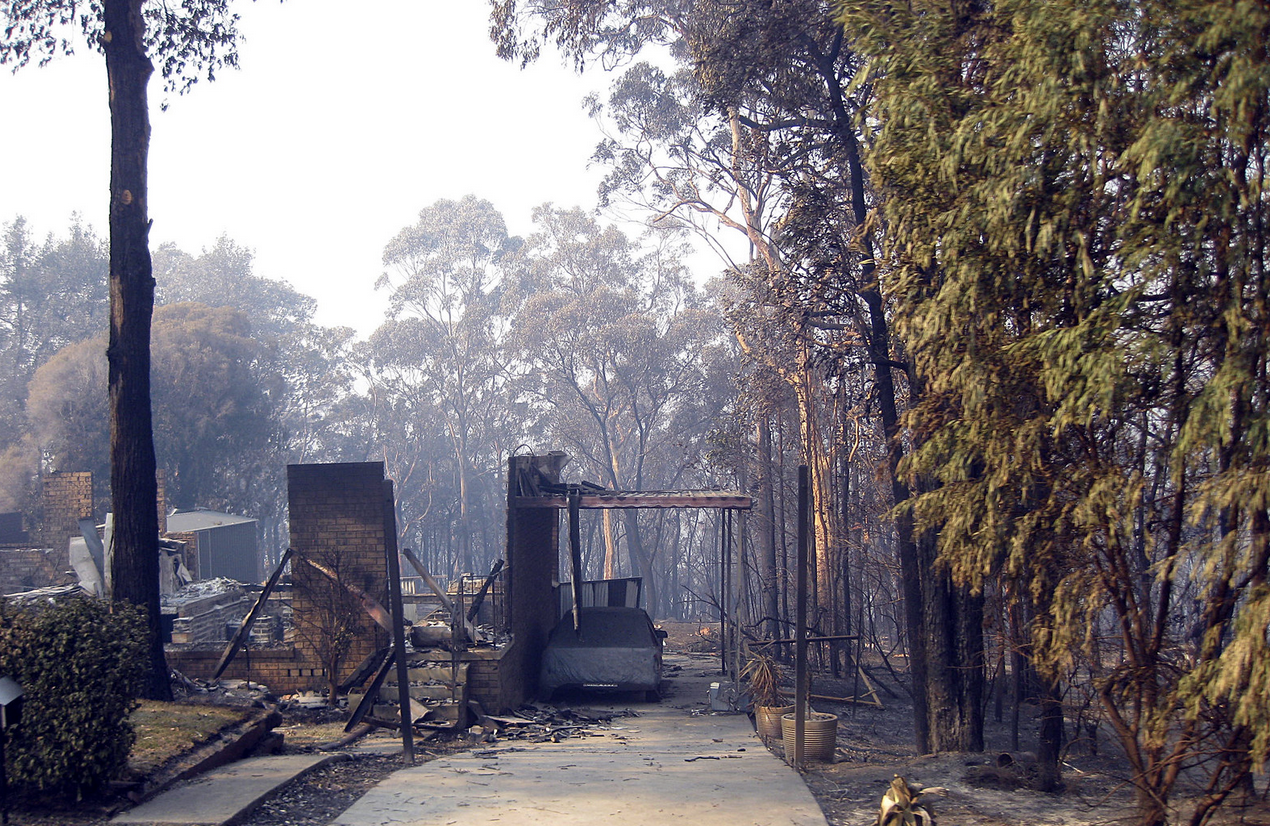
A home destroyed in the 2013 fires in Yellow Rock

The village, surrounding bushland and nearby towns of Springwood and Winmalee were badly affected by bushfires in October 2013. 200 residential properties were destroyed, and 198 damaged in those localities, including a significant number in Yellow Rock.
