= Winmalee High School =

Location
- Winmalee, Blue Mountains, New South Wales; Australia; 33°40′S 150°37′E

Information
- Type: Government-funded co-educational comprehensive secondary day school
- Motto: Strive to achieve
- Established: 1985; 41 years ago
- School district: Blue Mountains: Regional North
- Educational authority: New South Wales Department of Education
- Principal: Voula Facas
- Teaching staff: 59.4 FTE (2018)
- Years: 7–12
- Enrolment: 875 (2018)
- Campus type: Suburban
- Colours: Yellow and maroon
- Website: winmalee-h.schools.nsw.gov.au

Winmalee High School is a government-funded co-educational comprehensive secondary day school, located in Winmalee, a suburb in the City of Blue Mountains, New South Wales, Australia.

Established in 1985, the school caters for approximately 870 students in 2018, from Year 7 to Year 12, of whom four percent identified as Indigenous Australians and eight percent were from a language background other than English. The school is operated by the NSW Department of Education; the principal is Voula Facas.

The school colours are yellow and maroon; and the school's motto is "Strive to Achieve".

== School curriculum, demographics and enrolment ==
There are approximately 875 students enrolled at Winmalee High School. Winmalee High subjects include drama, music, dance, business studies, legal studies, computing studies, technology and design, visual arts, photography, languages, food technology and physical education. There are also Higher School Certificate programs offered at rigorous levels of study such as 4 Unit Mathematics and 3 unit subjects such as English, Computing Studies, Physics and Chemistry.

Reflective of its location, the majority of students are Anglo-Saxon in origin, and the student and staff body is largely culturally homogeneous. This has changed slightly in recent years, and new arrivals to the school have enriched the school's diversity.

In addition to their studies, students at Winmalee High School have the option to take part in on the job training in such specialities as building and construction, metals and engineering, industrial technology and hospitality which are usually unavailable at similar public high schools. Students also have the opportunity to link into joint TAFE courses as part of their HSC.

Students can also be involved in a sporting situation called mountain sports. This is a government funded organisation and allows children to be involved with sports directly through the school which is very helpful for the parents who work long hours. The organisation picks up children from the school and drops them off at sporting locations such as Summerhayes Park.

== Architectural significance ==
Being designed fairly recently in 1985 Winmalee High School is of architectural significance; the building is an example of Modern Architecture. It is one of the only High Schools in the Blue Mountains with wheel-chair access into a large percentage of the school which was added recently. 2008 saw the opening of the Performing Arts Centre at the rear of the main hall. The Performing Arts Centre was designed to cater for drama and small performances as well as a rehearsal space and holding room for the biennial school Musical. The school has a wide range of rooms, including general 'learning spaces', science laboratories, 11 computer labs, specialty music rooms, art studios, large wood and metal technology rooms, textiles and food technology labs, one of which has recently been refitted with new restaurant quality commercial equipment. A new trade training centre has been built as part of the Applied Technology faculty adjoining the newly refurbished food technology lab. A new fitness centre has also recently been built for PDHPE lessons.

== Sporting success ==
Winmalee High School has a strong sporting culture that has resulted in success in a number of sports. Typically dominant amongst local High Schools, Winmalee has been represented strongly at State CHS level in Track and Field, Basketball, Cross Country running, Netball and a number of other sports.

In the late 1990s to mid 2000s Winmalee High School achieved remarkable success in both Men's Basketball and Netball. In 2002 and 2006 the Winmalee Worms Men's Netball team won the State Netball title.

Winmalee High School, coached by Trevor Hamilton, has also enjoyed a great deal of success in boys' and girls' water polo, most notably in 2011 with the boy's teams winning the Sydney West Championship at both Open and U15 level. The school also provided 40% of the squad members for the Sydney West Representative side which competed in the State Open Championship in Alstonville in November 2011. Winmalee Captain, Sam Nangle, was awarded the MVP for the tournament and has subsequently gone on to play professionally in Greece and Spain, and for the national side, the Aussie Sharks.

The school continued its success in 2012, taking out the Sydney West Championship at both U15 and Open level for the second year running. The opens team proceeded to go as far as the quarterfinals of the State Championships. The school provided 2 of the starting lineups for the Sydney West Representative side who competed in the State Open Championship in Albury in November 2012. Both of these players were subsequently selected for the Combined High Schools squad who would compete at the National Championships in early 2013.

Swimming has also been an area of success. Mathew Wilson is the highest profile Alumni having represented Australia at the Tokyo Olympics and previously holding the world record for the 200m breaststroke.

In 2019 Winmalee High sent two teams, a junior boys' team (composed of Year 7 and 8 students) and an intermediate boys' team (composed of Year 9 and 10 students) to Sydney Olympic Park to compete in the Nitro Athletics Championships. Winmalee High became the first non-private, non-selective school to participate in the Sydney Schools Championships and concluded the Championships with relative success; the Junior boys' team finishing in 6th position and the Intermediate boys' team finishing 5th. To compete against some of the top private schools in Sydney, including the World Nitro Champions, Trinity Grammar School (New South Wales), was a huge credit to the school and testament to the athletic achievements of its students.

== Notable alumni ==
- Julia Jacklin
- Anja Nissen
- Matthew Wilson (swimmer)

== See also ==
- List of government schools in New South Wales: Q–Z
- Education in Australia
