= Yellomundee Regional Park =

State park in New South Wales, Australia

- IUCN category V (protected landscape/seascape)
- Location within New South Wales
- Location: New South Wales
- Nearest city: Penrith
- Coordinates: 33°40′24″S 150°39′04″E
- Area: 4.85 km^{2} (1.87 sq mi)
- Established: August 2000
- Governing body: NSW National Parks & Wildlife Service
- Website: Official website

The Yellomundee Regional Park is a protected regional park that is located on the eastern escarpment of the Blue Mountains region of New South Wales in eastern Australia. The 485-hectare (1,200-acre) regional park is situated approximately 30 kilometres (19 mi) north-west of Penrith and 25 kilometres (16 mi) south-west of Richmond. The park is situated in a region that is part of the Great Escarpment formed by the orogeny that created the Great Dividing Range.

== Location and features ==
The park stretches 8.6 kilometres (5.3 mi) in a north-south direction from Yarramundi to Mount Riverview and Emu Heights and contains mountain bike, horse, and hiking tracks, and several lookouts. The park is located west of the Nepean River, overlooking and abuts the river for approximately 4 kilometres (2.5 mi).

Yellomundee Regional Park is distinct in that only about one fifth of the land has been modified and it contains large areas of natural bushland as well as cultural and historical sites. The park protects areas of alluvial and riverine plant communities.

== See also ==
- Protected areas of New South Wales
