= Winmalee, New South Wales =

Suburb in the Blue Mountains, New South Wales, Australia

Winmalee
- Town
- Interactive map of Winmalee
- Coordinates: 33°40′21″S 150°37′08″E
- Country: Australia
- State: New South Wales
- LGA: City of Blue Mountains
- Location: 77 km (48 mi) west of Sydney CBD; 36 km (22 mi) east of Katoomba, New South Wales
- Established: 1972

Government
  - State electorate: Blue Mountains
  - Federal division: Macquarie
- Elevation: 310 m (1,020 ft)

Population
  - Total: 6,388 (2021 census)
- Postcode: 2777
Localities around Winmalee
Faulconbridge	Yarramundi	Hawkesbury Heights
Faulconbridge	Winmalee	Hawkesbury Heights
Springwood	Springwood	Hawkesbury Heights

Winmalee is a suburb in New South Wales, Australia. Winmalee is located 77 kilometres (48 mi) west of the Sydney CBD, in the local government area of the City of Blue Mountains. As of the 2021 census, Winmalee has a population of 6,388.

Originally known as North Springwood, Winmalee was officially established in 1972. Springwood is historically significant as the first European settlement in the Blue Mountains. Winmalee is surrounded by Blue Mountains National Park. This National Park is on the World Heritage List and is known as the Greater Blue Mountains Area World Heritage Site. Winmalee extends from Birdwood Avenue and Paulwood Avenue to Coramandel Avenue and east to a point part-way along Singles Ridge Road.

== History ==
=== Aboriginal heritage ===
The area now officially known as Winmalee was once inhabited by Aboriginal Australians known as the Dharug people. This was a nomadic people which inhabited much of the Lower Blue Mountains until European colonisation and settlement. The dialect spoken by the people is known as the Dharug language.

=== Name ===
Winmalee is said to be a non Dharug, Aboriginal, word for North. The name was chosen by a 14-year-old, who won a competition to find a name for North Springwood when the Geographical Names Board wanted to remove the compass prefixes from the names of suburbs and suburbs of New South Wales.

=== Post settlement ===
In 1970, the Geographical Names Board of New South Wales suggested that the area which had been unofficially known as 'North Springwood' be made an independent suburb of the Blue Mountains and renamed 'White Cross' because of the rapidly increasing population growth of Springwood. However residents of the area objected to the name 'White Cross'.

In 1971, the Department of Education selected "Winmalee" as the name for a new school in the area. Though the residents of the area approved this as the name for the proposed school they rejected it as a name for the suburb. The name Winmalee was chosen by the Department of Education as the result of a competition that had been organised amongst the local people. Terry Macauley, who was to be one of the school's original primary students, suggested the name "Winmalee", a supposed Aboriginal word for North. The word was in fact never used by the Dharug people in relation to the area, but is instead a reference to its previous unofficial name.

Winmalee was finally officially established as an independent suburb on 28 April 1972 after the Minister for Lands, Tom Lewis MLA announced the suburb's separation from Springwood and approved the name Winmalee despite objections from residents.

=== October 2013 bushfires ===
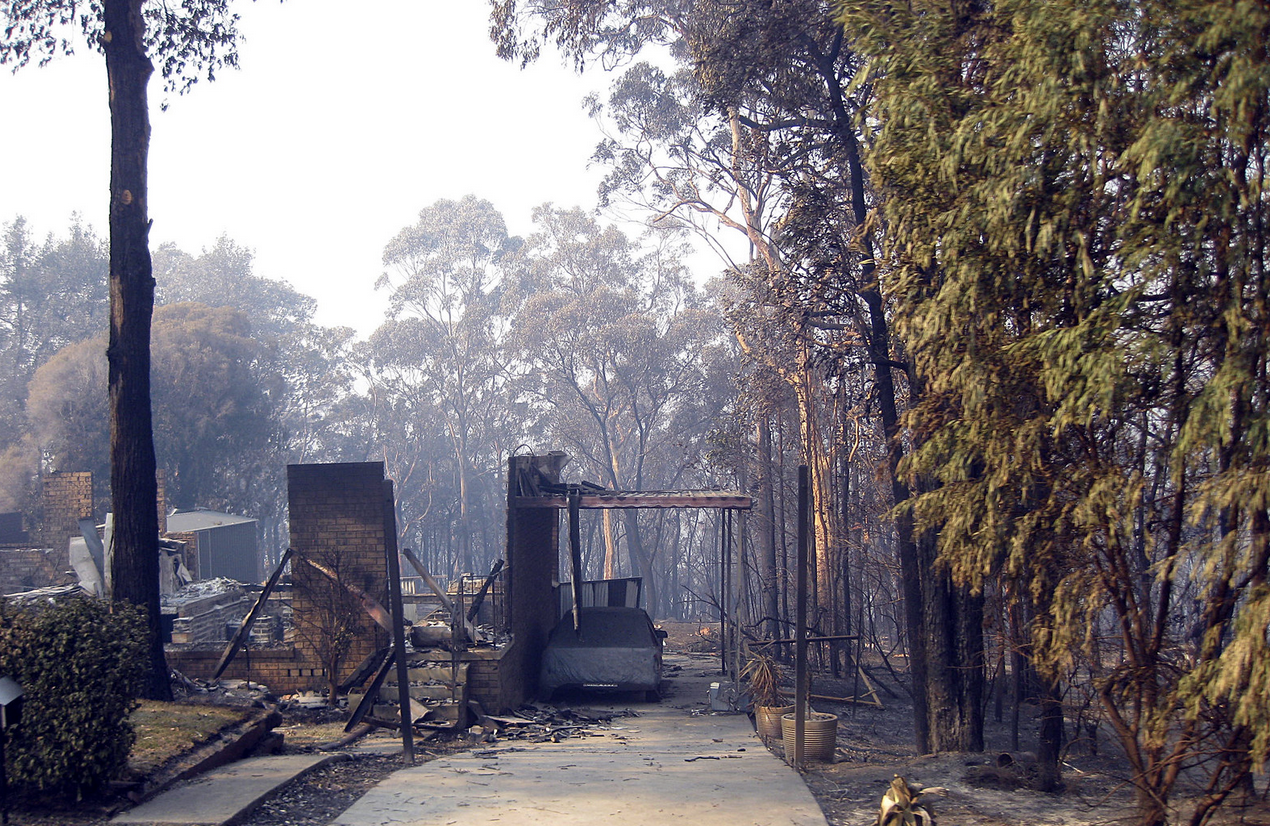
A home destroyed by the fires in nearby Yellow Rock

The suburb, the nearby village of Yellow Rock and a small part of the adjacent suburb of Springwood were badly affected by a bushfire which started on 17 October 2013. 196 residential properties were destroyed, and 109 damaged. 40 homes were destroyed on Buena Vista Road in Winmalee alone.

== Education ==
=== High schools ===
Winmalee has two high schools. The first High School established in the Winmalee area was St Columba's High School. Originally a Catholic seminary, it was re-established as a high school in 1979, but did not cater for years 11 and 12 until 1993. The school and its grounds are some of the oldest forms of architecture in the area. The St Columbas property is one of the largest property holdings in the Blue Mountains. The whole of the St Columbas property is a Heritage property. St Columba's High School established the first Japanese sister school agreement in the Blue Mountains with Hokusetsu Sanda Senior High School in Sanda, Hyōgo.

Winmalee High School was the first high school developed after the suburb was named Winmalee and had established independence. It was officially established in 1985. Winmalee High has Sister School agreements with Arima Senior High School in Sanda City, Japan, Aurora College in Invercargill, New Zealand and Hillcrest School in Birmingham, UK

=== Primary schools ===
There are two primary schools in Winmalee. St Thomas Aquinas Primary School opened in 1920 with a total school enrolment of 24 pupils. The school was staffed up until the early 1980s by the Sisters of St Joseph. The school moved to its current site off Hawkesbury Road in 1982, which is situated on the same grounds as St Columba's High School.

Winmalee Public School's first year was in 1972 when pupils boarded at Springwood Primary. The first classes were held at Winmalee in the last weeks of 1972, but the school began on the site at the beginning of 1973.

Ellison Public School, located in Springwood, also draws in students from Winmalee.

== Churches ==
- St. Thomas Aquinas Catholic Church
- St George's Anglican Church Winmalee (part of Anglican Churches Springwood)
- Winmalee Presbyterian Church (part of Springwood Winmalee Presbyterian Church)
- Winmalee Gospel Chapel (part of Christian Brethren in NSW)

== Parks and recreation ==
Summerhayes Park is a public reserve which is used for sport and recreational activities. Its facilities include tennis and netball/basketball courts, a skate park, outdoor gym equipment and fields for Football (soccer) both local (NDSFA) and Representative (FNSW) all year round. It is the home of Springwood United Football Club (formally Springwood Soccer & Sports Club), Winmalee Netball Club, Springwood Netball Club and a variety of other clubs. Summerhayes Park has a large diversity of native flora and fauna and contains many threatened or endangered species and ecological communities.

== Commercial areas ==
The Winmalee Village centre was officially opened in the early 1980s and refurbished in 2005. It comprises 22 specialty shops including Coles Supermarket and other specialty shops. There are also other smaller shopping districts. There is a small strip mall located on Hawkesbury Road with a Caltex petrol station, car mechanic, takeaway shop, butcher, hair salon and a general store. The Australia Post office has moved to the Winmalee Village Centre. There is also another very small shopping area, near the Village Centre, with a pizza shop, hairdressers and a gymnasium.

== Winmalee Rural Fire Brigade ==
Winmalee Rural Fire Brigade is a Volunteer Fire Brigades located in New South Wales. The brigade was created as North Springwood Bush Fire Brigade in 1963. As of 2025 it has approximately 50 members and a reserve of 150. Its first captain was Lin Paish. Previously fire fighting in the suburb had been disorganised, with the only protection being a single hose at a "hosebox point". In 1972 a volunteer unit, manned by trainee priests, was established at St Columba's Catholic College.

The brigade was involved in the 1968 Bushfires, during which 3 volunteers died. Later it was heavily involved in the 2013 NSW Bushfires, which devastated parts of Winmalee

== Demographics ==
In the 2021 Census there were 6,388 people residing in Winmalee. The population consisted of 84.8% born in Australia, including 2.8% Aboriginal or Torres Strait Islander. 4.5% were born in England. In the voluntary question about religion, the most common responses in Winmalee were No Religion, 42.1%, Catholic 23.4%, Anglican 15.0% and Presbyterian and Reformed with 3.2%. Christianity was the largest religious group reported overall (54.4%) in Winmalee.
