= Yarramundi, New South Wales =

Yarramundi
- Suburb
- Interactive map of Yarramundi
- Coordinates: 33.6222°S 150.6709°E
- Country: Australia
- State: New South Wales
- City: Sydney
- LGA: City of Hawkesbury
- Location: 69 km (43 mi) from Sydney CBD

Government
  - State electorate: Hawkesbury
  - Federal division: Macquarie
- Elevation: 45 m (148 ft)

Population
  - Total: 829 (2021 census)
- Postcode: 2753
Suburbs around Yarramundi
Grose Vale	Grose Wold	Richmond
Faulconbridge	Yarramundi	Agnes Banks
Winmalee	Hawkesbury Heights	Castlereagh

Yarramundi is a suburb of Sydney, in the state of New South Wales, Australia. Yarramundi is located 69 kilometres west of the Sydney central business district, in the local government area of the City of Hawkesbury.

== History ==
The suburb is named after Yarramundi, an Indigenous Australian of the Boorooberongal clan of the Darug people. He was a garadyi or 'doctor' and was called by Europeans 'the chief of the Richmond Tribe'.

This area was previously known as Kearns Retreat.

Nepean Sand and Gravel Limited established a sand mine on the island at Yarramundi Falls in 1925. An aerial ropeway connected the island with railway sidings near Phillip, where the former railway to Kurrajong crossed the river. Following a flood which destroyed the ropeway, a railway was laid in 1927 from the existing sidings to the mine on the island. This railway was operated by their own locomotives. In July 1946, the transport was replaced by road trucks.

The Yarramundi Rural Fire Brigade is located on Springwood Road in Yarramundi.

== Sport and recreation ==
- Camp Yarramundi (YMCA)
- Yellowmundee Track – Yarramundi, NSW – Western Sydney Mountain Bike Club.
- Action Paintball Games

== Population ==
The population was 597 in the 2001 Census, growing to 798 in the 2006 Census and 866 in the 2011 census, dropping to 829 in 2021.
