= Blue Gum Swamp =

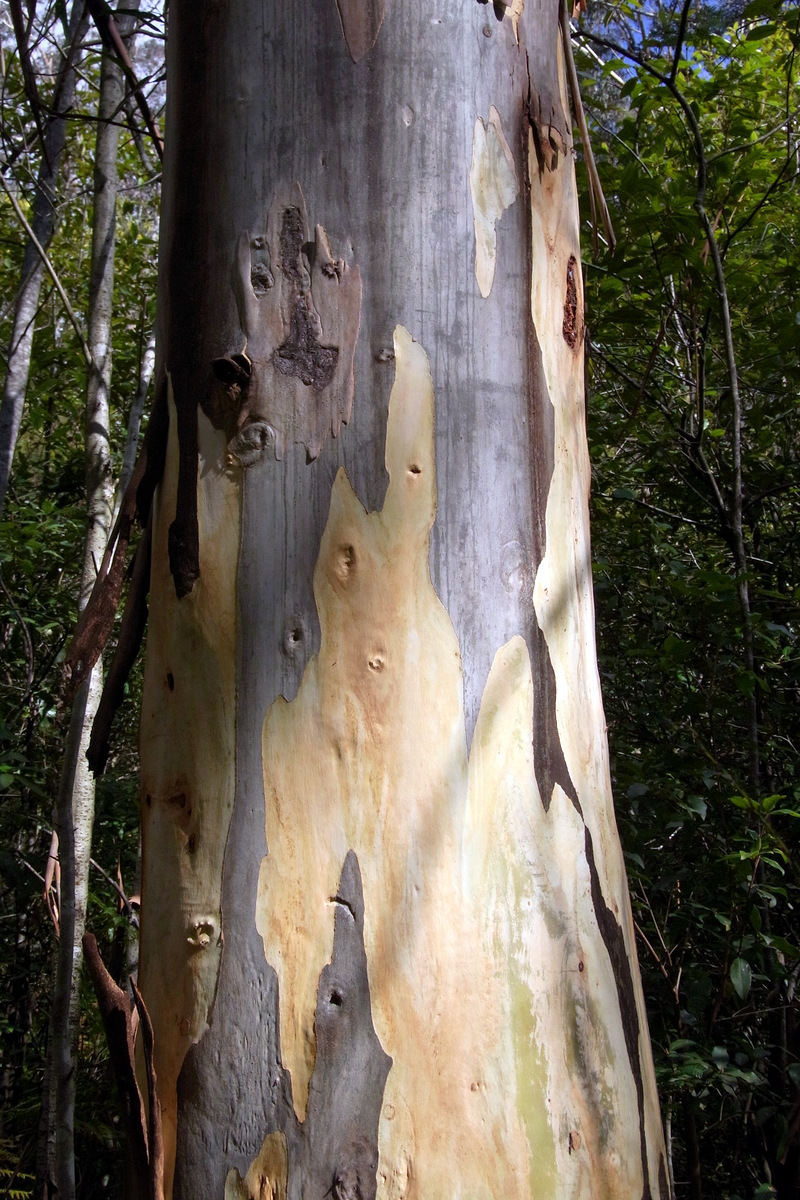
- Mountain blue gum trunk/bark

- Coordinates: 33°39.065′S 150°36.340′E
- Country: Australia
- State: New South Wales

The Blue Gum Swamp is a swamp located in Blue Mountains National Park in the lower Grose Valley of the Blue Mountains, in New South Wales west of Sydney, southeastern Australia. It is situated adjacent to the Blue Gum Swamp Creek near Winmalee and is within the UNESCO World Heritage Site known as the Greater Blue Mountains Area.

== Natural history ==
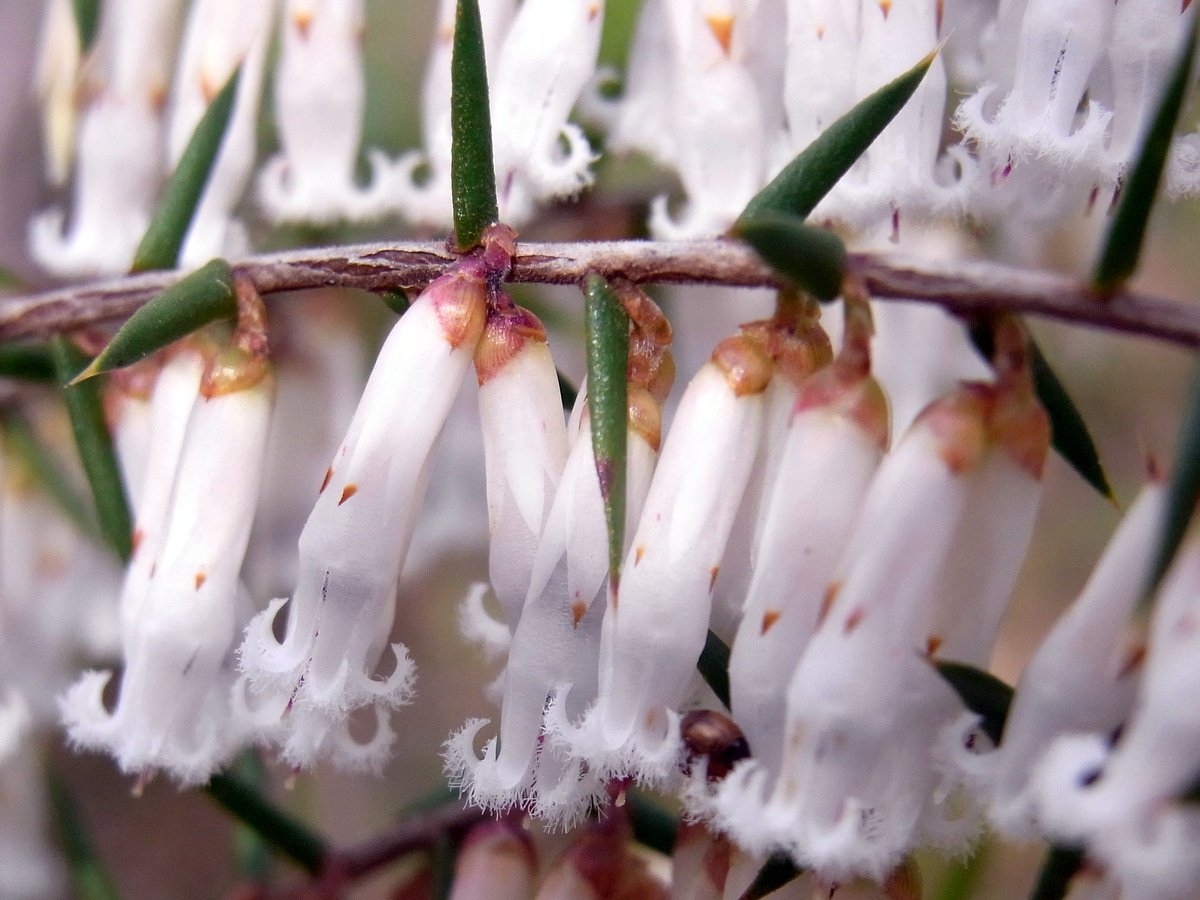
Leucopogon fletcheri flowers in the Blue Gum Swamp.

In the ancient past, the valley floor was blocked. This caused a residual alluvial deposit, which resulted in relatively deep and fertile soils. The tall mountain blue gum (Eucalyptus deanei) trees in the gully may reach 50 metres (160 ft) in height. On the ridges the dry stunted vegetation is typical of much of the sandstone based areas near Sydney.

The area is well regarded by bird watchers. Noteworthy species here include the powerful owl, lyrebird, sooty owl, and the tiny Weebill.

Mammal species are mostly nocturnal and not often seen. However, they include the yellow-bellied glider, sugar glider, greater glider, swamp wallaby, common ringtail possum, common brushtail possum, grey-headed flying fox, bandicoots and microbats.

== See also ==
- Protected areas of New South Wales
