= Grose River =

River in Australia

Grose
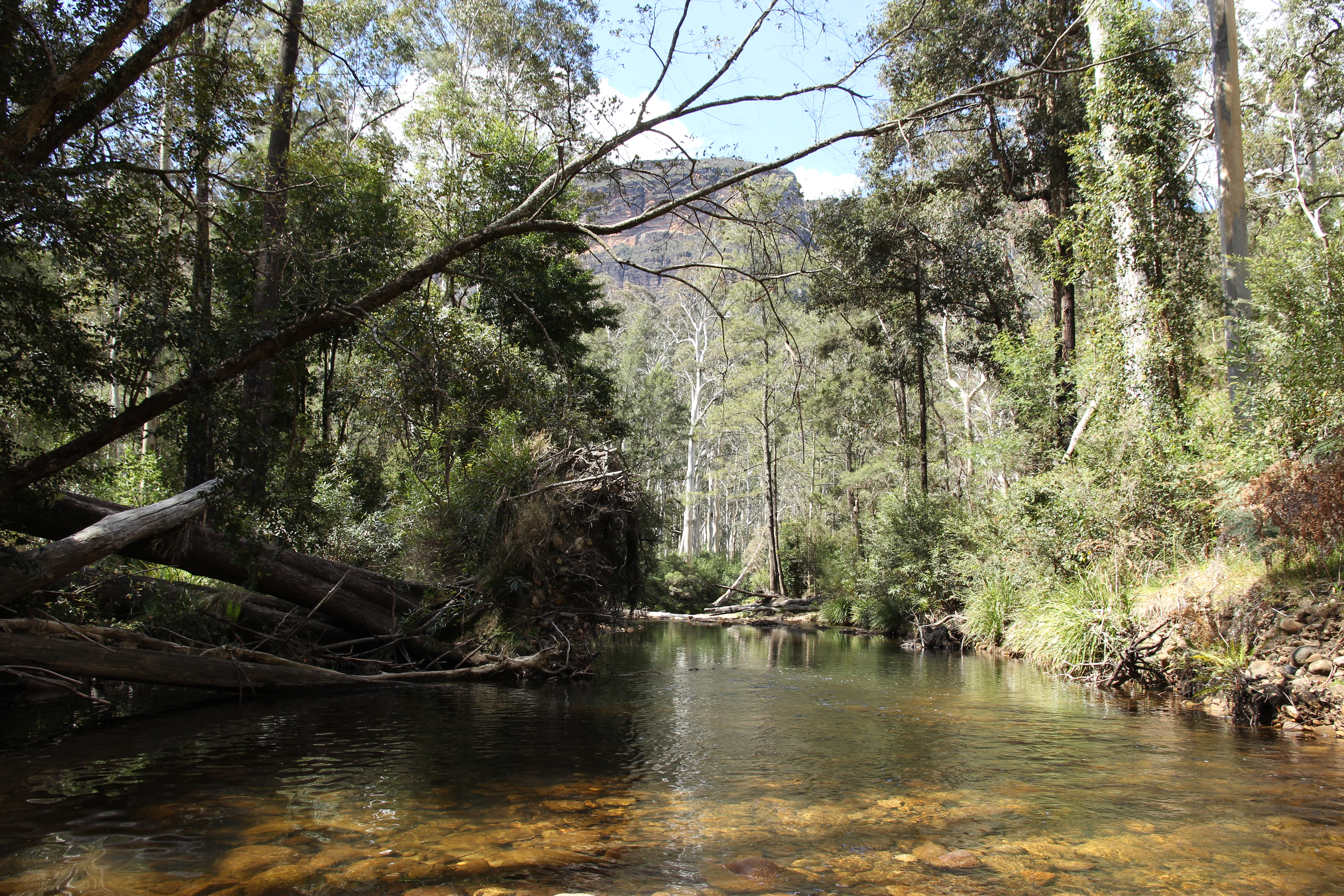
- Grose River, near Blue Gum Forest, 2012
- Etymology: In honour of Francis Grose

Location
- Country: Australia
- State: New South Wales
- Region: Sydney Basin (IBRA), Blue Mountains
- Local government areas: Blue Mountains, Hawkesbury

Physical characteristics
- Source: Blue Mountains
  - location: Mount Victoria
  - coordinates: 33°35′38″S 150°15′43″E
  - elevation: 953 m (3,127 ft)
- Mouth: confluence with Hawkesbury River
  - location: west of Agnes Banks
  - coordinates: 33°36′34″S 150°42′00″E
  - elevation: 2 m (6 ft 7 in)
- Length: 54 km (34 mi)

Basin features
- River system: Hawkesbury-Nepean catchment
- Tributaries
  - left: Burralow Creek
  - right: Wentworth Creek, Govetts Creek, Linden Creek
- Valley: Grose

The Grose River, a perennial river that is part of the Hawkesbury-Nepean catchment, is located in the Blue Mountains region of New South Wales, Australia.

== Course and features ==
The Grose River rises from north east of Mount Victoria within the Blue Mountains National Park, and flows through the Grose Valley and parts of the Greater Blue Mountains Area World Heritage Site, generally north, southeast, then east, joined by four tributaries, before reaching its confluence with the Hawkesbury River west of Agnes Banks. The river descends 952 metres (3,123 ft) over its 54-kilometre (34 mi) course.

Bushwalking is a popular activity and the best access method to the Grose River in its upper reaches. There are several well maintained walks that follow scenic sections of the river valley. One of the most popular is through the Blue Gum Forest, located at the junction of the Grose River and Govetts Creek.

The river was named in September 1793 in honour of Lieutenant Governor Francis Grose.

The Grose River subcatchment is located in the Hawkesbury–Nepean catchment. Over 80% of the subcatchment is reserved as part of Blue Mountains National Park. The tough heart of the Grose Valley and the early interest in preserving the area for its natural and recreational values have substantially limited disturbances. Major impacts from residential areas and industry have been confined to the ridges bordering the catchment. The Aboriginal sites and relics recorded from the area contribute to an understanding of Aboriginal lifestyles and occupation of the sandstone plateaus around Sydney.

== Grose Valley ==
The Grose Valley is a rugged valley, formed by the Grose River, the headwaters of which are in the Mount Victoria area. The valley is located between the Great Western Highway and Bells Line of Road, the two major routes across the Blue Mountains. The majority of the valley falls within the Blue Mountains National Park. The valley is popular for bushwalking and contains extensive wilderness areas. The river flows to the Nepean-Hawkesbury through an undisturbed environment for all but its final 5 kilometres (3.1 mi). Consequently, the Grose has substantial wild river values, as do its major tributaries such as Wentworth Creek and Carmarthen Brook. The river is known habitat for platypus and certain hanging swamps provide habitat for the endangered and endemic Blue Mountains water skink (Eulamprus leuraensis). The rocky sandstone complexes of the plateau provide habitat for some specialised and rare native animal species (e.g. the broad-headed snake, Hoplocephalus bungaroides). Woodland communities are habitat for mammals such as the red-necked swamp wallaby, brush-tailed rock wallaby and eastern pygmy possum.

== See also ==
- Evans Lookout
- List of rivers of Australia
- List of rivers of New South Wales (A–K)
- Myles Dunphy
- Perrys Lookdown
- Rivers of New South Wales
- Guide to Sydney Rivers site
