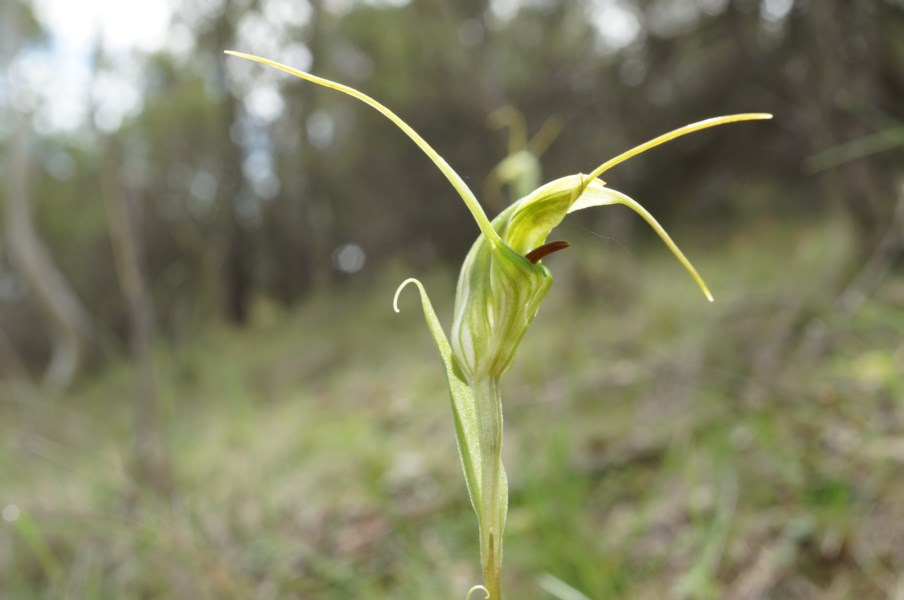
- On Mount Majura

Scientific classification
- Kingdom: Plantae
- Clade: Tracheophytes
- Clade: Angiosperms
- Clade: Monocots
- Order: Asparagales
- Family: Orchidaceae
- Subfamily: Orchidoideae
- Tribe: Cranichideae
- Genus: Pterostylis
- Species: P. laxa

Binomial name
- Pterostylis laxa Blackmore

Synonyms
- Diplodium laxum (Blackmore) D.L.Jones & M.A.Clem.

= Pterostylis laxa =

Antelope greenhood

Species of orchid

Pterostylis laxa, commonly known as antelope greenhood, is a species of orchid endemic to south-eastern Australia. As with similar greenhoods, the flowering plants differ from those which are not flowering. The non-flowering plants have a rosette of leaves flat on the ground but the flowering plants have a single flower with leaves on the flowering spike. This greenhood has green and white flowers with darker green or brown markings and a dorsal sepal with a long thread-like tip.

== Description ==
Pterostylis laxa is a terrestrial, perennial, deciduous, herb with an underground tuber and when not flowering, a rosette of 12 to 25 bright green, egg-shaped leaves lying flat on the ground, each leaf 5–25 mm (0.2–1 in) long and 8–16 mm (0.3–0.6 in) wide. Flowering plants have a single flower 18–25 mm (0.7–1 in) long and 9–12 mm (0.4–0.5 in) wide which leans slightly forwards on a flowering stem 200–400 mm (8–20 in) high with between three and five stem leaves. The flowers are green and white with darker green or brown markings. The dorsal sepal and petals are fused, forming a hood or "galea" over the column. The dorsal sepal has a thread-like tip 8–18 mm (0.3–0.7 in) long. The lateral sepals are erect or backswept, held closely against the galea, have thread-like tips 30–35 mm (1.2–1.4 in) long and a flat sinus with a central notch between their bases. The labellum is 10–13 mm (0.4–0.5 in) long, 2–4 mm (0.08–0.2 in) wide, dark-coloured, curved, pointed and visible above the sinus. Flowering occurs from January to April.

== Taxonomy and naming ==
Pterostylis laxa was first formally described in 1968 by John Blackmore from a specimen collected in the Upper Grose Valley. The description was published in The Orchadian. The specific epithet (laxa) is a Latin word meaning "loose" or "slack".

== Distribution and habitat ==
Antelope greenhood grows among grasses on slopes in forest in north-eastern Victoria and in eastern New South Wales as far north as the Northern Tablelands.
