= Grose Valley =

Valley in the Blue Mountains, New South Wales, Australia

Grose
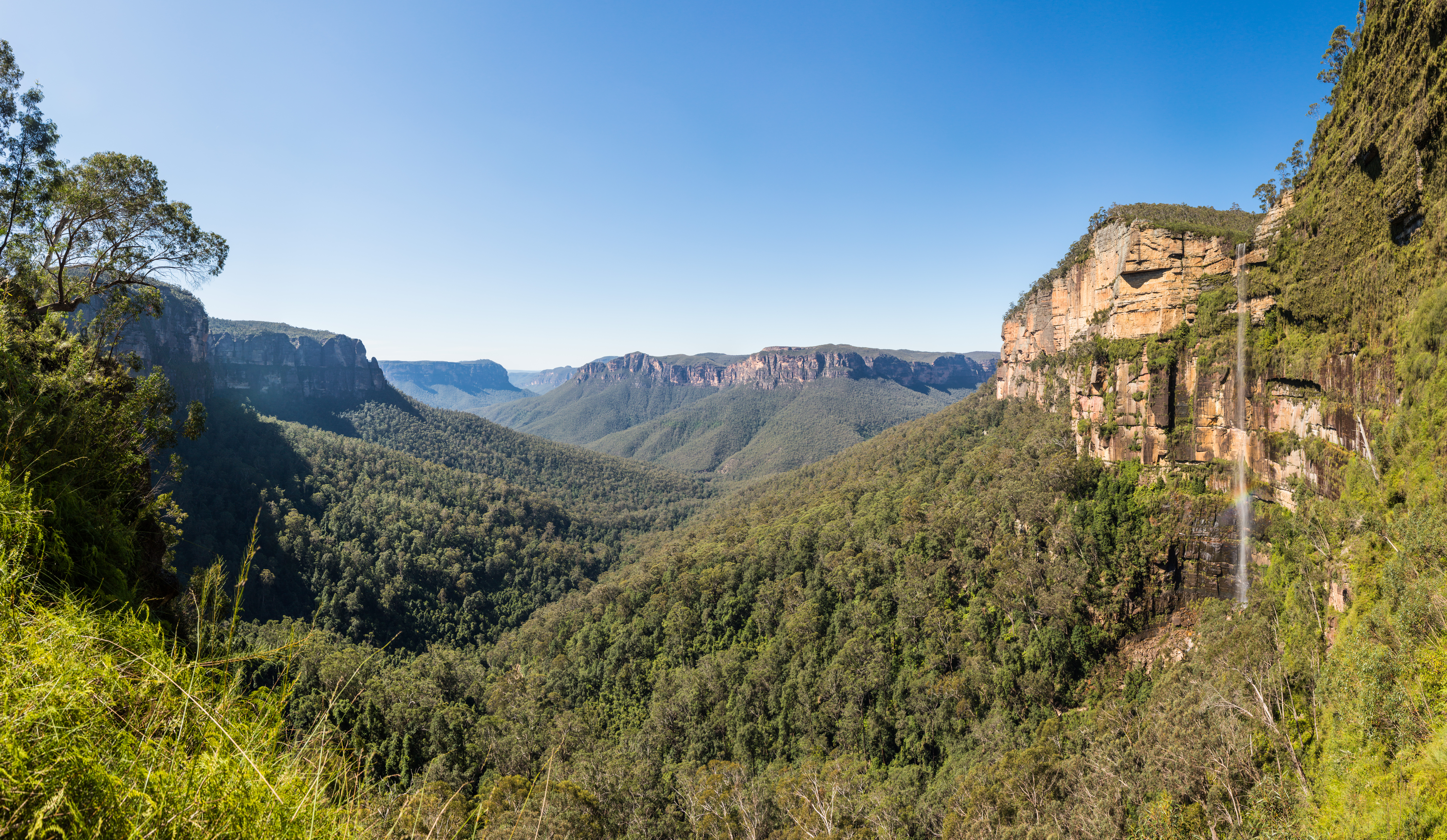
- View from Govetts Leap

- Location within New South Wales
- Area: 50,200 km^{2} (19,400 mi^{2})

Geography
- Country: Australia
- State: New South Wales
- Regions: Sydney Basin (IBRA); Blue Mountains
- Local government area: Blue Mountains
- Mountain range: Explorers Range, Great Dividing Range
- River: Grose River
- Interactive map of Grose

The Grose Valley, officially Grose Gorge is a rugged valley in the Blue Mountains, New South Wales, Australia. It has been formed by the Grose River, the headwaters of which are in the Mount Victoria area. The valley is located between the Great Western Highway and Bells Line of Road, the two major routes across the Blue Mountains. The majority of the valley falls within the Blue Mountains National Park.

== Grose wilderness features ==
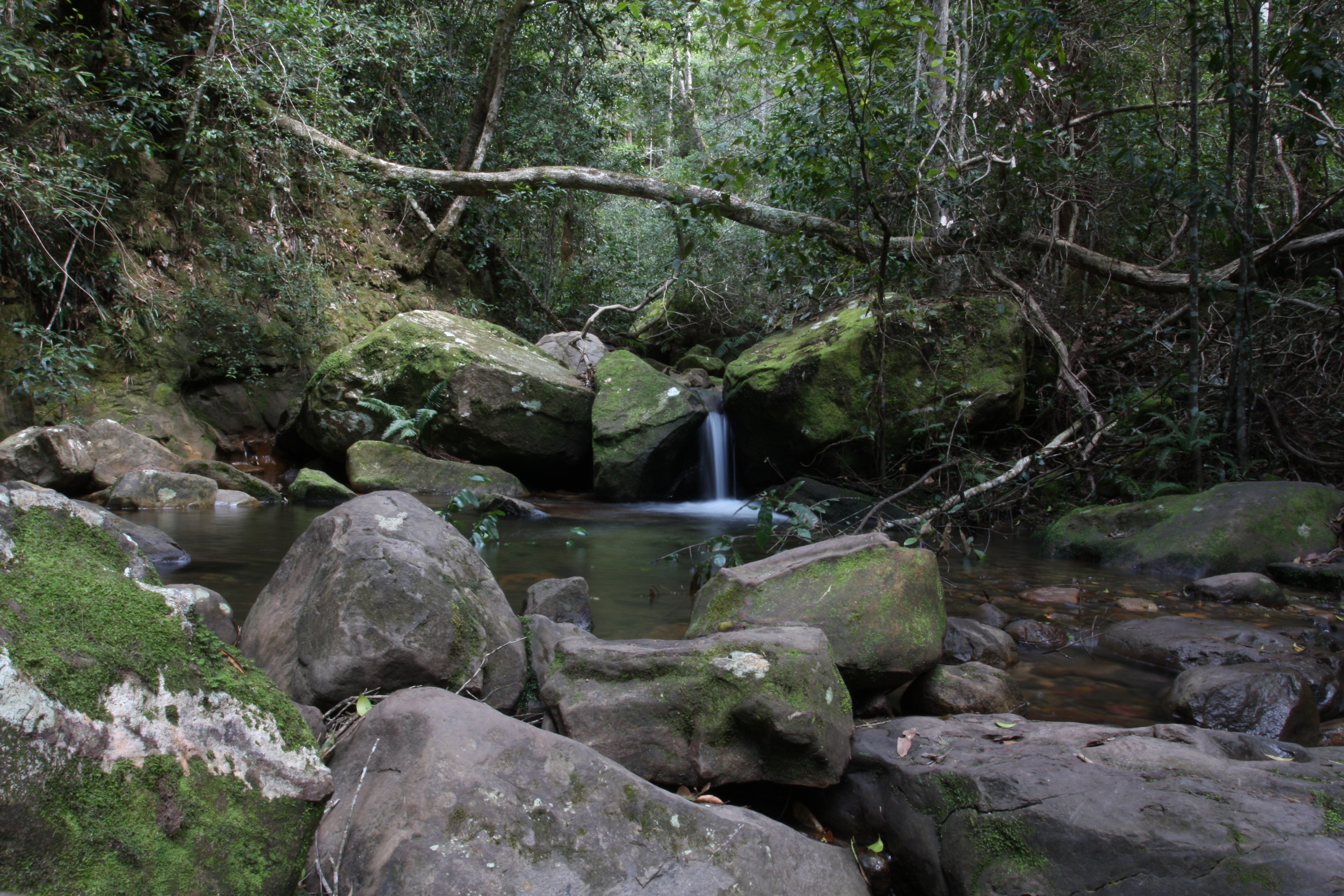
A stream in the Grose Valley.

The Grose Wilderness contains some of the most dramatic gorge and canyon landscapes of the entire Sydney basin sandstone region. The Grose also constitutes one of the most accessible wilderness areas for bushwalking or public observation from its escarpment margins.

=== Geology ===
The geology of the area consists of Triassic sandstones and underlying Permian sedimentary rocks. A number of basalt-capped peaks dominate the area, notably Mount Banks and Mount Hay. The Grose River and its tributaries have eroded an extensive labyrinth of gorges and canyons through the Hawkesbury (upper) and Narrabeen (lower) group sandstones, exposing cliffs of commonly over 200 metres (660 ft) and up to 510 metres (1,670 ft) in height (Banks Wall). The Burramoko Head sandstone in the upper and middle Grose gorges possesses weathering tendencies of breakage along vertical joints and has consequently yielded some of the sheerest cliff faces in the Blue Mountains. The wilderness contains 80% of the Grose River catchment. The river flows to the Nepean-Hawkesbury through an undisturbed environment for all but its final 5 kilometres (3.1 mi). Consequently, the Grose has substantial wild river values, as do its major tributaries such as Wentworth Creek and Carmarthen Brook.

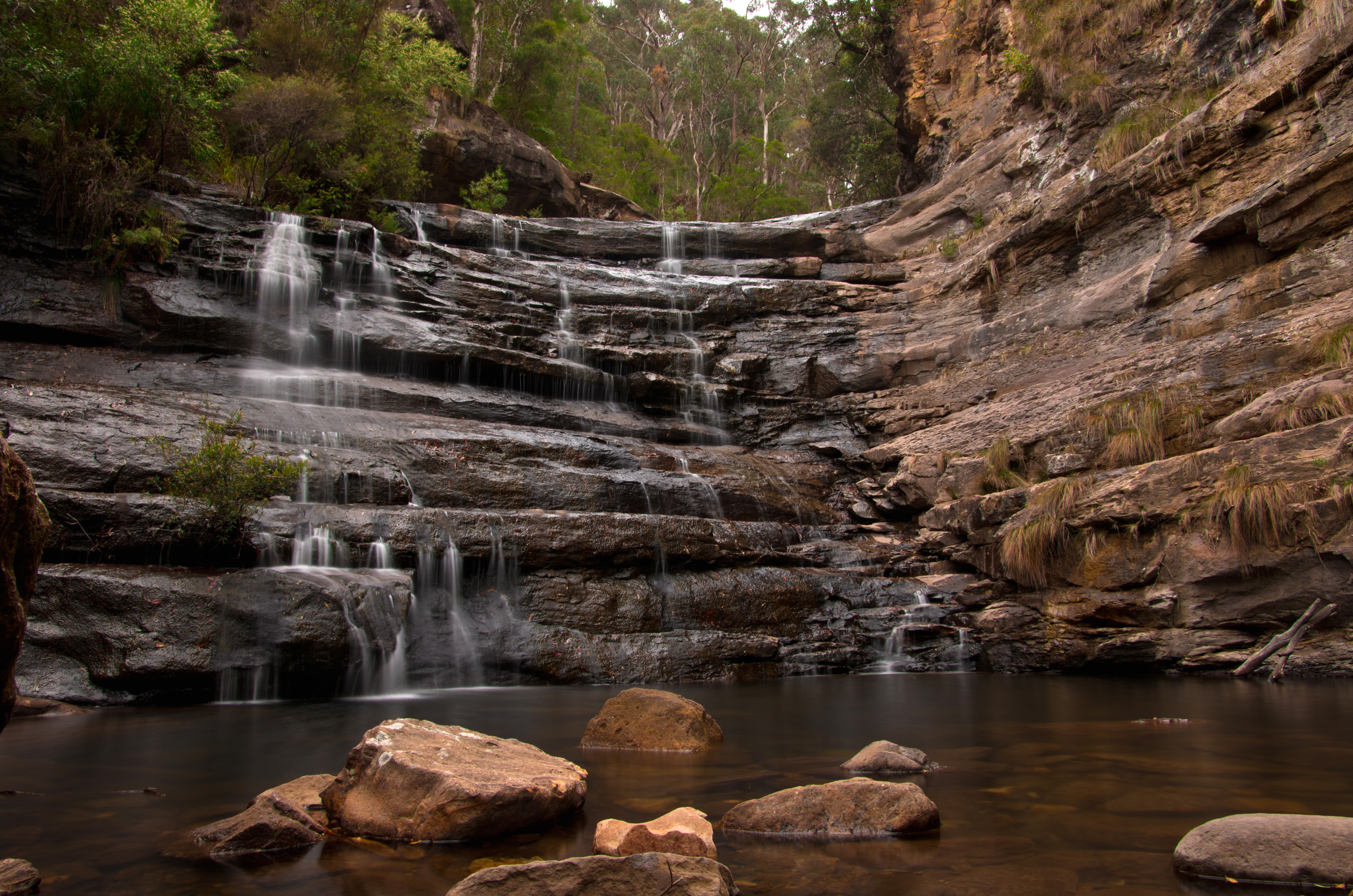
Silver Cascades on Victoria Creek in the Grose Valley, upstream from Victoria Falls.

=== Flora ===
The bulk of the vegetation in the wilderness is dry open forest and woodland, dominated by Eucalyptus sieberi and E. piperita above 800 metres (2,600 ft) altitude with Eucalyptus oblonga, E. globoidea, E. agglomerata and Angophora costata becoming dominant at lower altitudes. Plateau areas have thinner or waterlogged soils and generally support heath or low open woodland communities. Within the sheltered and well watered canyon environments closed forests commonly occur, with typical species being coachwood, sassafras and possumwood. On the isolated basalt caps the fertile soils support taller eucalypt forests of E. viminalis, E. blaxlandii and E. fastigata. A small area of alluvial sediments deposited in the upper Grose Valley during the Quaternary supports a tall moist open forest dominated by E. deanei, E. oreades, E. notabilis and E. cypelocarpa. The Blue Gum Forest is included in this forest type.

=== Fauna ===
The river is known habitat for platypus and certain hanging swamps provide habitat for the endangered and endemic Blue Mountains water skink (Eulamprus leuraensis). The rocky sandstone complexes of the plateau provide habitat for some specialised and rare native animal species (e.g. the broad-headed snake, Hoplocephalus bungaroides). Woodland communities are habitat for mammals such as the red-necked swamp wallaby, brush-tailed rock wallaby and eastern pygmy possum.

== History ==
=== Aboriginal history ===
Aboriginal artefacts have been found close to the Blue Gum Forest.

=== European history ===
The Grose River has cut a deep gorge through the area as it makes its way east towards the Hawkesbury River. Sheer sandstone cliffs standing hundreds of metres above the river make for spectacular scenery and can be viewed extensively from the Blackheath area, where there are a number of accessible lookouts, the best known being Govetts Leap. The valley can also be viewed from lookouts near Bells Line of Road and points outside Mount Victoria. It is named after Francis Grose.

Charles Darwin described the Grose Valley as "stupendous… magnificent" when he visited in 1836. In 1859 some of the first photographs in Australia were taken in the valley. At various times there were proposals for rail lines and dams but these have not proceeded. In 1931, the valley was the subject of one of Australia's first forest conservation battles.

Within the valley, the Blue Gum Forest is one place that stands out from the rest of the valley. It consists predominantly of towering Blue Gum trees (Eucalyptus deanei, also known as Deane's Gums, or Broad-leafed gums), with a thin understorey because the tall trees inhibit the growth of ground cover by blocking most of the sunlight. Protected by the Blue Mountains National Park, the forest can be accessed only on foot, with several trails from different parts of the Grose Valley and adjacent canyons meeting in the forest.

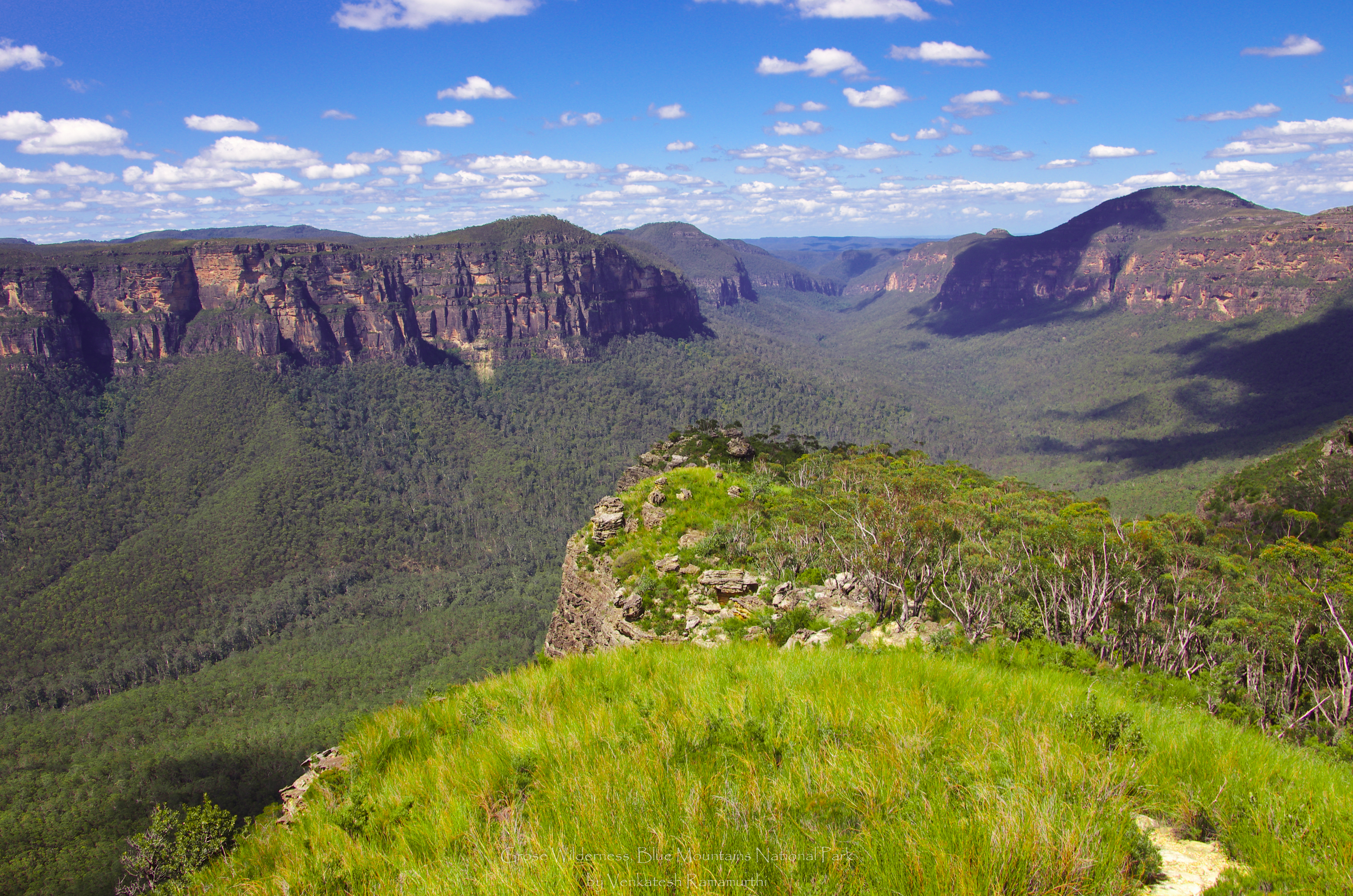
Grose Valley in Grose Wilderness.

== Bushwalking trails ==
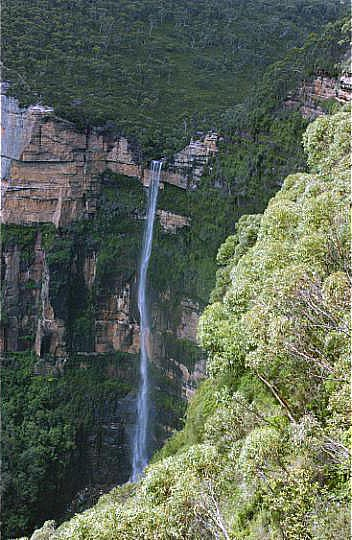
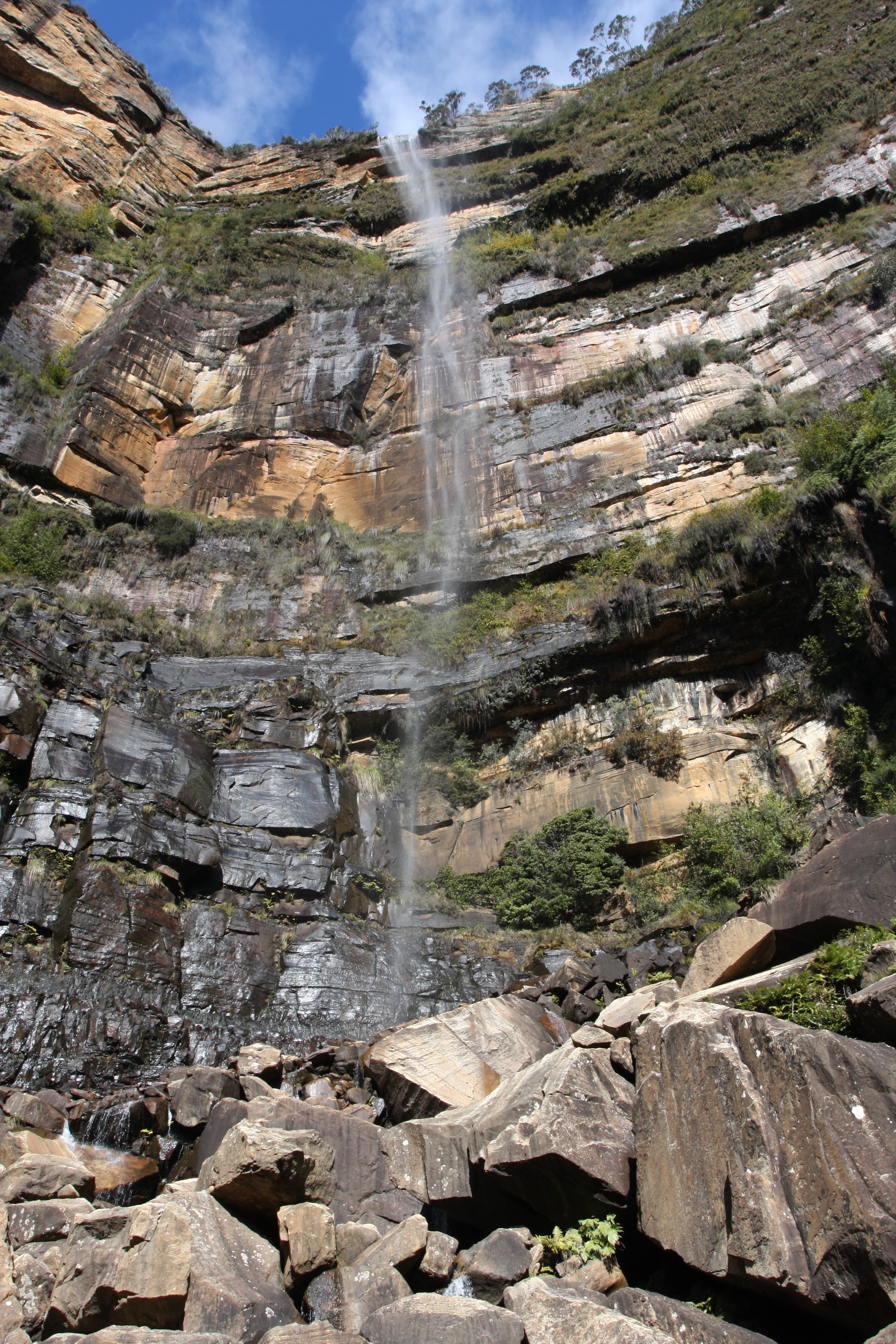
Govetts Leap, commonly known as Bridal Veil Falls

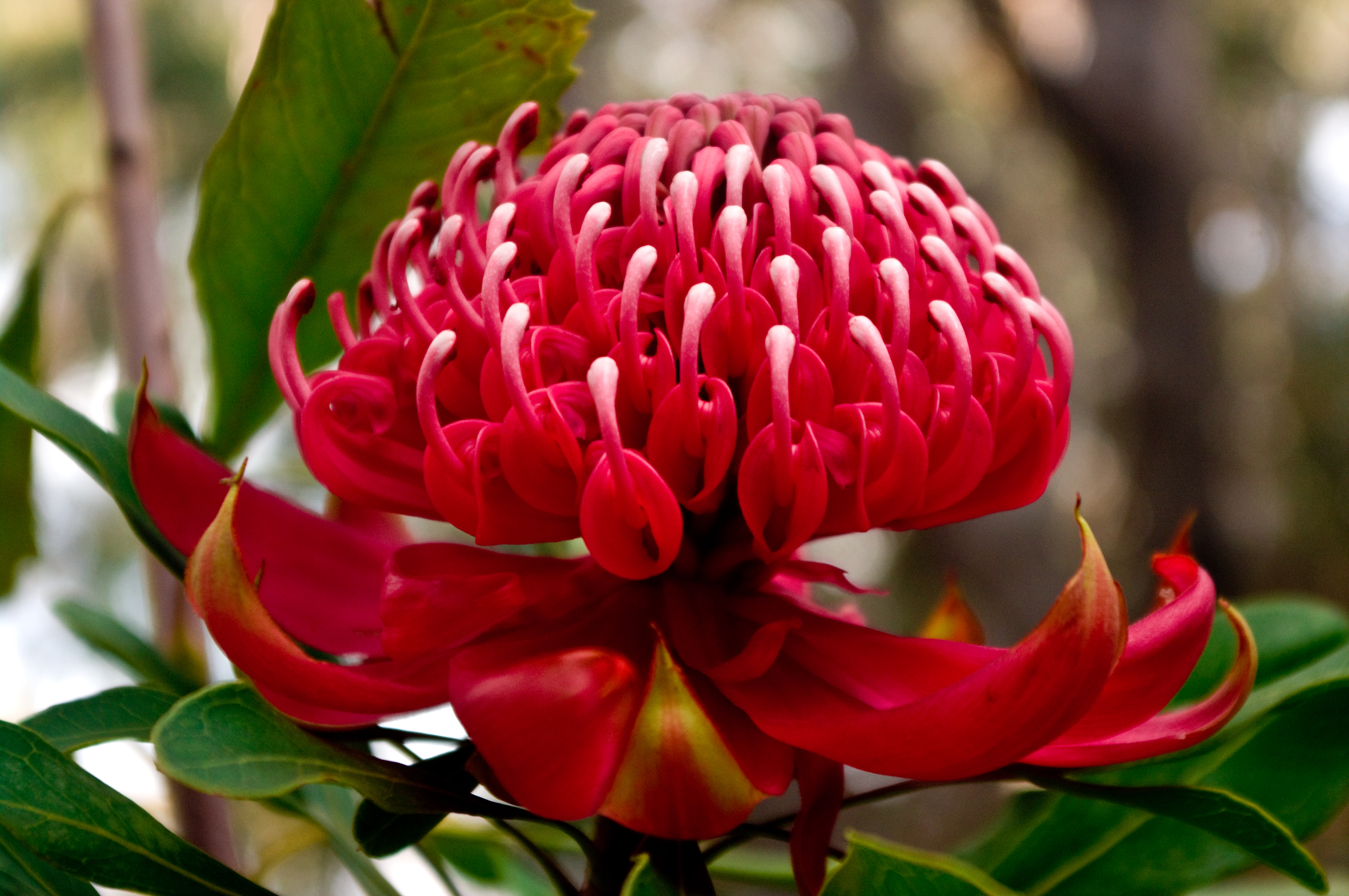
Waratah. A flower found in this region.

There are a number of walks through the valley, with various entry, exit points and valley arms offering a range of permutations to explore. A moderate-grade day walk covering approximately 10 kilometres (6 mi) in five hours starts at Perrys Lookdown and descends sharply to the valley floor. Crossing through a corner of the Blue Gum Forest, the track goes south through the Acacia Flat camp ground, following the Govetts Creek. Passing several abandoned campgrounds, the path forks at Junction Rock; the route to Govetts Leap was closed in October 2003, following a landslide, reopened in December 2007, and closed again since 2020.

In the other direction, along Govetts Creek, the route then starts a continuous climb towards the Grand Canyon, where it forks again; a closed track goes to Neates Glen, while the other is a steep climb to Evans Lookout. The general direction of travel is towards the southeast and this direction is recommended as the final climb at Evans Lookout is in the shade in the afternoon. Creeks in the valley are seasonal, the water is unsafe to drink. The walk is much more strenuous in summer due to the higher daily temperatures and the added risk of bushfires.

The valley has been affected by bushfires at various times, notably in 1982, 2006, and 2020. In particular the Blue Gum Forest was damaged by back burning. Owing to the harsh bushfires in 2006 and 2020, the Blue Gum forest and other walking tracks in the valley were closed to bushwalkers to allow the regrowth of vegetation. Since 2020, Govetts Leap descent and Rodriguez Pass are semi-permanently closed due to landslides. The remaining access points to the valley include the Horse Track, Pierces Pass, Lockleys Pylon, Perrys Lookdown, and Victoria Falls.

== Conservation ==
The Grose Valley arguably became the cradle of the modern conservation movement in NSW when Blue Gum Forest was saved from threatened destruction in 1931-32. A group from the Sydney Bush Walkers club, led by Alan Rigby, were camped in the forest when they chanced upon a Bilpin farmer, Clarrie Hungerford. Hungerford had a lease of the forest and told the bushwalkers he planned to clear the blue gums to plant walnuts. The bushwalkers went away and started a campaign to stop him. Eventually, they raised £130 which they paid Hungerford in exchange for his relinquishing the lease. It was a substantial amount at the height of the great depression. 80 pounds came in the form of an interest-free loan from James Cleary, then head of the NSW railways and subsequently chairman of the Australian Broadcasting Commission. Cleary was also a bushwalker.

One of the key activists in the campaign was Myles Dunphy, who at the time was developing his plans for the Blue Mountains National Park.

During the 1800s there were various proposals to dam the Grose Valley, and one such dam would have been at the forest. The area was also the subject of a number of proposed coal and shale mining ventures, and in the 1850s it was planned that the main western railway line would be routed up the Grose River and through the forest.

In 1875 Blue Gum Forest was the scene of an artists' camp established by Eccleston Du Faur, of the Academy of Art. Several magnificent photographs by Joseph Philip Bischoff and drawings and paintings by William Piguenit resulted. Another outcome was that the whole Grose Valley and surrounds was reserved from alienation because it was 'a national spectacle'. At the time there was no national park in Australia, and indeed Australia was not even a nation—but the reservation in essence was the country’s first national park.

== Gallery ==
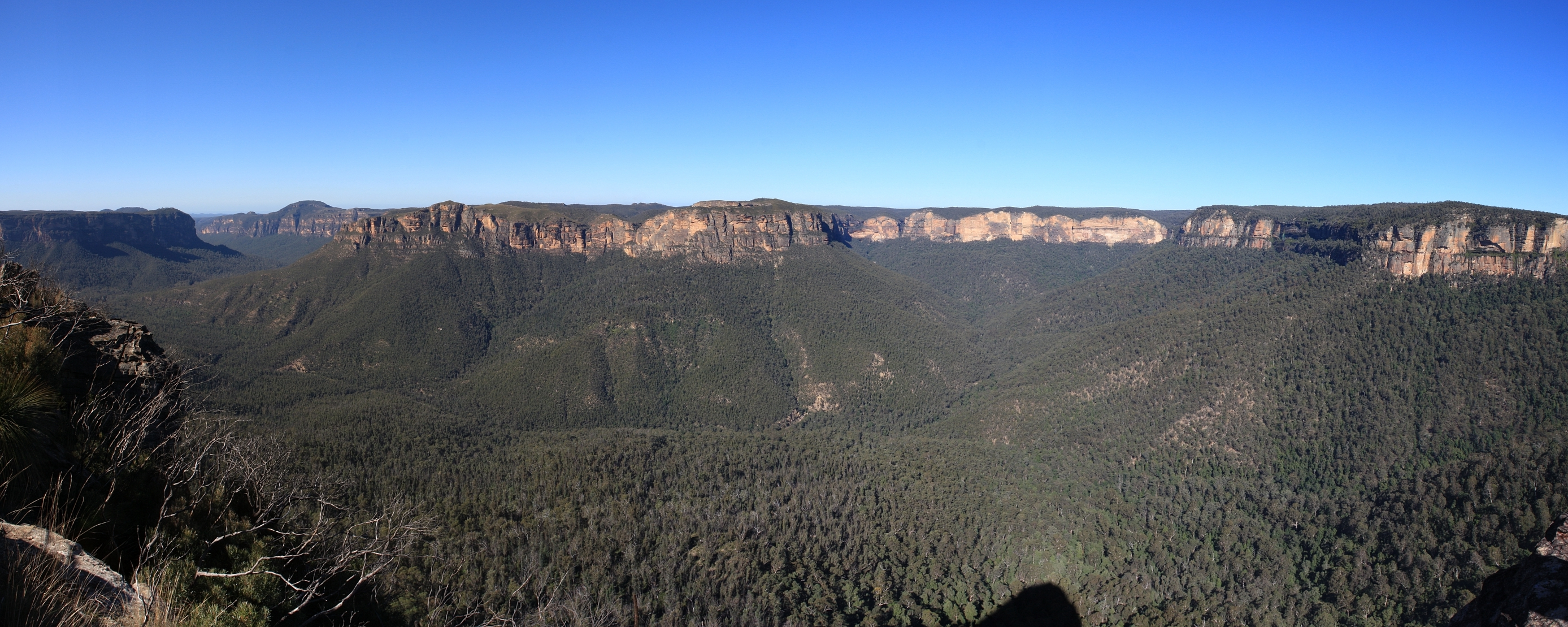
Grose Valley seen from Pulpit Rock, Blackheath

== Major tracks ==
The Blue Mountains National Park contains the following heritage-listed major walking tracks:

- Blue Mountains walking tracks

- Blue Gum Forest to Burra Korain Flat
- Blue Gum Forest to Perrys Lookdown
- Burra Korain Flat to Victoria Falls Lookout
- Govetts Leap to Evans Lookout (Clifftop Track)
- Govetts Leap to Junction Rock (Rodriguez Pass)
- Junction Rock to Blue Gum Forest
- Blue Gum Forest to Mount Hay Road (Lockley Track)
- Mount Hay Track
- Neates Glen to Evans Lookout (Grand Canyon Track)
- Evans Lookout to Junction Rock (Rodriguez Pass)

== Major lookouts ==
- 33°35′44″S 150°20′22″E - Anvil Rock
- 33°35′04″S 150°18′52″E - Baltzer Lookout
- 33°38′49″S 150°19′36″E - Evans Lookout
- 33°37′41″S 150°18′41″E - Govetts Leap Lookout
- 33°36′00″S 150°21′36″E - Grose Valley
- 33°37′39″S 150°21′26″E - Lockley Pylon
- 33°35′05″S 150°22′06″E - Mount Banks
- 33°36′01″S 150°20′49″E - Perrys Lookdown
- 33°39′19″S 150°19′43″E - Point Pilcher
- 33°37′15″S 150°19′40″E - Pulpit Rock Lookout
- 33°34′21″S 150°20′23″E - Walls Lookout
- 33°34′24″S 150°17′37″E - Victoria Falls Lookout

== See also ==
- List of Blue Mountains articles

Map
