= Blue Gum Forest =

Protected forest in New South Wales, Australia

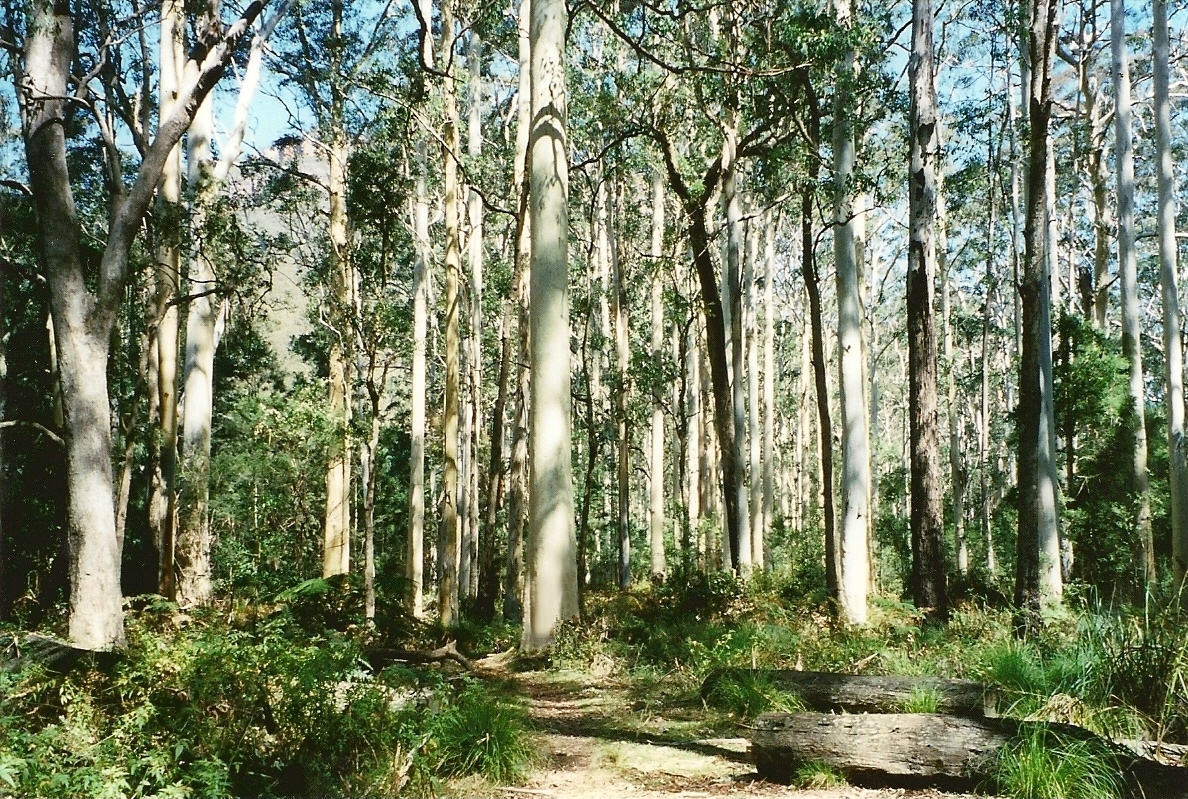
- Blue gums at the Blue Gum Forest

- Location within New South Wales

Geography
- Location: Australia
- Coordinates: 33°36.45′S 150°21.48′E

Administration
- Authority: NSW National Parks & Wildlife Service
- Website: www.nationalparks.nsw.gov.au/things-to-do/historic-buildings-places/blue-gum-forest

The Blue Gum Forest is a forest located in Blue Mountains National Park within the Grose Valley of the Blue Mountains in New South Wales west of Sydney, southeastern Australia. It is one of the best-known bushwalking sites in Australia. The forest is located within the UNESCO World Heritage Site known as the Greater Blue Mountains Area. The forest survived through the efforts of early Australian conservationists.

== Natural history ==
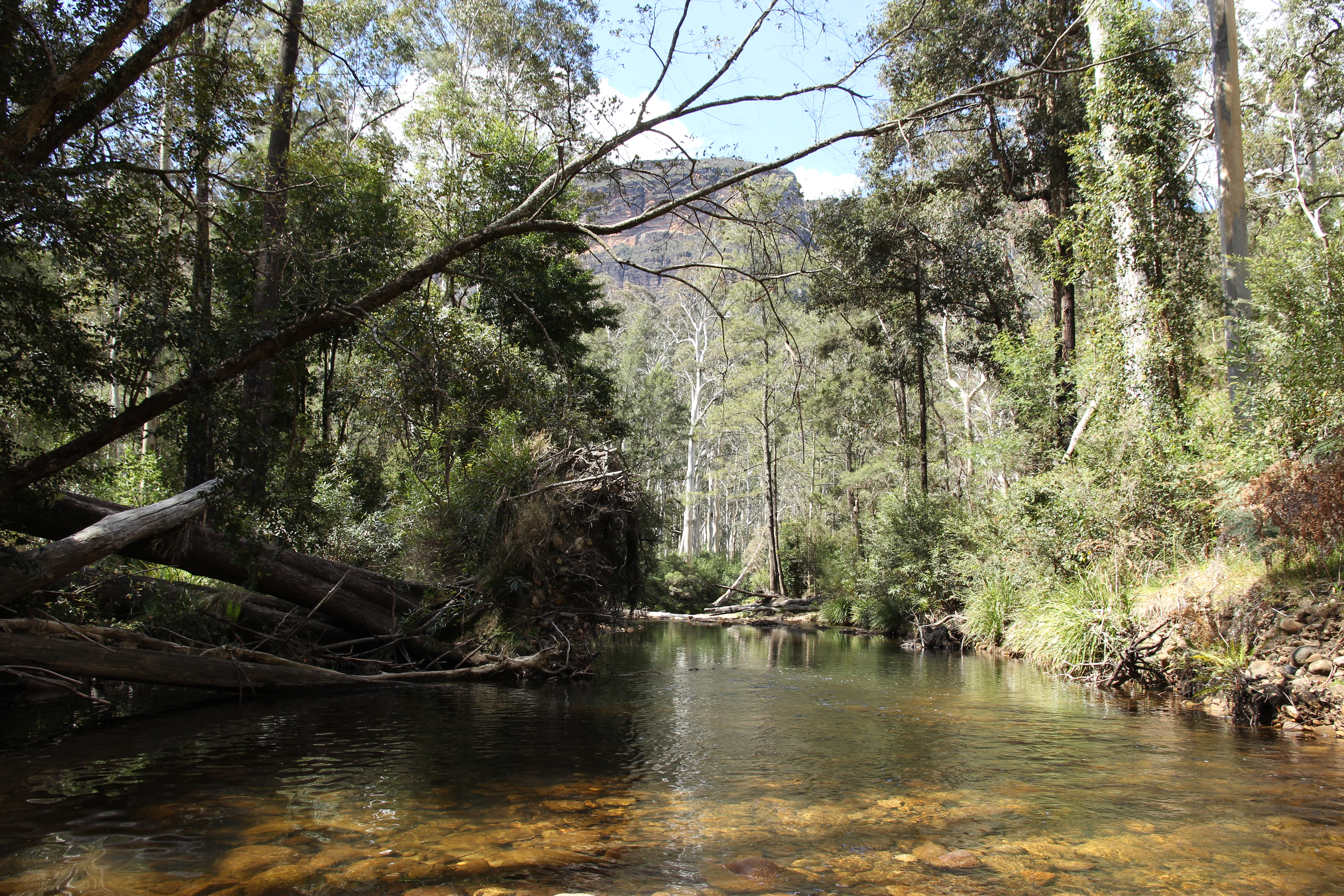
Grose River, near the Blue Gum Forest.

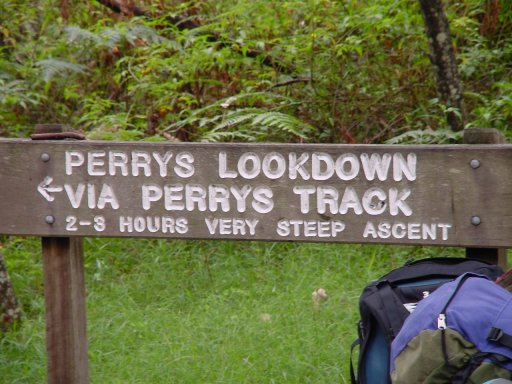
A sign on the Perrys Lookdown track at the Blue Gum Forest.

The forest consists predominantly of towering Mountain blue gum (Eucalyptus deanei) trees, with an understory of shrubs. The forest can be accessed only on foot, with several trails from different parts of the Grose Valley and adjacent canyons meeting in the forest. The most direct route into the forest from Blackheath is by the Perrys Lookdown track, which descends 656 metres (2,152 ft) to the forest. The return walk uphill is rated as "hard".

A large mountain blue gum tree measuring 65 metres (213 ft) high with a trunk 6 metres (20 ft) in circumference grows in the Blue Gum Forest. Being over 600 years old, it is a local landmark for bushwalkers. Because of the effects of trampling, camping is permitted at nearby Acacia Flat, not in the Blue Gum Forest itself.

=== Flora ===
While the forest is dominated by Eucalyptus deanei, other eucalyptus trees are present. Smaller trees and shrubs include paperbarks (Melaleuca styphelioides), various acacias and the Yellow Pittosporum (Pittosporum revolutum). Grasses, vines, orchids (Caladenia picta), and ferns grow on the forest floor.

=== Fauna ===
Common brushtail possums, greater gliders, eastern grey kangaroos, spotted-tail quoll and rock wallabies are some of the many mammal species in the forest. Birds are often encountered, either at the forest floor or in and above the canopy. Parrots such as the crimson rosella and yellow-tailed black cockatoo are conspicuous.

=== Fire ===
Most of the trees are considered to be around 300 years old, possibly originating from a large bush fire. Regular light or moderate fires promote eucalyptus regeneration and stop the invasion of rainforest trees, but severe fires damage the forest. The Grose Valley has been affected by bushfires at various times, notably in 1982 and in November 2006. In particular the Blue Gum Forest was damaged by back burning. Following the harsh bushfires in 2006, the Blue Gum Forest and other walking tracks in the valley were closed to bushwalkers to allow the regrowth of vegetation.

== History ==
=== Indigenous Australians ===
In 1804, the explorer George Caley climbed nearby Mount Banks, and noticed camp fires from Indigenous Australians. The Blue Mountains was part of the territories of the Darug people. There is also evidence of associations of the more westerly Wiradjuri and the southern Gandangara people with the Blue Mountains. Aboriginal tool-making and signs of occupation have been found in the Grose Valley, some of it close to the Blue Gum Forest.

=== 1850s and 1860s ===
In around 1858, the Royal Engineers built 70 kilometres (43 mi) of bridle track for the proposed railway line. However, this was abandoned in favour of the current line on the ridge. The Engineers Track, as it was known, became a navigational point for walkers, farmers and explorers. Robert Hunt took some of the earliest Australian photographs in the forest in 1859. Ben Carver, a cattle rustler, also used the track in the 1860s, and later bought a lease on the area in 1875. Only a small section of the Engineers Track survives today.

=== Artist's camp and the Horderns ===
In 1875, the Blue Gum Forest was the scene of an artists' camp established by Frederick Eccleston Du Faur of the Academy of Art. Over twenty artists, photographers and academics camped in the forest. Several photographs by Alex Bischoff, and drawings and paintings by William Piguenit resulted. Another outcome was that the whole Grose Valley and surrounds was reserved from alienation because it was 'a national spectacle'. At the time there was no national park in Australia, and indeed Australia was not even a nation—but the reservation was the country's first "national park". However, this reservation status did not stop subsequent threats to the forest. The wealthy retail family the Horderns purchased a lease in the Blue Gum Forest, though they had no plans to develop the area. Jokingly, this part of the valley was known as "the Hordern Pavilion".

=== Early conservation ===
The Grose Valley became the cradle of the modern conservation movement in New South Wales when the Blue Gum Forest was saved from threatened destruction in 1931–32. At Easter in 1931, a group from the Sydney Bush Walkers Club, led by Alan Rigby, were camped in the forest when they chanced upon a Bilpin farmer, Clarrie Hungerford. Hungerford had a lease of the forest and told the bushwalkers he planned to clear the blue gums to plant walnuts. Other threats to the forest included a proposed railway line, a dam, a power station and mining for coal and shale.

The bushwalkers went away and started a campaign to stop him. Eventually, they raised A£130 which they paid Hungerford in exchange for his relinquishing the lease. They met with Hungerford at the Blue Gum Forest on 15 November 1931 in pouring rain, and he agreed with their suggestion. It was a substantial amount at the height of the Great Depression. A£80 came in the form of an interest-free loan from James Cleary, then head of the NSW railways and later chairman of the Australian Broadcasting Commission. Cleary was also a bushwalker. One of the key activists in the campaign was Myles Dunphy, who at the time was developing his plans for the Blue Mountains National Park.

=== 2026 death ===
On Tuesday, 27 January 2026, two teenage boys, aged 16 and 17 respectively, became separated near Blue Gum Forest and Acacia Flat campground. Both had gone on a three-day "camping adventure" together that had them travel from Emu Plains to Leura on the Blue Mountains Line, then Mount Hay, and finally Acacia Flat campground. Shortly after descending from Mount Hay down to the Grose Valley, they were getting close to Acacia Flat campground, when the 16-year-old disappeared. A camper walking with the duo had reported that the 16-year-old had apparently dropped something, then ran into the bushes in an attempt to retrieve the object. The 17-year-old walked further down the track looking for him and found his companion's backpack alone. The 17-year-old then walked off the trail, trying to find his companion. After several hours, he realised he was getting lost and at 5:45 pm, shortly after 6 pm, he activated his personal locater beacon. Rescue helicopters and emergency personnel came to the scene, and the 17-year-old was winched out near Acacia Flat campground.

Emergency services then started to search for the 16-year-old. The search involved multiple agencies, including the Blue Mountains Rescue Squad and the Toll Rescue Helicopter. The search commenced for two days, until the body of the 16-year-old was located in a creek near the forest at approximately 1 pm on Thursday, 29 January.

It has been declared that police will conduct a post-mortem examination of the body of the 16-year-old, as well as a coronial investigation.

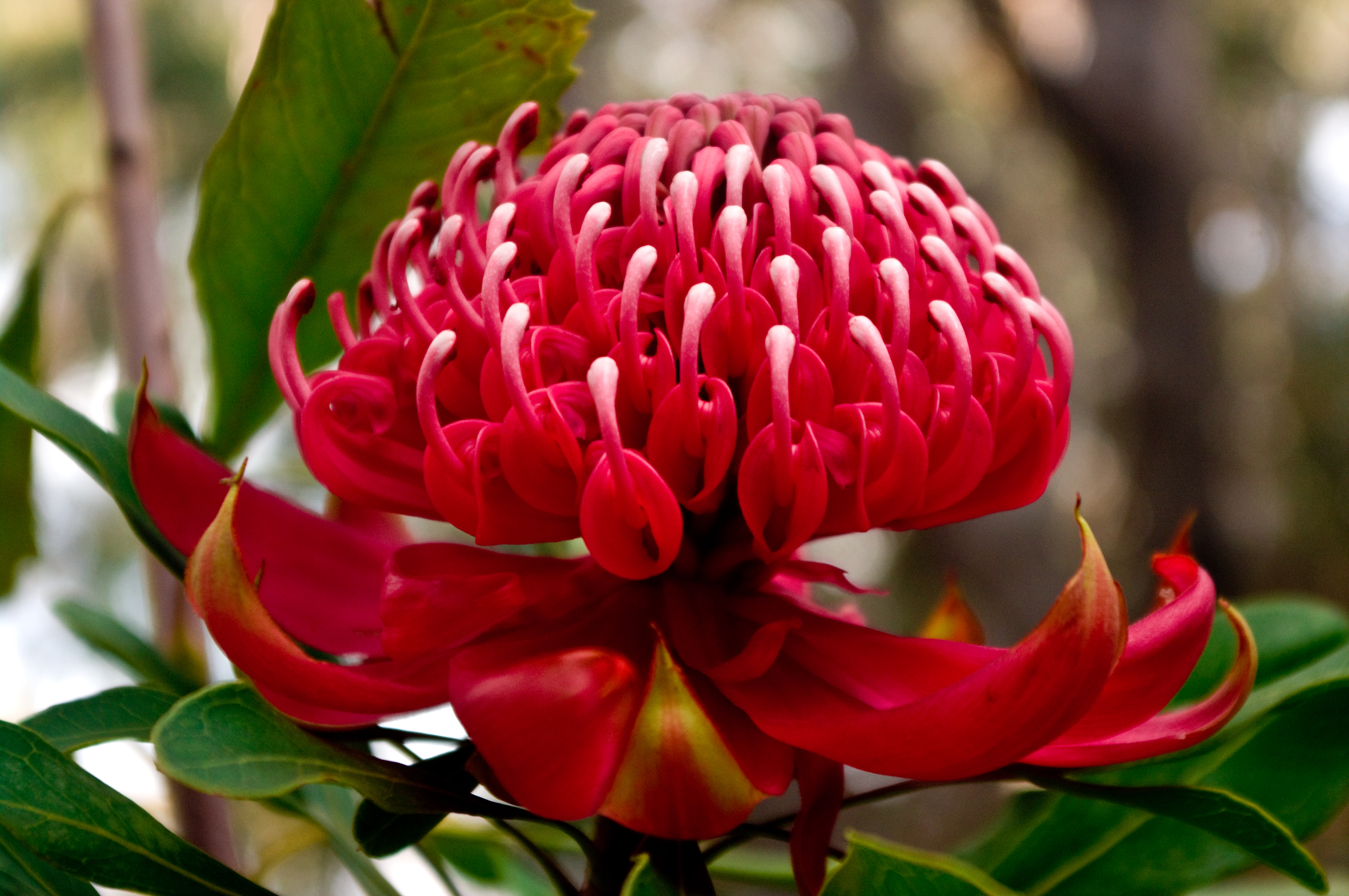
Waratah in Blue Gum Forest from Pierces Pass in Blue Mountains National Park.

== See also ==
- Protected areas of New South Wales
- Blue Mountains walking tracks
