= Blue Mountains walking tracks =

Heritage-listed walking tracks and picnic/rest areas in the Blue Mountains

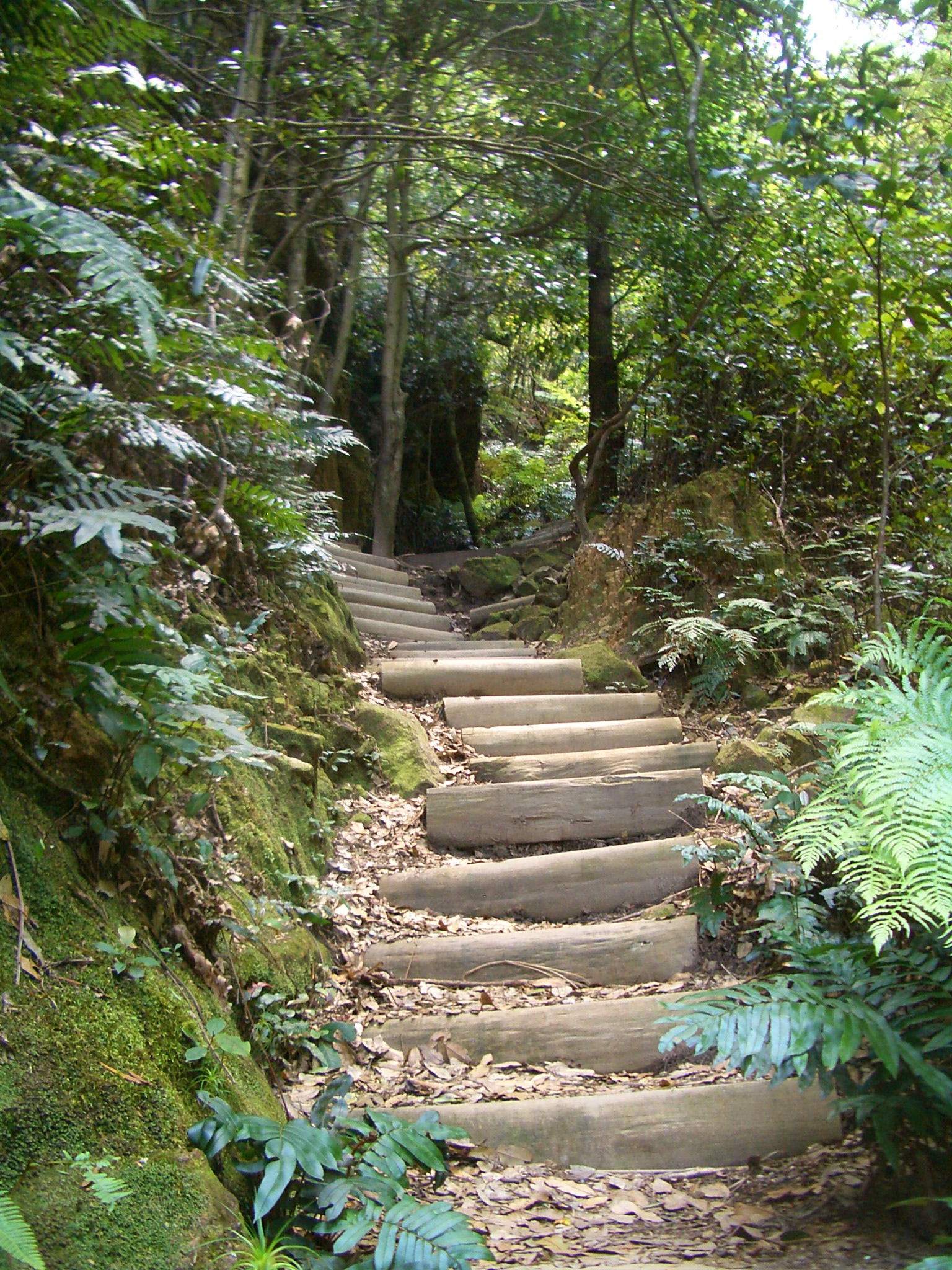
- Steps in the Six Foot Track, pictured in 2007.

- Location within New South Wales Location within Australia
- 33°38′11″S 150°16′18″E
- Location: Blue Mountains National Park, City of Blue Mountains, New South Wales, Australia

History
- Built: 1880–

Site notes
- Owner: NSW Office of Environment and Heritage

New South Wales Heritage Register
- Official name: Blue Mountains Walking tracks
- Type: State heritage (complex / group)
- Designated: 2 April 1999
- Reference no.: 980
- Type: Trail/Track
- Category: Transport – Land

The Blue Mountains walking tracks are heritage-listed picnic areas, walking tracks and rest areas located in the Blue Mountains National Park, west of Sydney in New South Wales, Australia. They were built from 1880 onwards. The property is owned by the NSW Office of Environment and Heritage, an agency of the Government of New South Wales. The facilities were added to the New South Wales State Heritage Register on 2 April 1999.

== History ==
The Blue Mountains National Park regained the top spot as the most popular New South Wales national park for domestic visitors in a 2014 survey. It received 4.2 million visitors in 2014, relegating Royal National Park to second place.

== Description ==
The following walking tracks form part of the heritage-listed items. The State Heritage Inventory (SHI) number below is the reference to the item number in the NSW National Parks and Wildlife Service (NPWS) s.170 Register.

Tab No.	SHI No.	Item name	Location	Image
1	3900010	Causeway to Red Hands Cave	Glenbrook	
2	3900033	Grotto Tracks	Springwood	
3	3900043	Florabella Pass	Warrimoo and Blaxland	
4	3900048	Kings Cave Track	Linden	
5	3900088	Princes Rock Track	Wentworth Falls	
6	3900099	Den Fenella Track	Wentworth Falls	
7	3900112	Jamison Creek Corridor/Darwins Walk	Wentworth Falls	
8	3900115	Valley of the Waters Track	Wentworth Falls	
9	3900120	National Pass	Wentworth Falls	
10	3900138	Federal Pass	Katoomba/Leura	
11	3900140	Giant Stairway	Katoomba	
12	3900152	Orphan Rock Track [closed]	Katoomba	
13	3900153	Prince Henry Cliff Walk	Katoomba/Leura	
14	3900157	Track from Lilianfels Park to Lady Darleys Lookout	Katoomba	
15	3900197	O'Sullivan's Road	Katoomba	
16	3900215	Grand Canyon Track	Blackheath	
17	3900217	Point Pilcher Track	Blackheath/Medlow Bath	
18	3900223	Perrys Lookdown to Blue Gum Forest	Blackheath	
19	3900232	Engineers Track	Grose Valley (Darling Causeway to Nepean River)	
20	3900241	Bruce's Walk	Lawson to Mount Victoria	
21	3900247	Six Foot Track	Katoomba to Jenolan Caves	
22	3900272	Lawsons Long Alley	Mount Victoria	
23	3900273	Lockyers Road	Mount Victoria	
24	3900276	Berghofers Pass	Mount Victoria	
25	3900277	Section of Bells Line of Road	Mount Tomah	
26	3900282	Kanangra Walls Cattle Track	Oberon	
27	3900320	Megalong Valley Aboriginal Routes	Katoomba	
28	3900321	Mount Victoria Escarpment Complex	Mount Victoria	
29	3900328	Mount York Roads Complex	Mount Victoria	
30	3900329	Wentworth Falls Complex	Wentworth Falls	
31	3900330	Cox's Road Complex	Faulconbridge to Mount York	
32	3900331	Parkes Garden Tracks Complex	Faulconbridge	
33	3900332	Wolgan Railway Complex	Newnes railway which is now a rail trail	
34	3900333	Upper Grose Valley Aboriginal Passes – Complex	Blackheath	
35	3900334	Track to Base of Govetts Leap – Complex	Blackheath	
36	3900335	Tracks to Ruined Castle – Complex	Katoomba	
37	3900336	Grose Valley Cliff Edge – Complex	Blackheath	

== Heritage listing ==
As at 16 January 2017, the overall complex of Blue Mountains regional walking tracks was of National significance. It is distributed among dozens of individually designed cultural landscapes. These landscapes were planned for recreational purposes, at first by wealthy gentlemen on their private estates and later by community based trusts who administered grants from the NSW Government. There exists a full range of original construction types and track fabric and associated features such as shelter sheds, wells, railings and signage from the 1870s private tracks to the efforts of the Blue Mountains National Park Trust in the 1960s.

The blending of man-made and natural features in track construction was done in ways that reflect the aesthetics, technology and environmental values of the time. Many of the constructed features transcend their purely utilitarian functions and have considerable aesthetic appeal. The solutions of the early trustees and track makers to complex problems of design, particularly drainage issues and the use of stone have significant research value today. Due to the proximity of the reserves to Sydney and the early provision of mass transport links between Sydney and the Blue Mountains, the region's walking tracks have been the most significant facilitators of contact between urban Australians and the natural environment.

The Blue Mountains tourist industry grew largely to service people who desired an engagement with nature on the walking tracks. The tracks have been an important factor in the growth of conservation values in the community. Walkers have left a resource of written records, photographs and memories recording their impressions and emotional and spiritual experiences on the tracks that has historic significance as a record of Australians' changing relationships with nature. These relationships continue to evolve after over 100 years of continuous use of many tracks. People walking the tracks today can enjoy feelings of continuity and empathy with the walkers of the past as they use the same historic structures.

Blue Mountains walking tracks was listed on the New South Wales State Heritage Register on 2 April 1999.

== See also ==
- Greater Blue Mountains Area
