= William Romaine Govett =

English painter

- Born: 3 October 1807; Tiverton in Devon
- Died: 22 August 1848 (aged 40); London

William Romaine Govett (3 October 1807 – 22 August 1848) was a painter and assistant surveyor in the Surveyor-General's Department of New South Wales after whom Govetts Leap was named.

== Background ==
Govett was born at Tiverton in Devon and educated at Blundell's School.

He was appointed assistant surveyor in the Surveyor-General's Department of New South Wales on 10 July 1827 and reached Sydney in December 1828. Part of his work included surveying on the old Bathurst road, during which he discovered Govett's Leap in the Blue Mountains, which was named in his honour by the Surveyor-General of New South Wales (Major Sir Thomas Livingstone Mitchell).

Mitchell described Govett in his report on the department in 1832 as a 'wild young man who needed control, who had come to the colony ignorant of surveying but with much natural talent had become perhaps the ablest delineator of ground in the department, and who was remarkably clever at dealing with unexplored country'.

Govett was sent to the Hawkesbury River in February 1829, where many farms required measurement, but in 1833 his career ended abruptly when the department was reduced. Govett returned to England in March 1834 with a letter of recommendation from Mitchell to the British government.

After his return to England Govett lived at Tiverton, where he wrote several articles on New South Wales which were published in The Saturday Magazine between 7 May 1836 and 2 September 1837 under the title Sketches of New South Wales. They dealt with such topics as the nature of the country he had helped to survey, the habits of the Aboriginals, and life in Sydney; they were illustrated with twelve paintings by Govett, which were later advertised for sale by G. Michelmore & Co. William Romaine Govett England and Wales, Marriage Registration Index, 1837–1920 marriage: 1838 Tiverton, Devon, England other: Elizabeth Ann Tanner Govett seems to have undergone a personal crisis after his return and considered going abroad again to make a fresh start but died on 22 August 1848 in London.

The State Library of New South Wales holds a portrait of Govett by an unknown artist (Reference GPO 1 – 18552).

== Bibliography ==
Gentleman's Magazine, 1848; Sydney Gazette, 17 Sept, 28 Dec 1827; Australian, 7 Mar 1834; Truth (Sydney), 2 Feb 1919, 10 Apr 1927; W. R. Govett, Scrapiana (State Library of New South Wales); W. R. Govett, notes and sketches (State Library of New South Wales); manuscript catalogue under Govett (State Library of New South Wales).

== Sources ==
- Parsons, Vivienne (1966). "Govett, William Romaine (1807–1848)". Australian Dictionary of Biography. National Centre of Biography, Australian National University. ISBN 978-0-522-84459-7. ISSN 1833-7538. OCLC 70677943.
