= Evans Lookout =

Coordinates: 33.64668°S 150.324994°E

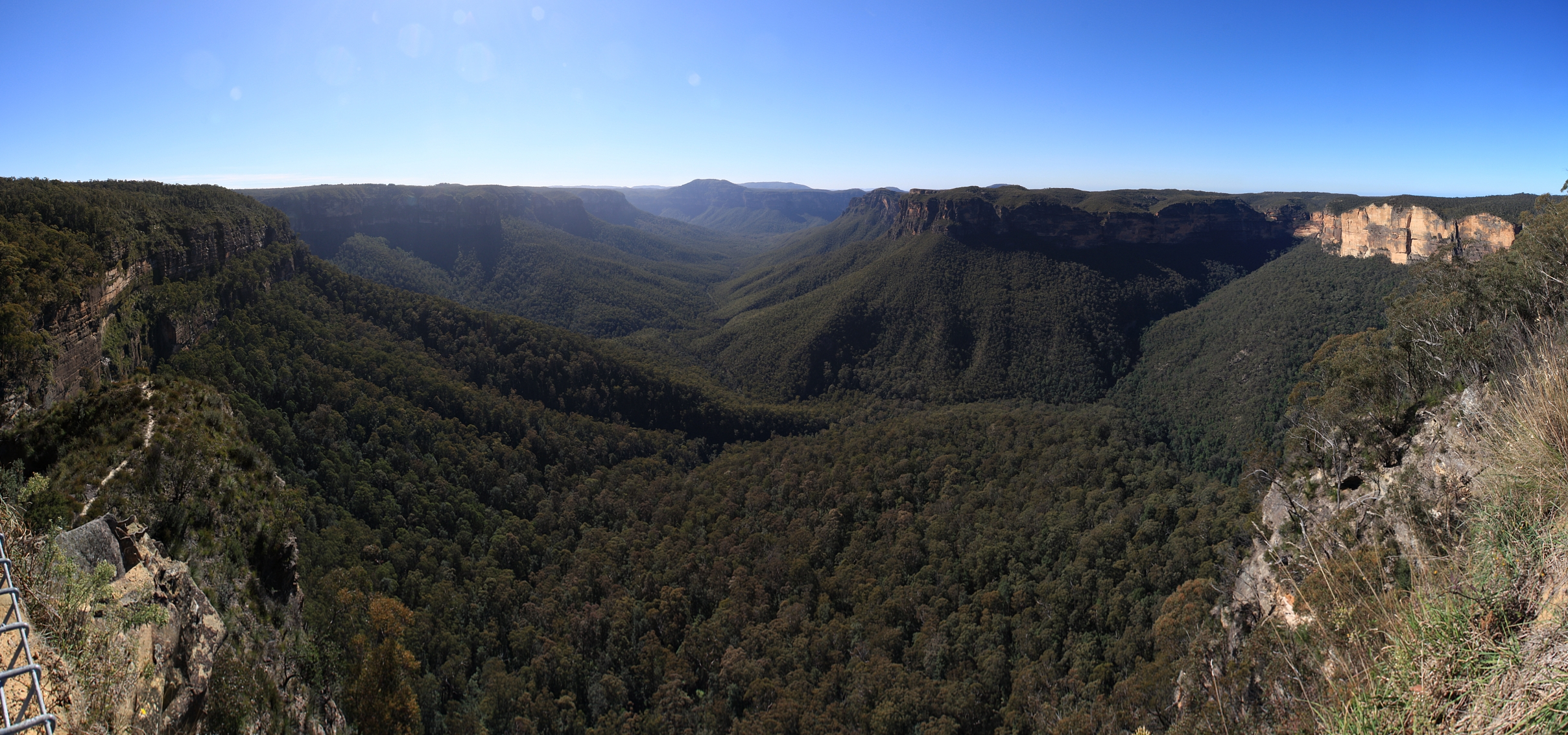
View of the Grose Valley from Evans Lookout

Evans Lookout is a lookout in the Blue Mountains, New South Wales, Australia. Overlooking the sandstone cliffs of the Grose River Valley, the lookout is also an access point for pedestrian access to the valley floor.

Nearby walks include the Grand Canyon and trails to Govetts Leap lookout.

A popular, easily accessible location, the lookout is located within the Blue Mountains National Park close to the town of Blackheath.
