= Perry's Lookdown =

Lookout in the Blue Mountains, Australia

Coordinates: 33°35.979′S 150°20.803′E

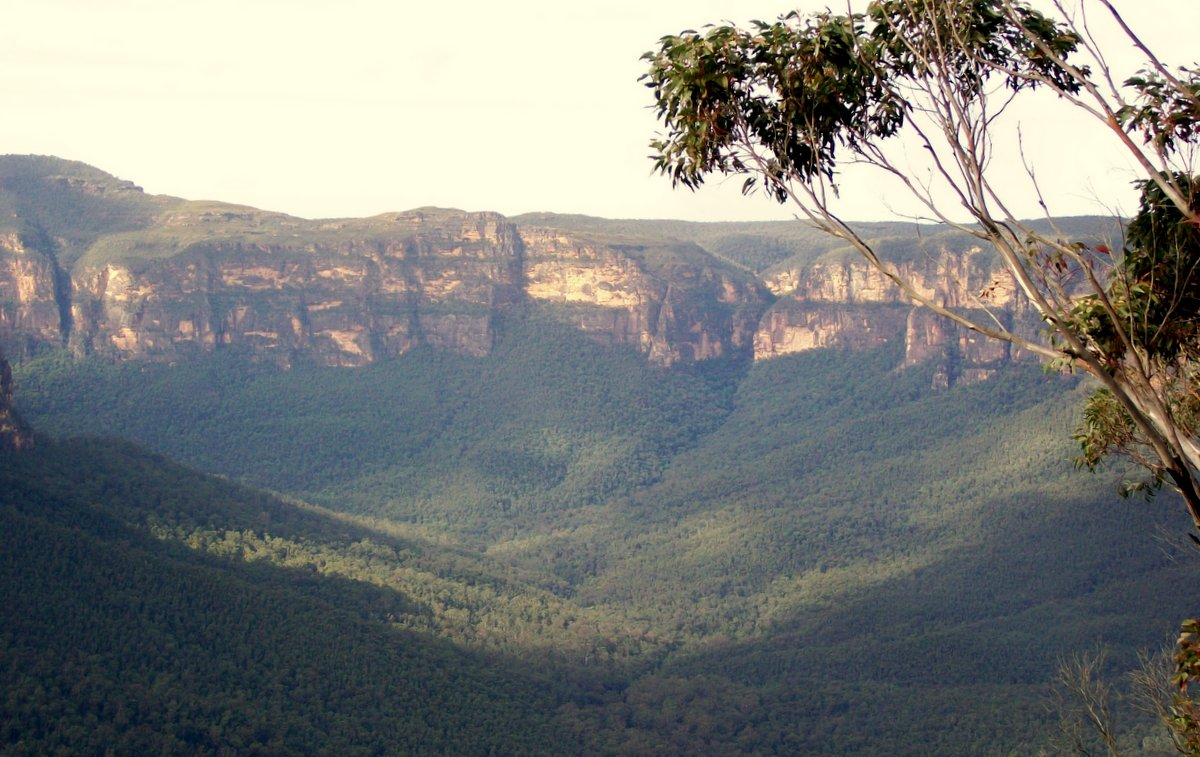
Perrys Lookdown

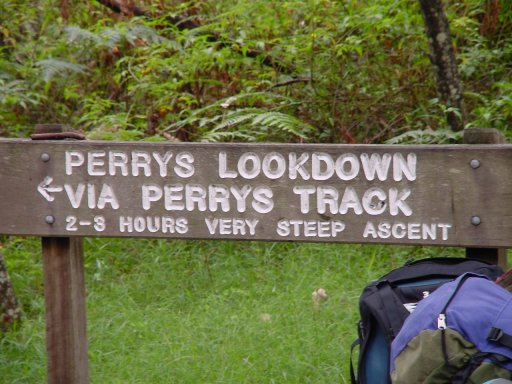
sign at the Blue Gum Forest

Perry's Lookdown is a lookout situated on the edge of the Grose Valley in the Blue Mountains, Australia. It is believed to have been named by Frederick Eccleston Du Faur after either Samuel Augustus Perry or a local innkeeper. Free campsites (five individual sites) are adjacent to the car park. The Blue Gum Forest is often accessed by foot from here, 656 vertical metres below the lookdown. The road to Blackheath is sealed.

== Geography ==
Perry's Lookdown is on the edge of the Grose Valley, with the closest town being Blackheath, a few kilometres away. The sandstone cliffs of Mount Banks and the Banks Wall across the valley is visible from the lookout. The height of the lookout is 980 metres (3,220 ft) above sea level.

Blue Gum Forest is accessible to the walk by a steep walking track descending to the Grose Valley.

There are several campgrounds nearby the lookout, adjacent to the carpark.

== Flora and Fauna ==
Perry's Lookdown hosts a diverse range of flora and fauna. Some of these are protected species. They include native wedge-tailed eagles, gang-gang cockatoos, bell miners and yellow-tailed black cockatoos. Sydney Blue Gums and Deane's blue gums are also found nearby, especially in the descent to Blue Gum Forest.

== See also ==
- Three Sisters
- Mount Banks
- Grose Valley
