= Mount Banks =

Mountain in New South Wales, Australia

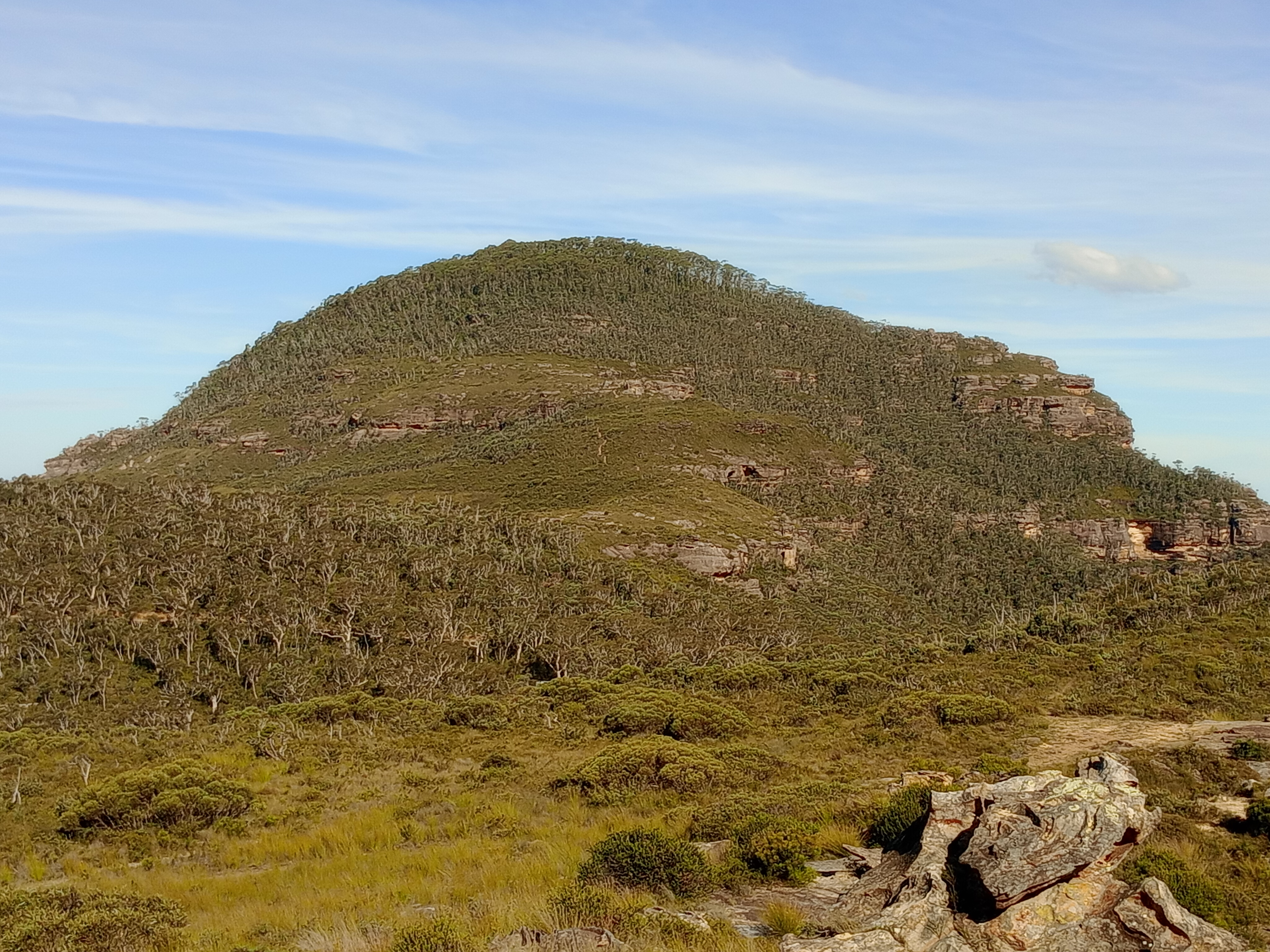
- Mount Banks pictured in April 2026.

Highest point
- Elevation: 1,062 m (3,484 ft)
- Coordinates: 33°35′19″S 150°22′16″E

Geography
- Location within New South Wales
- Location: Blue Mountains, New South Wales, Australia
- Parent range: Explorers Range, Blue Mountains Range

Climbing
- First ascent: George Caley (European, 1804)
- Easiest route: Bells Line of Road

Mount Banks, otherwise known as Mount King George, is a mountain within the Explorers Range of the Blue Mountains Range that is a spur off the Great Dividing Range, is located within the Blue Mountains National Park, approximately 100 kilometres (62 mi) west of Sydney in New South Wales, Australia. Mount Banks is located 8 kilometres (5.0 mi) from the nearest residential area, Mount Tomah, which has an elevation of 1,062 metres (3,484 ft) AMSL, and can be accessed relatively easily via the Bells Line of Road.

== Geography ==
Mount Banks is part of the Explorers Range, which is located along the northern escarpment of the Grose Valley in the Blue Mountains National Park. The Explorers Range starts at Bells Line of Road and extends along the northern edge of the Grose Valley. Mount Banks is the first noticeable peak along the range and is found about 2 kilometres (1.2 mi) from Bells Line of Road. It was named Mount Banks in 1804 by the explorer George Caley, who had worked for the botanist Sir Joseph Banks. Caley was the first European to reach Mount Banks.

The distinctive characteristic about Mount Banks is the way the terrain and vegetation change radically approaching the top of the mountain. For the first two-thirds of the walk, the terrain is the Triassic sandstone, often seen in the Blue Mountains, with a thin, rough scrub. After this, however, there is a basalt cap which gives rise to a richly vegetated environment with grass and a canopy. Views can be had on the lower slopes of the mountains but there is no view at the top, unless the walker edges down the slope towards the escarpment, at which point there are views of the Grose Valley.

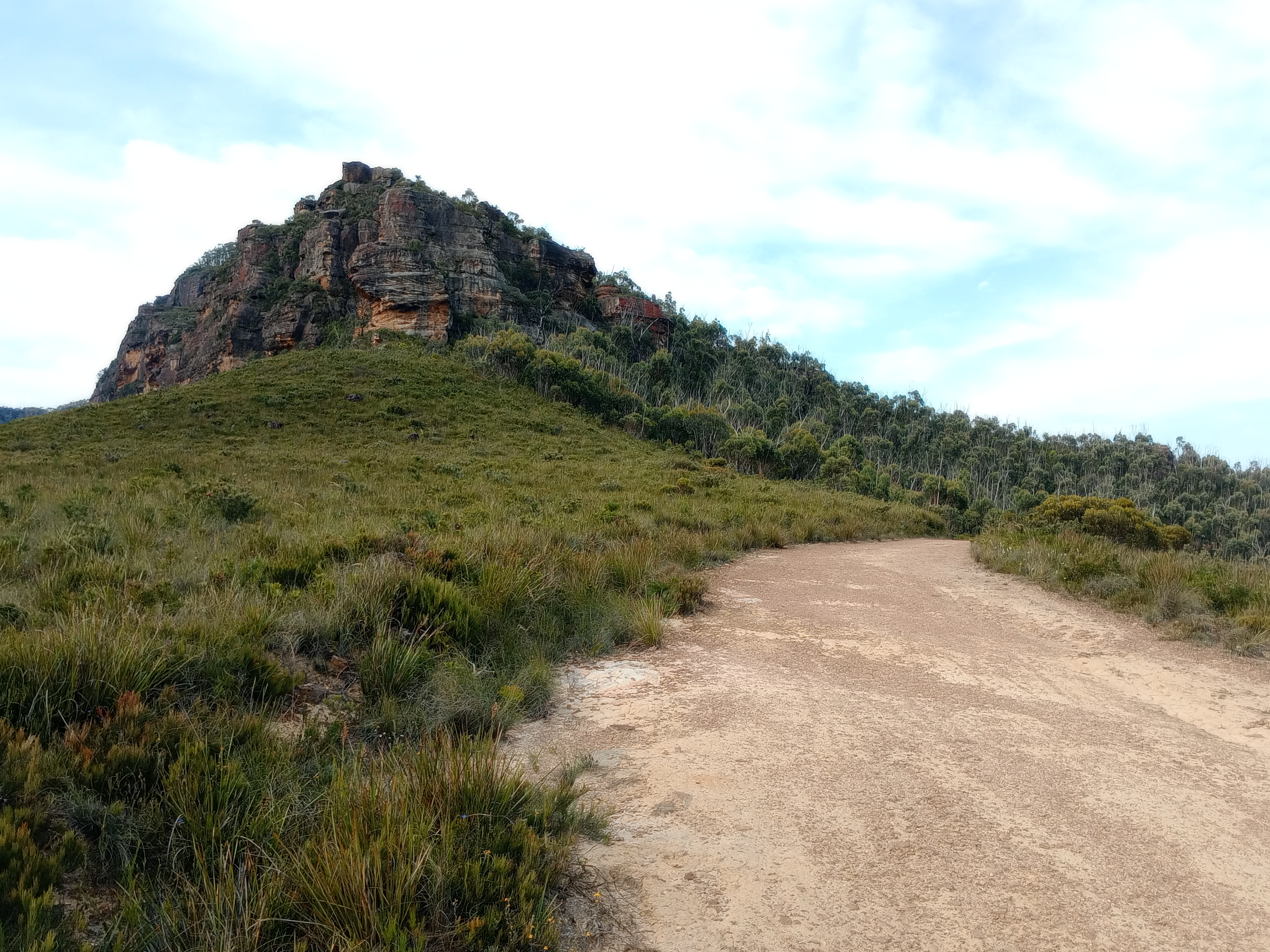
The fire trail and the "tail" of Mount Banks. This is all towards the south of the mountain.

An unsealed road called Mount Banks Road goes from Bells Line of Road to a picnic area about 1 kilometre (0.62 mi) from the junction. This road is widely considered a very dangerous road because it is very narrow and steep. After rain, the road can get muddy and slippery, and might even become inaccessible even to four-wheel-drive vehicles. At this point, vehicular access comes to an end. From the picnic area, a walking track makes its way approximately 1 kilometre (0.62 mi) to the top of Mount Banks, where there is a trigonometric station. This is 1,062 metres (3,484 ft) above sea level. From this point on, there is a fire trail that follows the Explorers Range before terminating above Zobel Gully. According to LPI topographic maps, there is an abandoned mine in Zobel Gully, but is not accessible.

== Activities ==
The area is popular for bushwalking, with extensive views of the Grose Valley from the lower slopes of the mountain and from the fire trail where it goes close to Banks Wall, about 1 kilometre (0.62 mi) south of the mountain. Photography is also popular because of the extensive views. There is no authorised camp site at Mt. Banks and camping at this fragile world heritage site is strictly prohibited.

== Trails ==
=== Summit Walk ===
The Summit Walk is a trail in Mount Banks that leads 1.2 kilometres (0.75 mi) up to the summit of the mountain. The trail is rated at Grade 3 on the Australian Walking Track Grading System. It starts at the picnic spot near the carpark, and ascends up the slope of the mountain via many steps, leading up to the trigonometry station at the summit. There are no views at the summit.

=== Mount Banks Fire Trail ===
A fire trail starting from the carpark winds around the east of the mountain, leading to the Banks Wall, Frank Hurley Head, Edgeworth David Head and the Zobel Gully.

== See also ==
- List of mountains in New South Wales
- Mount Hay
