= Mount Hay (New South Wales) =

Mountain in New South Wales, Australia

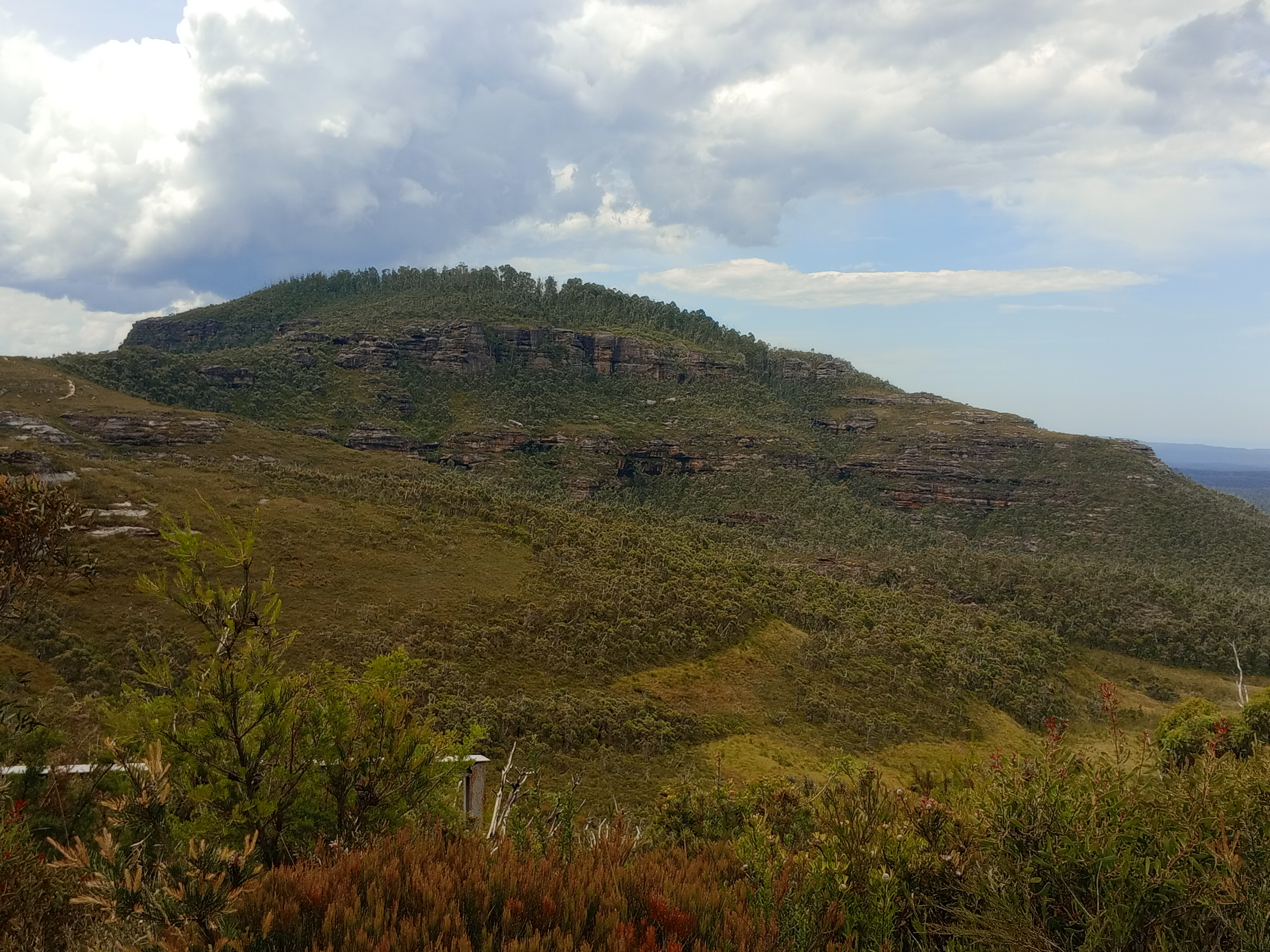
- Mount Hay before a hailstorm, January 2026

Highest point
- Elevation: 944 m (3,097 ft)
- Coordinates: 33°37′16″S 150°24′40″E

Geography
- Location within New South Wales
- Location: New South Wales, Australia
- Parent range: Mt Hay Range, Blue Mountains Range

Mount Hay is a mountain that is part of the Mt Hay Range of the Blue Mountains Range which is a spur off the Great Dividing Range, is located in the Blue Mountains National Park, New South Wales, Australia. It is located approximately 100 kilometres (62 mi) west of Sydney and 10 kilometres (6.2 mi) north of the nearest town, Wentworth Falls. Mount Hay is approximately 944 metres (3,097 ft) AMSL and is one of several basalt caps located within the UNESCO World Heritage Greater Blue Mountains Area.

== Description ==
Mount Hay has a dome-like shape at the summit and it can be found on the southern escarpment of the Grose Valley, one of the main valleys of the Blue Mountains. There is a walking track that goes to the top of the mountain, but the initial approach is via the Mount Hay Road, which branches off from the Great Western Highway at the town of Leura. The road, which is unsealed and fairly rough, winds generally north-east for 14 kilometres (8.7 mi) or so and terminates at the Mount Hay picnic area. The latter is extremely basic, with an unreliable water tank, a stone fireplace and enough room for one tent at a pinch.

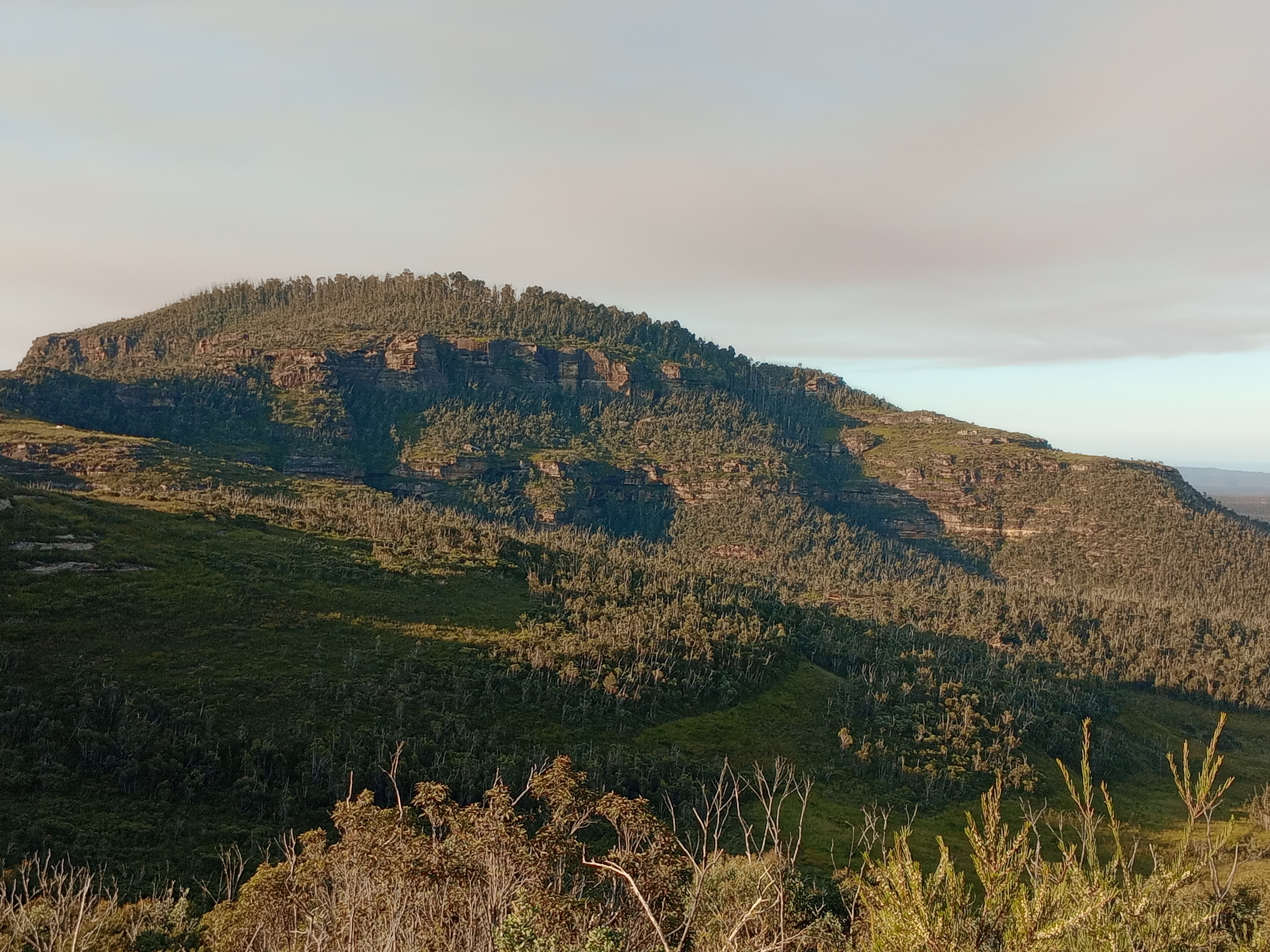
Mount Hay in April 2025 during a nearby backburning operation.

From the picnic area, a track goes to the mountain, which is just over a kilometre away. There are good views of the Grose Valley as the track approaches the mountain, but the views disappear as the track gets higher up. At the top, there is a trigonometric station, but there are no views because of the timber. The top of the mountain is 944 metres (3,097 ft) above sea level.

== Activities ==
The area is popular for bushwalking but not as overused as some parts of the Grose Valley, because it is some distance from the nearest residential areas. About 4 kilometres (2.5 mi) south of the picnic area there are other walk possibilities, in the form of the Lockley Track, which goes down to the Blue Gum Forest, in the Grose Valley. There is also a short walk to the top of the plateau known as Flat Top. Just a little north of the picnic area, there is another track that goes west to Butterbox Point, which provides dramatic views of the valley. The area is also popular for photography because of the extensive valley views. There are no authorised camp sites, but camping is allowed at a reasonable distance from any road. From the summit, Sydney central business district is barely visible in the far distance.

== Incidents ==
=== Jan 2026 ===
On Tuesday, 27 January 2026, two teenage boys, aged 16 and 17 respectively, became separated near Blue Gum Forest and Acacia Flat campground. Both had gone on a three-day "camping adventure" together that went from Emu Plains to Leura, then Mount Hay. Shortly after descending from Mount Hay down to the Grose Valley, they were getting close to Acacia Flat campground, when the 16-year-old disappeared. A camper walking with the duo had reported that the 16-year-old had apparently dropped something, then ran into the bushes. The 17-year-old walked further down the track and found his companion's backpack alone. The 17-year-old then walked off the trail, trying to find his companion. After several hours, he realised he was getting lost and at 5:45 pm, shortly after 6 pm, he activated his personal locater beacon. Rescue helicopters and emergency personnel came to the scene, and the 17-year-old was winched out near Acacia Flat campground, 36 kilometres (22 mi) from Mount Hay.

Emergency services then started to search for the 16-year-old. The search involved multiple agencies, including the Blue Mountains Rescue Squad and the Toll Rescue Helicopter. The search commenced for two days, until the body of the 16-year-old was located in a creek near Blue Gum Forest at approximately 1 pm on Thursday, 29 January.

It has been declared that police will conduct a post-mortem examination of the body of the 16-year-old, as well as a coronial investigation.

=== May 2026 ===
On 18 May 2026, Mount Hay Road, the only vehicular access route to Mount Hay, was closed for road upgrades. The closure will end on 17 December 2026.

== See also ==
- List of mountains in New South Wales
