= Govetts Leap Falls =

Govetts Leap
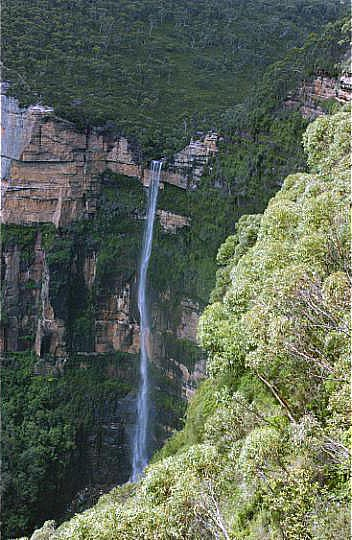
- Govetts Leap Falls

- Location within New South Wales
- Location: Blue Mountains, New South Wales, Australia
- Coordinates: 33°38′S 150°19′E
- Type: Bridal veil
- Total height: 180 metres (590 ft)
- Number of drops: 1
- Longest drop: 180 metres (590 ft)
- Watercourse: Govetts Leap Brook

The Govetts Leap Falls, or simply Govetts Leap, is a bridal veil waterfall on the Govetts Leap Brook where it falls 180 metres (591 ft) over Taylor Wall, located at Govetts Leap Lookout approximately 2.4 kilometres (1.5 mi) east of Blackheath in the Blue Mountains region of New South Wales, Australia. It is the 17th tallest waterfall in Australia.

== Location and features ==
Govetts Leap Falls is situated overlooking the Grose Valley in the Blue Mountains National Park. The falls takes its name from William Romaine Govett, a Government Surveyor who was the first European to discover the falls in c. 1831.

The waterfall has a single drop of about 180 metres (590 ft).

At the nearby Govetts Leap Lookout there are public toilets, picnic tables and access to water.

== See also ==
- List of waterfalls
- List of waterfalls in Australia
