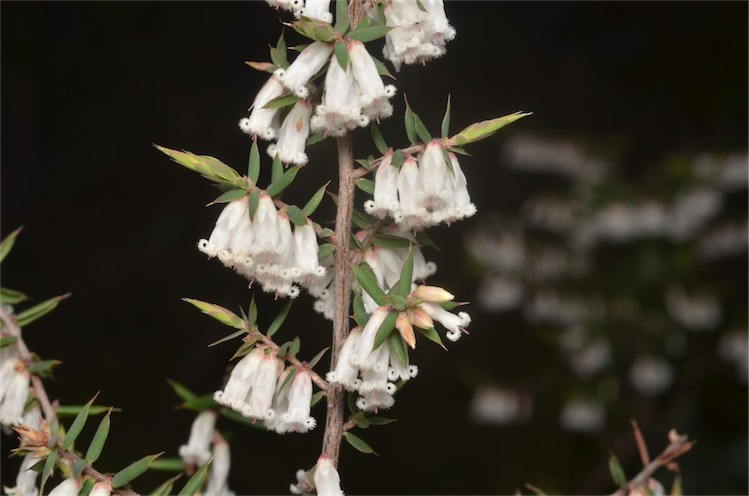
- In Namadgi National Park

Scientific classification
- Kingdom: Plantae
- Clade: Tracheophytes
- Clade: Angiosperms
- Clade: Eudicots
- Clade: Asterids
- Order: Ericales
- Family: Ericaceae
- Genus: Styphelia
- Species: S. fletcheri

Binomial name
- Styphelia fletcheri (Maiden & Betche) Maiden and Betche
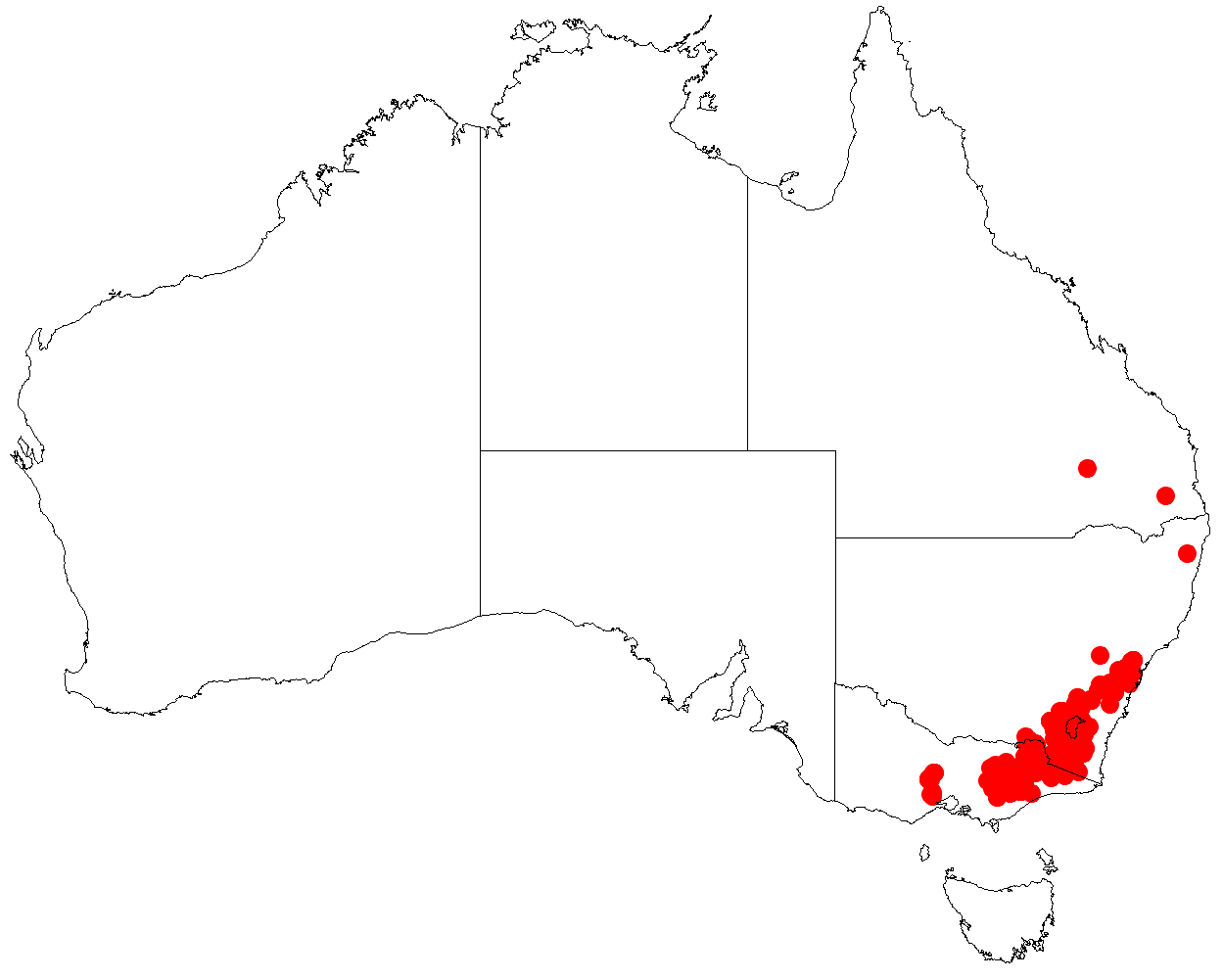
- Occurrence data from AVH

Synonyms
- Leucopogon fletcheri Maiden & Betche

= Styphelia fletcheri =

Species of flowering plant

Styphelia fletcheri is a species of flowering plant in the heath family Ericaceae and is endemic to south-eastern continental Australia. It is a densely-branched shrub with sharply-pointed oblong leaves, and pendent, tube-shaped white flowers in pairs in upper leaf axils.

== Description ==
Styphelia fletcheri is a densely-branched shrub that typically grows to a height of up to 1.8 m (5 ft 11 in) and has rough-textured branchlets. Its leaves are oblong to linear and sharply pointed, 3.7–8 mm (0.15–0.31 in) long and 1.4–3.1 mm (0.055–0.122 in) wide on a petiole up to 0.3 mm (0.012 in) long. The flowers are white and pendent, arranged singly, in pairs or threes in upper leaf axils on a peduncle up to 1.5 mm (0.059 in) long, with bracteoles 1.2–1.6 mm (0.047–0.063 in) long at the base. The sepals are 2.6–4.7 mm (0.10–0.19 in) long, the petal tube 2.6–4.8 mm (0.10–0.19 in) long and softly hairy above the middle, the lobes 2.4–3.8 mm (0.094–0.150 in) long. Flowering occurs from August to October and the fruit is a glabrous, egg-shaped to elliptic drupe 3.0–5.3 mm (0.12–0.21 in) long.

== Taxonomy ==
This species was first formally described in 1897 by Joseph Maiden and Ernst Betche in the Proceedings of the Linnean Society of New South Wales from specimens collected near Springwood by Joseph James Fletcher in September 1887. In 1916, Maiden and Betche transferred the species to the genus Styphelia as S. fletcheri in A Census of New South Wales Plants.

In 1993, Jocelyn Marie Powell and G.Robertson described subspecies brevisepalus in the journal Telopea and in 2020, Hislop, Crayn & Puente-Lel. transferred the subspecies and that of the autonym, to Styphelia, and the subspecies names are accepted by the Plants of the World Online:

- Styphelia fletcheri (J.M.Powell) Hislop, Crayn & Puente-Lel. subsp. brevisepalus typically grows to a height of 0.3–1.0 m (1 ft 0 in – 3 ft 3 in), has leaves 3.7–7.8 mm (0.15–0.31 in) long and 1.7–3.1 mm (0.067–0.122 in) wide, a petal tube 2.6–3.9 mm (0.10–0.15 in) long, the lobes 2.4–3.1 mm (0.094–0.122 in) long and fruit 3.0–3.4 mm (0.12–0.13 in) long.
- Styphelia fletcheri subsp. fletcheri Maiden & Betche typically grows to a height of 1.5–1.8 m (4 ft 11 in – 5 ft 11 in), has leaves 4.5–8.0 mm (0.18–0.31 in) long and 1.4–1.9 mm (0.055–0.075 in) wide, a petal tube 3.5–4.8 mm (0.14–0.19 in) long, the lobes 2.8–3.8 mm (0.11–0.15 in) long and fruit 4.7–5.0 mm (0.19–0.20 in) long.

== Distribution and habitat ==
This species of Styphelia grows in woodland in New South Wales, the Australian Capital Territory, and in montane and subalpine areas of eastern Victoria where it is known as Styphelia fletcheri subsp. brevisepala. Subspecies fletcheri grows in woodland and shrubland, but is restricted to the area between St Albans and Annangrove in north-western Sydney.

== Conservation status ==
Styphelia fletcheri (as Leucopogon fletcheri) is listed as "endangered" under the New South Wales Government Biodiversity Conservation Act 2016. The main threats to the subspecies include habitat loss and fragmentation, inappropriate fire regimes and weed invasion.
