= Possumwood =

Possumwood may refer to various trees:

- Diospyros virginiana (American persimmon), in warm-temperate North America
- Hura crepitans (sandbox tree), in the tropical Americas
- Quintinia sieberi, a rainforest tree of eastern Australia
