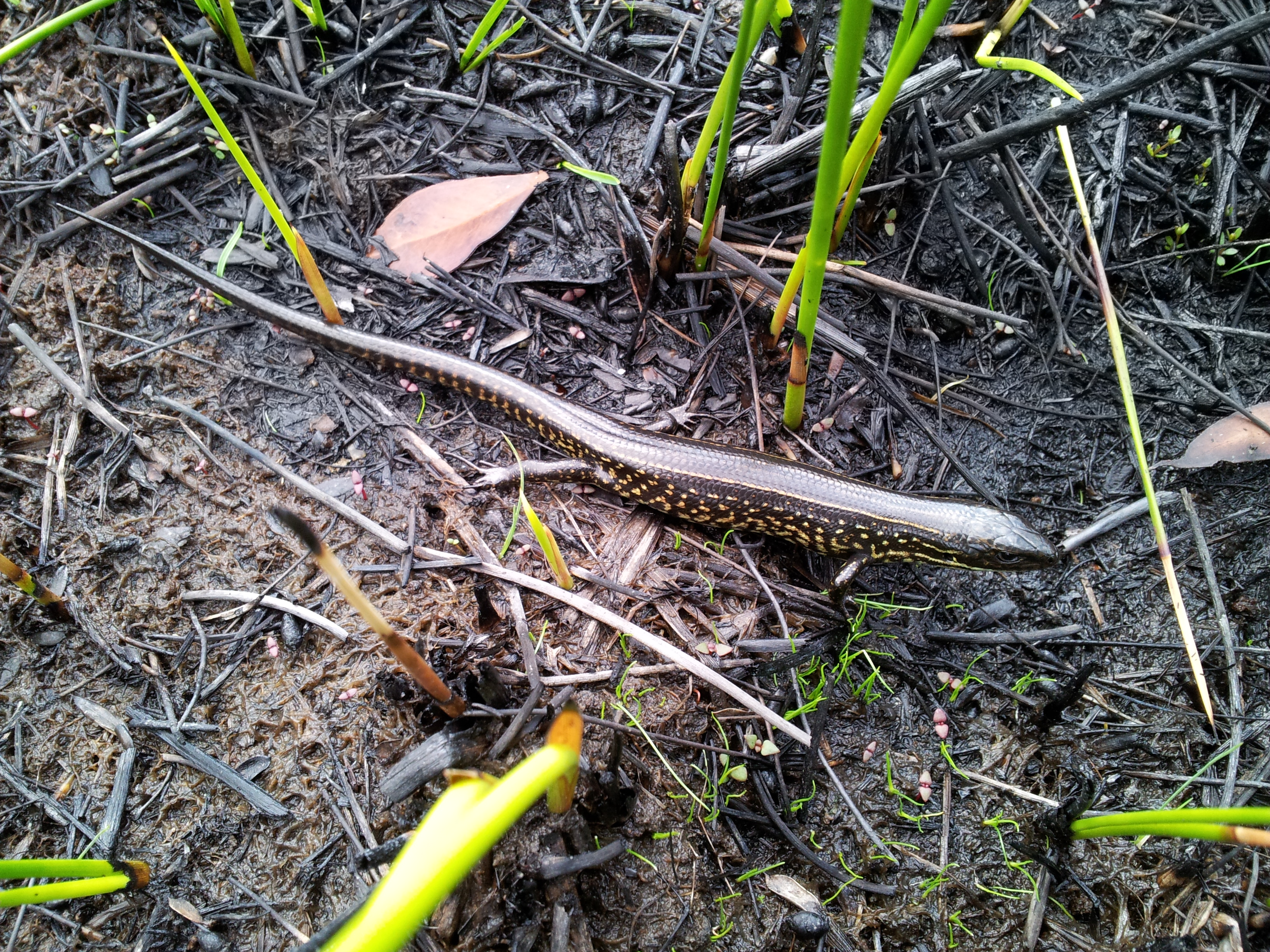

Conservation status
- Endangered (IUCN 3.1)

Scientific classification
- Kingdom: Animalia
- Phylum: Chordata
- Class: Reptilia
- Order: Squamata
- Family: Scincidae
- Genus: Eulamprus
- Species: E. leuraensis

Binomial name
- Eulamprus leuraensis Wells & Wellington, 1983

= Blue Mountains water skink =

Species of lizard

The Blue Mountains water skink or Blue Mountains swamp-skink (Eulamprus leuraensis) is a species of skink in the family Scincidae. An endangered species, it is found only in restricted parts of the mountains of southeastern Australia.

== Description ==
The Blue Mountains water skink has a snout-to vent length of about 80 mm (3 in) and a tail length of about 120 mm (5 in). The head is bronze to brown with black markings. The dorsal surface of the body is dark brown or blackish and on either side of the spine are rows of fine yellowish-bronze or white spots, giving the impression of continuous pale lines. These continue onto the dark-coloured tail as rows of spots. The flanks and limbs are dark brown or blackish with yellowish or bronze markings and the underparts are cream or yellow with small dark markings. The legs are robust and there are five toes on each foot. This species is unlikely to be confused with other species of Eulamprus because of its overall darker colour.

== Distribution and habitat ==
This species is endemic to the Blue Mountains of New South Wales in Australia. There are two separate populations, one on the Newnes Plateau, and the second on the other side of the range just south of Hazelbrook. These populations are split into about forty actual locations where the skink is found, its habitat being swampy areas with sedges and small shrubs, at altitudes between 560 and 1,060 m (1,800 and 3,500 ft). Analysis of microsatellite loci of the subpopulations has shown that they are genetically distinct, with very little dispersal of individual skinks from one location to another. What movement there is appears only to involve males.

== Ecology ==
The skink is one of about four hundred species of animal found in the Greater Blue Mountains Area, a UNESCO World Heritage Site consisting of peaks, plateaus, gorges and escarpments. The site is significantly representative of the Australia's biodiversity and contains ninety-one species of Eucalyptus. The Blue Mountain water skink is semi-aquatic and can be seen between September and April. It likes to bask in the sun and forages for flies, grasshoppers, moths, weevils and wasps, and may occasionally eat small fruits. The female is viviparous and gives birth to live young in the austral summer (December).

== Status ==
E. leuraensis is listed as "endangered" by the International Union for Conservation of Nature.
