= Erskine Creek =

River in Australia

Coordinates: 33°52′S 150°30′E

Erskine

Location
- Country: Australia
- State: New South Wales
- Region: Sydney Basin (IBRA), Blue Mountains
- Municipality: City of Blue Mountains

Physical characteristics
- Source confluence: Bedford Creek and Glen Erskine Creek
  - location: Mount Erskine
  - elevation: 367 m (1,204 ft)
- Mouth: confluence with the Nepean River
  - location: near Mulgoa
  - elevation: 38 m (125 ft)
- Length: 21 km (13 mi)

Basin features
- River system: Hawkesbury-Nepean catchment
- National park: Blue Mountains NP

The Erskine Creek, a perennial stream of the Hawkesbury-Nepean catchment, is located in the Blue Mountains region of New South Wales, Australia.

== Course ==
Formed by the confluence of the Bedford and Glen Erskine creeks, the Erskine Creek (officially designated a river) rises below Mount Erskine, between Bullaburra and Wentworth Falls, and flows generally south, north-east, and east, before reaching its confluence with the Nepean River, near Mulgoa. The river descends 329 metres (1,079 ft) over its 21-kilometre (13 mi) course.

The river is entirely contained within the world heritage-listed Blue Mountains National Park.

== See also ==
- List of rivers of Australia
- List of rivers of New South Wales (A–K)
- Rivers of New South Wales
