= Adelina Falls =

Waterfall in New South Wales, Australia

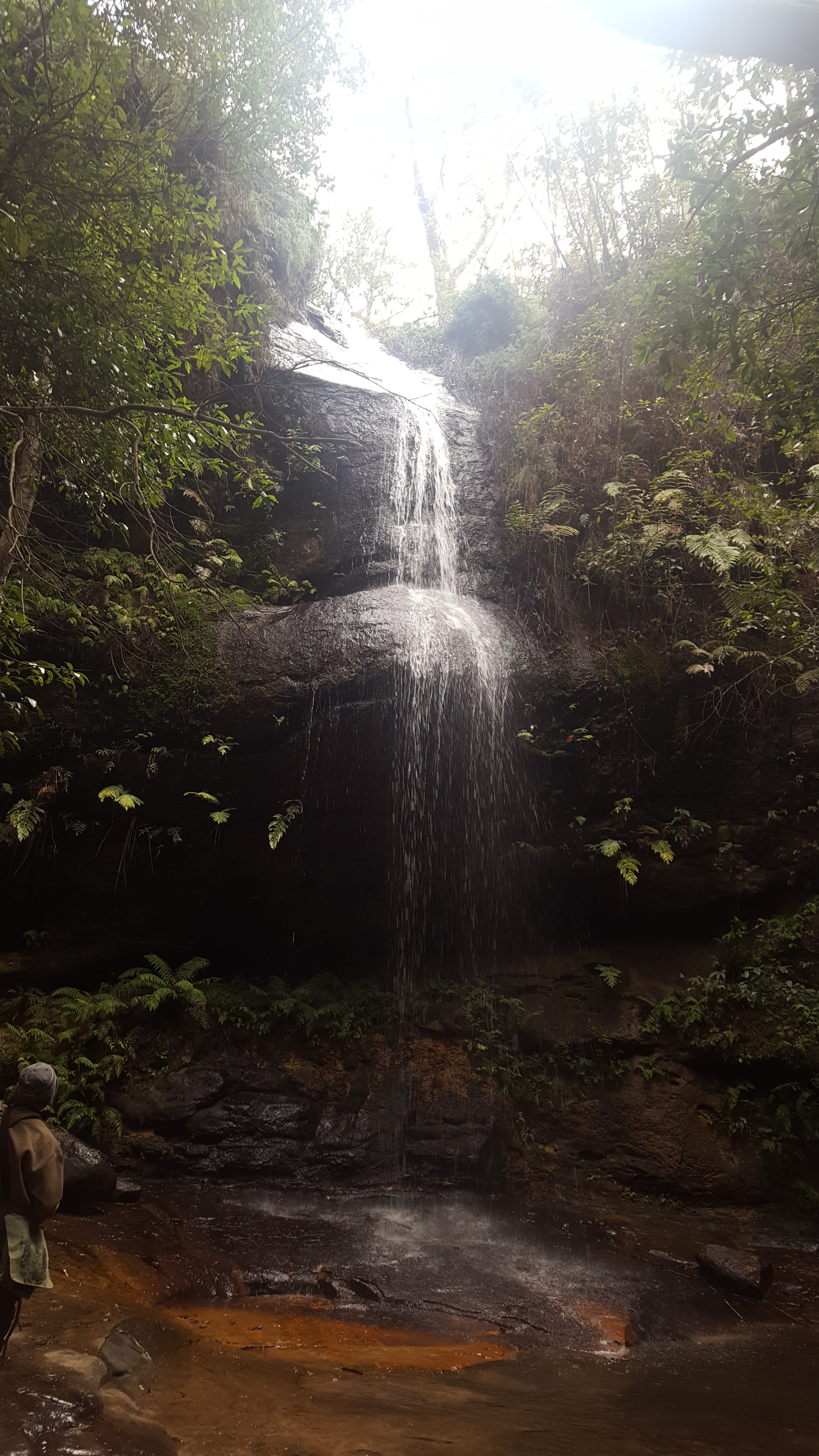
- Adelina Falls from its base

- Location within New South Wales
- Location: Blue Mountains, New South Wales, Australia
- Coordinates: 33°43′40.3″S 150°26′12.8″E
- Watercourse: Lawson Creek

Adelina Falls, previously referred to as Livingstone Falls, is a plunge waterfall located near Lawson, New South Wales, Australia, in the South Lawson Park. The falls are located within the South Lawson Waterfall Circuit in the Blue Mountains. The falls can be accessed from the Blue Mountains Rail Line or by car.

== Overview ==
Adelina Falls can be found on Lawson Creek with a waterfall height of around 15m. It is a plunge waterfall located in the South Lawson Waterfall Circuit. It is accessed from a 0.1 kilometres (0.062 mi) track from the Northern Entrance/Carpark. Adelina Falls is on Dharug and Gundungurra Land.

== Description ==
To the south-west of Adelina Falls, there is a large canyon with a small waterflow on the base. The base of Adelina Falls has a bit of an orange-tinge due to the erosion of the base, unveiling clay underneath. There is a bridge, right before the base of the falls, crossing Lawson Creek.

== Activities ==
Photography and hiking can be done near the falls.

== See also ==
- Cataract Falls
- Federal Falls
