= Lawson railway station =

Railway station in New South Wales, Australia

Lawson
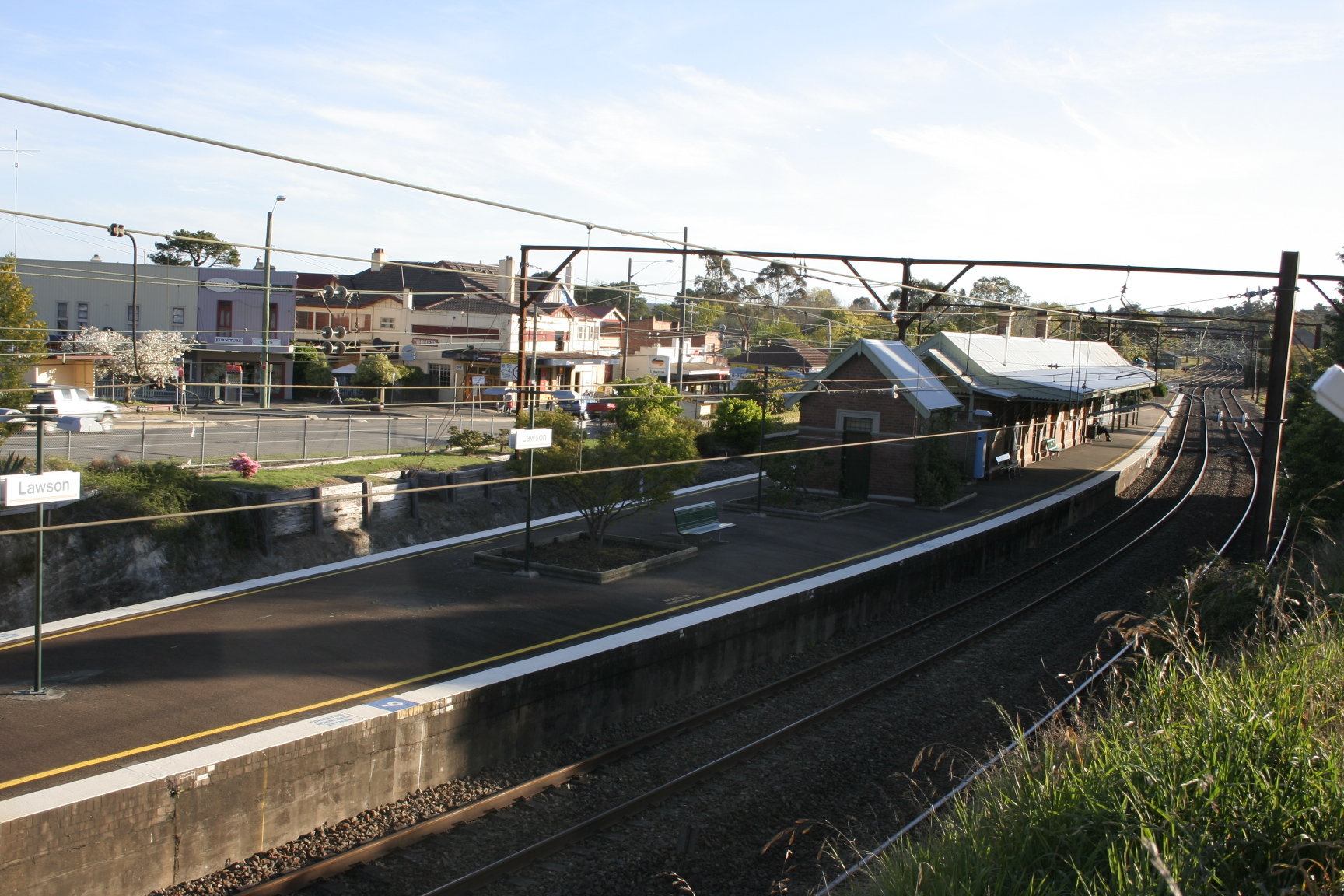
- Westbound view of the station platforms, September 2007

General information
- Location: Loftus Street, Lawson; Australia
- Coordinates: 33°43′09″S 150°25′47″E
- Elevation: 732 metres (2,402 ft)
- Owner: Transport Asset Manager of New South Wales
- Operator: Sydney Trains
- Line: Main Western
- Distance: 96.04 km (59.68 mi) from Central
- Platforms: 2 (1 island)
- Tracks: 3
- Connections: Bus

Construction
- Structure type: Ground

Other information
- Status: Weekdays: Staffed: 6am to 5.30pm: Weekends and public holidays: Unstaffed
- Station code: LWN
- Website: Transport for NSW

History
- Opened: 11 July 1867
- Former names: Blue Mountain (1867–1879)

Passengers
- 2025: 72,700 (year); 199 (daily) (Sydney Trains, NSW TrainLink)

Services
Preceding station	Intercity Trains	Following station
Bullaburra towards Lithgow	Blue Mountains Line	Hazelbrook towards Central

New South Wales Heritage Register
- Official name: Lawson Railway Station Group; Christmas Swamp; Blue Mountain
- Type: State heritage (complex / group)
- Designated: 2 April 1999
- Reference no.: 1177
- Type: Railway Platform / Station
- Category: Transport – Rail
Location

Lawson railway station is a heritage-listed railway station located on the Main Western line in Lawson in the City of Blue Mountains local government area of New South Wales, Australia. It is also known as Lawson Railway Station Group and Christmas Swamp; Blue Mountain. The property was added to the New South Wales State Heritage Register on 2 April 1999. A passing loop exists north of Platform 1. As part of widening work to the Great Western Highway, a siding south of Platform 2 was removed and a new submerged siding constructed west of the station.

== History ==
Lawson was opened as a halt when the Main Western line was extended from Penrith to Weatherboard on 11 July 1867, bearing the name Blue Mountain after Wilson's "Blue Mountain Inn" located 400 metres away. On 21 April 1879, the station was renamed to Lawson and a brick platform and station building were added and this remained unchanged until 1902. Like most stations between Emu Plains and Lithgow, duplication of the line in 1902 brought a new island platform and station buildings in Federation style. The 1879 platform opposite remained for Down trains.

Various modifications to the refuge siding and loop were made in 1907 and 1915. At the Lithgow end of the main structure, the roof was extended to provide a shelter for a signal interlocking frame, which was installed in 1915, though the signal levers were not enclosed with a signal box until 1921.

In 1944 the island platform was extended to the west end and it was at this time that subway access was provided to the platform from the Sydney-bound side. This accorded with the traditional NSW practice between 1900 and 1920 of providing only single-side subway access.

Lawson became an important station as locomotives took on water at that location. Lawson had a large water-tank and an unusual number of water columns since it was the principal watering-halt for Down trains. Recent widening of the Great Western Highway has revealed the remains of what appears to be an underground tank of unknown use.

The station was accompanied by a Station Masters residence which was built in c. 1880, and replaced by the existing Station Master's residence in c. 1896. When Chief Commissioner E.M.G. Eddy, was appointed in 1888, he undertook to increase substantially the number of official residences for staff of the Traffic Branch. Over 100 residences were built in his term and that at Lawson is one of them. Residences very roughly reflected the status of the proposed occupant. The example at Lawson (10 Loftus Street) is an example of the largest type that was used in the period 1890–1914. It contained three bedrooms. The asymmetrical plan of the structure predates Eddy's arrival and was first used in 1885.

Adjacent to the Sydney-bound side of the rail corridor is an electrical traction sub-station and electrical depot containing a mixture of buildings originally clad in corrugated Fibro. The substation was built in 1956 in preparation for the complete electrification of the Main Western line from Penrith to Lithgow in 1957. This was the major extension of the metropolitan electrified system after World War II and the first designed to handle the electric haulage of rail freight trains, predominantly coal trains, as well as long-distance electric passenger train services.

The substation was the last of the large brick substations built for the rail electrified system and the largest on the Main Western line past Penrith. Modern solid state rectifier technology has now largely superseded the need for this type of substation building. It is associated and adjacent to the large Lawson electric line works maintenance depot that still operates with administration offices. The substation was designed by New South Wales Government Railways and built in 1956. It suffered some fire damage in 2003.

== Platforms and services ==
Lawson has one island platform with two sides. It is serviced by Sydney Trains Blue Mountains Line services travelling from Sydney Central to Lithgow.

Platform	Line	Stopping pattern	Notes
1	Blue Mountains Line	services to Sydney Central	
2	Blue Mountains Line	services to Katoomba, Mount Victoria & Lithgow	

== Description ==
The complex comprises a type 11 brick station building, initial island side building, erected in 1902, incorporating a fibrocement clad signal box, completed in 1921; and a brick out shed, completed in 1902. Other structures included a brick-faced island platform, completed in 1902; a remnant timber paling facing side platform, completed in c. 1879, and a pedestrian subway, completed in 1944. Other structures include the Station Master's Residence at 10 Loftus Street, type 11, brick, tile roof, erected in 1896; and electrical depot site with the former District Engineer's Office – brick (1956) and the workshops – brick base, corrugated iron walls (1957); as well as the signals and earthworks depot (1956–57); and a face brick substation (1956).

=== Station building (1902) and Signal Box (1921) ===
External: Constructed of face brick with corrugated metal gabled roof extending as an awning to both platforms, Lawson station building is a single storey early phase "type 11" island platform building in standard Federation style design. It is an 8-bay long building featuring 7 bays to the original face brick section and 1 long bay to the signal box extension and has a linear arrangement along the platform with tuckpointed red brickwork and engaged piers between the bays. The extended bay at the southwest end has painted fibrocement wall panels on rendered brick base with 6-pane horizontal sliding windows and a timber door with decorative fanlight. Other features include rendered splay course to plinth, moulded cornice, two horizontal moulded rendered string courses at corbel height, timber framed double-hung windows with multi-paned coloured glass upper sashes, timber framed and panelled doors with multi-paned coloured glass fanlights, contrasting decorative trims and sills around windows and doors, standard iron brackets over decorative corbels supporting ample platform awnings, fretted timber work at the end of awnings and gable ends, timber cross finial to gable end, two tall face brick corbelled chimneys with rendered tops. A modern corrugated metal gable roof with flat awning has been extended off the southwest end of the station building to provide shelter over the subway entrance and extended platform shelter area for commuters. It is supported by steel beams and posts. Another gabled roof with corrugated clear sheeting and corrugated metal awnings on both sides extends above the men's toilets entry. All windows and doors are fitted with metal security grills and gates.

Internal: In 1994 the building underwent internal fabric alterations, however it maintains its original linear floor layout, which from Up end to Down end incorporates a former signal room, combined Station Master's office and booking office, general waiting room, ladies' waiting room and toilets, and men's toilets. Original features include timber panelled doors with multi-paned coloured glass fanlights in the ladies room and work station areas, moulded architraves to all external and internal doors and the ticket window. Light fittings, fans and floor covering including carpet finish in the offices and tiles in the toilets and the waiting room. Plasterboard ceilings are from the upgrade works. Doors have been clad with fire rated panels from inside. The former signal box within the station building is now used for storage purposes, however its interlocking 16 lever frame and the CTC panel are still extant.

=== Out-of shed (1902) ===
External: A small square shaped detached face brick shed featuring moulding and rendered string course detailing similar to the main station building. It is located on the northeast (Up) side of the station building. The shed features a gabled corrugated metal roof with timber bargeboard and narrow eaves with exposed rafters, contrasting rendered moulded trim above the fanlight over a single door on northeast side elevation and two double – hung windows with multi-paned upper sash featuring multi-coloured glass panes similar to the station building on both of the side elevations. There are two rows of string course throughout all elevations. There is no opening on the south-western (Down) elevation of the building.

Internal: Currently used as a storeroom with a timber cupboard and shelving, the out-of shed consists of a concrete floor with painted brick walls, exposed timber roof structure with ceiling joists, rafters and relatively new corrugated metal roofing, and one single modern light fitting.

=== Island platform (1902) ===
Lawson Railway Station has an island platform in a curved shape with slightly pointed ends. The platform is brick faced with concrete deck and asphalt finish. Garden beds are located along the length of the platform planted with low to medium height shrubs and plantings. One mature tree is present on the platform at the northeast end. The platform also features period and modern light fittings, timber bench seating, an early bubbler, modern signage and aluminium palisade fencing located around three sides of subway cavity for safety and at both ends of the platform.

=== Side platform (c. 1879) ===
The original side platform is no longer clearly visible as a former platform rather it presents a garden bed like appearance, with a raised flat surface with timber paling edgings and earth infill. The end of the down siding, which was only used occasionally until recently to store track machines when waiting to start or be collected after trackwork, has been partially removed and completely covered with aggregate as part of upgrading works along the road boundaries of the rail corridor. Only two posts of the end timber stopper remain.

=== Pedestrian subway (1944) ===
Access to the island platform is via an asphalt ramped access way from the Great Western Highway and Loftus Street (and commuters' car park) which leads to the face brick vaulted subway and a central stairway to the station platform on the southwest side of the main station building. The entry to the pedestrian subway on the island platform has brick walls with stone capping and metal palisade fence between the iron posts supporting the new corrugated metal gabled roof with awnings on both sides. The underpass tunnel extension towards the Great Western Highway exit features a flat ceiling with curved edges unlike the Loftus Street tunnel and painted with graffiti all-around. Light fittings and security cameras are other features of the subway.

=== Station Master's residence (1896) ===
External: The site of the residence is located between the Electric Depot and the Signals and Earthworks Depot. It is a single-storey cottage of painted brick construction with a stone base, a tiled-hipped roof with square flat apex, three tall chimney stacks with corbelled tops, timber front and rear off set concrete verandahs supported on timber posts with pitched corrugated iron awning and a rear brick skillion wing extended with timber weatherboard addition. The residence does not conform to any standard design although has similarities to a standard J3 design. Segmental arched vertically proportioned windows feature rendered sills, some with skillion timber awnings. All openings have been boarded up.

Internal: The original floor layout remains containing three bedrooms, two open into a corridor and the other into the living room, and a separate sitting room off the corridor. A wing accessed via an enclosed verandah (and from one of the bedrooms by later opening) includes a kitchen with a later c. 1946 timber extension for a laundry and internal bathroom. Most of the original elements have either been replaced or removed including all fireplaces. Early features include timber framed double-hung windows with moulded timber architraves and skirting, ventilation panels in some rooms, timber panelled front door with fanlight and an early kitchen shelf above the boarded fireplace. The kitchen has been fitted with modern cupboards and the bathroom fittings are modern. Exposed rendered brick walls are present in the kitchen and timber floor ceiling boards are exposed in some of the rooms where the later fibro ceiling panels are damaged. The residence is currently unoccupied.

=== Electrical depot site ===
Located to the northwest of Lawson Station adjacent to the laneway and subway entrance, the Electrical Depot site is a combination of the former District Engineer's Office and a series of brick and corrugated iron workshops and stores that were built in the 1950s as part of the electrification of the railway to Lithgow. The buildings appear to be original and demonstrate an important component of the electrification project. The workshops and the stores are placed at the railway and street boundaries of the site while the L-shaped office block is located on the northern corner next to the entrance to the depot. The areas between the buildings are used for the storage of dangerous goods containers, ladder storage, truck waiting, steam cleaning and water treatment areas. The surface of the site is bitumen.

=== Former district engineer's office (1956) ===
External: A large one to two-storey brick office building with hipped terracotta tiled roof, in an L-shaped form and accommodates administration and amenities and facilities for the engineers and field/admin staff. The building's fenestration includes a series of regularly placed tall timber sash windows and doors generally facing the courtyard.

Internal: Interiors were not inspected (2009). However, the original drawings indicate a linear floor layout with offices around the perimeters opening into a central corridor. The main entrance to the building separates the building into two distinct layout with offices and staff amenities on one side and the general exchange and depot/services rooms on the other.

=== Workshops (1957) ===
External: There are seven workshops and stores on the depot site all of which are generally of similar construction with utilitarian appearance in various sizes and one or two storeys in height. They are constructed of brick bases with corrugated metal walls to about 1200mm high above with corrugated metal gabled roofs. All have timber framed multi-paned vertically proportioned windows and doors. They accommodate an electrical workshop, blacksmith and carpenter workshop, and stores for various goods.

Internal: Interiors were not inspected (2009).

=== Signals and earthworks depots ===
Two adjoining sites at the western side of the Station Master's residence and contain only demountable corrugated metal sheds and containers with carport and garages in between. They appear to be replaced over the years with relatively new fabric.

=== Sub-station (1956) ===
External: Located at the most western portion of the depot site, the substation is a two-storey face brick building in rectangular form with gabled roof covered with corrugated metal tray roof sheets. The substation combines a large relatively square shaped control house and a rectangular rectifier house at the back. The building elevations are strongly modelled with large vertical engaged piers. The gable end to the control house is parapeted with piers projecting horizontally. The rectifier house has a ventilation tower at the centre of the gable apex below which is a large roller shutter. All windows are steel framed with horizontal panes. The building is screened from the road by banks of outside transformers.

Internal: Interiors were not accessed (2009). However, it is noted to have a steel truss exposed roof structure and concrete slab floors with painted wall finishes to the essentially large warehouse type spaces.

=== Moveable items ===
Lawson Railway Station houses a number of movable items including:

- A Milners' 2'2 Patent floor safe in the ticket office below the ticket window desk
- A bubbler on platform next to the subway entrance
- Three bench seats (2 in the waiting room, 1 in the ladies room)
- 16 lever frame and CTC panel in the disused signal box
- A work bench for booking window

== Landscape features ==
The setting of the station within the rock escarpment is the typical natural setting of the Blue Mountains stations. The island platform and stations buildings are a prominent aspect of the landscape and a local landmark. Most garden beds are built up with treated pine edges containing low to medium-sized shrubs. One mature tree exists at the northeast end of the platform. Brick dwarf walls to the subway tunnel entries on both sides of the trucks together with the low height plantings add to the overall setting of the site.

=== Potential archaeological features ===
There are no known potential archaeological elements on the station site with the exception of a remnant side platform and siding on the Down side. The recent findings during the widening of the Great Western Highway indicate the potential existence of surviving remnants of the former Goods Yard along the Highway. The Electrical Depot Site containing the substation and other associated structures may also have archaeological potential.

=== Condition ===
- Station Buildings and platform structures – Good
- Island Platform – Good
- Side Platform – No longer presents as a platform but in its garden bedlike form is in good condition
- Subway – generally Good condition
- Station Master's residence – Moderate externally, Very Poor internally
- Electrical Depot Site – Generally Good externally
- Signals and Earthworks Depot – Good externally
- Substation – Good

The station building and associated shed are intact externally and maintain their overall integrity. The Station Master's residence has lost most of its internal and some of its external fabric. Its integrity is therefore moderate. The buildings within the Electrical depot have a high level of integrity and intactness externally. While most equipment originally installed has been removed from the Substation the building is relatively intact despite the fire damage in 2003.

=== Modifications and dates ===
- 1970s: Mercury arc rectifiers in the substation replaced with solid state equipment
- 1994: Internal fabric of station building was altered.
- 2000: The collection of old electric metres were relocated to Strathfield Depot September.
- 2003: Substation damaged by fire.
- N.d: Modern platform canopy has been added. Modern platform fence and station seats. Roof extended over the platform entry to the pedestrian underpass. Brick screen to lavatory at east end of main building. Fence to underpass entry from platform. Side platform has been significantly modified and Down siding removed (in part) and covered with aggregate recently.
- N.d: The original roof of the Station Master's residence, with an ornate ridge, has been replaced at an unknown date; internally, virtually all original fabric has been removed.

=== Further information ===
Modern demountable buildings within the depot sites are excluded from the listing.

A (1907) Monier Arch overbridge lies outside the curtilage and is located northeast of the island platform. It consists of a concrete arch with abutments set in rock cutting. The bridge was widened in 2009. Excluded from listing.

Another 1907 Monier Arch bridge (used for pedestrian access) – 1 km east of station near Somers Street and GWH overbridge has separate S170 listing.

== Transport links ==
Blue Mountains Transit operates one bus route via Lawson station, under contract to Transport for NSW:

- 690K: Springwood to Katoomba

== Heritage listing ==
As at 9 November 2010, Lawson Railway Station Group is of state significance as an important railway location along the Main Western Line, with a historical role associated with locomotive servicing facilities and the change to electric traction at this part of the Blue Mountains. The place has research potential for its combination of buildings and structures, which demonstrate a large railway complex comprising railway station, accommodation, service, depot and administration facilities.

The station building demonstrates the period of line duplication across the Blue Mountains and is a good example of a standard 1902 Federation style design station building with matching detached shed. The Lawson Station Master's residence is significant for its ability in demonstrating the custom of providing accommodation for railway staff, and is a representative example of the simple architectural forms employed in other railway residences in NSW.

The buildings of the Electrical Depot including the former District Engineer's office and the associated stores and sheds have historical and research significance to demonstrate the former administration and railway electrical supply facilities along this section of the Blue Mountains. The Lawson substation is the last major rail electric substation built for the Sydney metropolitan network and the largest such building on the Main Western line between Penrith and Lithgow. While the original function of the building has been superseded by modern technology, the substation represents one of the final phases in the development of the electrified railway system for the Sydney Metropolitan area.

Lawson railway station was listed on the New South Wales State Heritage Register on 2 April 1999 having satisfied the following criteria.

The place is important in demonstrating the course, or pattern, of cultural or natural history in New South Wales.

Lawson Station Group is historically significant as part of the early station buildings built during the duplication of the Western rail line across the Blue Mountains combining a standard 1902 Federation style design station building and matching detached shed. It demonstrates the technological and engineering achievements in the early 1900s and is an important part of the townscape of the Lawson historic village and is highly visible from the main road.

The site has further historical significance due to its continued rail use since 1880, with the Station Master's cottage demonstrating the custom of providing accommodation for railway staff and the importance of the station as a key terminus for locomotive facilities with its large number of water columns and tanks. The Electrical Depot site demonstrates another major phase in the historical development of Lawson Station precinct featuring buildings built in the 1950s as part of the electrification of the railway to Lithgow. The substation is the last major rail electric substation built for the Sydney metropolitan network and the largest such building on the Main Western line between Penrith and Lithgow.

The place is important in demonstrating aesthetic characteristics and/or a high degree of creative or technical achievement in New South Wales.

Lawson Station Group is of aesthetic significance as a representative example of an intact Federation free classical style railway station, which has retained its former lamp building (Out of Shed) which is designed in the same style as the main station building. It is one of a group of stations built to the same pattern across the Blue Mountains following the duplication of the railway line.

The Station Master's residence has an unusual architectural style as it does not conform to any standard design although has similarities to a standard "J3" design. The buildings of the Electrical Depot including the former District Engineer's office and the associated stores and sheds collectively form a cohesive character within the landscape of the station precinct. The substation is a landmark in the precinct and rail corridor as well as the Great Western Highway.

The depot buildings have limited aesthetic or architectural value due to there utilitarian design.

The place has a strong or special association with a particular community or cultural group in New South Wales for social, cultural or spiritual reasons.

The place has the potential to contribute to the local community's sense of place and can provide a connection to the local community's history.

The place has potential to yield information that will contribute to an understanding of the cultural or natural history of New South Wales.

Lawson Station Group has research potential for its combination of buildings and structures that would provide information on the elements of the equipment contemporary with the electrification of the Main Western line over the Blue Mountains. The Electrical Depot contains a number of technically important electrical engineering equipment such as the large rectifier. The area along the Great Western Highway has potential for surviving remnants of the former goods yard and the former Down side platform and siding.

The place possesses uncommon, rare or endangered aspects of the cultural or natural history of New South Wales.

The Electrical Depot site is rare in the railway network, which includes the substation, one of a small number of such building and one of the largest remaining on the system.

The place is important in demonstrating the principal characteristics of a class of cultural or natural places/environments in New South Wales.

Lawson Station Group is a representative example of a standard design larger station building group demonstrating the construction techniques and characteristics of commonly used railway designs.

The Station Master's residence is a representative example of simple architectural forms of other similar railway residences.

The substation is a good example of rail substations built in Sydney after 1926 including Hurstville, Lewisham, Sutherland, Hornsby and Belmore.

== See also ==
- List of railway stations in New South Wales
