= Bedford Creek =

Coordinates: 33°47′S 150°29′E

Bedford
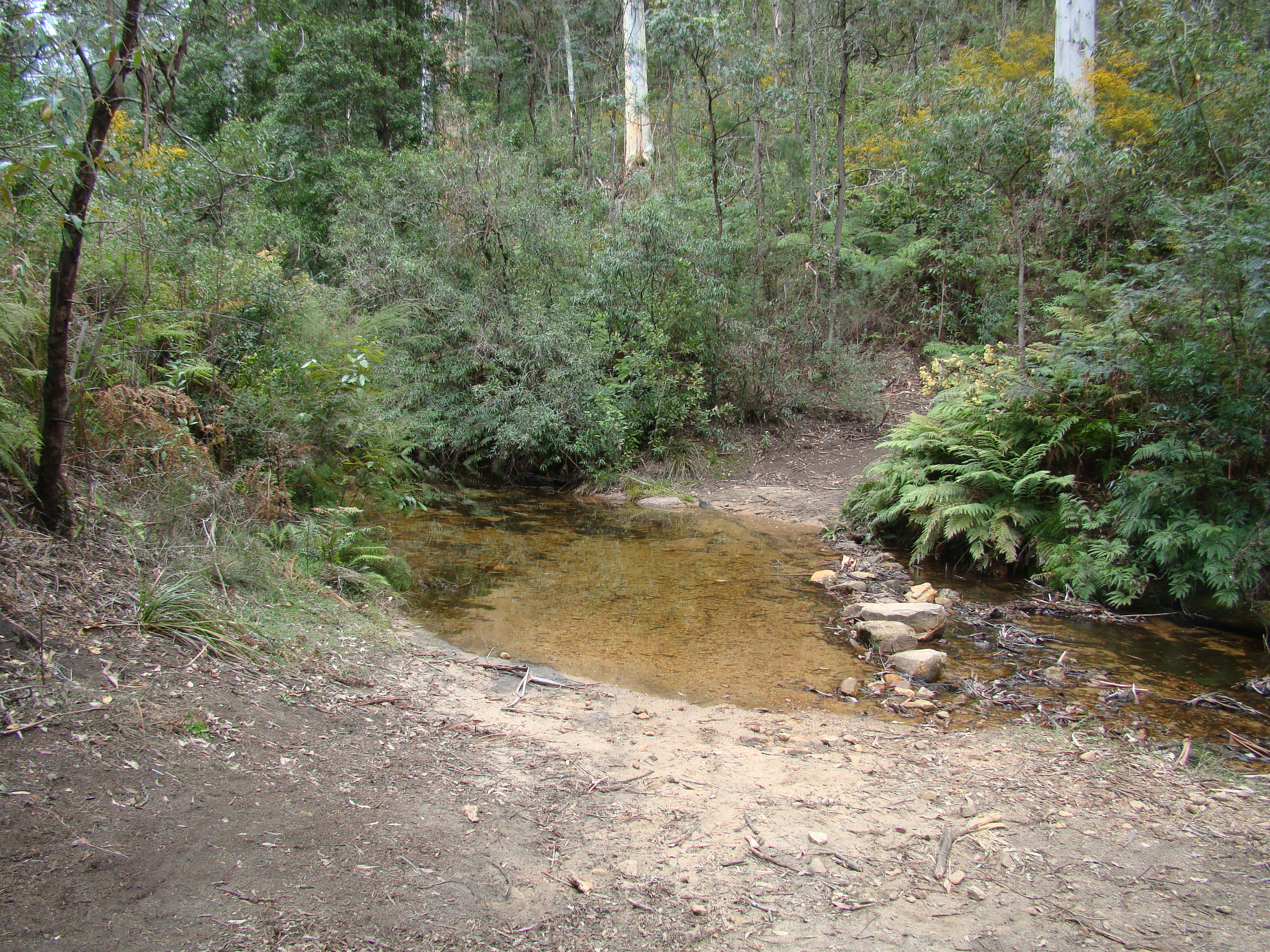

Location
- Country: Australia
- State: New South Wales
- Region: Sydney Basin (IBRA), Blue Mountains
- Municipality: City of Blue Mountains

Physical characteristics
- Source: Bodington Hill
  - location: between Bullaburra and Wentworth Falls
  - elevation: 590 m (1,940 ft)
- Mouth: confluence with Glen Erskine Creek to form the Erskine Creek
  - location: near Mount Gibson, south of Woodford
  - elevation: 323 m (1,060 ft)
- Length: 22 km (14 mi)

Basin features
- River system: Hawkesbury-Nepean catchment
- National park: Blue Mountains NP

The Bedford Creek, a perennial stream of the Hawkesbury-Nepean catchment, is located in the Blue Mountains region of New South Wales, Australia.

== Course ==
The Bedford Creek (officially designated as a river) rises near Bodington Hill, between Bullaburra and Wentworth Falls, and flows generally south-east and south, before reaching its confluence with the Glen Erskine Creek to form the Erskine Creek, in remote country south-east of Mount Gibson, south of Woodford. The river descends 267 metres (876 ft) over its 22-kilometre (14 mi) course.

The river is entirely contained within the world heritage-listed Blue Mountains National Park.

== See also ==
- List of rivers of Australia
- List of rivers of New South Wales (A–K)
- Rivers of New South Wales
