= Leura railway station =

Railway station in New South Wales, Australia

Leura
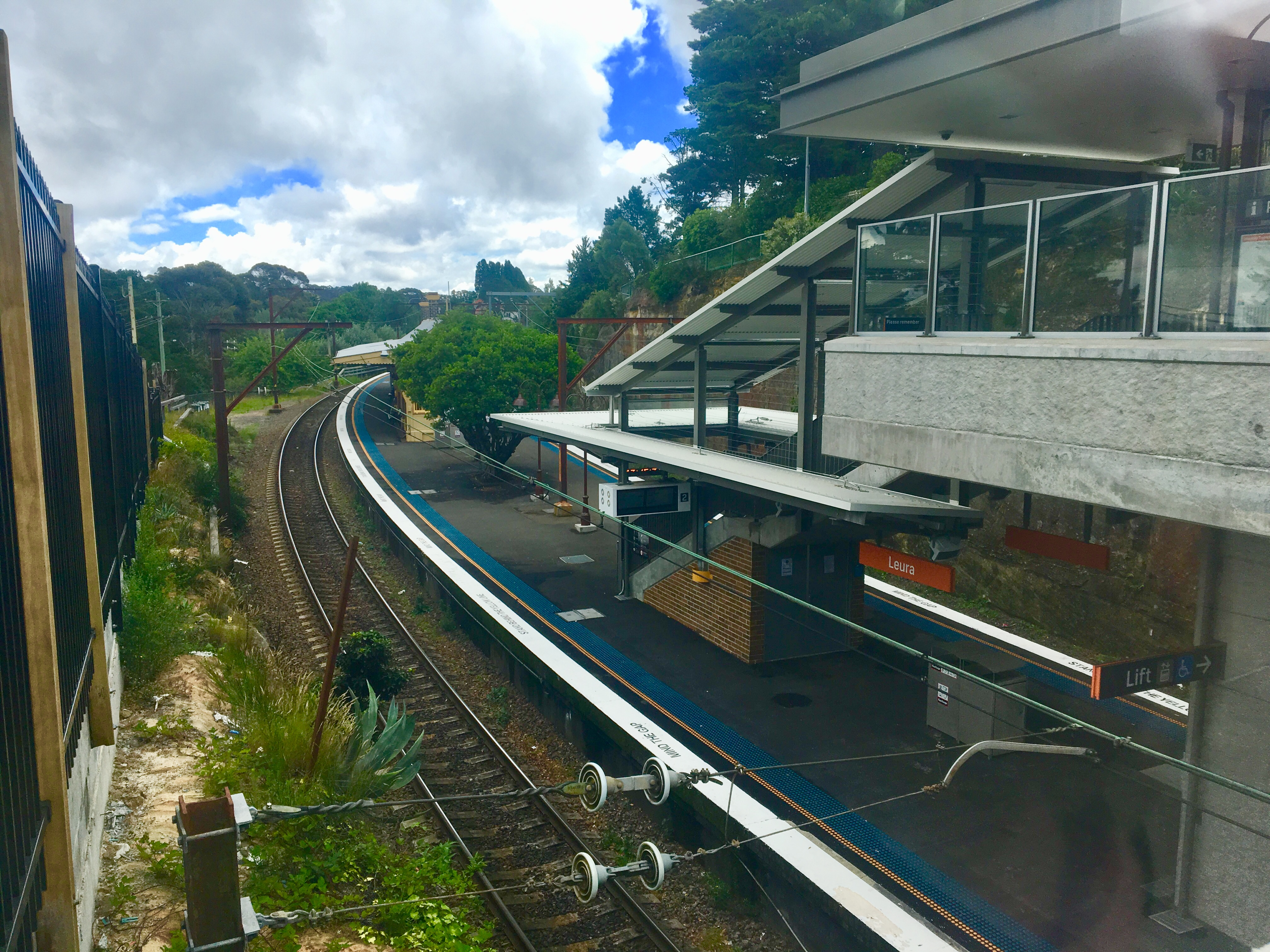
- Westbound view of the station platforms, December 2018

General information
- Location: Railway Parade, Leura; Australia
- Coordinates: 33°42′43″S 150°19′50″E
- Elevation: 988 metres (3,241 ft)
- Owner: Transport Asset Manager of New South Wales
- Operator: Sydney Trains
- Line: Main Western
- Distance: 107.59 kilometres (66.85 mi) from Central
- Platforms: 2 (1 island)
- Tracks: 2
- Connections: Bus

Construction
- Structure type: Ground
- Accessible: Yes

Other information
- Status: Weekdays: Staffed: 5.35am to 4.15pm: Weekends and public holidays: Unstaffed
- Station code: LEU
- Website: Transport for NSW

History
- Opened: 6 December 1890

Passengers
- 2025: 217,309 (year); 595 (daily) (Sydney Trains, NSW TrainLink)

Services
| Preceding station | Intercity Trains | Following station |
|---|---|---|
| Katoomba towards Lithgow | Blue Mountains Line | Wentworth Falls towards Central |
Location

Leura railway station is a heritage-listed railway station located on the Main Western line in New South Wales, Australia. It serves the Blue Mountains town of Leura opening on 6 December 1890.

== Platforms and services ==
Leura has one island platform with two sides. It is serviced by Sydney Trains Blue Mountains Line services travelling from Sydney Central to Lithgow.

| Platform | Line | Stopping pattern | Notes |
| 1 | Blue Mountains Line | services to Sydney Central | |
| 2 | Blue Mountains Line | services to Katoomba, Mount Victoria & Lithgow | |

== Transport links ==
Blue Mountains Transit operates three bus routes via Leura station, under contract to Transport for NSW:

- 685: North Wentworth Falls to Katoomba
- 690K: Springwood to Katoomba
- 695: South Leura to Katoomba
