= Lawson, New South Wales =

Lawson
- Suburb
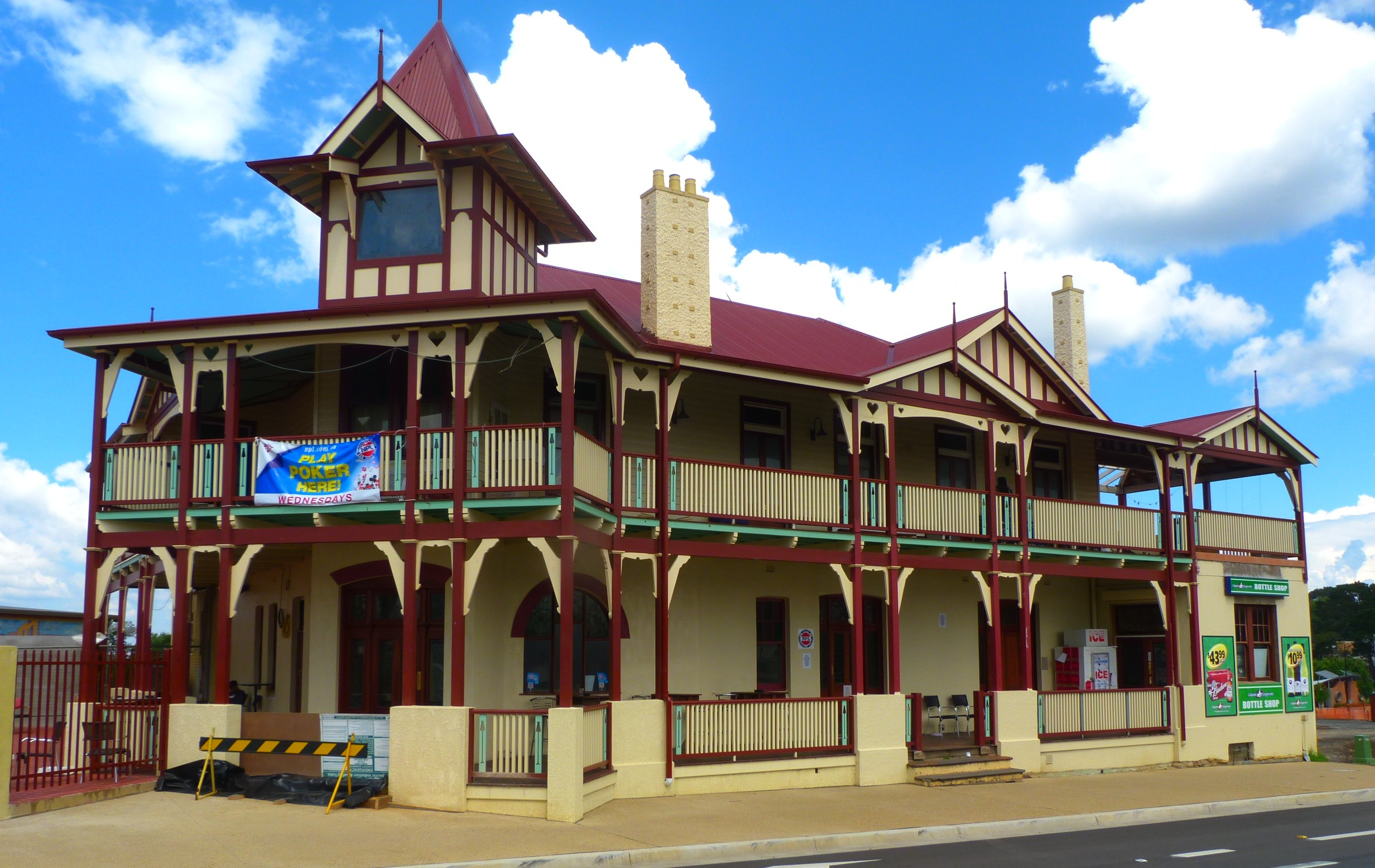
- Blue Mountain Hotel

- Interactive map of Lawson
- Coordinates: 33°43′10″S 150°25′47″E
- Country: Australia
- State: New South Wales
- City: Blue Mountains
- LGA: City of Blue Mountains
- Location: 93 km (58 mi) W of Sydney CBD; 13 km (8.1 mi) E of Katoomba

Government
  - State electorate: Blue Mountains
  - Federal division: Macquarie
- Elevation: 732 m (2,402 ft)

Population
  - Total: 2,651 (2021 census)
- Postcode: 2783
Suburbs around Lawson
| Blue Mountains National Park | Blue Mountains National Park | Hazelbrook |
| Bullaburra | Lawson | Hazelbrook |
| Bullaburra | | Hazelbrook |

Lawson is a town in the Blue Mountains area of New South Wales, Australia. It is located on the Great Western Highway between Hazelbrook in the east and Bullaburra in the west. Lawson has a station on the Main Western line. The town is also served by a public swimming pool and over the years has developed into the commercial hub of the mid-mountains area, which spans from Linden to Bullaburra, boasting a significant industrialized area as well as a shopping centre located on the south-eastern side of the highway.

== History ==
One of the first settlements on the eastern slopes of the Blue Mountains, Lawson was identified on early maps as 24 Mile Hollow–a name which was changed to Christmas Swamp for a few years. When the Blue Mountain Inn was opened in 1848, the locals adopted the name Blue Mountain for the village. This name was also given to the original railway station after the Main Western railway line was pushed through in 1867. The presence of a Blue Mountain on the Blue Mountains, however, became so confusing to visitors that the authorities stepped in and renamed the village Lawson in honour of William Lawson who, along with William Wentworth and Gregory Blaxland, were the first Europeans to cross the Blue Mountains in 1813. All three had namesake railway stations.

In 1931, the Railway Department agreed to supply electricity to the Blue Mountains Shire Council. Power lines were constructed between Blackheath and Lawson, accompanied by a maintenance track. The authorities then decided to promote the maintenance track as a walking trail; it became known as Bruce's Walk, after the surveyor who planned it. The track later became neglected and forgotten, until it was rediscovered and improved by bushwalkers in the 1980s. It can now be followed from Medlow Bath to the north side of Lawson, although it is not shown on the relevant topographic map.

In more recent years, Lawson was at the centre of controversy due to an ongoing government proposal to widen the Great Western Highway. The highway was a single lane in each direction through the town; the proposed plan by the Roads & Traffic Authority for widening necessitated the removal and relocation of the existing shops and the demolition of the Lawson Community Centre, formerly known as the Mechanics' Institute Hall, which dated back to 1903. Groups opposed to the demolition claimed the hall could be re-sited; others claimed this would be too costly, that the building was in poor repair and contained dangerous levels of asbestos. There was also a group lobbying for the retention of the shops on heritage grounds. By the end of 2008, the Community Centre had been saved.

== Heritage listings ==
Lawson has a number of heritage-listed sites, including:

- Blue Mountains National Park: Blue Mountains walking tracks.
- Main Western railway: Lawson railway station.
- Honour Avenue.

== Population ==
According to the 2021 census of Population, there were 2,651 people in Lawson.

- Aboriginal and Torres Strait Islander people made up 4.3% of the population.
- 79.4% of people were born in Australia. The next most common country of birth was England at 5.7%.
- 91.0% of people only spoke English at home.
- The most common responses for religion were No Religion 52.4%, Catholic 15.7% and Anglican 9.9%.

== Attractions ==
The walks in South Lawson can be accessed from several points along Honour Ave, within easy walk of the train station. This includes the South Lawson Waterfall Circuit, with four waterfalls: Adelina Falls, Cataract Falls, Federal Falls and Junction Falls. While not having the height of upper mountains waterfalls, the waterfall walk can be completed in 2-3 hours. On the north side of town beyond the swimming centre, walks take in Fairy Falls, Dante's Glen, St Michael's Falls, and Echo Bluff (sometimes referred to as Echo Point).

Community activities include: Magpie Markets at Lawson Public School are held on the third Sunday on most months (2nd Sunday December, no market in January) In November, the "Love Lawson Festival", later changed to the Mid Mountains Festival is held in conjunction with the Magpie Markets celebrating what is good about living in Lawson and the mid mountains.

The historic Lawson Community Hall (Mechanics Institute) built in 1903 has now reopened after a long battle to save it from demolition due to road widening, and is now the location of numerous community activities.

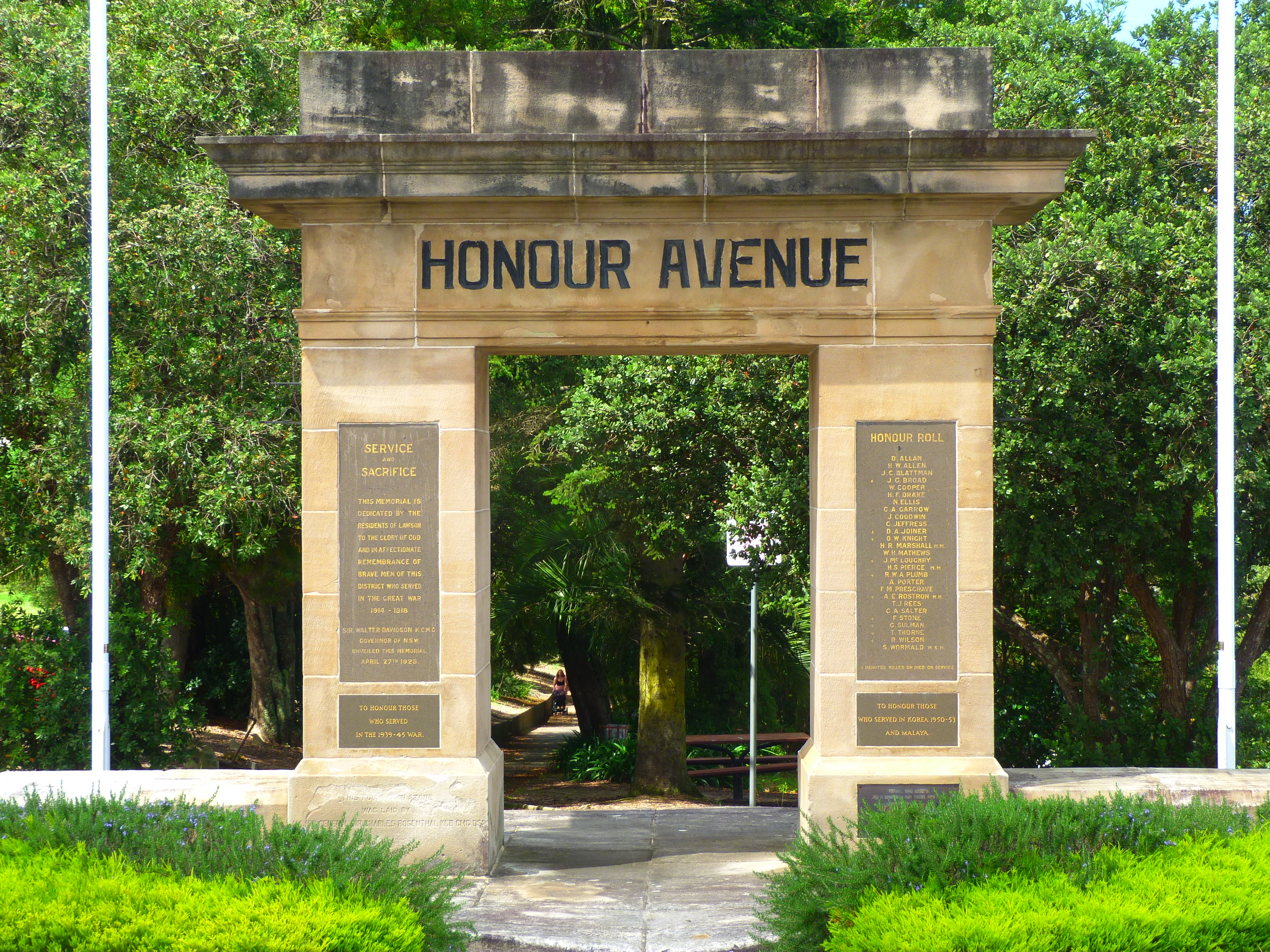
Honour Avenue

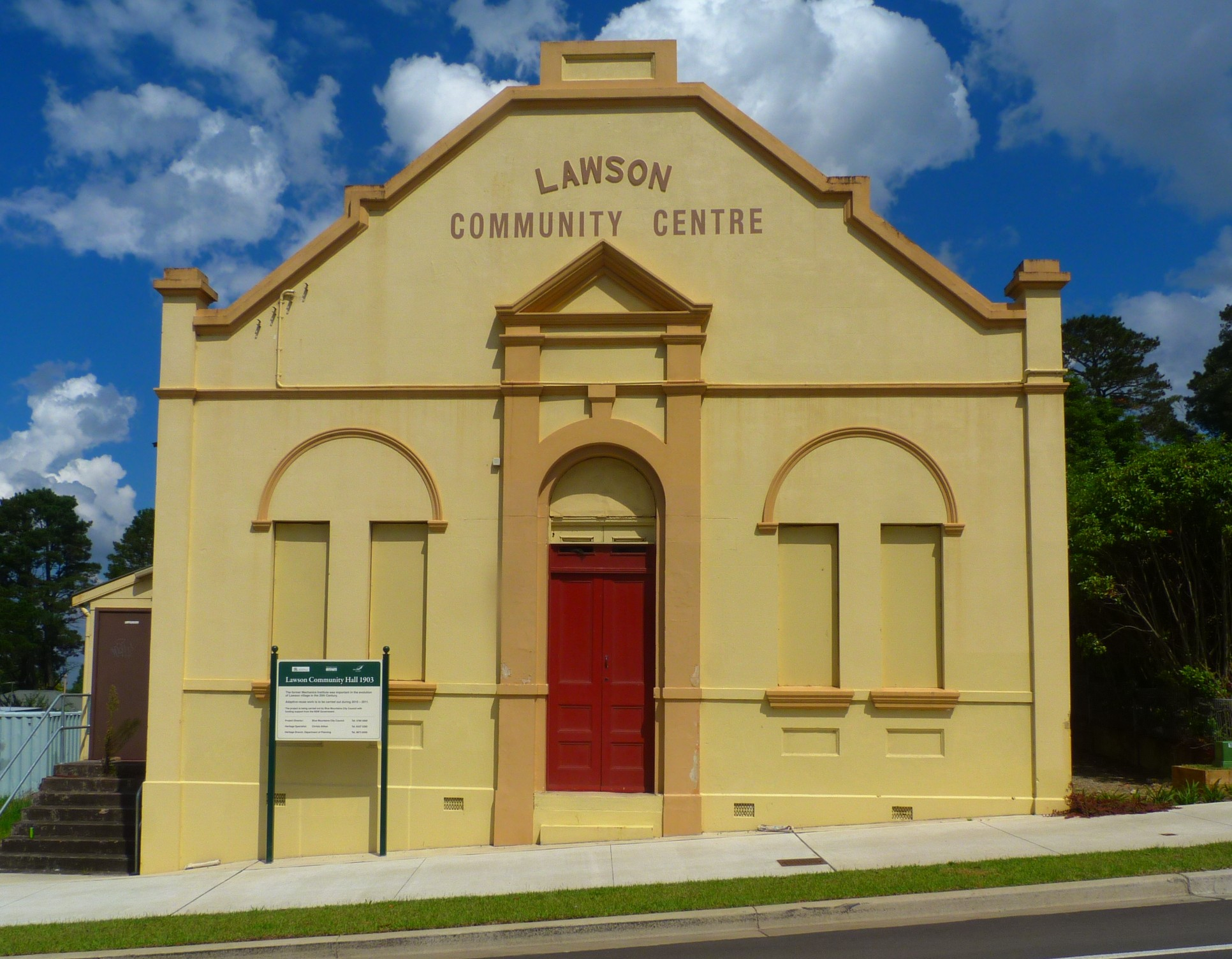
Lawson Community Centre (formerly Mechanics Institute)

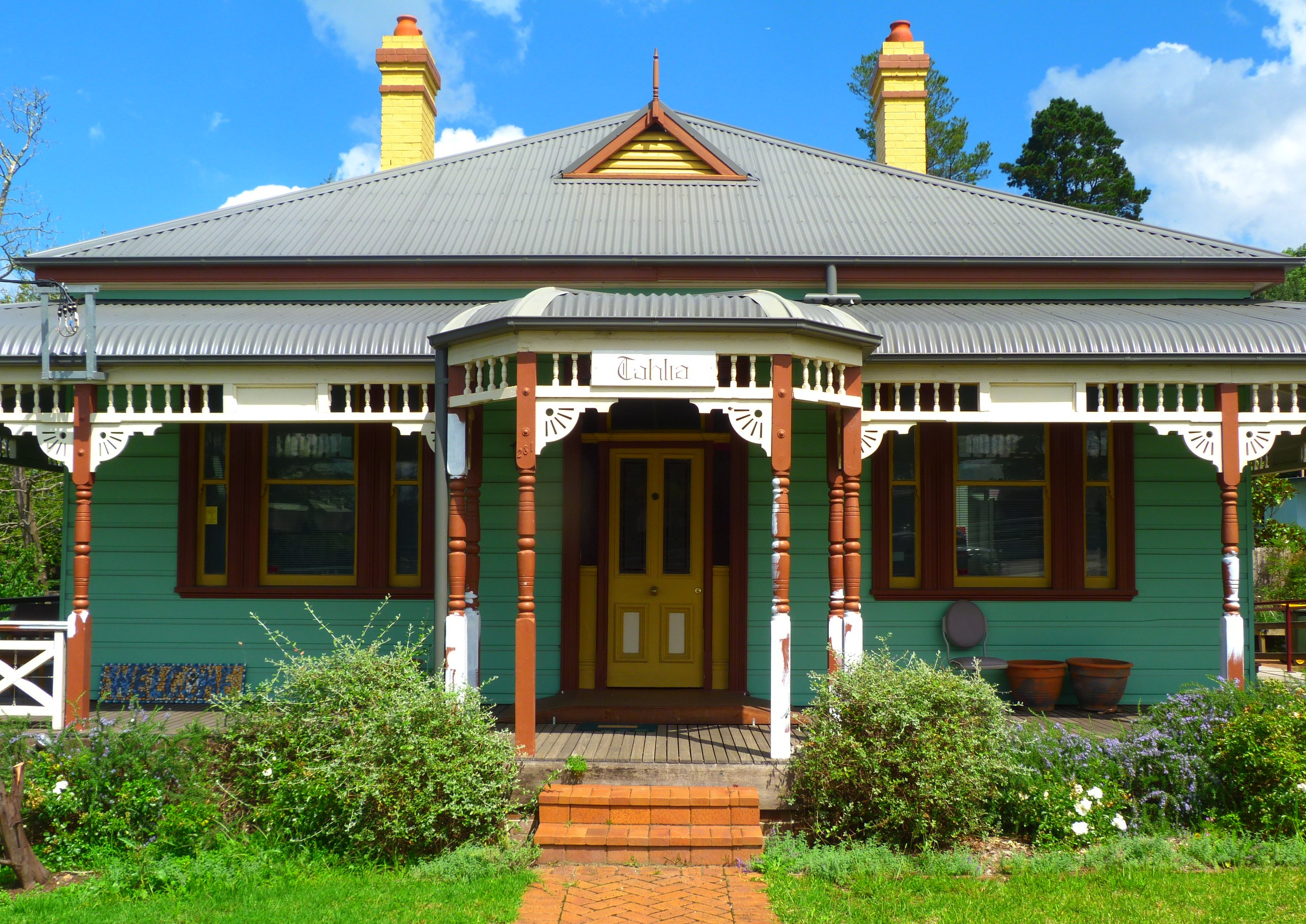
Tahlia, headquarters of Nepean Area Disabilities Organisation

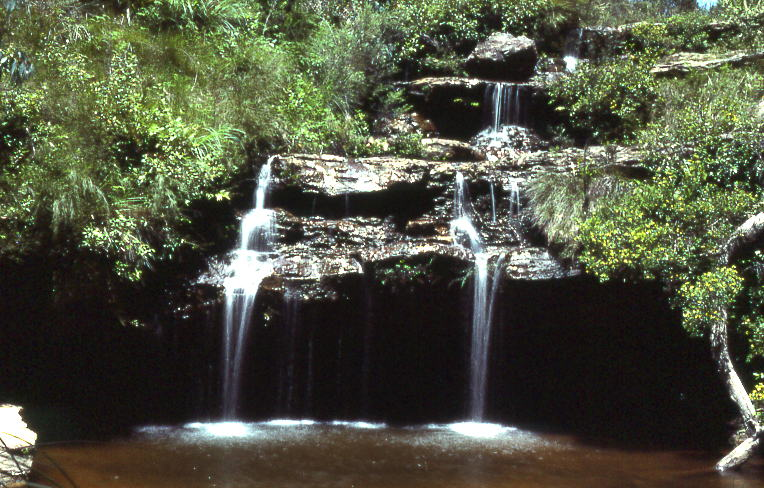
Frederica Falls, Lawson area

== See also ==
- Great Western Highway
- Blue Mountains (New South Wales)
