= South Lawson Waterfall Circuit =

Walking track in New South Wales, Australia

Coordinates: 33°43′35″S 150°26′15″E

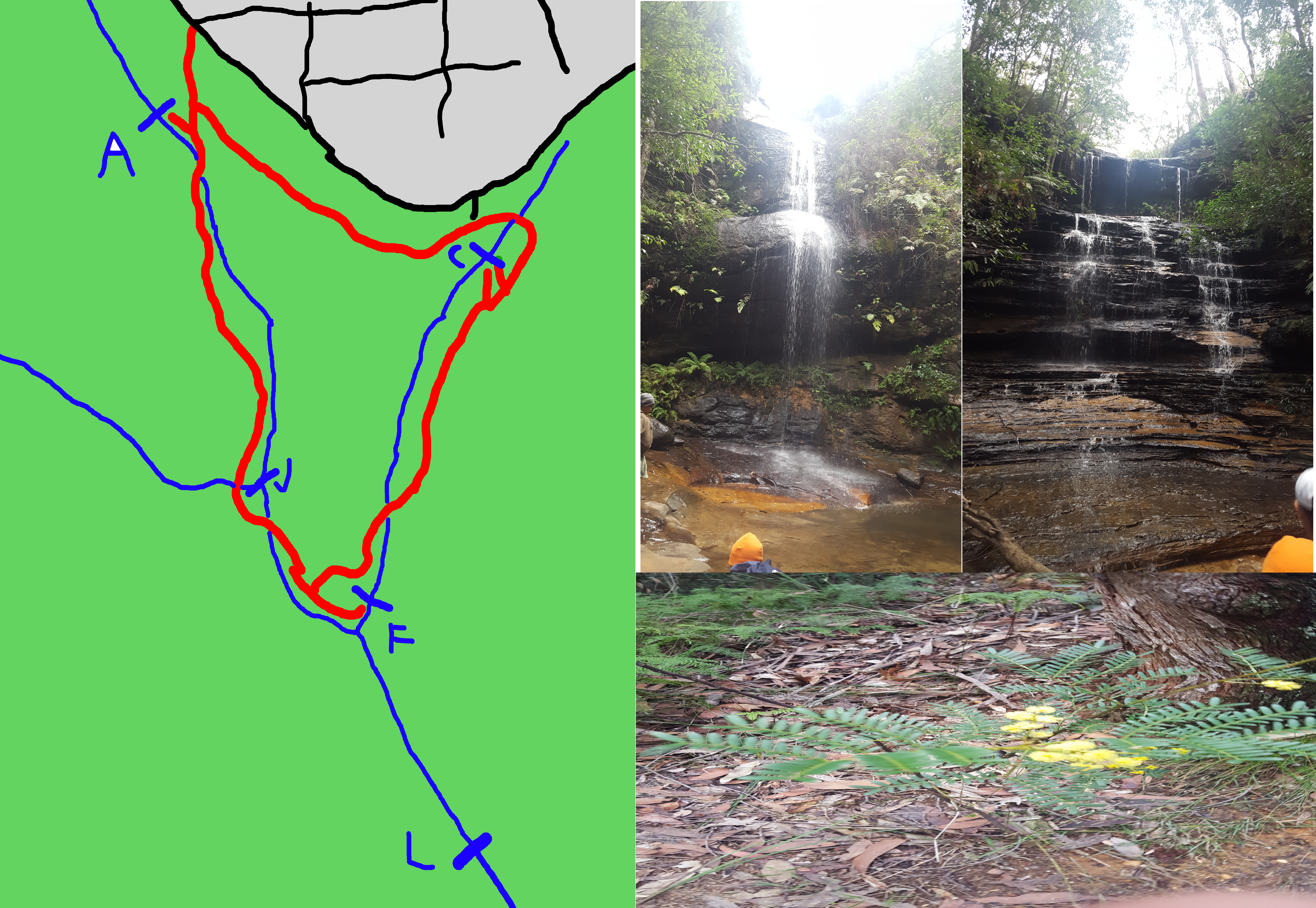
- Left: A map of the walk, marked in red Right: Adelina Falls, Junction Falls and a wattle along the track

South Lawson Waterfall Circuit
- Length: 2.6 km (1.6 mi)
- Location: South Lawson Park, New South Wales, Australia
- Established: 1878
- Use: hiking, recreation
- Highest point: Northern Carpark
- Lowest point: Leslie Falls
- Difficulty: Easy–medium
- Season: Autumn
- Sights: Federal Falls, Cataract Falls
- Surface: natural
- Maintainer: Blue Mountains City Council

The South Lawson Waterfall Circuit, officially the South Lawson Circular Waterfall Track or colloquially the Five Waterfall Walk, is a walking track in Lawson, New South Wales, Australia. It is a 2.6 kilometres (1.6 mi) track that bypasses five waterfalls and a sixth waterfall off the track. The landscape and biome changes a lot in the walk, ranging from wet, temperate forest, to dry forest with blue gums and wildflowers around the track. The track follows the banks of Lawson and Cataract Creek, and crosses Ridge Creek once. The track is rated as easy to medium, with a Grade 2. It has an elevation gain of 117 metres (384 ft) along the track.

== Overview ==
A video showing a brief walk of the circuit, with an eastern whipbird calling at the end

Just south of the town of Lawson in the Blue Mountains, the South Lawson Waterfall Circuit is a popular walk in the town. The whole walk is in a temperate biome, and has a large diversity of fauna, including the musky rat-kangaroo, eastern whipbird and superb lyrebird. There is also a wide diversity of flora, including the golden wattle, fern, and the blue and red gums. The walk is dog-friendly, as it is owned by the Blue Mountains City Council, not the NPWS. Therefore, it is not a national park.

== History ==
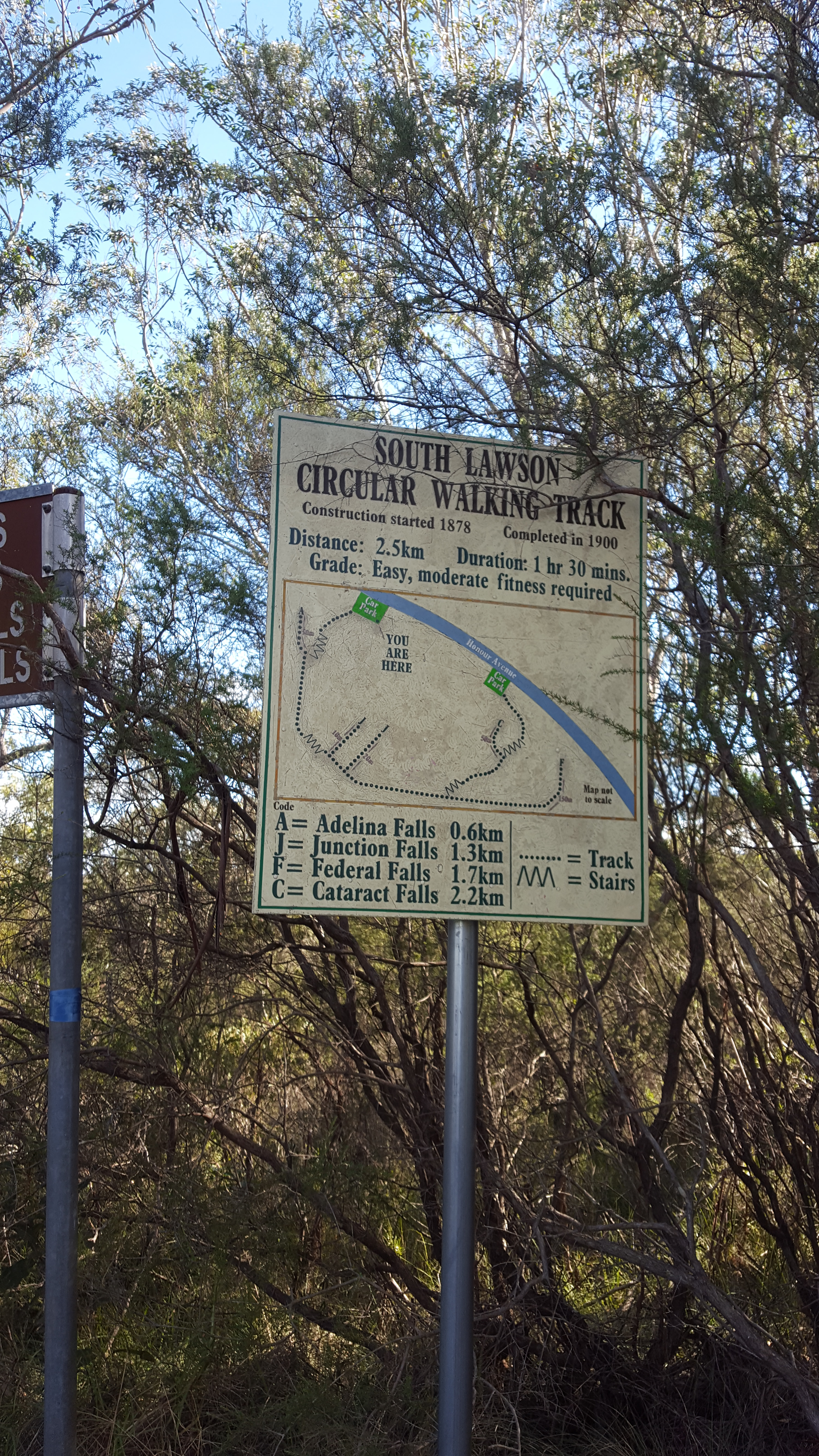
A sign showing a map and a brief history recount at the northern entrance of the walk

In the late 1800s, early European settlers recognised the area as a natural wonder and started cutting the track in 1878. Earlier, in 1876, the settlers established the first reserves around the area of the falls, for public viewing. During the construction of the trail, they initially built bridges across the streams, but they were destroyed in floods or wildfires. Today, bolts and remnants of wood of the bridges can still be found in the creek crossings. Construction of the track finished in 1900.

== Description ==
The track is ranked at a Grade 2 on the Australian Walking Track Grading System. One half of the track follows the banks of Lawson Creek, while the other half has a steep ascent at first, and then follows Cataract Creek. There are two carparks to the north and south, each one of these on Honour Avenue, the main road in Lawson. The walk is directly south-west from the southern residential area of Lawson, the two areas only being separated by Honour Ave.

== Location ==
The circuit is located due south-west of Hazelbrook, and a track leading east after Cataract Falls links the South Lawson Waterfall Circuit with the South Hazelbrook Waterfall Circuit, which consists of Terrace Falls, Bedford Pool and Victor Falls. Three small waterways run along the circuit, the Lawson, Cataract and Ridge Creeks.

== Access ==
The walk can be accessed from the centre of Lawson via Honour Avenue. The Great Western Highway also provides access to the track from Sydney or Katoomba. The Blue Mountains Line provides public transport to the trail.

== Waterfall list ==
- Adelina Falls
- Junction Falls
- Junction Falls II
- Federal Falls
- Cataract Falls
- Leslie Falls (lesser known and not widely regarded to be in the track)

== See also ==
- Katoomba Falls
- Govetts Leap Falls
