= Bullaburra railway station =

Railway station in New South Wales, Australia

Bullaburra
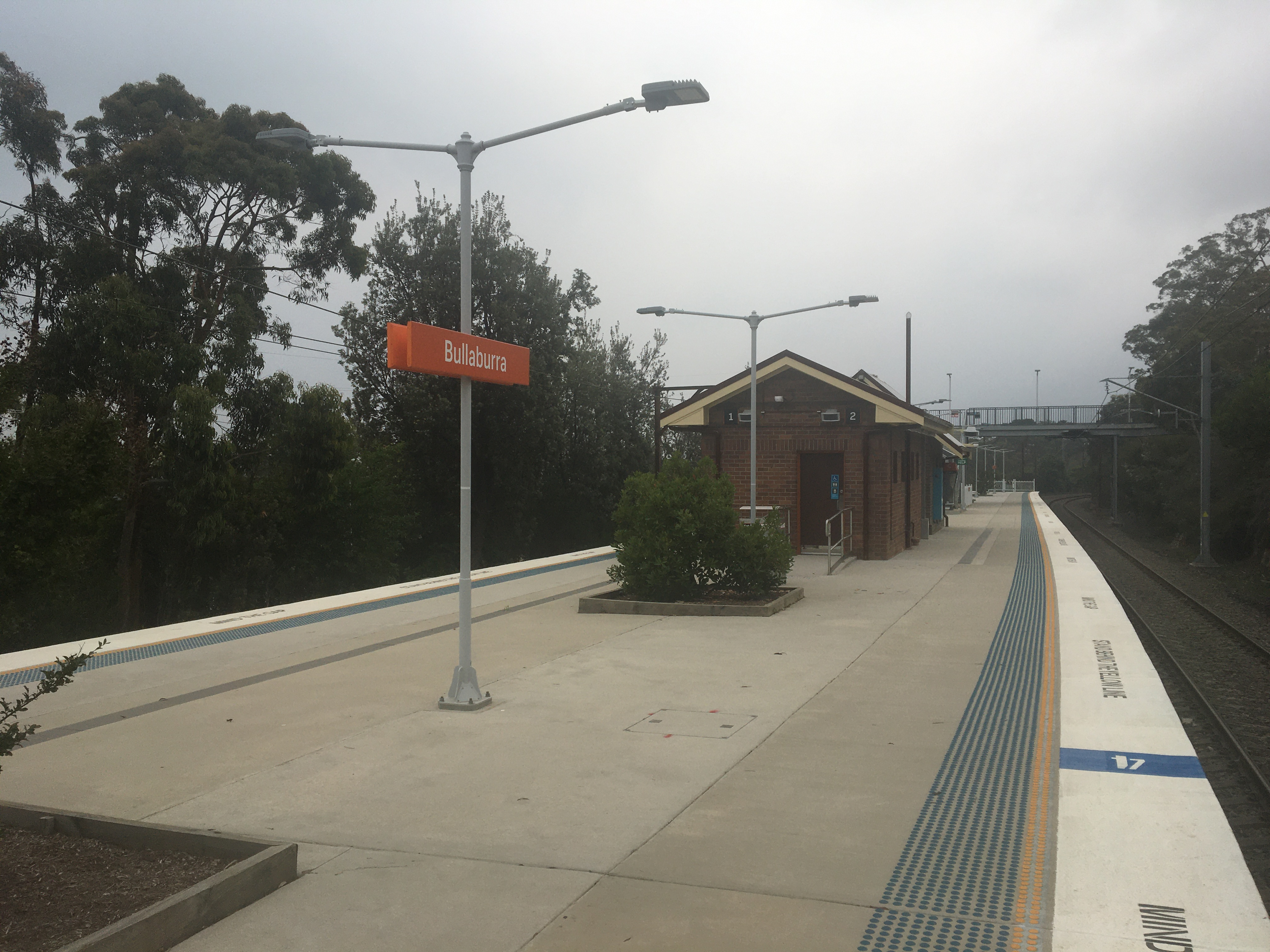
- Eastbound view from Platform 2, December 2019

General information
- Location: Great Western Highway, Bullaburra; Australia
- Coordinates: 33°43′25″S 150°24′53″E
- Elevation: 765 metres (2,510 ft)
- Owner: Transport Asset Manager of New South Wales
- Operator: Sydney Trains
- Line: Main Western
- Distance: 97.69 kilometres (60.70 mi) from Central
- Platforms: 2 (1 island)
- Tracks: 2
- Connections: Bus

Construction
- Structure type: Ground

Other information
- Status: Weekdays: Staffed: 5.45am to 8.35am: Weekends and public holidays: Unstaffed
- Station code: BUB
- Website: Transport for NSW

History
- Opened: 16 February 1925

Passengers
- 2025: 24,095 (year); 66 (daily) (Sydney Trains, NSW TrainLink)

Services
Preceding station	Intercity Trains	Following station
Wentworth Falls towards Lithgow	Blue Mountains Line	Lawson towards Central
Location

Bullaburra railway station is a heritage-listed railway station located on the Main Western line in New South Wales, Australia. It serves the Blue Mountains town of Bullaburra opening on 16 February 1925.

== Platforms and services ==
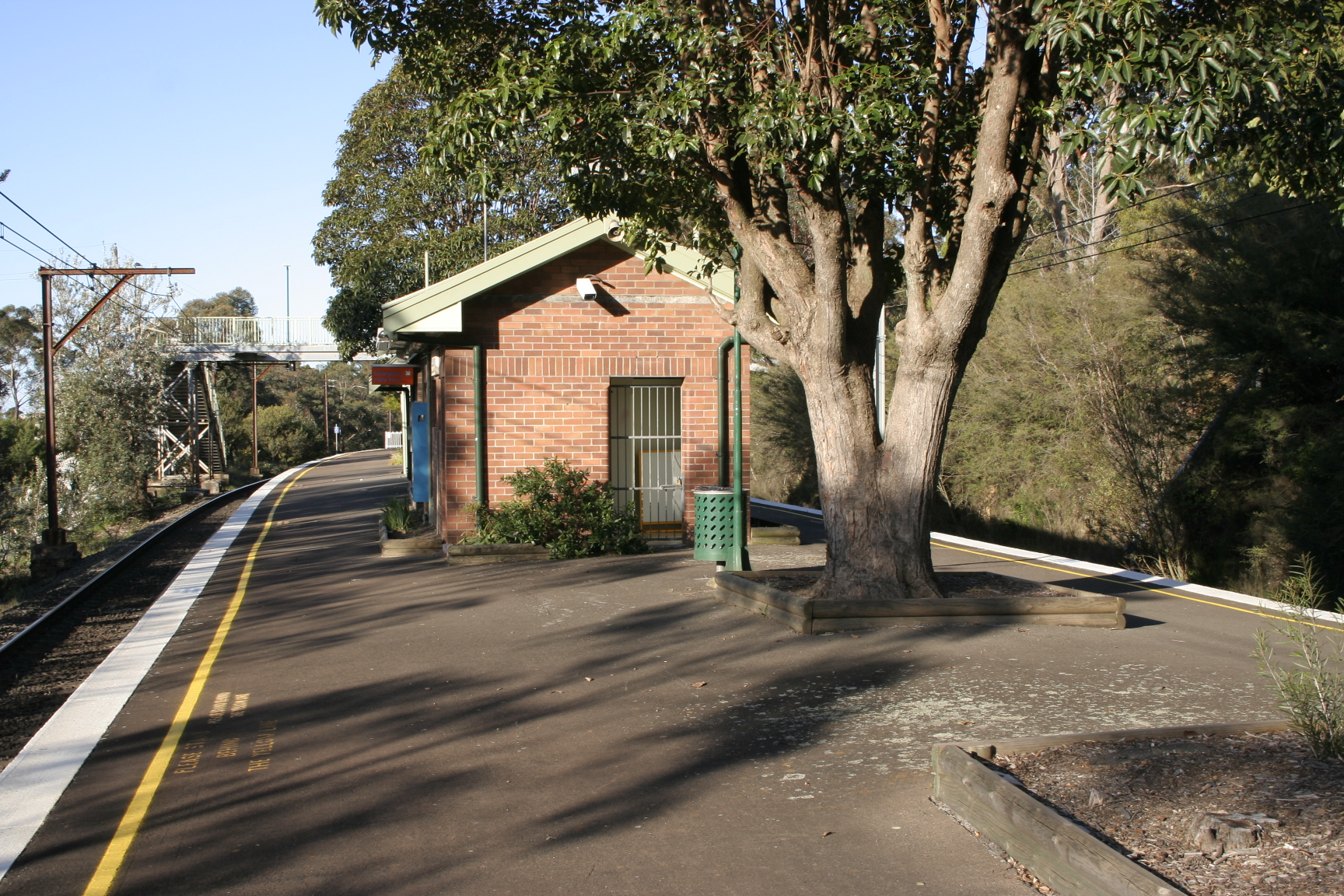
Eastbound view in September 2007

Bullaburra has one island platform with two sides. It is serviced by Sydney Trains Blue Mountains Line services travelling from Sydney Central to Lithgow.

Platform	Line	Stopping pattern	Notes
1	Blue Mountains Line	services to Sydney Central	
2	Blue Mountains Line	services to Katoomba, Mount Victoria & Lithgow	

== Transport links ==
Blue Mountains Transit operates one bus route via Bullaburra station, under contract to Transport for NSW:

- 690K: Springwood to Katoomba
