= Federal Falls =

Waterfall in Lawson, NSW

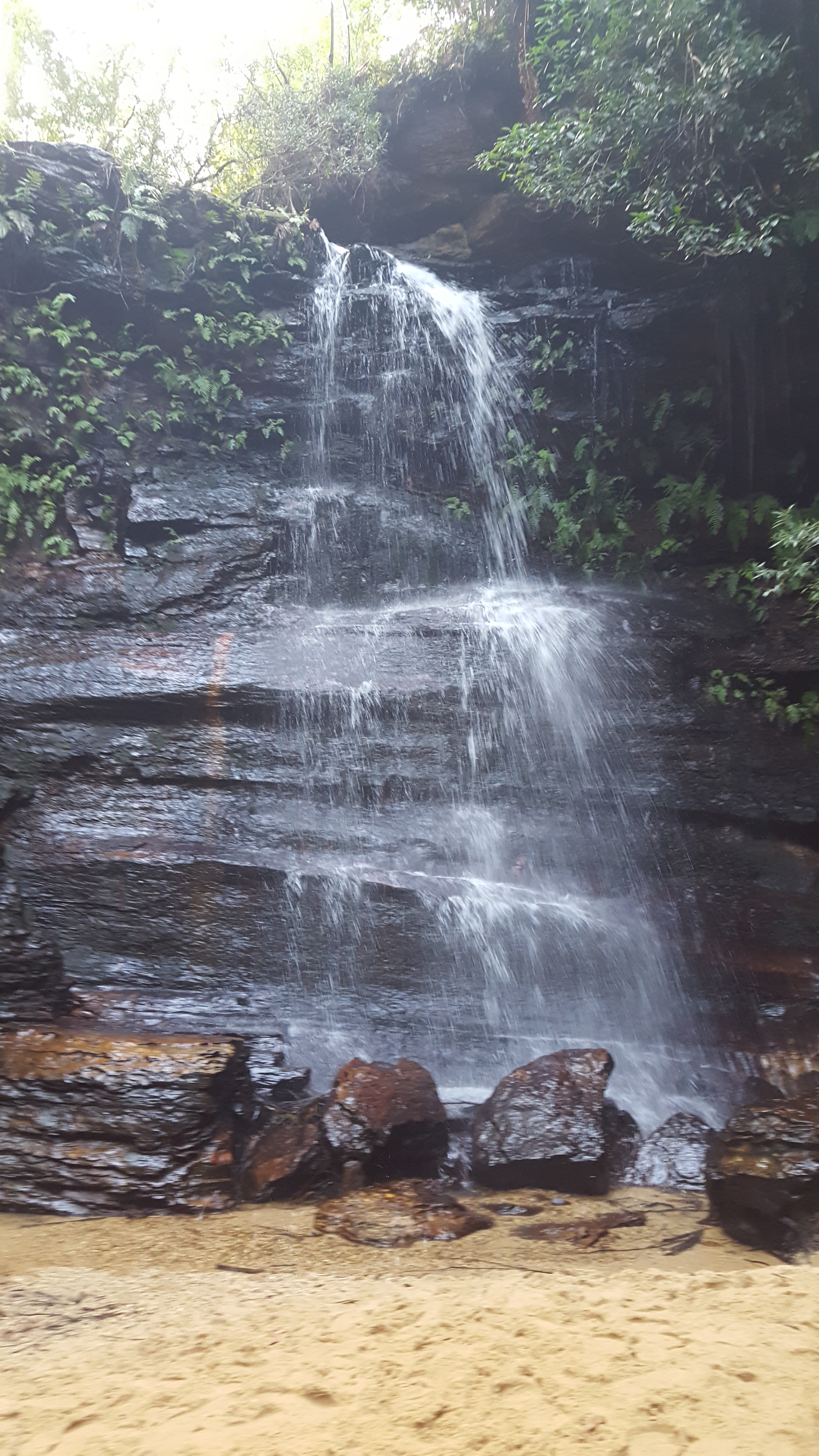
- Federal Falls from its base.

- Location within New South Wales
- Location: Blue Mountains, New South Wales, Australia
- Coordinates: 33°44′05.5″S 150°26′22.3″E
- Watercourse: Cataract Creek

Federal Falls, originally Hay's Cascades, is a curtain ledge waterfall located near the town of Lawson, New South Wales, Australia. It is part of the South Lawson Waterfall Circuit, and is accessed from a 1 kilometre (0.62 mi) track from Adelina Falls. It is the fourth and furthest away falls from Lawson in the whole circuit.

== Overview ==
Accessed from a 1.1 kilometres (0.68 mi) track from the entrance point of the South Lawson Waterfall Circuit, it is the shortest fall in the circuit. The falls were discovered in the late-1800s, and was named in 1911, originally being called Hay's Cascade. It is a small fall with some rocks and a beach at the base.

== Location ==
Federal Falls runs along its watercourse, Cataract Creek. The falls are 0.3 kilometres (0.19 mi) from the nearby Junction Falls. It is also just north of the junction of Cataract and Lawson Creek. South of the falls, along Lawson Creek, is Leslie Falls, the optional sixth fall of the circuit.

== Description ==
Directly below the falls, lies a small beach, which guides Cataract Creek to the junction to the south. The falls reside in a small canyon, with a track junction to the west of the falls. It is also the second-lowest point in the South Lawson Waterfall Circuit, followed by Leslie Falls, which is to the south. The falls are also an opportunity for birdwatching, as there are many different bird species around the falls.

== See also ==
- List of waterfalls
- List of waterfalls in Australia
