= Junction Falls =

Waterfall in Lawson, NSW

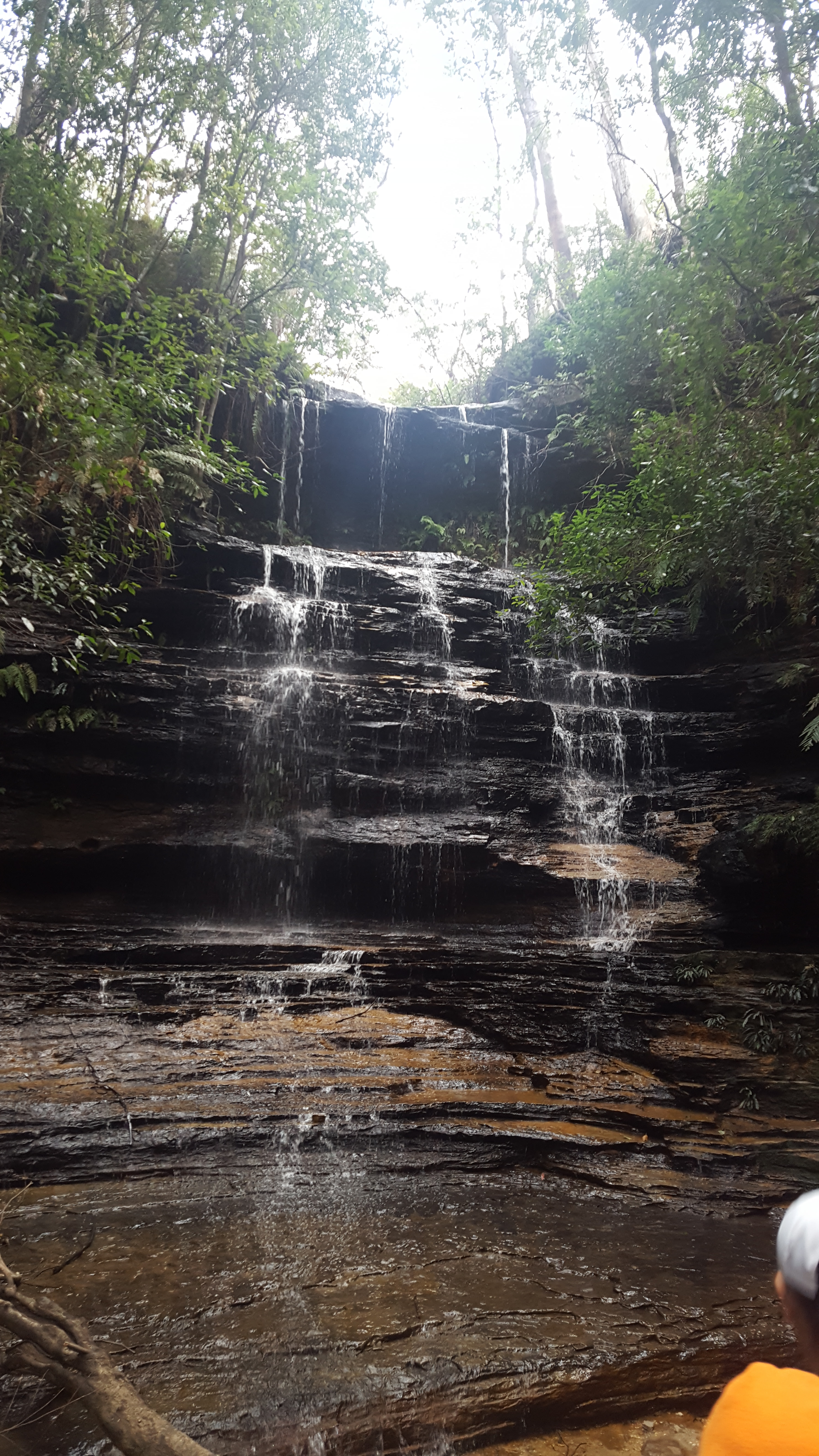
- The first fall from its base

- Location within New South Wales
- Location: Blue Mountains, New South Wales, Australia
- Coordinates: 33°43′59.1″S 150°26′17.3″E
- Watercourse: Ridge Creek and Lawson Creek

Junction Falls are two staircase waterfalls located within the South Lawson Waterfall Circuit, in Lawson, New South Wales. They are the second and third falls in the circuit, and are accessed from a 0.9-kilometre (0.56 mi) trail from the Northern Trailhead/Carpark of the circuit. The two falls are named Junction due to them being at the junction of Ridge Creek and Lawson Creek.

== Overview ==
Junction Falls are located in the South Lawson Waterfall Circuit, 0.9 kilometres (0.56 mi) from the northern carpark, and consists of two waterfalls at the junction of Ridge and Lawson Creek. Eastern whipbirds and musky rat-kangaroos are found in the track near Junction Falls, and many blue gums are also present.

== Description ==
=== Junction Falls I ===
The bottom of the first Junction Falls has clay exposed, due to the erosion of the rock underneath. Near the base of the falls, there is a rock with a small plaque, dedicated to a hiker who died in Slovenia, Prue Angell. It read that the Five Waterfall Walk was her favourite walk. There is a small footbridge across Lawson Creek to the south of the falls.

=== Junction Falls II ===
The second fall of Junction Falls, Junction Falls II, is located shortly due east of the main falls, and has a small overhang directly below the falls. Ferns and other Australian native plants are above the falls. The watercourse of Junction Falls II ends just after the footbridge over Lawson Creek.

== Location ==
Junction Falls is located at the junction of the Ridge and Lawson Creeks, hence the name. It is 0.9 kilometres (0.56 mi) from the Northern Trailhead, and is 0.3 kilometres (0.19 mi) from Federal Falls. North of the falls, there is an unmarked track branching off from the main track leading to the top of the first fall.

== See also ==
- List of waterfalls
- List of waterfalls in Australia
