= Cataract Falls (Blue Mountains) =

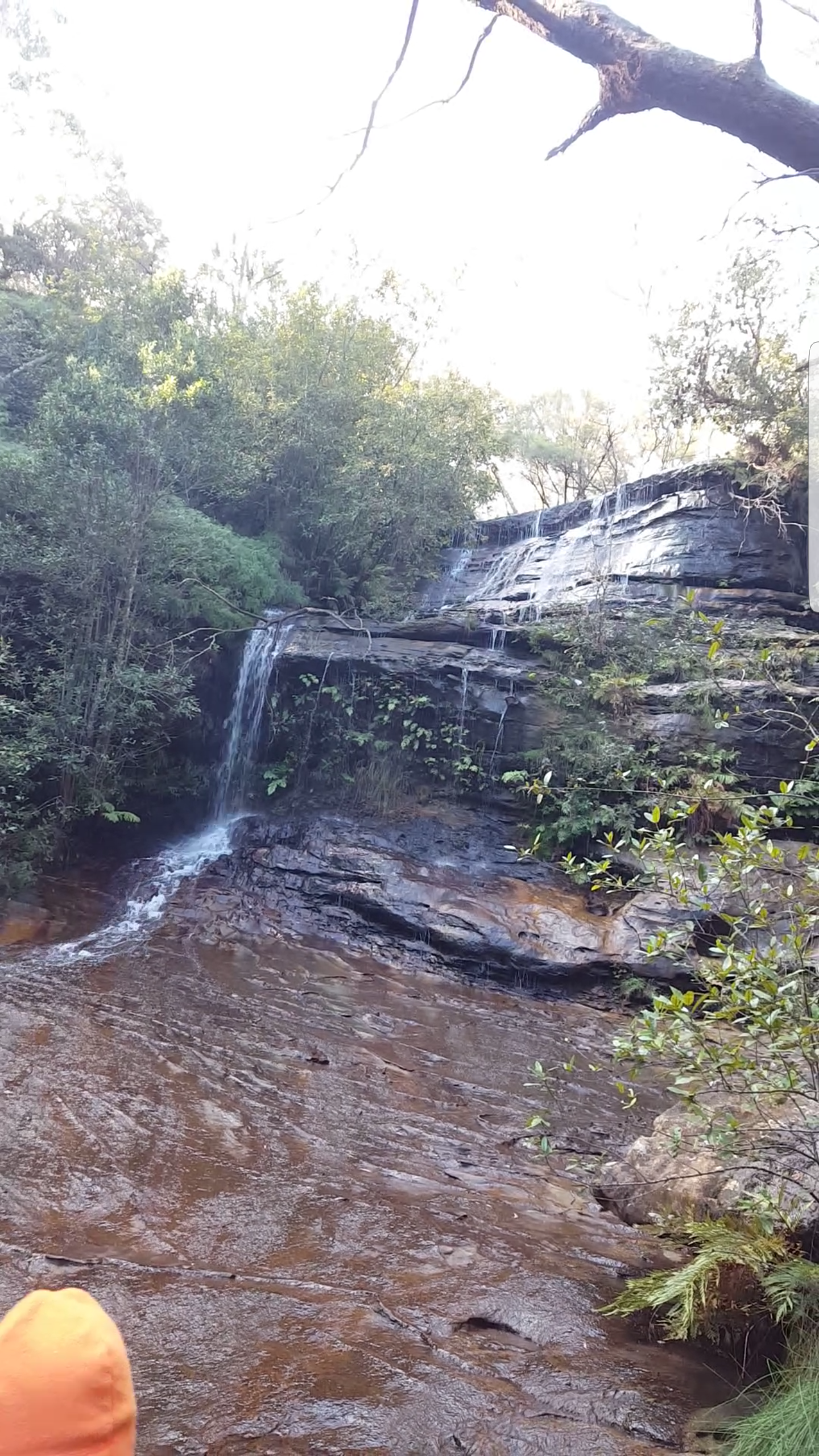
- The medium level of Cataract Falls. The upper level can be seen below the top cascade.

- Location within New South Wales
- Location: Blue Mountains, NSW, Australia
- Coordinates: 33°43′50.1″S 150°26′33.5″E
- Watercourse: Cataract Creek

Cataract Falls is a multilevel staircase waterfall located near the town of Lawson in New South Wales, Australia. It is part of the South Lawson Waterfall Circuit, and is accessed from a 0.7 kilometres (0.43 mi) track from the Northern Carpark of the track. The falls have three major levels, two of which can be accessed from the tracks.

== Overview ==
Accessed from a 0.1 kilometres (0.062 mi) track from the southern carpark of the South Lawson Waterfall Circuit, Cataract Falls is the tallest fall in the circuit, due to the fact that it is multilevelled. It is also the only multilevel fall in the circuit. It is the last fall in the circuit. The levels can be accessed by two tracks along Cataract Creek.

== Location ==
Cataract Falls is located a few kilometres north of the confluence of the Cataract and Lawson Creeks, on the midway point of Cataract Creek. The falls are 0.1 kilometres (0.062 mi) from the Southern Carpark, near the management trail connecting it to the Northern Carpark.

== Description ==
Cataract Falls has three levels. The lower level is approximately 10 metres (33 ft) tall, and has a small plunge pool below. This can be accessed from an off-branching track, which goes under an overhang, and to the lower level.

The medium level is the picturesque one. It is accessed from an ascending track, which ends just before the orange clay rock slab of the medium level. The medium level is the place where the water from the top level splits at the orange slabs. The slab is extremely slippery.

The top level is the smallest level, and the only one without access. Ferns and other plants thrive on this level. The top level can be seen from the medium level viewpoint.

== See also ==
- List of waterfalls
- List of waterfalls in Australia
