= Wentworth Falls railway station =

Railway station in New South Wales, Australia

Wentworth Falls
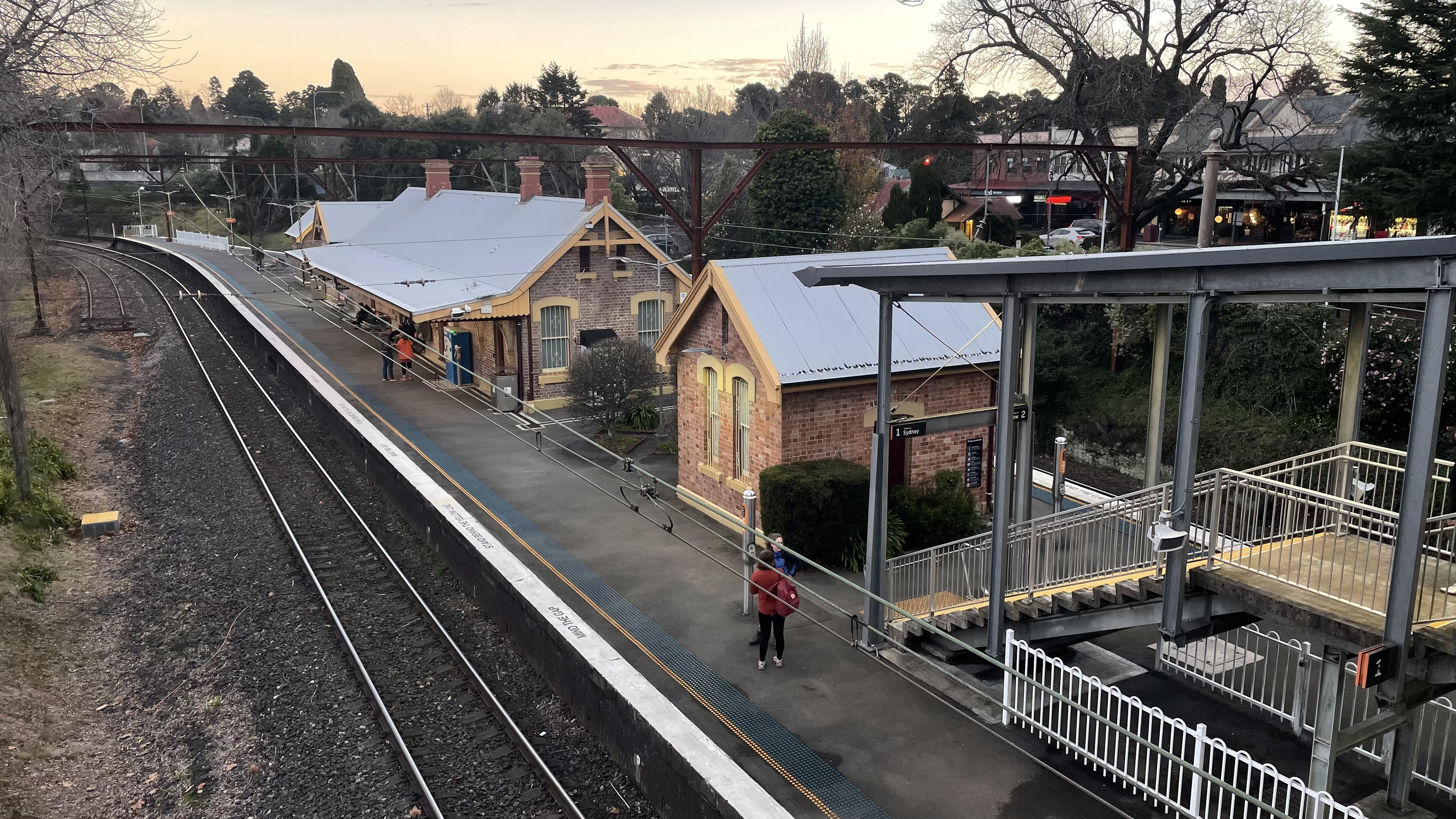
- Eastbound view of the station platforms, June 2024

General information
- Location: Station Street, Wentworth Falls, New South Wales; Australia
- Coordinates: 33°42′36″S 150°22′35″E
- Elevation: 872 metres (2,861 ft)
- Owner: Transport Asset Manager of New South Wales
- Operator: Sydney Trains
- Line: Main Western
- Distance: 102.61 kilometres (63.76 mi) from Central
- Platforms: 2 (1 island)
- Tracks: 2
- Connections: Bus

Construction
- Structure type: Ground
- Accessible: Yes

Other information
- Status: Weekdays: Staffed: 5.35am to 3.30pm: Weekends and public holidays: Unstaffed
- Station code: WFS
- Website: Transport for NSW

History
- Opened: 22 July 1867
- Former names: Weatherboard (1867–1879)

Passengers
- 2025: 180,638 (year); 495 (daily) (Sydney Trains, NSW TrainLink)

Services
Preceding station	Intercity Trains	Following station
Leura towards Lithgow	Blue Mountains Line	Bullaburra towards Central
Leura towards Lithgow	Blue Mountains Line Limited express	Hazelbrook towards Central
Location

Wentworth Falls railway station is a heritage-listed railway station located on the Main Western line in New South Wales, Australia. It serves the Blue Mountains town of Wentworth Falls opening on 22 July 1867 as Weatherboard, being renamed Wentworth Falls on 21 April 1879.

In 1902, it was converted to an island platform when the line was duplicated. A passing loop previously existed north of Platform 1 but has been disconnected from the main line.

Transport Heritage NSW celebrated 150 years of the railway with a weekend of events in July 2017.

== Upgrade ==
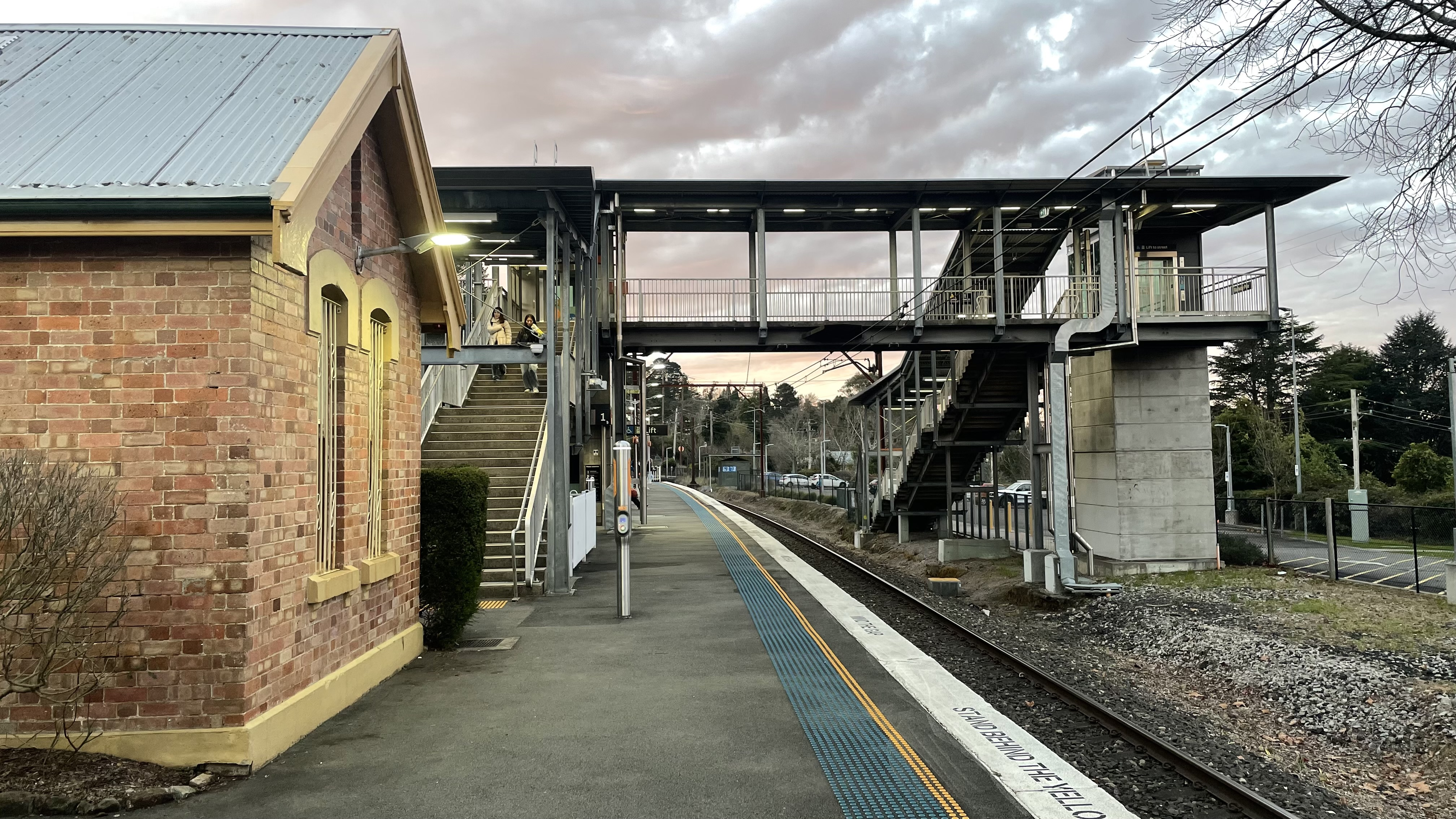
Footbridge as seen from Platform 1

In May 2013, a major upgrade for Wentworth Falls was announced as part of the Transport Access Program. In 2014, the station building was restored, with the ochre paint removed to return it to bare brick.

In December 2014, designs for the major transformation were released, including three lifts, a covered walkway and bike parking facilities. Subject to community feedback, planning approval and contract award, work will start in the first half of 2015. In May 2015, it was announced that the plans had been approved and that tenders were being assessed.

Completion of the upgrade saw the lifts opened on Monday 19 June 2017.

== Platforms and services ==
Wentworth Falls has one island platform with two sides. It is serviced by Sydney Trains Blue Mountains Line services travelling from Sydney Central to Lithgow.

Platform	Line	Stopping pattern	Notes
1	Blue Mountains Line	services to Sydney Central	
2	Blue Mountains Line	services to Katoomba, Mount Victoria & Lithgow	

== Transport links ==
Blue Mountains Transit operates two bus routes via Wentworth Falls station, under contract to Transport for NSW:

- 685: North Wentworth Falls to Katoomba
- 690K: Springwood to Katoomba
