= Bullaburra =

Coordinates: 33°43′33″S 150°24′46″E

- Suburb
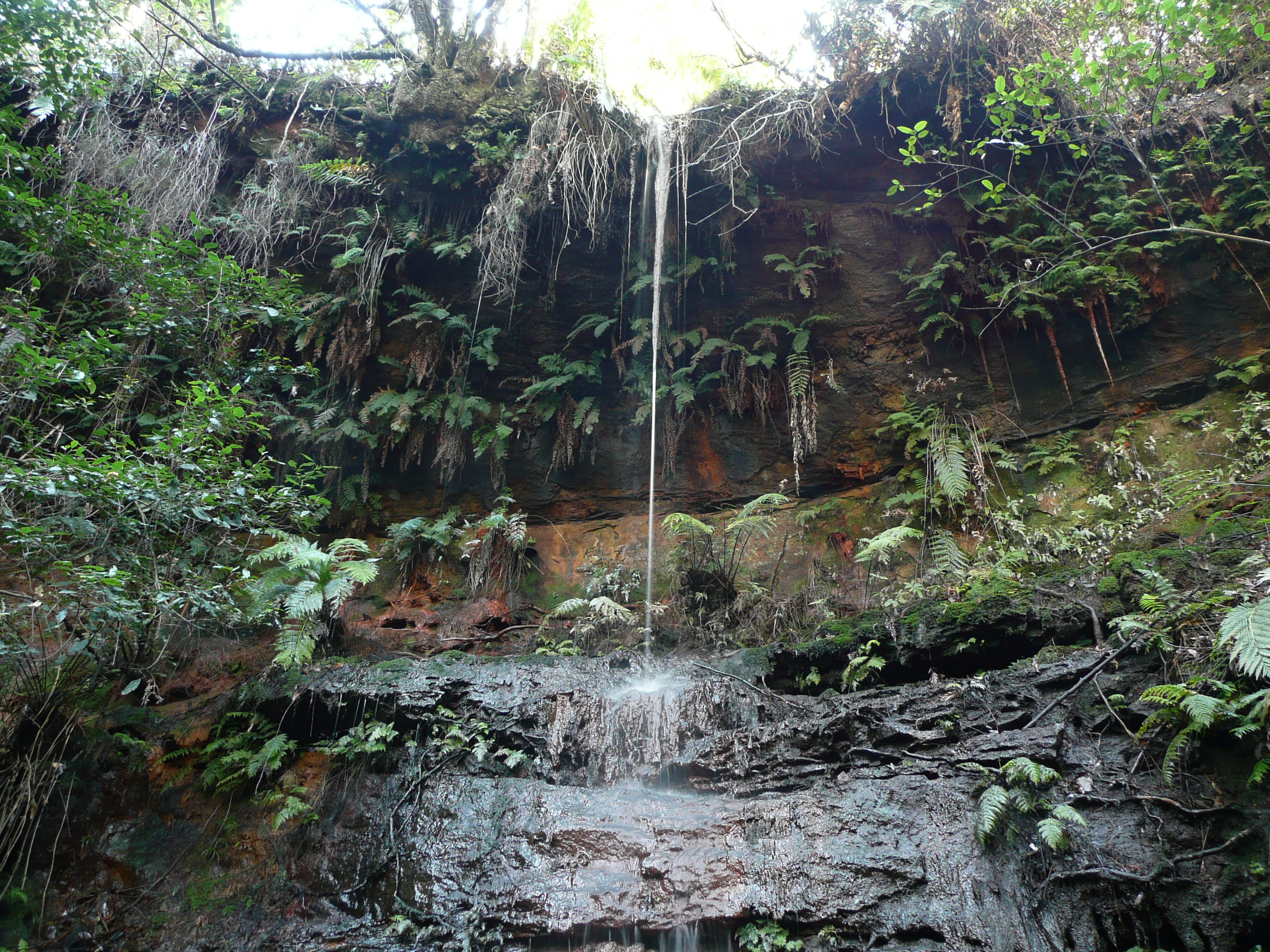
- Minnatonka Falls, Bullaburra
- Interactive map of Bullaburra
- Country: Australia
- State: New South Wales
- LGA: City of Blue Mountains
- Location: 95 km (59 mi) W of Sydney CBD; 10 km (6.2 mi) E of Katoomba

Government
  - State electorate: Blue Mountains
  - Federal division: Macquarie
- Elevation: 769 m (2,523 ft)

Population
  - Total: 1,300 (2021 census)
- Postcode: 2784
Suburbs around Bullaburra
Blue Mountains National Park	Blue Mountains National Park	Lawson
Wentworth Falls	Bullaburra	Lawson
	Blue Mountains National Park

Bullaburra is a small town in the state of New South Wales, Australia, in the City of Blue Mountains. It is one of the towns that stretch along the route of the Main Western railway line and Great Western Highway which pass over the Blue Mountains, west of Sydney. Bullaburra used to have a service station but it was demolished in 2008. Bullaburra is an Aboriginal word meaning clear day.

== Description ==
Bullaburra lies west of Lawson, and east of Wentworth Falls. The population together was 1,300 at the 2021 census. Bullaburra has a railway station served by NSW TrainLink's Blue Mountains Line, and a playground. Two reserves, Red Gum Park and Sir Henry Parkes Park, are nearby, Red Gum Park being on the south side of the town. Minnatonka Falls are a feature of the park. The Blue Mountains National Park, which is a World Heritage Site, is situated not far to the north and south of the town.

== Bushwalks ==
A walking track was constructed through the area in 1931. The Railway Department had agreed to supply electricity to the Blue Mountains Shire Council from the power station at Lithgow and a transmission line was put through from Blackheath to Lawson with a track to provide maintenance access. The authorities then decided to promote this track as a walking trail, which was duly opened on 21 November 1931. The surveyor who planned the track was A. Bruce, as a result of which the track eventually became known as Bruce's Walk. It passed through the north side of Bullaburra on the way to Lawson.

A pamphlet was published to publicise the walk, which passed through a variety of scenery, including glens and ridges. However, from World War II onwards, the track was forgotten and neglected. Parts of the track were also blocked off when the council constructed Greaves Creek dam in 1942 as a local water supply. Much later, however, a local walker named Dick Rushton found a copy of the pamphlet published in 1931 and set out to clear and mark the track. In 1980, he led a party of walkers along the section of track between Bullaburra and Wentworth Falls, and in 1983 he created a written guide to the track.

By 1986, Bruce's Walk had come to the attention of two other walkers, Jim Smith and Wilf Hilder, who organised a group of volunteers to clear the track between Bullaburra and Wentworth Falls. In the process, they found many artefacts and features, including signs, shelter caves, seats and picnic tables. This part of the track was officially opened on 24 May 1986, by Alderman David Lawton. The opening was attended by 118 people, including Dick Rushton, who was by then eighty years old. (This opening was condemned by the National Parks and Wildlife Service and the Mayor of the Blue Mountains City Council.)Other stretches of the track, from Wentworth Falls to Medlow Bath, were also cleared by the volunteers and opened later in 1986. The track, however, is still patchy and largely without signposts, and is not shown on the topographic map for the area.

On the south side of Bullaburra, Red Gum Park offers some scope for walks, with tracks starting from De Quency Road and Cottle Road. The main feature of the park is Minnatonka Falls, situated not far from the residential area in Boronia Road. Tracks go by the falls and part of the way down the creek that flows from the falls.

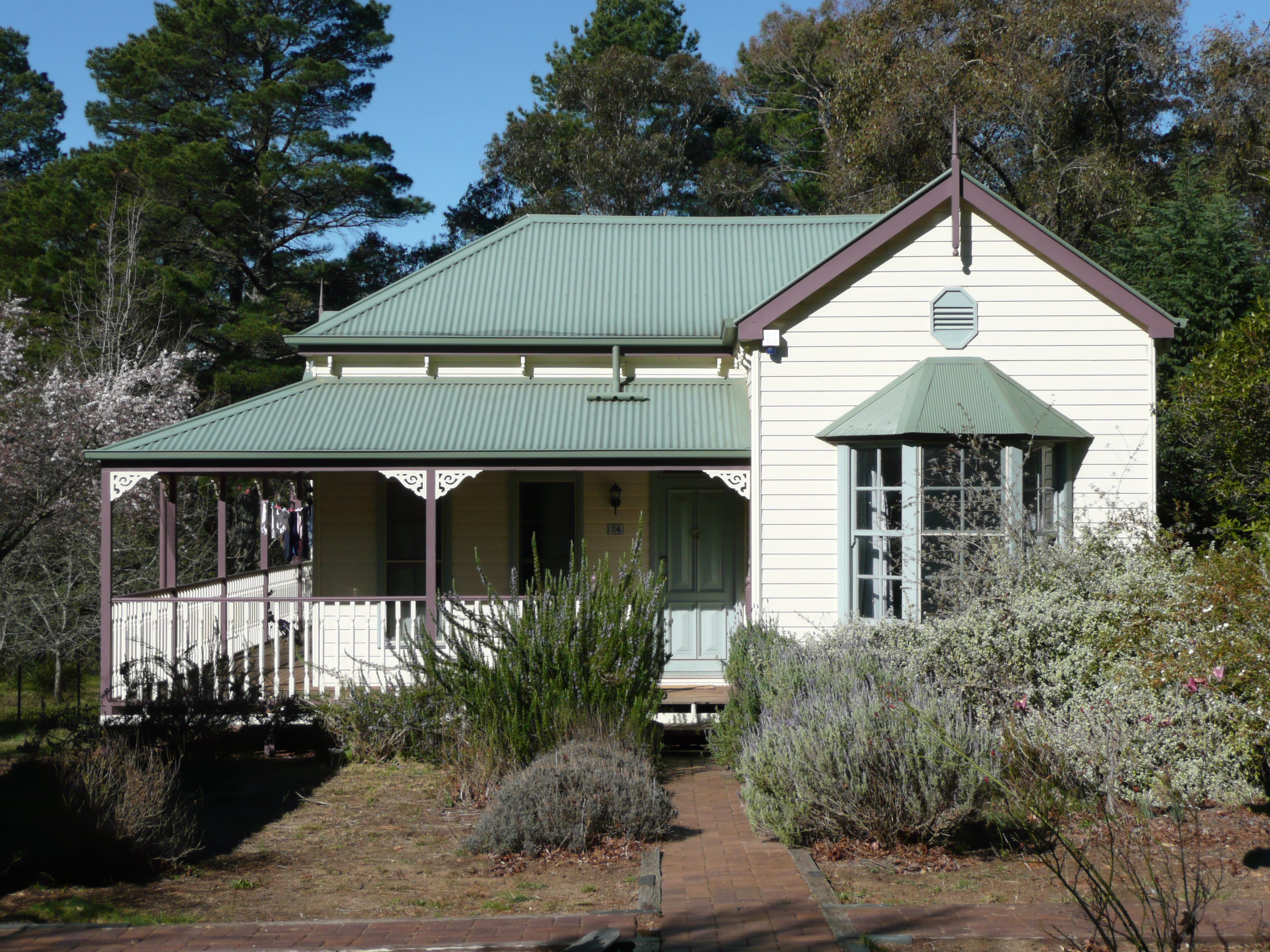
Cottage in Bullaburra

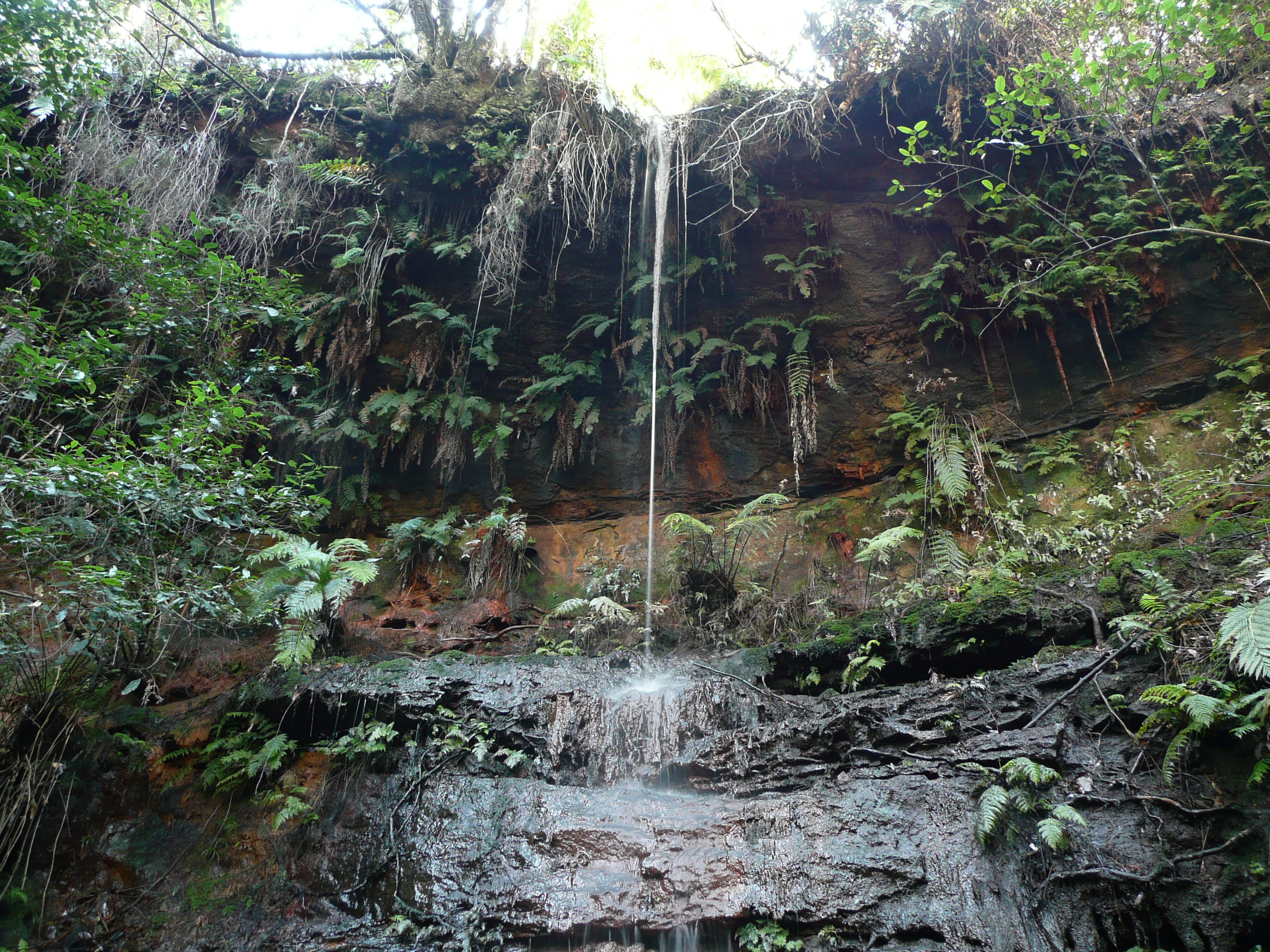
Minnatonka Falls after little rain

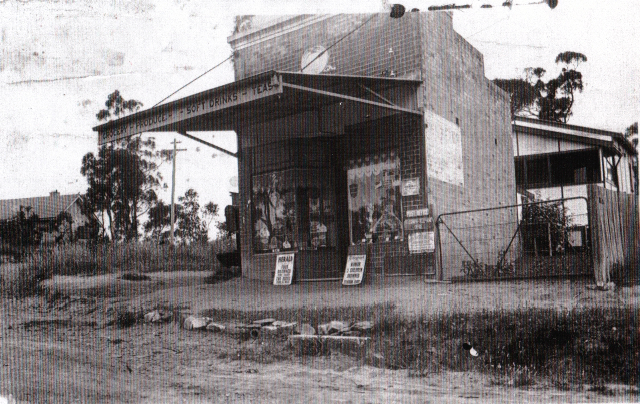
General store in Bullaburra, circa 1930s

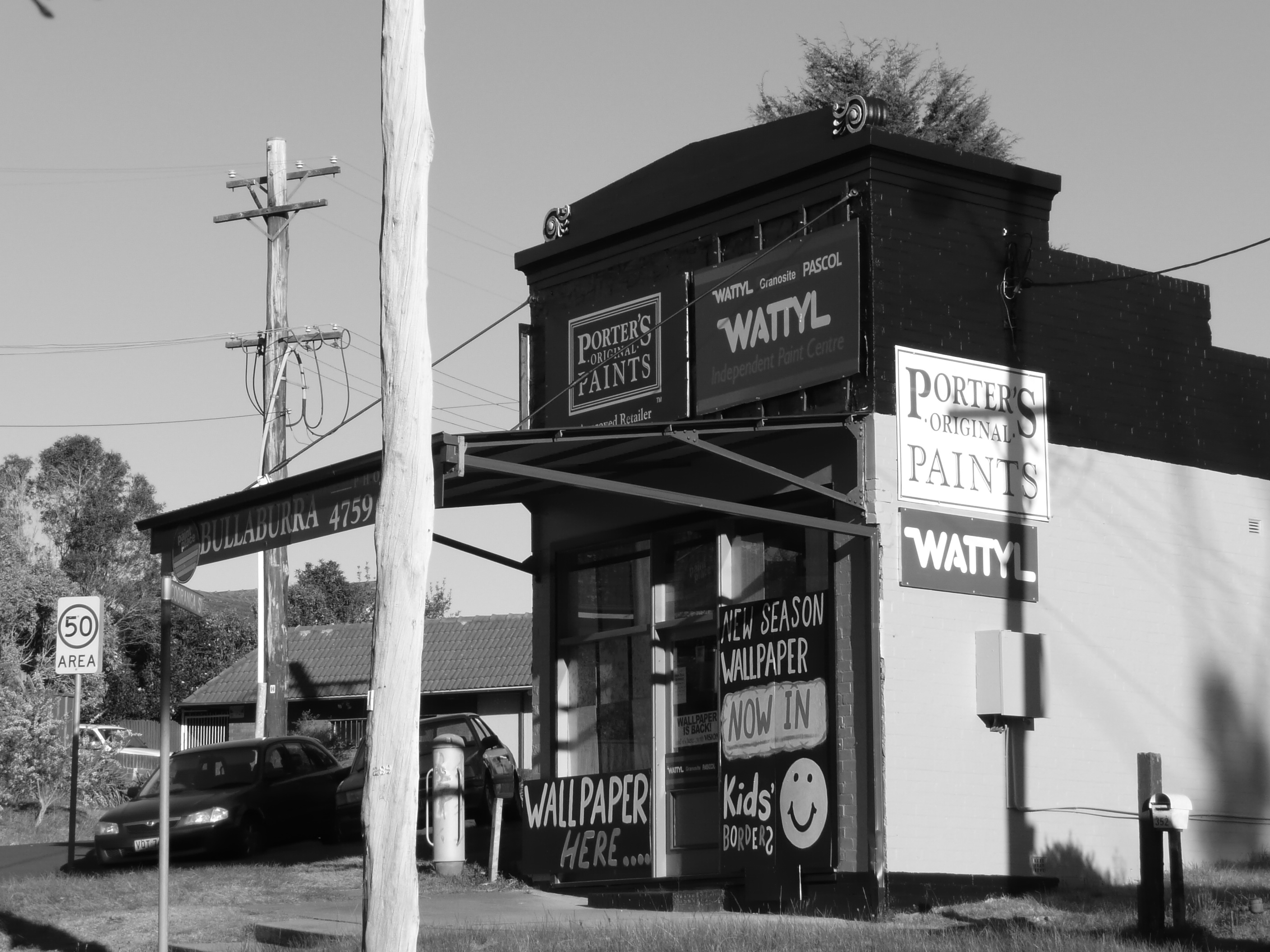
The same shop in 2008

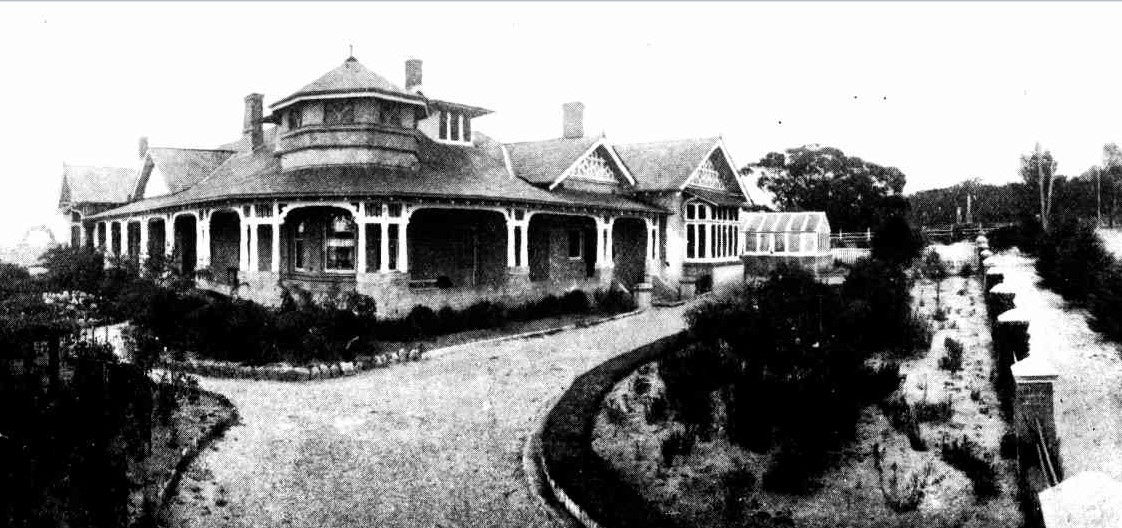
Cadia Park in Bullaburra, which was destroyed by bushfires in 1977

== Transport ==
Bullaburra railway station opened in 1925, much later than the stations in nearby towns, given that the Blue Mountains leg of the Great Western Railway reached Mt. Victoria station by 1869. The next stops in each direction are Lawson and Wentworth Falls stations which both opened in 1867.

Blue Mountains Transit operates one bus route through Bullaburra:

- 690K: Springwood to Katoomba via Faulconbridge, Hazelbrook, Wentworth Falls and Leura
