= Faulconbridge railway station =

Railway station in New South Wales, Australia

Faulconbridge
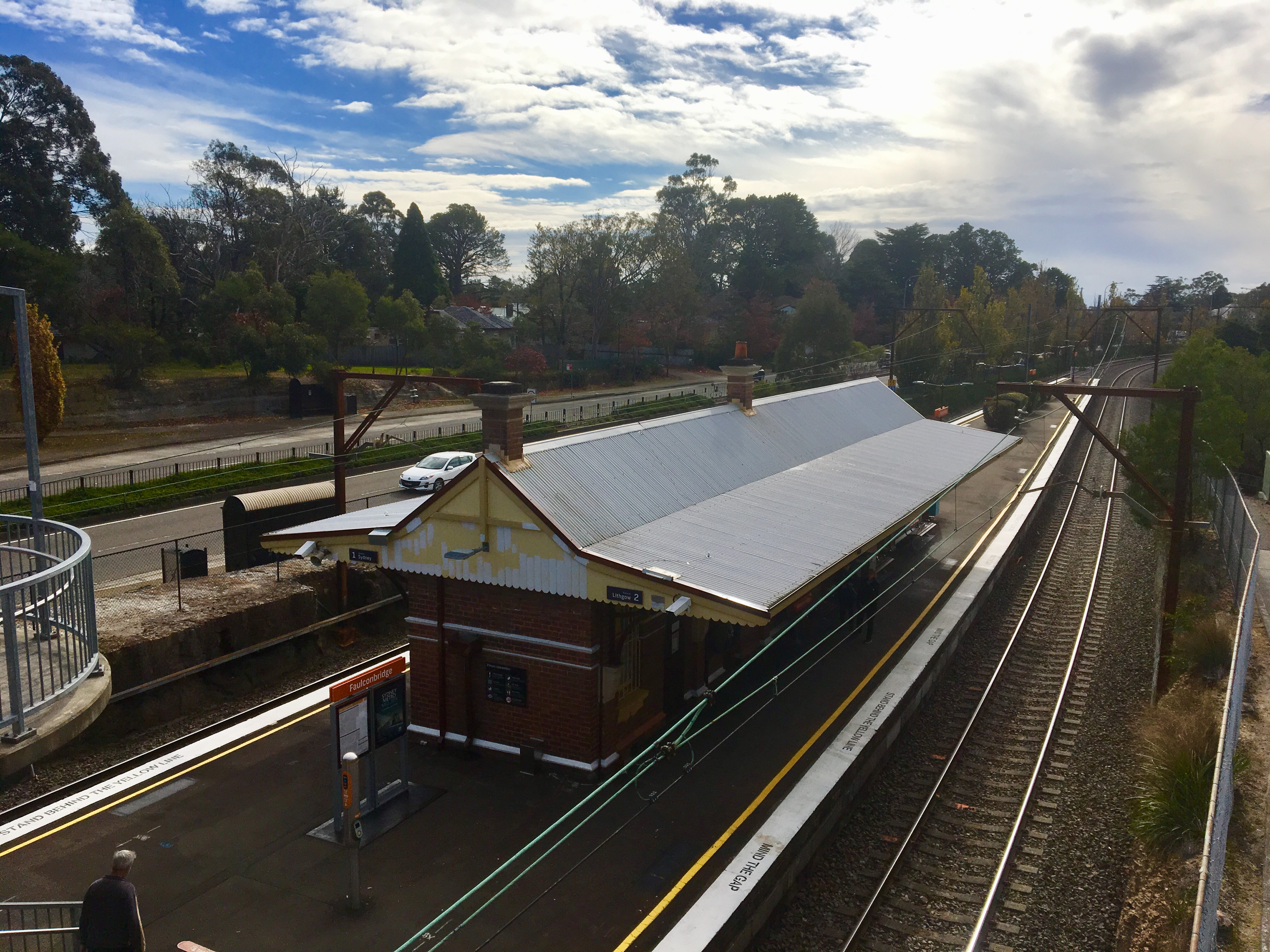
- Station platform and building, June 2019

General information
- Location: Great Western Highway, Faulconbridge; Australia
- Coordinates: 33°41′47″S 150°32′06″E
- Elevation: 442 metres (1,450 ft)
- Owner: Transport Asset Manager of New South Wales
- Operator: Sydney Trains
- Line: Main Western
- Distance: 82.96 km (51.55 mi) from Central
- Platforms: 2 (1 island)
- Tracks: 2
- Connections: Bus

Construction
- Structure type: Ground

Other information
- Status: Weekdays: Staffed: 6am to 10am: Weekends and public holidays: Unstaffed
- Station code: FLB
- Website: Transport for NSW

History
- Opened: 15 March 1877

Passengers
- 2025: 40,082 (year); 110 (daily) (Sydney Trains)

Services
Preceding station	Intercity Trains	Following station
Linden towards Lithgow	Blue Mountains Line	Springwood towards Central
Location
- Location within New South Wales

Faulconbridge railway station is a heritage-listed railway station located on the Main Western line in New South Wales, Australia. It serves the Blue Mountains suburb of Faulconbridge.

== History ==
Faulconbridge Station opened on 15 March 1877. This coincided with Sir Henry Parkes' 1876 purchase of land in the area, where he built the Faulconbridge House for which the town is named. The station may have been built at his request.

In 2021, the station received significant upgrades as part of the New South Wales government's Transport Access Program. This included two new lifts to access the platform and bus stop, new toilets, upgrades to pedestrian ramps, upgrades to car parking and dropoff spaces, and upgrades to platforms, stairs, and pathways adding tactiles and improved CCTV cameras, lighting and signage.

== Platforms and services ==
Faulconbridge has one island platform with two sides. It is serviced by Sydney Trains Blue Mountains Line services travelling from Sydney Central to Lithgow.

Platform	Line	Stopping pattern	Notes
1	Blue Mountains Line	services to Sydney Central	
2	Blue Mountains Line	services to Katoomba, Mount Victoria & Lithgow	

== Transport links ==
Blue Mountains Transit operates three bus routes via Faulconbridge station, under contract to Transport for NSW:

Code	Name	Notes
685H	Springwood to North Hazelbrook (Loop Service)	
690K	Springwood to Katoomba	
690P	Penrith to Springwood	
