= Matthew Everingham =

English convict (c. 1768 1817)

- Born: c. 1768; England
- Died: 25 December 1817 (aged 48–49); Hawkesbury River, Australia
- Resting place: Saint Matthew's Anglican Church Cemetery Windsor, Hawkesbury City, New South Wales, Australia
- Occupations: Lawyer's clerk, Farmer, Publican, District constable
- Known for: First man ashore from the First Fleet
- Convictions: Indicted, for being a profligrate person, found Guilty of fraud
- Penalty: Seven years' penal transportation

Matthew Everingham (c. 1768 – 25 December 1817), was an English convict sent to Australia aboard the Scarborough, a ship of the First Fleet. Convicted on 7 July 1784 at Old Bailey for the crime of fraud, he was sentenced to seven years' penal transportation to America. However, that country was no longer a receptacle for Britain's convicts since the successful American War of Independence, Everingham was instead incarcerated in the prison hulk Censor, a former French Navy frigate on the River Thames near Woolwich. Conditions aboard these prison ships were extremely poor, and mortality rates were high. Everingham managed to survive for three years until the First Fleet sailed from Portsmouth on 13 May 1787, Everingham was on board the Scarborough – one of 208 male convicts. He was 19 when the fleet landed in Sydney Cove.

== Early life ==
He is believed by some to have been the estranged son of Earl William Robert Everingham and Lady Alice.

However, according to the Australian Directory of Biography he was born on 25 July 1768, the son of Joseph Everingham and his wife Mary.

As a child he studied at Christ's Hospital a Royal charter Bluecoat school and was unusually well educated compared to most of his fellow convicts.

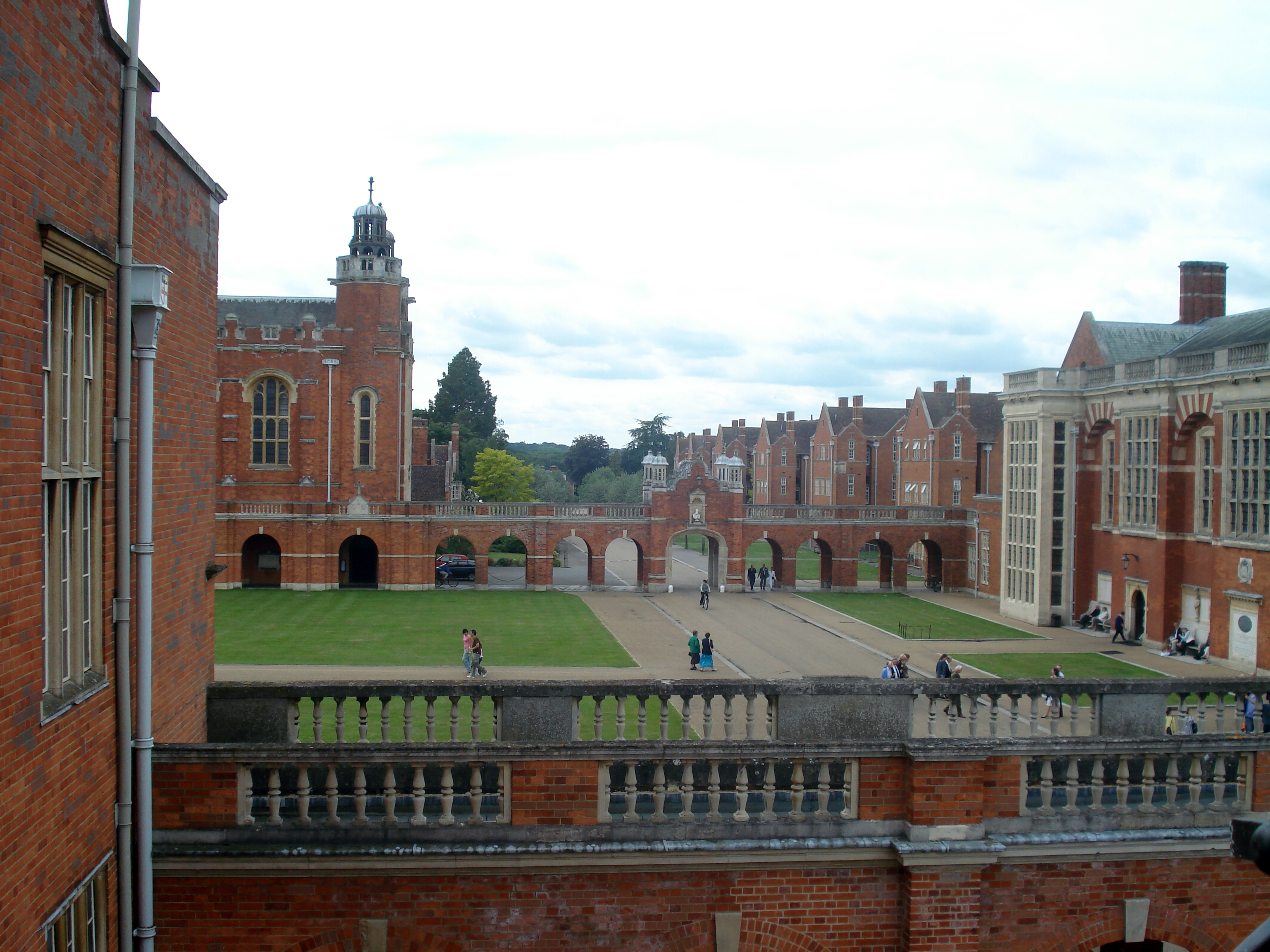
Photo Of Quadrangle and Front Avenue Point West

According to one of his descendants, former federal health minister, Doug Everingham, Matthew is said to have claimed to be a descendant of the Hereditary Keepers of Sherwood Forest including the famous Robin Hood.

Prior to his arrest, Everingham had been living at Elm Court in the Temple in London and working as a junior clerk to the law firm of a Mr Clermont.

== Trial ==
Trial at the Old Bailey, 7 July 1784

775. MATTHEW JAMES EVERINGHAM was indicted, for that he being a profligate person, on the 17th of June did falsly pretend to Owen Owens servant to Samuel Shepherd, Esq; in the Middle Temple, that he was sent to Mr. Shepherd, from Mr. Clermont's for Burn's Justice or Compton's Practice meaning certain books, by which he obtained the same books, value 10 s. the property of the said Samuel Shepherd, whereas he was not sent with that message. OWEN OWENS sworn. I am servant to Mr. Shepherd, I was servant to him on the 17th of June last, the prisoner came to me on the 17th of June in the morning, about ten or eleven, he came with Mr. Clermont's compliments to Mr. Shepherd, and he would be obliged to him, if he would lend him Burn's Justice or Compton's Practice, I gave him the books, and asked him whether he lived with Mr. Clermont's or not, he said yes, he did, and he had had the fever and ague, and was come back again. CLERMONT, Esq. sworn. The prisoner at the bar was my servant, but not on the 17th of June. Did you send him any where? - I did not send him any where. RICHARD BANNISTER sworn. I am a bookseller in Bellyard, Temple-bar, the prisoner came to me about the middle of June, I did not take any particular notice then of the time, he brought to me to sell Compton's Practice; I gave him five shillings for it, if it had been the last edition of the book it would have been worth more, but not being the last, it was the full value of it. What does the last edition sell for? - Sixteen shillings; I asked him whose they were, he asked me but three shillings, I said my lad I can give you five shillings for them, but you must produce me some authority, or I shall detain the books, he said he himself lived in Elm Court, Temple, upon which he went away, and returned and brought me a letter, on the authority of which I bought them; I thought it might be some distressed member of the law that wanted money, I could not tell. PRISONER's DEFENCE. I was in great distress. Court to Owen Owens . Were Mr. Shepherd and Mr. Clermont acquainted? - Yes, they were. GUILTY . Transported for seven years . Tried by the London Jury before Mr. ROSE.

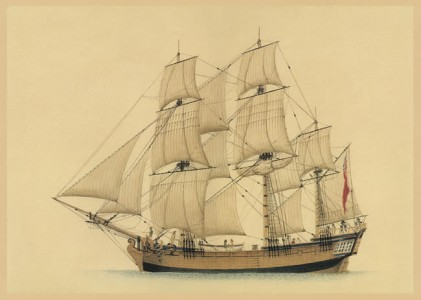
Illustration of Scarborough

== Transportation and life in Australia ==
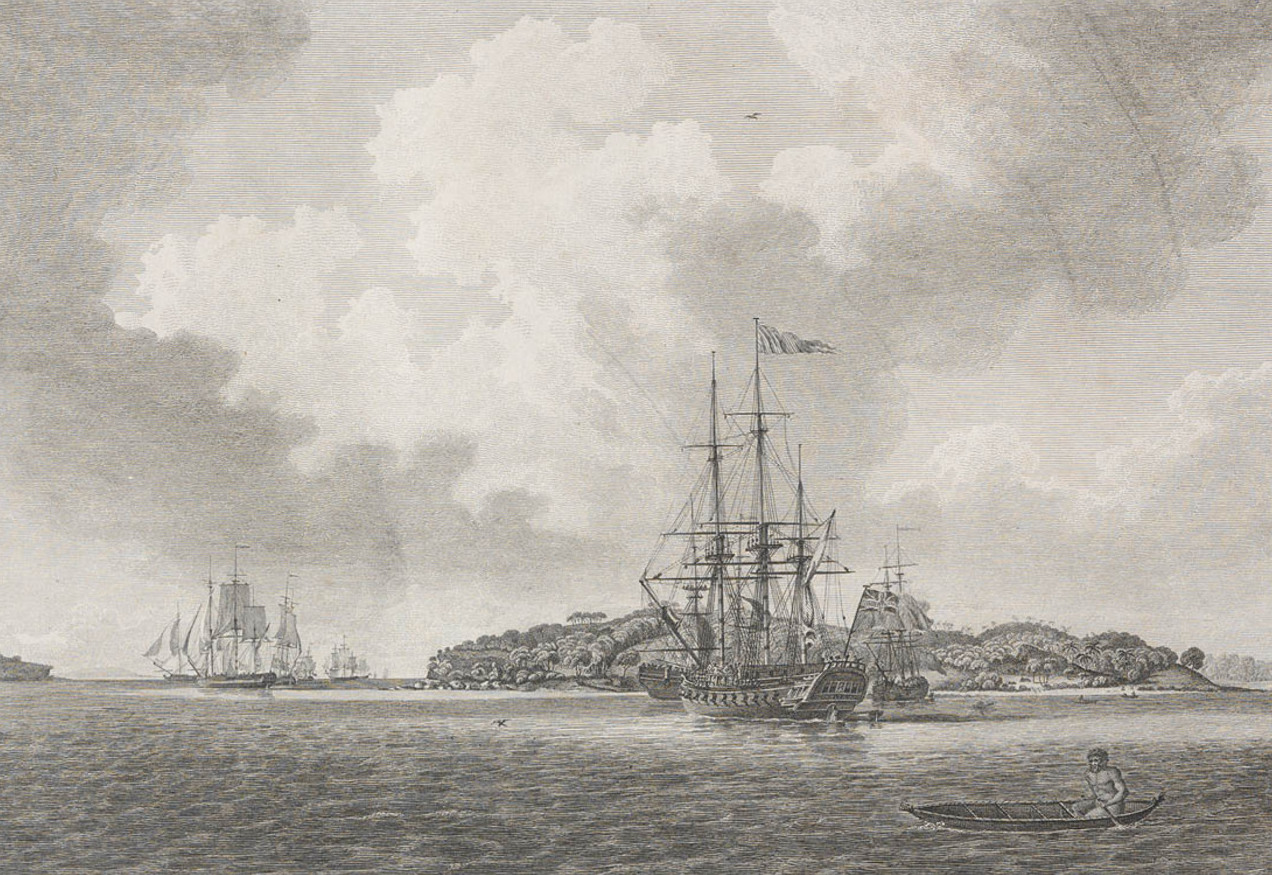
The First Fleet at voyage's end in 1788. Engraving from The Voyage of Governor Phillip to Botany Bay

The fleet reached Botany Bay on 18 January 1788, and relocated to Sydney Cove eight days later. Everingham had been assigned to the staff of Governor Phillip due to his excellent writing ability and was detailed to carry the Governor ashore from the first boat to land from the fleet making him the first person ashore albeit with the Governor on his back. On disembarkation around 200 of the male convicts from the Fleet were set to work clearing the foreshore and constructing huts subsisting on a limited ration of salted meat, rancid butter and shellfish. Conditions were harsh and many of the convicts fell seriously ill and died within the first six months of arrival. Everingham survived any way he could. On 7 February 1789 at Port Jackson, Everingham received 25 lashes for drunkenness and falsehood. On 15 August 1789, by then working with Charles Parker, the carpenter of the Sirius, he was an important witness in the case of Sarah Bellamy, who had had to resist the advances and forced entry to her hut by James Kelty, master of the Sirius and Captain James Meredith, who were charged with creating a disturbance in the camp late at night.

Everingham married Second Fleeter Elizabeth Rhymes on 13 March 1791, by Rev. Richard Johnson, at Rosehill (Parramatta), New South Wales. Everingham signed the register, and Elizabeth, who was illiterate, marked with a cross. Witnesses were Thomas Barnsley and Peter Stewart. Everingham describes Elizabeth as "...a most excellent woman...hard indeed to be found in this Colony for the generality of them disgrace the very name of woman!"

Their children were Mary Everingham, Sarah Elizabeth (Everingham) Woodbury, Matthew James Everingham, William Everingham, George Everingham, Ann Elizabeth (Everingham) Chaseling, Elizabeth (Everingham) Bowd, James Everingham, Maria Maud Everingham and John Everingham.

At the time of his marriage in March 1791, he wrote to his friend Samuel Shepherd that "I was at this time overseer of all the Pit Sawyers and measured the work", also supervising women employed at needlework. He was based at Rose Hill and acted as an assistant to Henry Dodd, the farm superintendent there.

On 18 July 1791, four months after his marriage, the couple were settled on 50 acres at The Ponds, (the grant was officially dated later on 22 February 1792). They were visited on 6 December 1791 by Watkin Tench who revealed his contempt for the legal profession when he wrote that "the attorney's clerk ... I thought out of his province; I dare believe that he finds cultivating his own land, not half so easy a task, as he formerly found that of stringing together volumes of tautology to encumber, or convey away that of his neighbour". Everingham had been initially confident, writing that he had "youth on my side and pretty well inured to hard work and having an agreeable partner", but wrote that sickness, the death of his daughter and crop failures were "bad encouragement for a Young biginner".

By October 1792, his farm had begun to prosper with 5 acres sown in "India corn" and one in English wheat, half an acre barley, a garden growing pumpkins, melons, callavans, a beehive, two pregnant sows and some poultry. He wrote that "in three months I am to maintain myself and family independent of the public store".

By 1795 he had purchased the position of government baker at Parramatta.

== Attempt to cross the Blue Mountains ==
In October 1795, he set off in an attempt to cross the Blue Mountains. Everingham's party consisted of "Read or Reid" thought to be William Read (Scarborough) and "Ramsay" thought to be John Ramsay (Scarborough), and both neighbours of the Everinghams. They set out from Parramatta on 30 October 1795, carrying provisions in "knapsacks" for the journey. They reached Richmond Hill, on the Hawkesbury River, crossing at this point, and setting off on foot next morning for the mountains.

In a letter to Samuel Shepherd, Everingham describes his journey of 13 days, reaching (from the descriptions) Mt Bowen, then on to Kurrajong Heights, and Mt Irvine, where they turned back due to a lack of supplies. An alternate interpretation of Everingham's journey has the party reaching Mount Tomah instead of Mt Irvine. Everingham spent the last 3 days of journey home without shoes as they had worn out. They returned home on the night of 11 November 1795, with the intention of making another attempt "when we shall have a chance to get back".

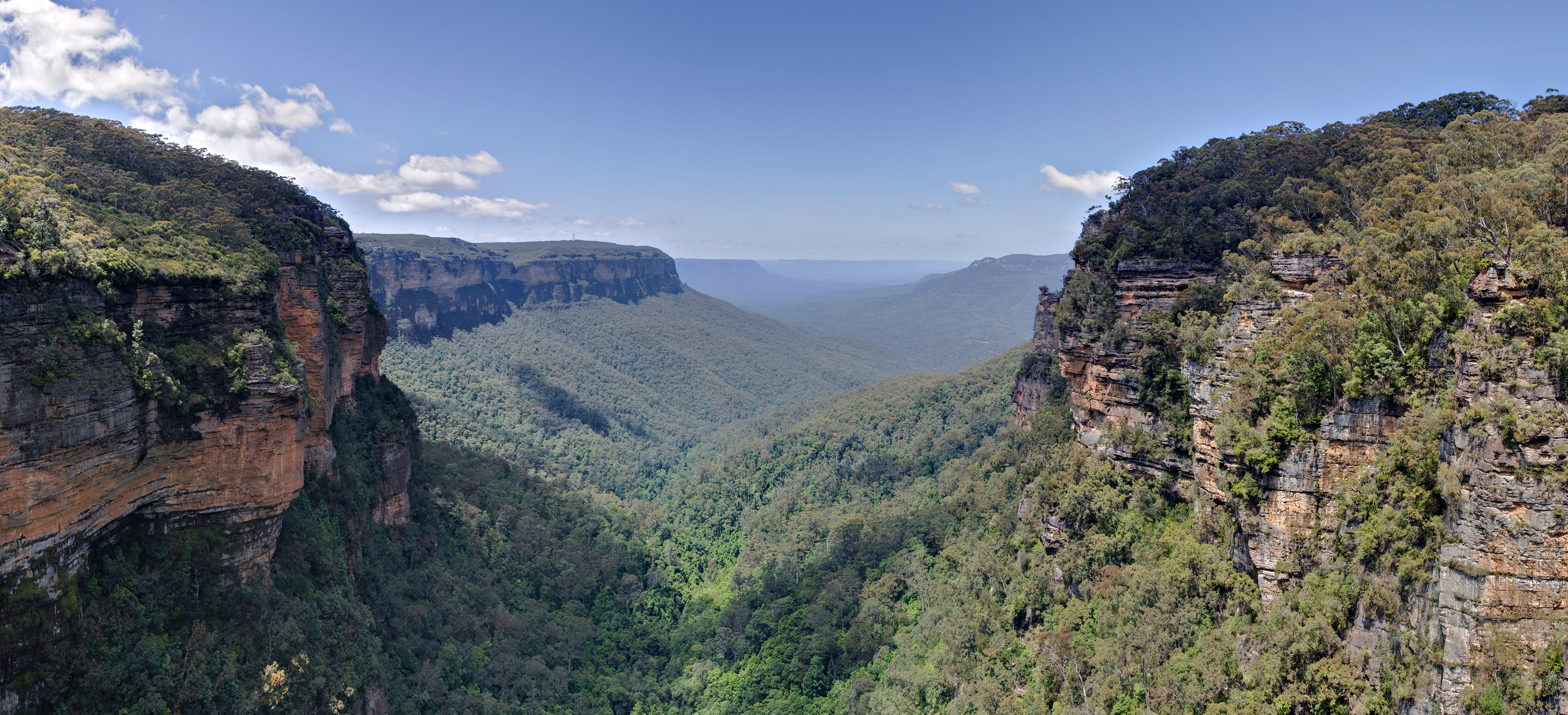
Jamison Valley, Blue Mountains, Australia - Nov 2008

The letter to Shepherd dated 30 of August 1796, describing this journey, was ended with a request for a few books "for my instruction and amusement when I have an Hour of relaxation from business. Here it is impossible to get them".

== Between 1803 and 1806 ==
Sackville Reach, Hawkesbury, New South Wales, Australia Source: Hardy, Bobbie. Early Hawkesbury settlers. Kenthurst: Kangaroo Press, 1985

Everingham was granted 50 acres at Sackville Reach. It was not ideal, being part rocky and part flood-prone, and vulnerable in its isolation to Aboriginal plunderers. In May 1804, the family was attacked by an aboriginal raiding party. Everingham, his wife and their Irish assigned convict worker were said to have suffered spear wounds and their house and barn were robbed and burned before Elizabeth was able to drive off the attackers with well-aimed musket fire. Caves on the farm bore the hand marks and other artwork of the aboriginal people who had lived there for millennia. Recovering from their injuries, the couple worked had to clear and cultivate the land and by 1806 they had at least 19 acres cleared (11 in wheat, 6 in maize, 1 in barley, 1 in potatoes, orchard and garden). They held 13 bushels of maize in store and owned 18 pigs, supporting themselves, 6 children, a convict and a free man. In the 1980s the site of the farm was occupied by the Sackville Ski Gardens on the Tizzana road near the Sackville ferry.

"We are concerned to state that a few of the Natives have again manifested an inclination to hostility, and already proceeded to acts of abominable outrage. Report at the present juncture confines their ravages and barbarity to Portland Head, where Mr. Matthew Everingham, settler, his wife, and a servant, are said to have been speared; as is also Mr. John Howe, settler, near the above spot. The house and the out-houses of the former were plundered and afterwards set on fire, but the spear wounds received are not accompanied with any mortal appearance. Several other settlers in this neighbourhood have suffered very considerably in being robbed of their cloathing [sic], stock and grain.

== Between 1806 and 1812 ==
Everingham's property suffered floods in 1806 and 1809, in which he was brought close to ruin. He left the Sackville farm and moved his family to Green Hills (Windsor) where he was employed by the wealthy emancipist brewer and settler, Andrew Thompson. In February 1810 he was granted a wine and spirit licence. After Thompson's death in October 1810 the family lived at his West Hill (or Red House) Farm (at modern McGraths Hill). He was in financial difficulty in 1812 when his property was offered for sale by execution. He failed to sell that millstone, the Sackville farm, which was again ravaged by flood in 1811. The property was leased to his son Matthew and finally sold in 1820. In 1810 he submitted a petition for a new land grant "...The humble petition of Matthew Everingham settler Most humbly sheweth That Your Excellency's petitioner has been in this colony ever since its first establishment under His Excellency Governor Phillip whose servant he was till his time expired 1791 when his Excellency settled him at the district called the Ponds which proving to be a very [illegible] spot his Excellency Governor King sumoned [sic] him to the district of Portland Head at the Hawkesbury and the grant there was so situated being bounded back by tremendous rocks that he could have no more than about 16 acres left for tillage altho' his grant was for 50 acres, this Your Excellency's petitioner found as his family increased [illegible] adequate to their support having a wife and seven small children to maintain altho 'he led the whole that was fit for cultivation of land under tillage. Your Excellency's petitioner did in consequence large and ever growing family and the very heavy loss he sustained in the last flood, memorial His Honor Rt. Paterson for more land --- here in the vicinity of the Hawkesbury and his Honor was good enough to order 130 acres of land to be measured for him at the Curryjong Brush. Lately settled with ground is measured and return sent down to Sydney some time since but your Excellency's petitioner has not yet received the grant. But Your Excellency's petitioner humbly hopes Your Excellency will be pleased to on account of his large family to confirm his grant to him and Your Excellency's petitioner would condescend to the [illegible] ... Hawkesbury January 26, 1810."

== Death ==
December 25, 1817 (aged 49 years) Portland Head, Hawkesbury, New South Wales, Australia Cause of death: Drowned Source: Great Britain. Colonial Office. Return of births, marriages and deaths in N.S.W. 1816-1822 Citation details: Return of deaths within the districts of Hawkesbury for the quarter ending 31 December 1817.

Everingham and his wife Elizabeth by 1817 were back at Portland Head, Sackville Reach, on a 15-acre rented farm near the site of their original grant. Everingham was appointed district constable there and with his allowances as the district constable they were getting by. After a festive family Christmas day, duty called Everingham to a sloop on the river, a sly grog runner. Family accounts claim Everingham had defeated and captured the rum smugglers but already somewhat inebriated from Christmas lunch he had then continued drinking the seized cargo of rum and later fell overboard and drowned. Everingham was buried at Saint Matthew's Anglican Church Cemetery, Windsor, Hawkesbury City, New South Wales, Australia His epitaph reads: "Farewell vain world i have had anough of thee and am carless what thou canst say of me thy smiles i curt not nor thy frowns i fear beneath this turf my head lies quit here."

== Bibliography ==
- Matthew Everingham, a first fleeter and his times. Library of Australian History. 1980. OCLC 8283689.
- Britton, Alex R., ed. (1978). Historical records of New South Wales. Vol. 1, part 2. Phillip, 1783–1792. Lansdown Slattery & Co. OCLC 219911274.
- Chapman, Don (1981). 1788: The People of the First Fleet. Cassell Australia. ISBN 0726914177.
- Gillen, Mollie (1989). The Founders of Australia: A Biographical Dictionary of the First Fleet. Library of Australian History. ISBN 0908120699.
- Hill, David (2009). 1788. Random House Australia. ISBN 9781741668001.
