= Faulconbridge, New South Wales =

Faulconbridge
- Town
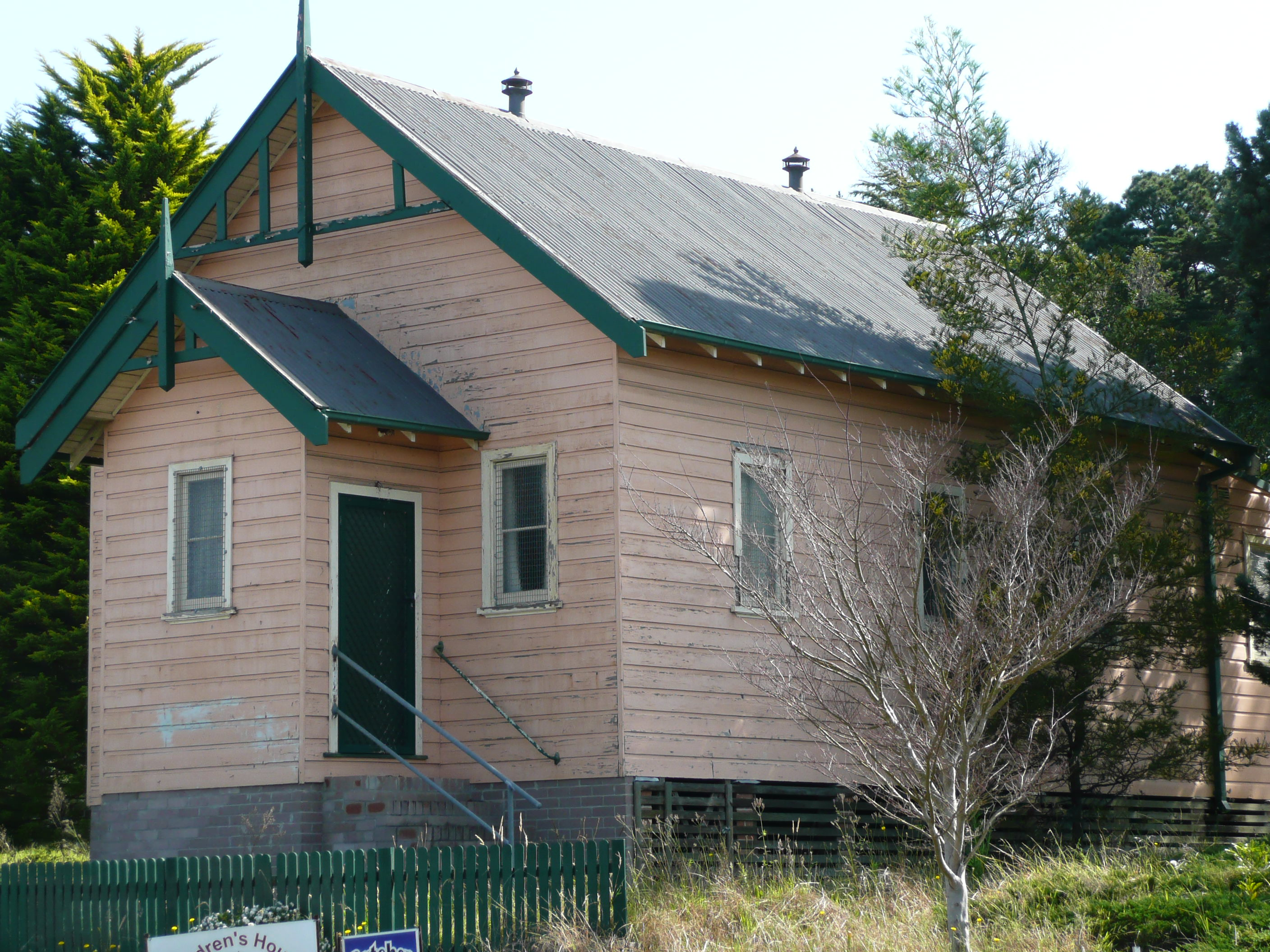
- Former chapel in Carpenter Gothic style, Great Western Highway

- Interactive map of Faulconbridge
- Coordinates: 33°41′40″S 150°32′12″E
- Country: Australia
- State: New South Wales
- City: Blue Mountains
- LGA: City of Blue Mountains
- Location: 77 km (48 mi) W of Sydney CBD; 27 km (17 mi) E of Katoomba

Government
  - State electorate: Blue Mountains
  - Federal division: Macquarie
- Elevation: 450 m (1,480 ft)

Population
  - Total: 4,025 (2016 census)
- Postcode: 2776
Localities around Faulconbridge
Blue Mountains National Park	Grose Valley	Winmalee
Blue Mountains National Park	Faulconbridge	Springwood
Linden	Blue Mountains National Park

Faulconbridge is a village located in the Blue Mountains. It is about 77 km (48 mi) west of the Sydney central business district, New South Wales and is 450 metres above sea level. At the 2016 census, Faulconbridge had a population of 4,025 people. At the 2021 cenus, the population had risen to 4,156.

== History and description ==
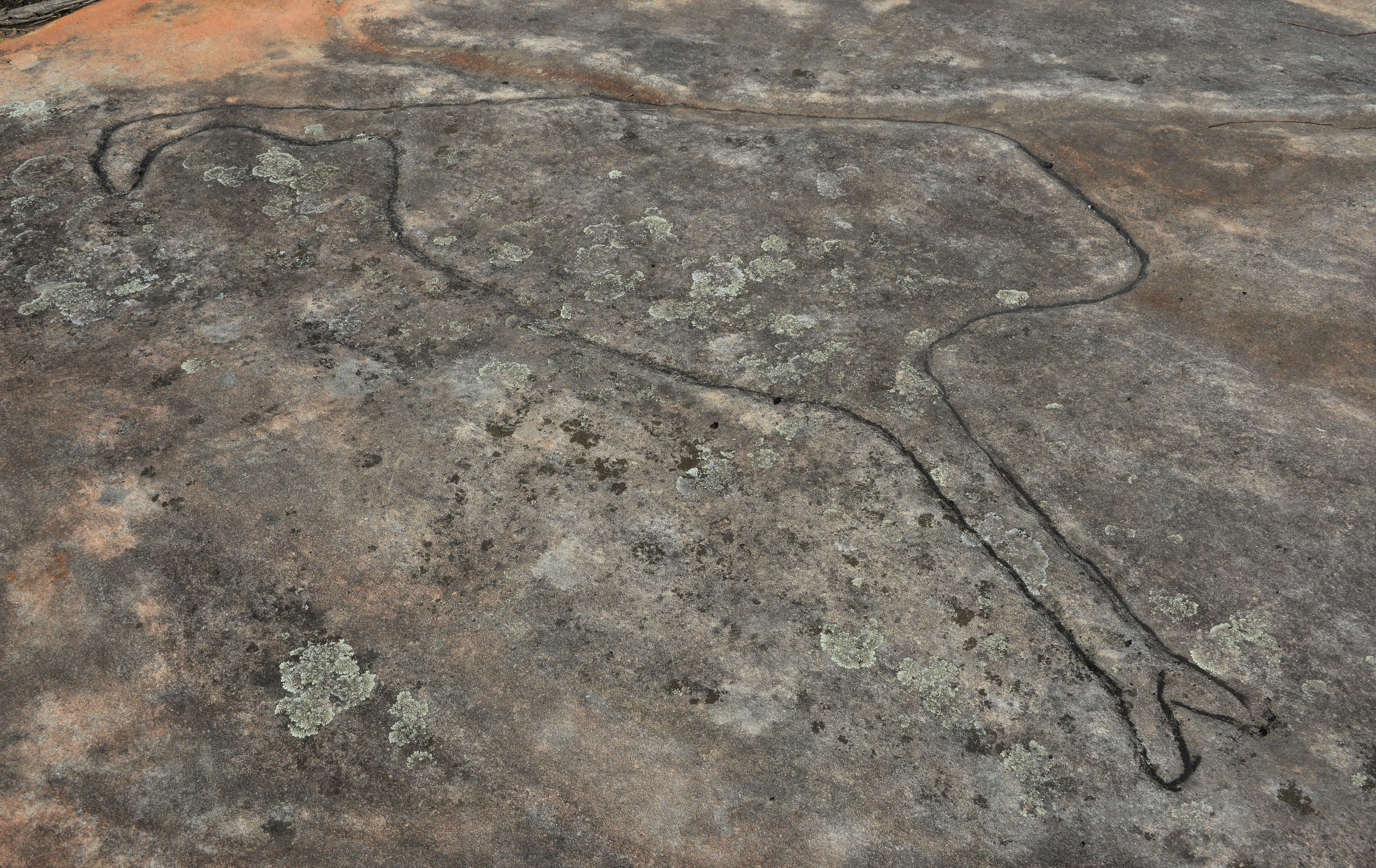
Aboriginal carving of an emu, Ticehurst Park

The Faulconbridge area was occupied by Indigenous Australians long before European exploration. They left behind numerous signs of their presence, one of the most outstanding being the group of rock carvings in Ticehurst Park. This site includes a wide variety of carvings, including two emus, some grinding grooves and several waterholes created or modified to collect rainwater.

European exploration of the area began with Blaxland, Wentworth and Lawson in May 1813, while they were camped at Springwood and looking for a route which would take them over the mountains. It was settled in the 1870s after the railway line had opened the mountains up.

One of the earliest residents was the "Father of Federation", Sir Henry Parkes, who moved to the area in 1877 and purchased 600 acres (2.4 km^{2}). It is said that the original railway platform at Faulconbridge was specifically built to serve his residence, which was known as Faulconbridge House. The town was named after Parkes' home. Faulconbridge was the maiden name of Parkes' mother, while a small waterfall in the area — Clarinda Falls — was named after his first wife, Clarinda Varney (the Varney name was passed on to Parkes' son, Varney Parkes). Parkes is buried in Faulconbridge Cemetery, alongside the grave of his first wife, Varney Parkes and other family members. The railing surrounding his grave bears a plaque which describes his role in Australian history:

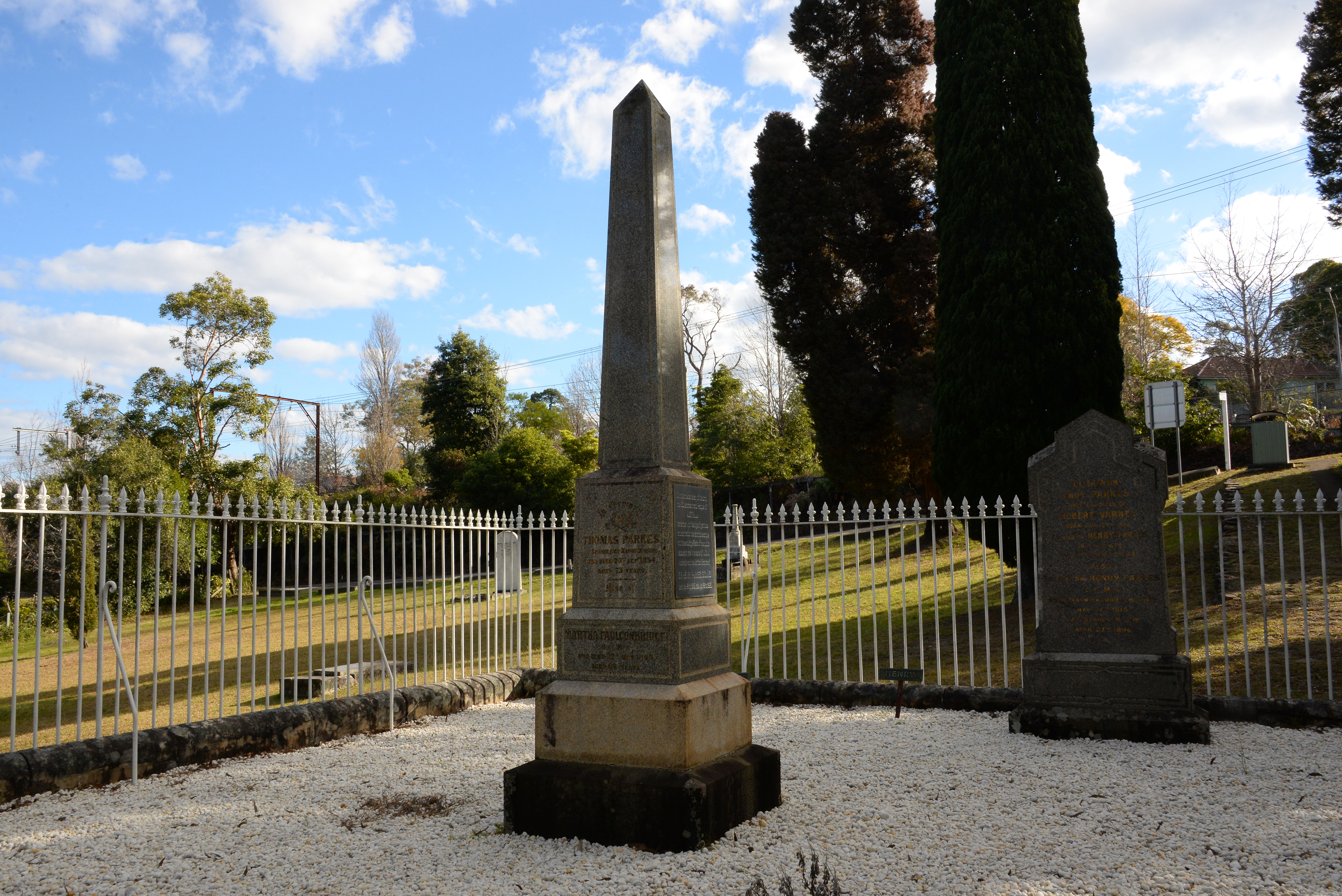
Graves of Henry Parkes and his first wife, Clarinda, Faulconbridge Cemetery

"Sir Henry Parkes, Father of Australian Federation, five times Prime Minister of New South Wales, arrived in Australia 25 July 1839, he worked as station-hand, Customs Officer and bone and ivory turner. In 1850 became proprietor of Empire Newspaper. Member of New South Wales Parliament from 1854-1894, Sir Henry Parkes is especially remembered for his efforts to develop New South Wales Education and Railways and his work for Federation earned him his title Father of Federation."

On Sir Henry's Parade (which runs between Springwood and Faulconbridge on the southern side of both the railway line and the highway) is Jackson Park, which is home to the Prime Ministers' Corridor of Oaks. Joseph Jackson, a NSW Member of Parliament, gave the park to the local council in 1933 with the explicit intention of having every Prime Minister of Australia, or a nearest surviving relative, plant an oak tree. Jackson was a huge admirer of Henry Parkes and believed that his Corridor of Oaks was a suitable monument to the man most responsible for the federation of Australian states. Every Prime Minister since Gough Whitlam has had their tree destroyed soon after planting, and the trees representing these Prime Ministers were re-planted later. In 1975 Malcolm Fraser faced a hostile crowd when he came to plant his oak. Jackson Park is named after Jackson.

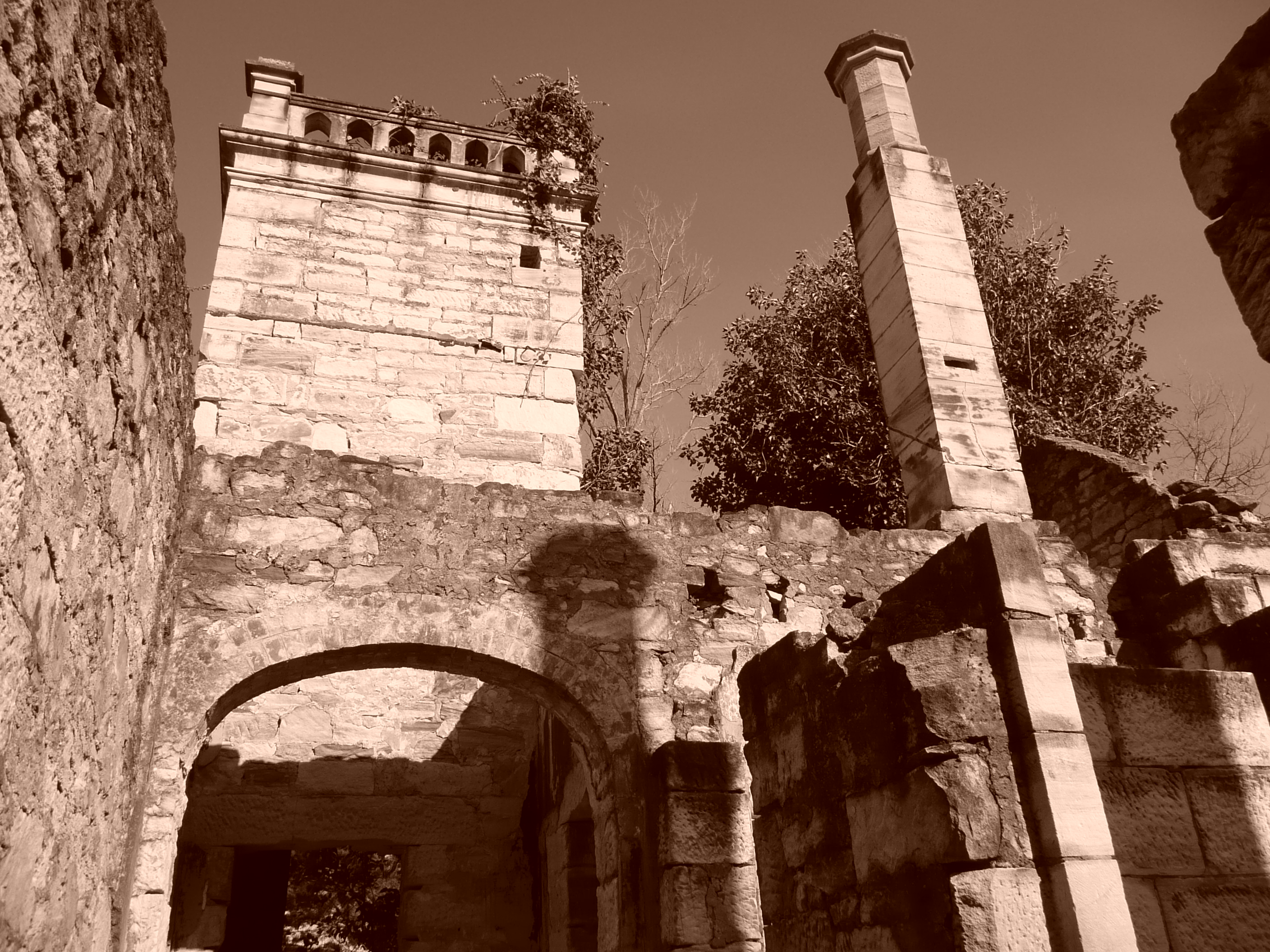
Ruins of Eurama

Faulconbridge is well known for having been the home of artist Norman Lindsay. The Norman Lindsay Gallery and Museum, owned by the National Trust of Australia, is at the end of Chapman Parade. Some Faulconbridge streets have been given names of characters out of Lindsay's famous 1918 children's book The Magic Pudding. These include Bill Barnacle Avenue, Watkin Wombat Way and more. Lindsay gave his name to the Division of Lindsay, but Faulconbridge is actually in the Division of Macquarie.

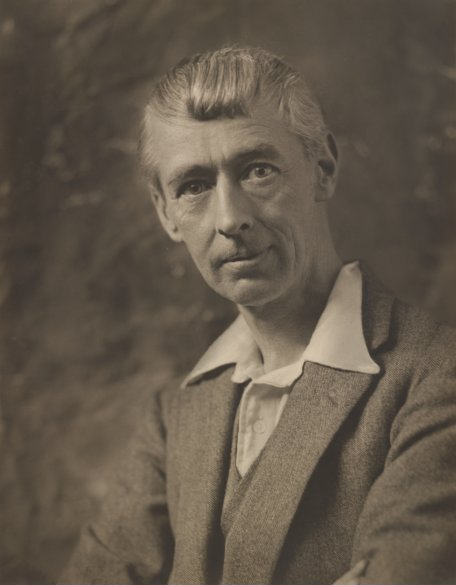
Artist and author Norman Lindsay lived and worked in Faulconbridge

Fire Chief Phil Koperberg lived in Watkin Wombat Way. He later became a politician representing the seat of the Blue Mountains.

A number of Aboriginal carvings are also to be found on the rock shelves in the area.

One of the most prominent landmarks in the area is the ruined house called Eurama, two kilometres west of Faulconbridge station. This substantial stone house with Tudor chimneys was built in 1881 by the stonemason Paddy Ryan, for Andrew McCulloch. The property was substantial enough, or the owner had enough influence, to even warrant its own platform on the nearby railway line, Numantia. At first it was called Weemala, but the name was changed to Eurama by later owners. It was unused for some time until being restored by a new owner, but was then destroyed by bushfires in 1968. The region was again under threat during the 2013 New South Wales bushfires.

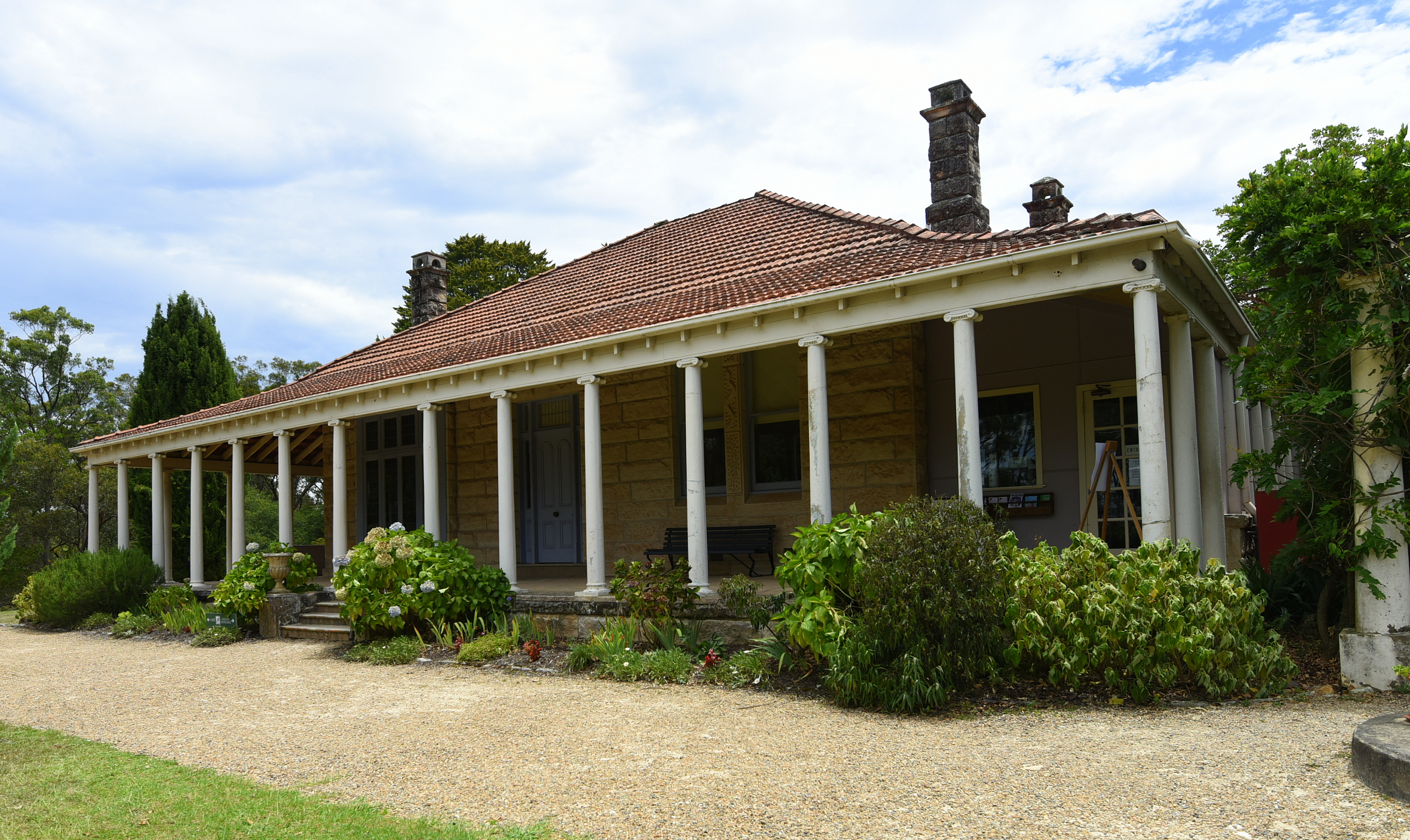
The Norman Lindsay Gallery and Museum, the artist's former home and studio

== Heritage listings ==
Faulconbridge has a number of heritage-listed sites, including:

- Blue Mountains National Park: Blue Mountains walking tracks
- 14-20 Norman Lindsay Crescent: Norman Lindsay Gallery and Museum

== Population ==
In the 2021 Census, there were 4,156 people in Faulconbridge, a 3.25% increase from 2016. 82.4% of people were born in Australia. The next most common country of birth was England at 5.3%. 92.1% of people spoke only English at home. The most common responses for religion were No Religion 45.7%, Catholic 17.9% and Anglican 14.4%.

== Commercial areas ==
There are two commercial areas in Faulconbridge. One known as Coomassie shops contains a petrol station, Chinese restaurant, tax accountant, hairdresser, vet, takeaway, pharmacy, pizza restaurant and liquor store while the second has Chapters & Leaves Tea Room, petrol station, hairdresser, physiotherapist, Beautician, home builder and a large preschool. The second is close to the railway station and a carpenter gothic style former chapel.

== Flora ==
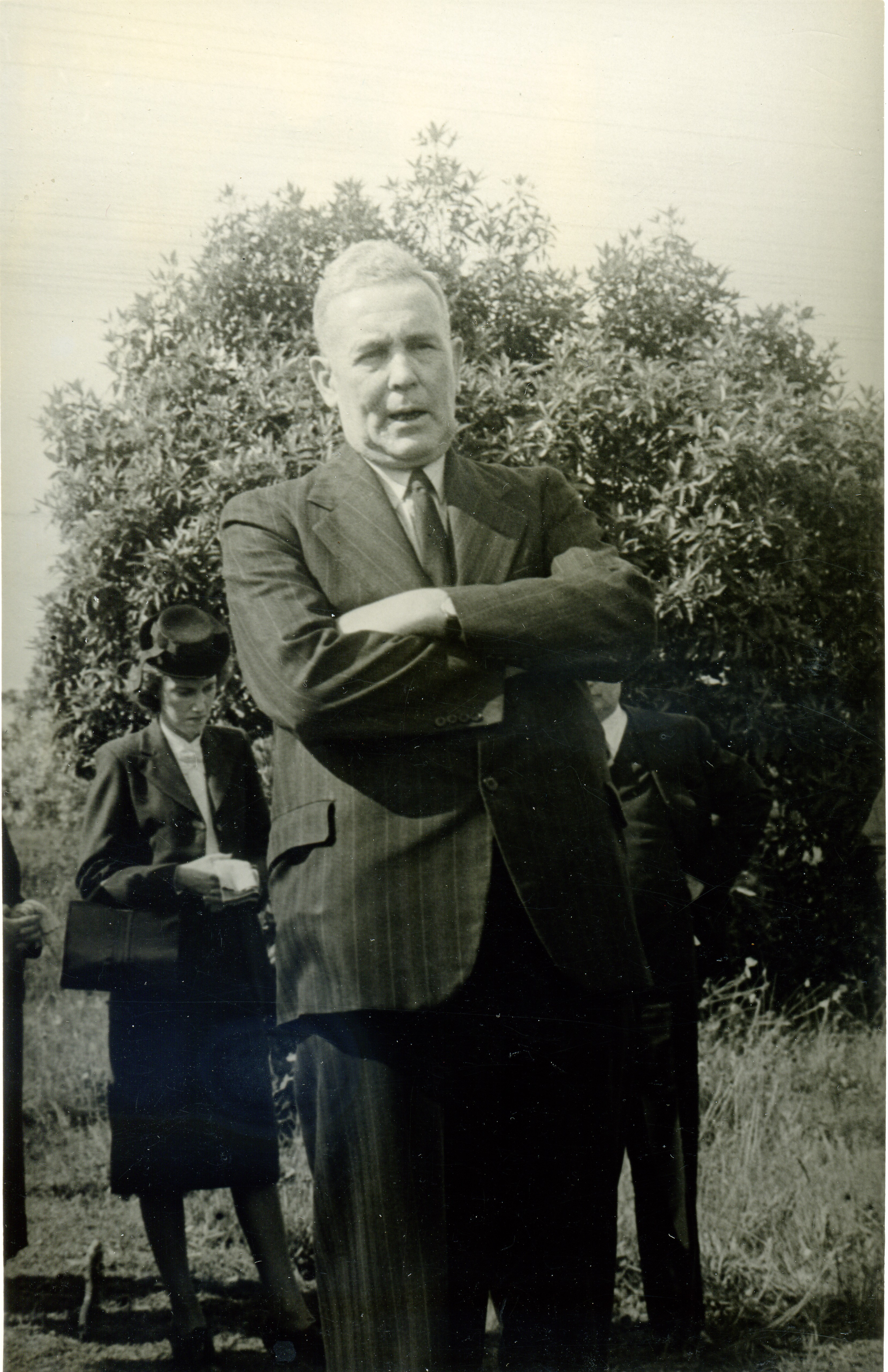
Ben Chifley shortly after planting a tree at the Prime Ministers' Corridor of Oakes, Faulconbridge, 1947

Faulconbridge is home to the rare Faulconbridge Mallee Ash.

The Prime Ministers' Corridor of Oaks sits just to the north of the Great Western Highway in Faulconbridge, near the home of Henry Parkes, with an oak planted for each Australian Prime Minister. Its first tree was planted by—and for—Prime Minister Joseph Lyons and the most recent tree being planted by Julia Gillard.
