= Blue Mountains (New South Wales) =

Mountain range in Australia

Blue Mountains Colomatta or Gulumada
- Region
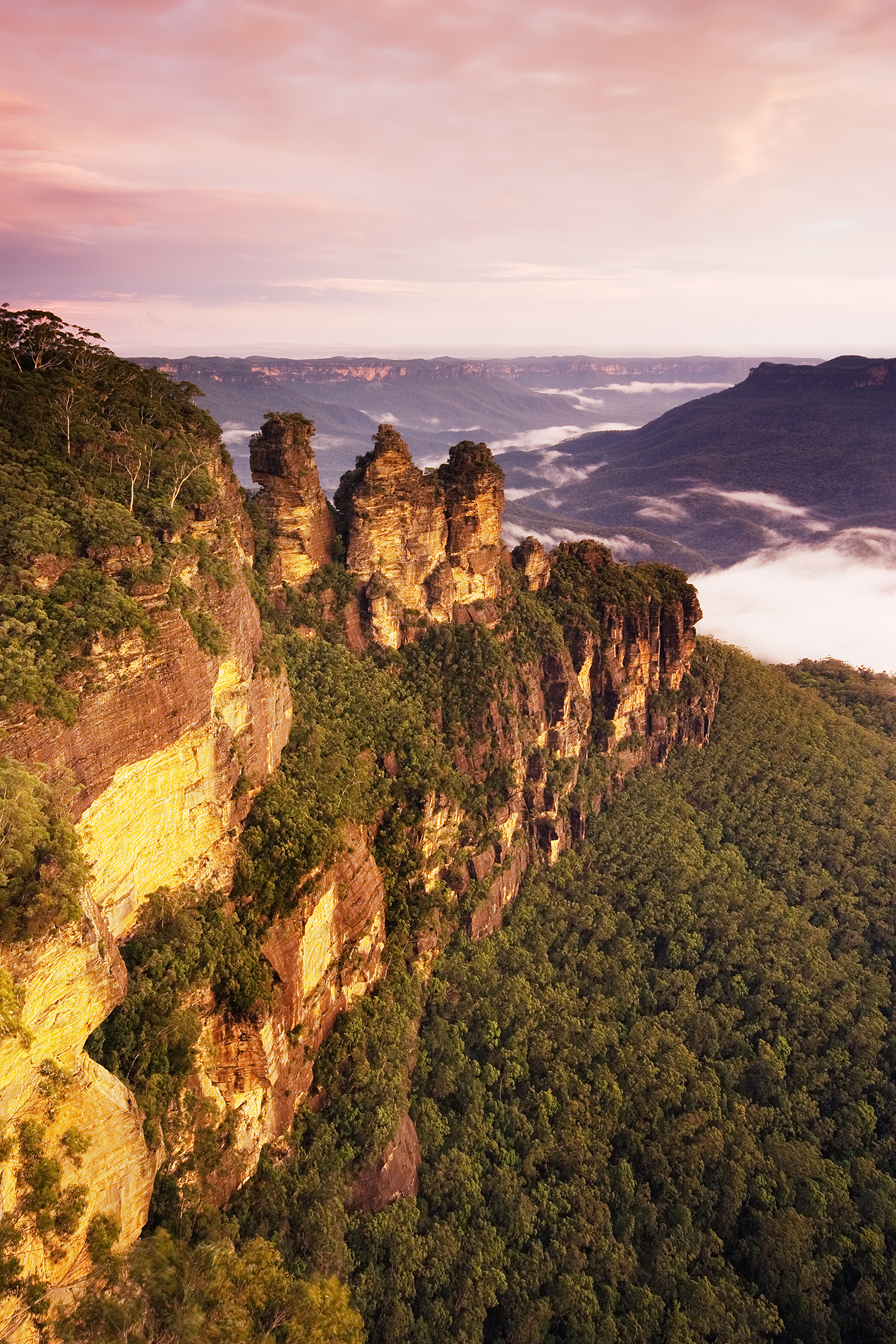
- The Three Sisters sandstone rock formation, one of the region's best-known attractions
- Coordinates: 33°36′S 150°21′E
- Country: Australia
- State: New South Wales
- LGAs: Blue Mountains City Council; Hawkesbury City Council; Penrith City Council; Wollondilly Shire Council
- Location: 50 km (31 mi) NW of Sydney CBD

Government
  - State electorates: Blue Mountains; Penrith
  - Federal divisions: Macquarie; Lindsay; Calare

Area
  - Total: 11,400 km^{2} (4,400 sq mi)

Population
  - Total: 30,049 (UCL 2021)
Regions around Blue Mountains
Central West	Central West	Hunter
Central West	Blue Mountains	Greater Western Sydney
Southern Tablelands	Southern Tablelands	Macarthur

Blue Mountains Range
- Blue Mountains
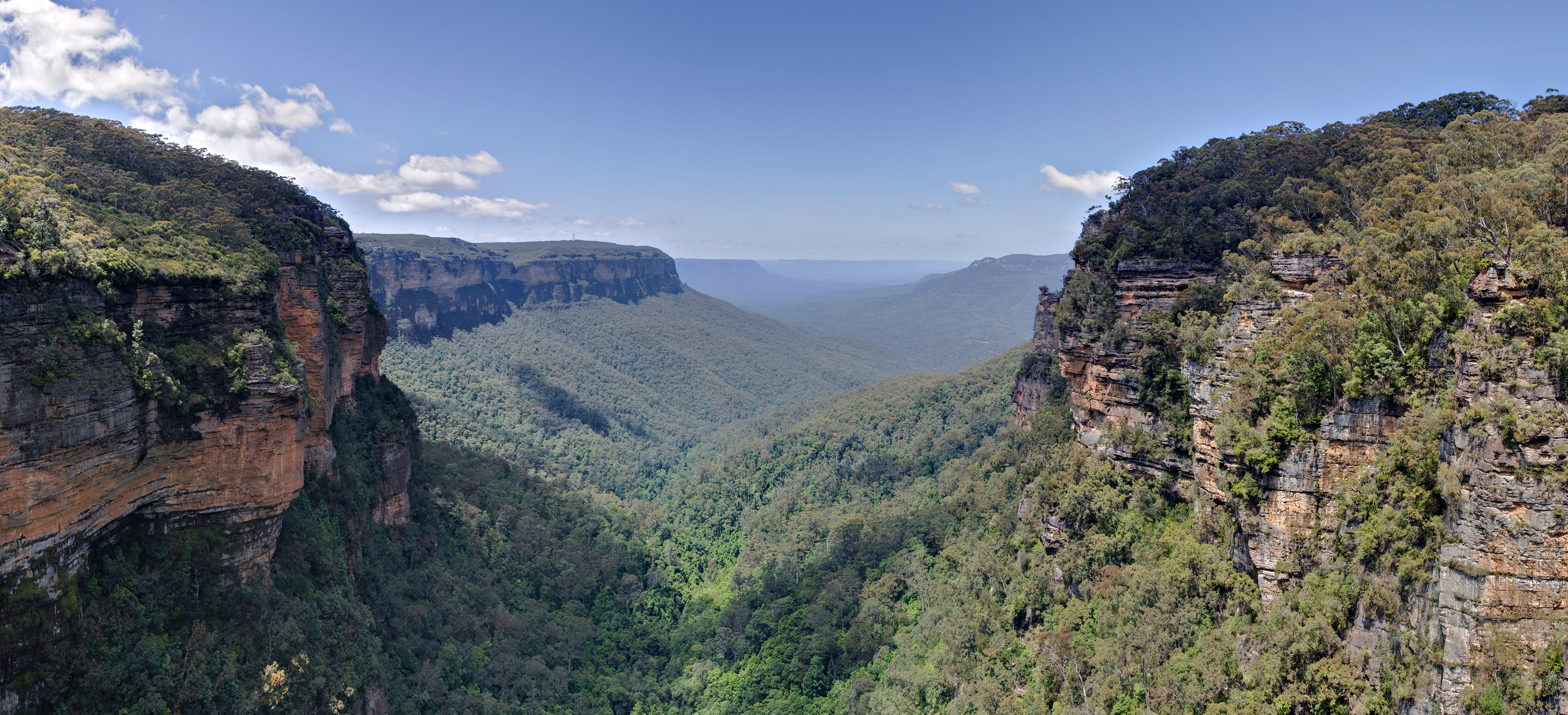
- The characteristic blue haze, as seen in the Jamison Valley

Highest point
- Peak: unnamed peak, north-east of Lithgow
- Elevation: 1,189 m (3,901 ft); AHD

Dimensions
- Length: 96 km (60 mi) NW/SE

Geography
- Location within New South Wales
- Country: Australia
- State: New South Wales

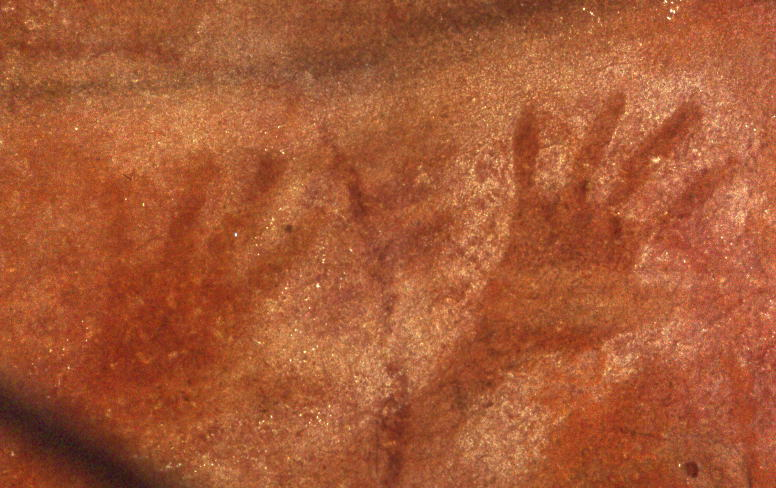
Aboriginal hand stencils in Red Hands Cave, near Glenbrook

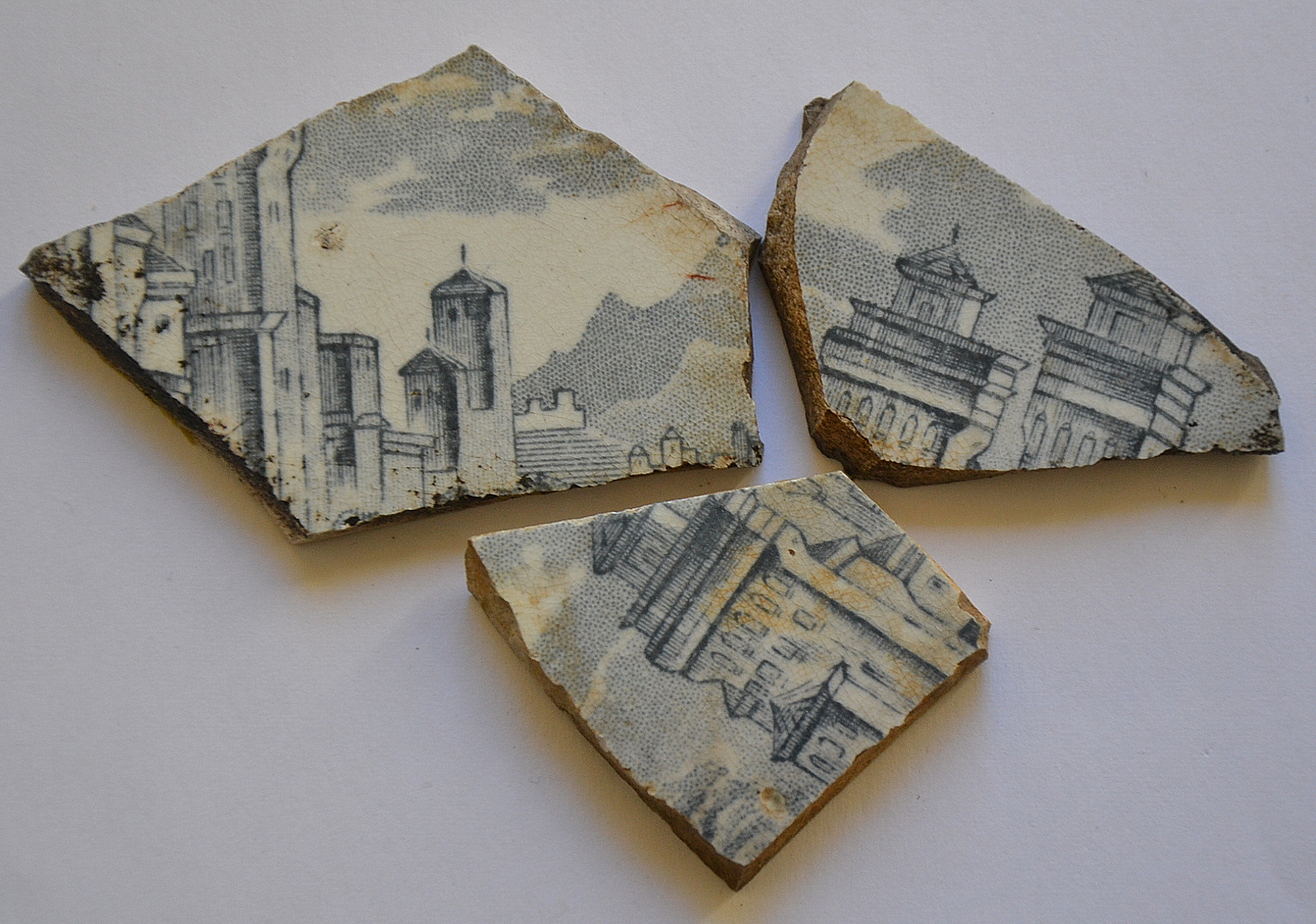
Broken china from ruins near Asgard Swamp, where a coal mine was opened in the nineteenth century

The Blue Mountains (Gundungurra/Dharug: Colomatta or Gulumada) are a mountainous region and a mountain range located in New South Wales, Australia. The region is considered to be part of the western outskirts of the Greater Sydney area. The region borders on Sydney's main metropolitan area, its foothills starting about 50 kilometres (31 mi) west of centre of the state capital, close to Penrith. The public's understanding of the extent of the Blue Mountains is varied, as it forms only part of an extensive mountainous area associated with the Great Dividing Range. As defined in 1970, the Blue Mountains region is bounded by the Nepean and Hawkesbury rivers in the east, the Coxs River and Lake Burragorang to the west and south, and the Wolgan and Colo rivers to the north. Geologically, it is situated in the central parts of the Sydney Basin.

The Blue Mountains Range comprises a range of mountains, plateau escarpments extending off the Great Dividing Range about 4.8 kilometres (3.0 mi) northwest of Wolgan Gap in a generally southeasterly direction for about 96 kilometres (60 mi), terminating at Emu Plains. For about two-thirds of its length it is traversed by the Great Western Highway, the Main Western railway line and the proposed Blue Mountains tunnel. Several established towns are situated on its heights, including Katoomba, Blackheath, Mount Victoria, and Springwood. The range forms the watershed between Coxs River to the south and the Grose and Wolgan rivers to the north. The range contains the Explorer Range and the Bell Range.

Once considered impassable by settlers, the 1813 expedition by Blaxland, Wentworth and Lawson opened up the interior to British settlement. Today, the Blue Mountains area includes the local government area of the City of Blue Mountains. Since the early 2010s, the region's biodiversity and infrastructure has been severely affected by massive bushfires of unprecedented size and impact. In 2018, 8.4 million people visited the Blue Mountains. The Blue Mountains and Southern Highlands Basalt Forests is a prominent forest community within the ecoregion.

== Etymology ==
The original name for the Blue Mountains in the language of the Dharug and Gundungurra peoples is Colomatta (more accurately pronounced Gulu-mada). The meaning of the name is "koala place" from colo + matta.

Following European settlement of the Sydney area, the area was named the Carmarthen and Lansdowne Hills by Arthur Phillip in 1788. The Carmarthen Hills were in the north of the region and the Lansdowne Hills were in the south. The name Blue Mountains, however, was preferred and is derived from the blue tinge the range takes on when viewed from a distance. The tinge is believed to be caused by Mie scattering which occurs when incoming light with shorter wavelengths is preferentially scattered by particles within the atmosphere imparting a blue-greyish colour to any distant objects, including mountains and clouds. Volatile terpenoids emitted in large quantities by the abundant eucalyptus trees in the Blue Mountains may cause Mie scattering and thus the blue haze for which the mountains were named.

== History ==
=== Geological history ===
A sandstone plateau dominated by a landscape of eucalyptus forests, the Blue Mountains are located at the top of a 470-million-year-old quartzite. In the Permian period, a shallow sea covered the region, when rivers brought shales, siltstones and mudstones. Then during the Mesozoic period, rivers dumped vast amounts of sand, burying the other sedimentary rocks. By about 1 million years ago during the Pliocene era, the Blue Mountains began to form, carving out deep valleys and steep cliffs, with an elevation of 3,900 feet.

Along the eastern margin of the lower Blue Mountains is the Lapstone Monocline, part of the approximately 95 km (59 mi)-long Lapstone Structural Complex. The complex consists of a north–south-trending system of monoclines and faults separating the lower Blue Mountains from the Cumberland Plain. The prominent east-facing monocline is interpreted as a fault-propagation fold developed above a west-dipping thrust fault, and has contributed to the uplift and topographic development of the eastern Blue Mountains.

=== Aboriginal inhabitants ===
The Blue Mountains have been inhabited for millennia by the Gundungurra people, now represented by the Gundungurra Tribal Council Aboriginal Corporation based in Katoomba, and, in the lower Blue Mountains, by the Darug people, now represented by the Darug Tribal Aboriginal Corporation.

The Gundungurra creation story of the Blue Mountains tells that Dreaming creatures Mirigan and Garangatch, half fish and half reptile, fought an epic battle which scarred the landscape into the Jamison Valley.

The Gundungurra Tribal Council is a nonprofit organisation representing the Gundungurra traditional owners, promoting heritage and culture and providing a support for Gundungurra people connecting back to Country.

Gundungurra Tribal Council Aboriginal Corporation has a registered Native Title Claim since 1995 over their traditional lands, which include the Blue Mountains and surrounding areas.

Examples of Aboriginal habitation can be found in many places. In the Red Hands Cave, a rock shelter near Glenbrook, the walls contain hand stencils from adults and children. On the southern side of Queen Elizabeth Drive, at Wentworth Falls, a rocky knoll has a large number of grinding grooves created by rubbing stone implements on the rock to shape and sharpen them. There are also carved images of animal tracks and an occupation cave. The site is known as Kings Tableland Aboriginal Place and dates back 22,000 years.

=== Australian colonial history ===
Arthur Phillip, the first governor of New South Wales, first glimpsed the extent of the Blue Mountains from a ridge at the site of today's Oakhill College, Castle Hill. He named them the Carmarthen Hills, "some forty to sixty miles distant..." and he reckoned that the ground was "most suitable for government stock". This is the location where Gidley King in 1799 established a prison town for political prisoners from Ireland and Scotland.

The first documented use of the name Blue Mountains appears in Captain John Hunter's account of Phillip's 1789 expedition up the Hawkesbury River. Describing the events of about 5 July, Hunter wrote: "We frequently, in some of the reaches which we passed through this day, saw very near us the hills, which we suppose as seen from Port Jackson, and called by the governor the Blue Mountains." During the nineteenth century the name was commonly applied to the portion of the Great Dividing Range from about Goulburn in the south to the Hunter Valley in the north, but in time it came to be associated with a more limited area.

The native Aborigines knew two routes across the mountains: Bilpin Ridge, which is now the location of Bells Line of Road between Richmond and Bell, and the Coxs River, a tributary of the Nepean River. It could be followed upstream to the open plains of the Kanimbla Valley, the type of country that farmers prize.

British settlers initially considered that fertile lands lay beyond the mountains; while in the belief of many convicts China lay beyond. However, there was little fear that the mountains might provide a means of escape since they were considered impassable. This idea was, to some extent, convenient for local authorities. An "insurmountable" barrier would deter convicts from trying to escape in that direction.

A former convict, John Wilson, may have been the first colonist to cross the Blue Mountains. It is also believed that Matthew Everingham, 1795, may have also been partly successful based on letters he wrote at the time which came to light in the late 1980s. Wilson arrived with the First Fleet in 1788 and was freed in 1792. He settled in the bush, living with the Aborigines and even functioning as an intermediary between them and the settlers. In 1797 he returned to Sydney, claiming to have explored up to a hundred miles in all directions around Sydney, including across the mountains. His descriptions and observations were generally accurate, and it is possible that he had crossed the mountains via the southern aspect at the Coxs River corridor, guided by the Aborigines.

Governor Hunter was impressed by Wilson's skills and sent him on an expedition with John Price and others in January 1798. The party crossed the Nepean River and moved southwest towards the present site of Mittagong. There they turned west and found a route along the ridge where today the Wombeyan Caves Road is located. In the process they found a way to go west of the mountains, by going around them instead of across them. In March of the same year, Wilson and Price ventured to the Camden area, and then continued further south until they encountered Thirlmere Lakes, finally almost reaching the present site of Goulburn.

It is possible that the accomplishments of this expedition were suppressed by Hunter, who may not have wanted convicts to know that there was a relatively easy way out of Sydney. Wilson was killed by Aborigines after abducting an Aboriginal woman "for his personal use", but he had accomplished much as an explorer. He was never recognised as the first person to cross the mountains, possibly because his Coxs River journey could not be verified, while his route west of Mittagong may have been the "long way around" for a colony that had its eyes fixed on the sandstone fortress west of the Nepean.

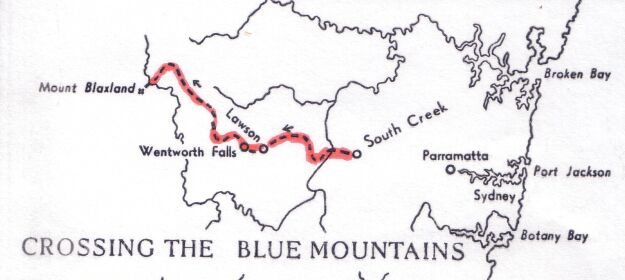
Route of the Blaxland, Lawson, and Wentworth Crossing of 1813

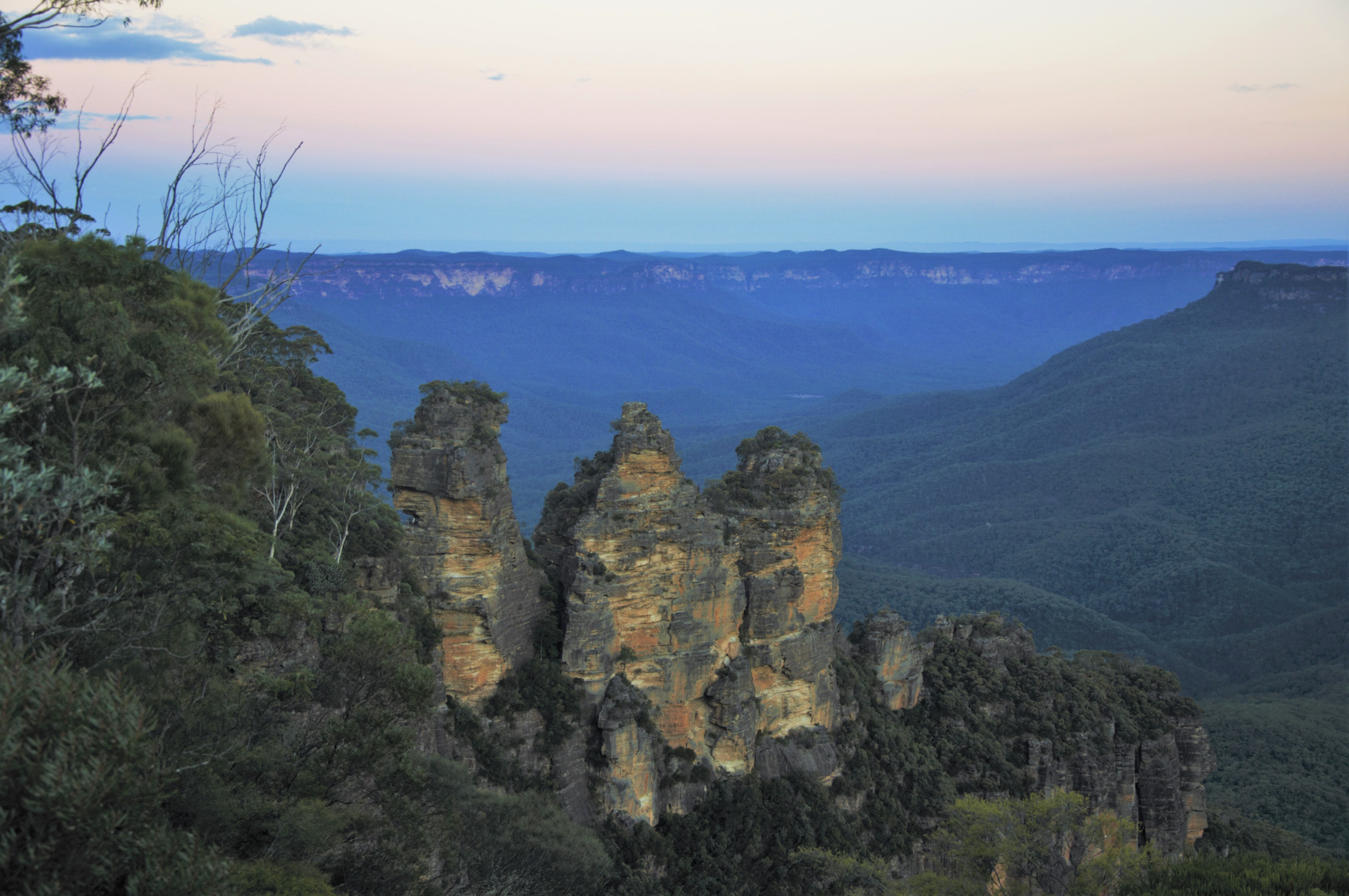
The typical blue haze in the Jamison Valley behind the Three Sisters, New South Wales, Australia.

Between 1798 and 1813, many people explored various parts of the mountains, from the Bilpin Ridge to the southern regions, today the site of the Kanangra-Boyd National Park. Still, they did not find a definite route across the mountains. The 1813 crossing of the Blue Mountains by Gregory Blaxland, William Lawson and William Charles Wentworth is officially credited as the first successful European crossing. Blaxland set out with Lawson and Wentworth on 11 May 1813 and succeeded in crossing the mountains by 31 May. They ventured as far as to what is now Mount Blaxland, just west of Coxs River.

In November 1813, Macquarie sent the surveyor George Evans on an expedition to confirm the apparent discoveries made by Blaxland and his party. He was also told to see if there existed enough arable land to justify settlement. The issue had become more urgent because the colony was in the grips of a drought.

Evans and his party reached the Fish and Macquarie rivers, and the site of Bathurst. On 7 July 1814, construction of a road across the mountains was begun by William Cox. The work was at the behest of Governor Macquarie. 30 convict labourers and 8 guards completed the road on 14 January 1815 after 27 weeks of hard work.

Since the Blue Mountains are rich in coal and shale, mining for these resources began in Hartley Vale in 1865. J.B. North ran a shale mine in the Jamison Valley in the 19th century, and other operations were set up in several places. Locations for mining activities included the Jamison Valley, the upper Grose Valley, Newnes, Glen Davis and the Asgard Swamp area outside Mount Victoria. Shale mining failed in the long run because it was not profitable.

In 2000, the Greater Blue Mountains Area, a vast area of wilderness in the Blue Mountains for its exceptional biodiversity, was enlisted by UNESCO and categorized itself as a natural World Heritage Site.

On 18 July 2023, a proposal for a naming board in a dual Aboriginal name was discussed by the Geographical Names Board of New South Wales whether the Blue Mountains would be officially named Gulumada.

== Climate ==
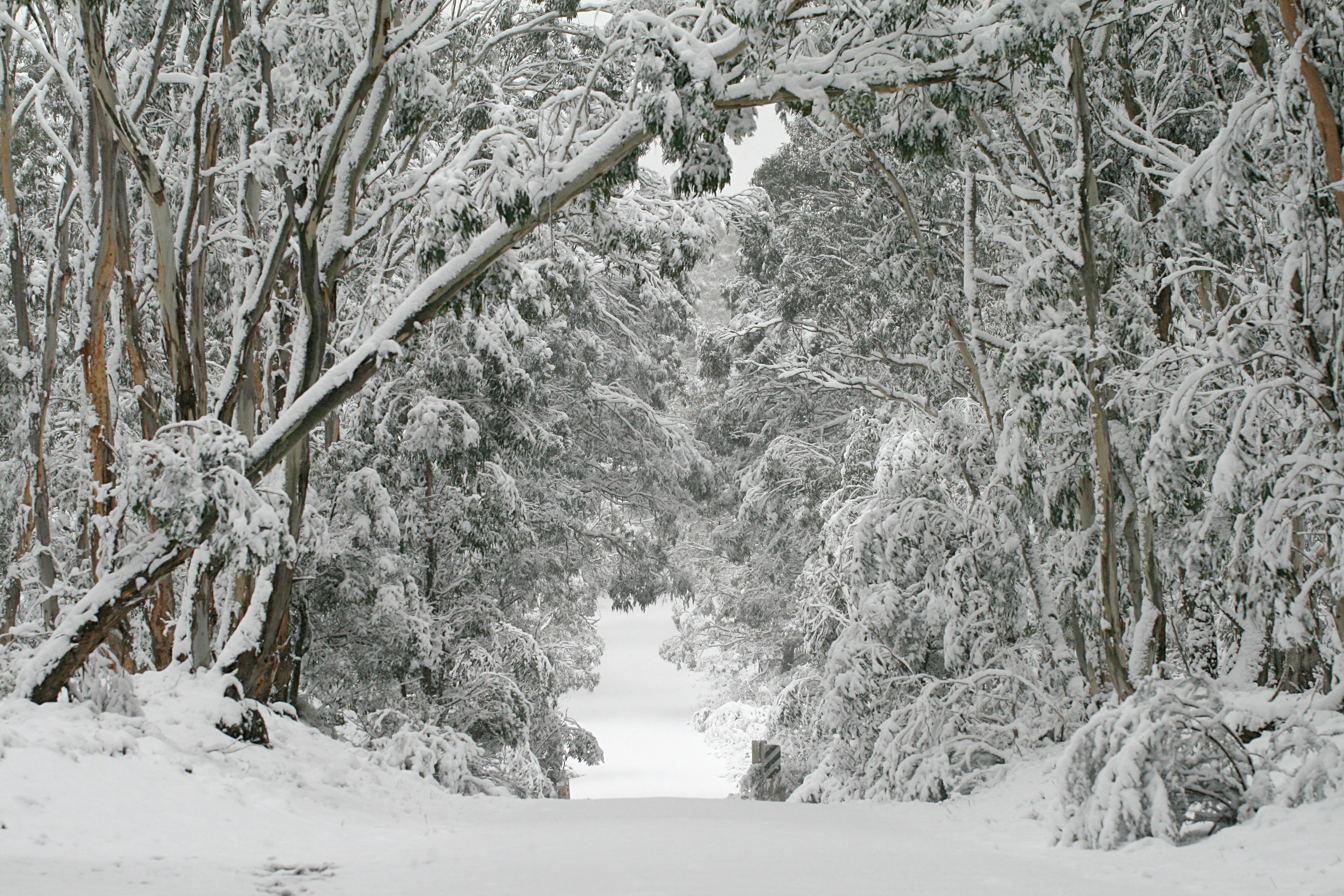
Kanangra-Boyd National Park after a snowfall.

Autumn foliage in the Blue Mountains

The climate varies with elevation. At Katoomba, (1,010 m or 3,314 ft) the summer average maximum temperature is around 22 °C with a few days extending into the 30s (80s–90s °F) although it is quite common to see maximum temperatures stay in the teens when east coast troughs persist. Night-time temperatures are usually in the teens but can drop to single figures at times.

During winter, the temperature is typically around 10 to 11 °C in the daytime with −1 °C or so on clear nights and 3 to 4 °C on cloudy nights. Very occasionally it will get down to −3 °C or slightly lower but usually the coldest air drains into the valleys during calm, clear nights. However, the passing of cold fronts can significantly lower the average temperature during the night and the day. The Blue Mountains is not known for particularly cold mornings compared to other areas on the Central Tablelands, such as Oberon, Bathurst and Orange. There are two to three snowfalls per year.

Annual rainfall is about 1,050 millimetres (41 in) in the Upper Blue Mountains with many misty days.

== Geography ==
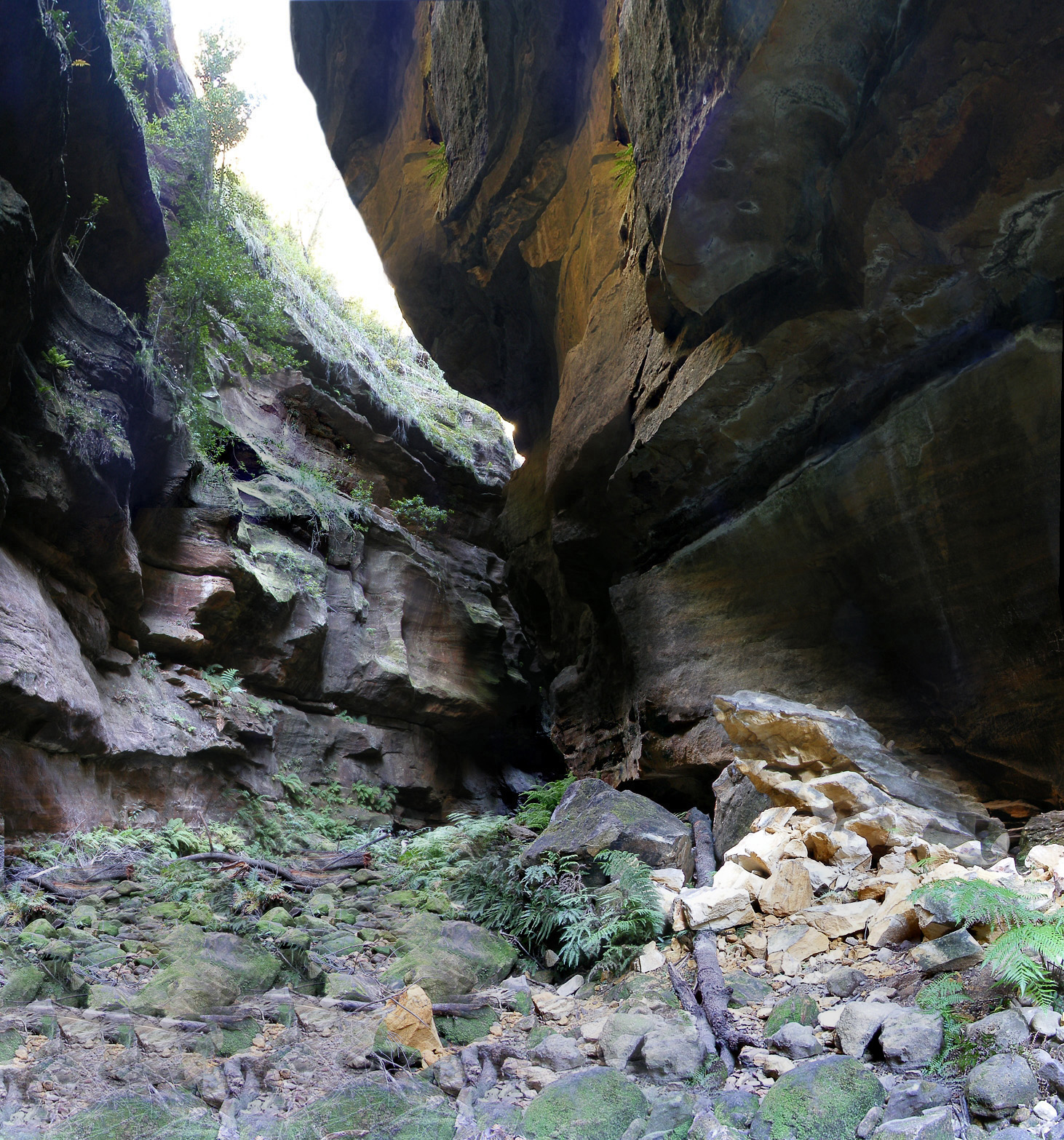
Neates Glen, outside Blackheath

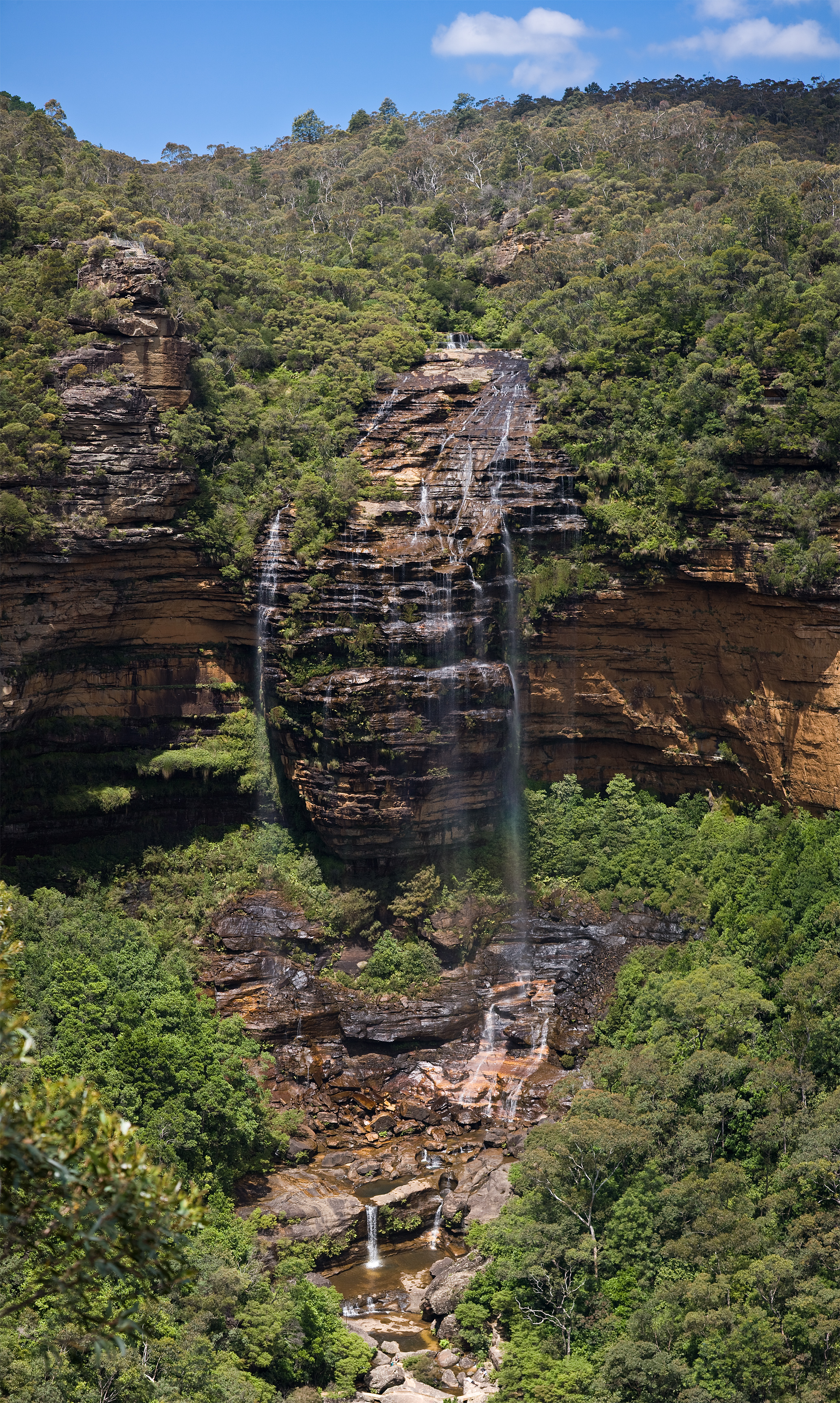
Upper Wentworth Falls as viewed along the National Pass walking track near the town of Wentworth Falls

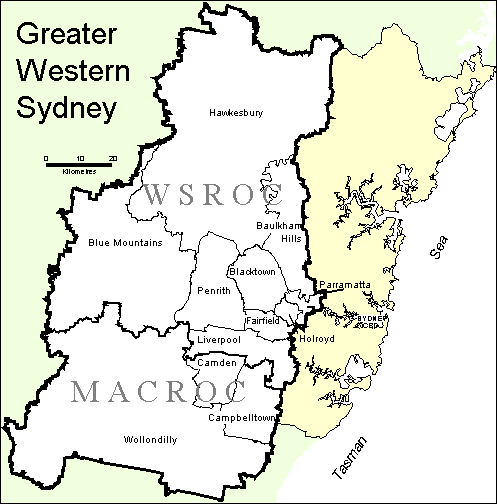
The Greater Blue Mountains Area is considered to be part of Greater Western Sydney region.

The predominant natural vegetation of the higher ridges is eucalyptus forest. Heath-like vegetation is present on plateau edges above cliffs. The sheltered gorges often contain temperate rainforests. There are also many hanging swamps with button grass reeds and thick, deep black soil. Wollemia nobilis, the "Wollemi pine", a relict of earlier vegetation of Gondwana, is found in remote and isolated valleys of the Wollemi National Park.

=== Mountain peaks ===
The Blue Mountains Range contains smaller mountain ranges: the Bell Range near The Bells Line of Road and north of the Grose River; the Explorer Range, south of the Grose River extending west towards Mount Victoria; the Caley Range, Erskine Range, Mount Hay Range, Paterson Range, and the Woodford Range. The major recorded peaks are:

- unnamed peak (1,189 m or 3,901 ft)
- Mount Piddington (1,094 m or 3,589 ft)
- Mount Boyce (1,093 m or 3,586 ft)
- Mount York (1,061 m or 3,481 ft)
- Mount Banks (1,049 m or 3,442 ft)
- Mount Wilson (1,008 m or 3,307 ft)
- Kings Tableland (1,000 m or 3,281 ft)
- Narrow Neck Plateau (1,000 m or 3,281 ft)
- Mount Solitary (950 m or 3,117 ft)
- Mount Hay (944 m or 3,097 ft)
- Mount Irvine (850 m or 2,789 ft)

The Blue Mountains are a dissected plateau carved in sandstone bedrock. They are now a series of ridge lines separated by gorges up to 760 metres (2,490 ft) deep. The highest point in the Blue Mountains, as it is now defined, is an unnamed point with an elevation of 1,189 m (3,901 ft) AHD, located 7 kilometres (4.3 mi) north-east of Lithgow. However, the highest point in the broader region that was once considered to be the Blue Mountains is Mount Bindo, with an elevation 1,362 m (4,469 ft) AHD. A large part of the Blue Mountains is incorporated into the Greater Blue Mountains Area World Heritage Site, consisting of seven national park areas and a conservation reserve.

The Blue Mountains area is a distinct physiographic section of the larger Hunter-Hawkesbury Sunkland province. This is in turn a part of the larger East Australian Cordillera physiographic division.

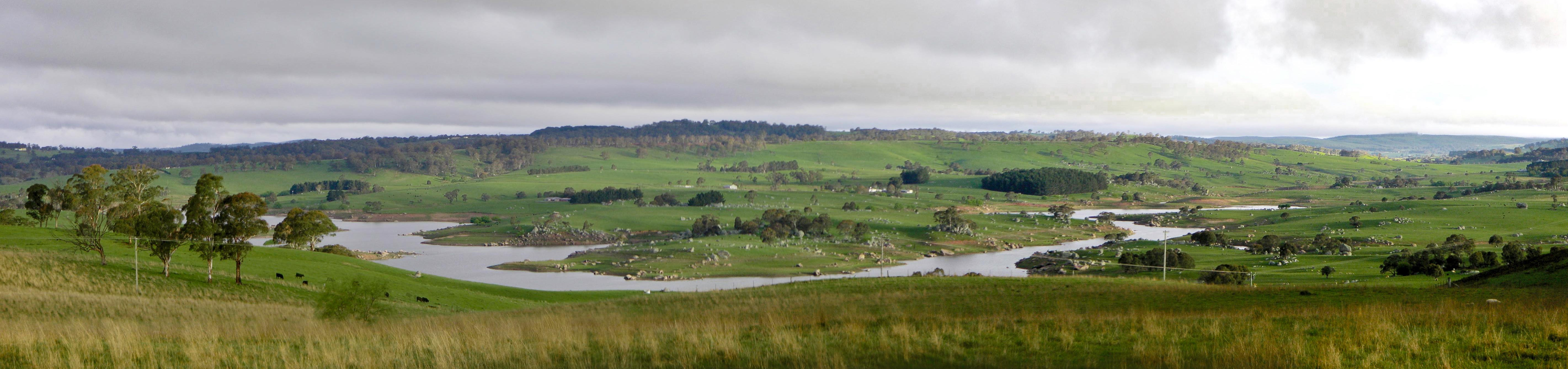
Megalong Valley

=== Bushfires ===
The main natural disasters to afflict the area are bushfires and severe storms. In recent years the lower mountains have been subjected to a series of bushfires which have caused great loss of property but relatively little loss of life. The upper mountains had not had a major fire for some decades until December 2002 (the Blackheath Glen Fire) and November 2006 when an extensive blaze in the Grose Valley threatened several communities including Bell and Blackheath (the Lawsons Long Alley Fire). This latest fire burned for almost a month but was extinguished, mainly due to a change in the weather, without loss of human life or property. A program of winter burning seemed to have been successful in reducing fires in the upper mountains.

In recent years, the bushfires have become far more destructive and expansive than before. The region was severely damaged in the 2013 New South Wales bushfires. However, even this was dwarfed by the 2019–20 Australian bushfire season, during which the entire mountain range was devastated at a scale never seen before. According to preliminary reports, up to 80% of the World Heritage Area has burned as of January 2020, many of these being areas that had never burned in any previously observed bushfires. These destructive blazes have been linked to accelerating climate change. There have been fears that the blazes may severely reduce the biodiversity of the area and even wipe out some of the threatened species in the area, such as the regent honeyeater.

== World Heritage listing ==
The Greater Blue Mountains Area was unanimously listed as a World Heritage Area by UNESCO on 29 November 2000, becoming the fourth area in New South Wales to be listed. The area totals roughly 10,000 square kilometres (3,900 sq mi), including the Blue Mountains, Kanangra-Boyd, Wollemi, Gardens of Stone, Yengo, Nattai and Thirlmere Lakes National Parks, plus the Jenolan Caves Karst Conservation Reserve.

This site was chosen to be included on the World Heritage list because:

"Criteria (ii) and (iv): Australia's eucalypt vegetation is worthy of recognition as of outstanding universal value, because of its adaptability and evolution in post-Gondwana isolation. The site contains a wide and balanced representation of eucalypt habitats from wet and dry sclerophyll, mallee heathlands, as well as localised swamps, wetlands, and grassland. 90 eucalypti tax (13% of the global total) and representation of all four groups of eucalypts occur. There is also a high level of endemism with 114 endemic taxa found in the area as well as 120 nationally rare and threatened plant taxa. The site hosts several evolutionary relic species (Wollemia, Microstrobos, Acrophyllum) which have persisted in highly restricted micro sites."

== Fauna ==
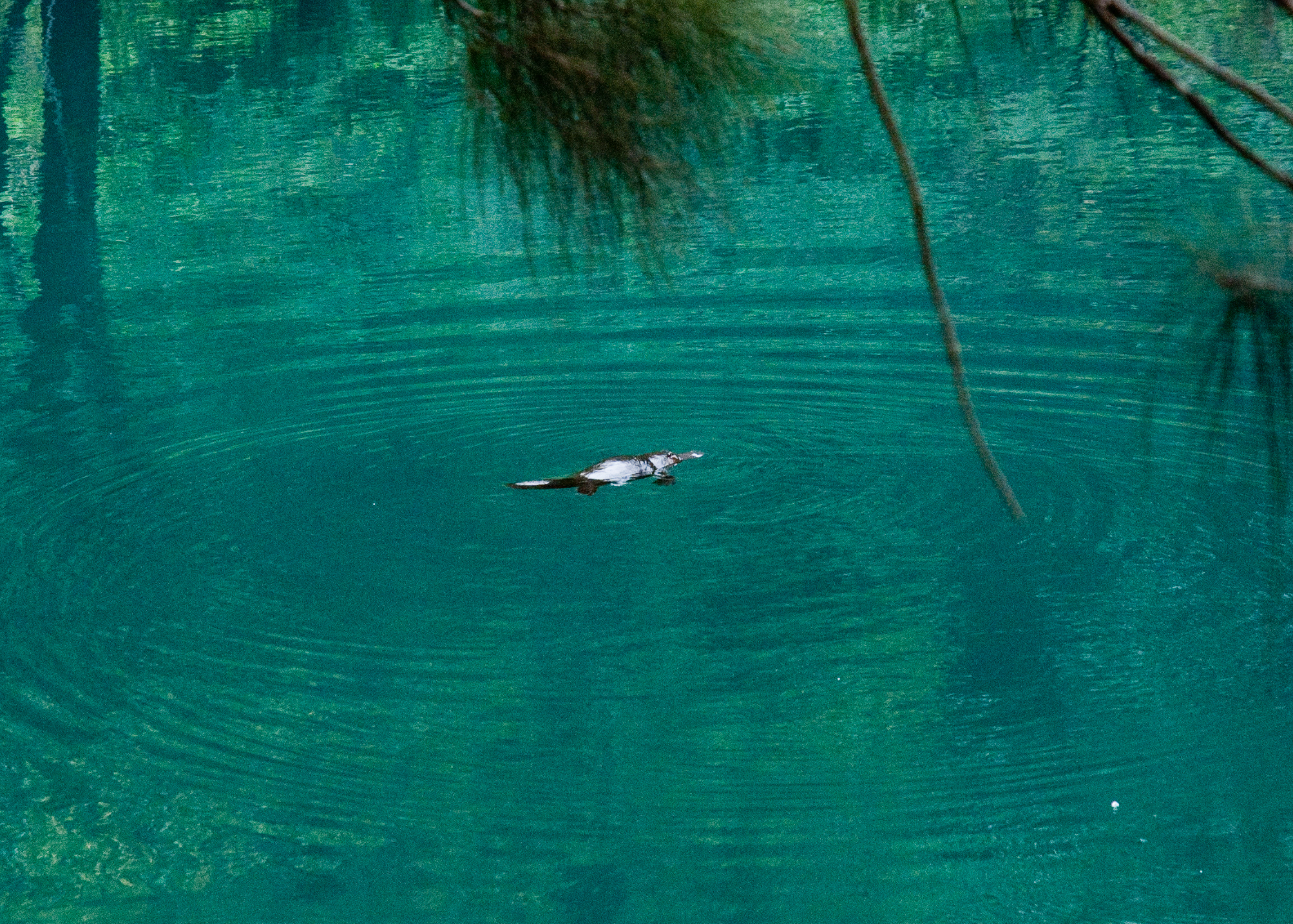
Platypus in the Blue Mountains

The Greater Blue Mountains Area is inhabited by over 400 different forms of animals. Among them are rare mammal species like spotted-tailed quoll, the koala, the yellow-bellied glider, and long-nosed potoroo. There are also some rare reptiles, like the Blue Mountain water skink. There are also some dingoes in the area, which form the top predators and hunt for grey kangaroos.

== Tourist attractions ==
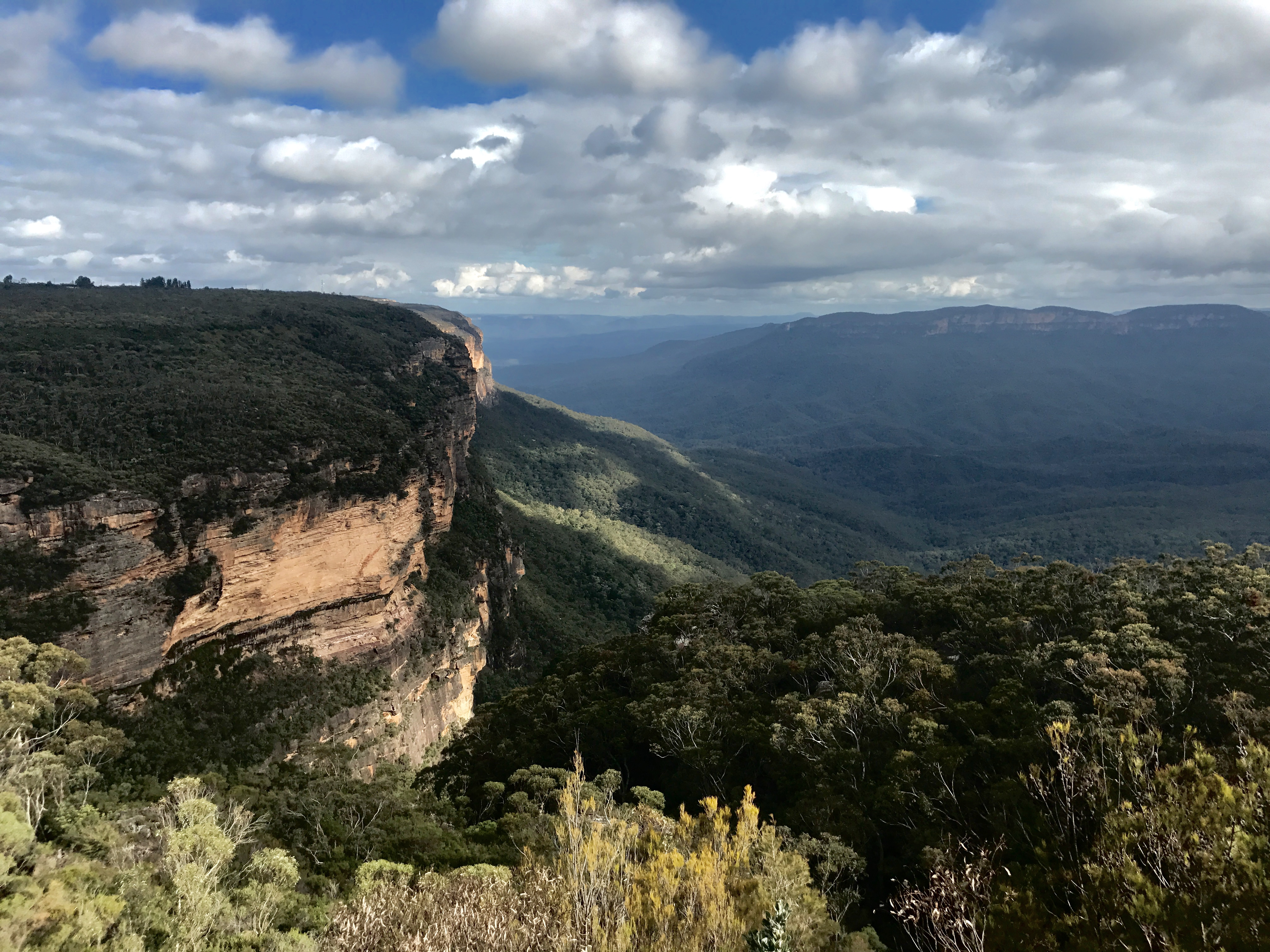
- View from Wentworth Falls carpark
  The Three Sisters near Katoomba, New South Wales is one of Australia's most-photographed landmarks.
- The Giant Stairway walking track runs down a cliff into the Jamison Valley, near the Three Sisters, providing access to nature walks through the valley.
- Jenolan Caves, a series of limestone caves south west of Katoomba.
- The Katoomba Scenic Railway is an incline railway now used for tourism, and originally part of the Katoomba mining tramways constructed between 1878 and 1900. The incline railway descends 415 m (453.85 yd) through sandstone cliffs, via a rock tunnel with a maximum gradient of 52 degrees. Also, at this location is the Scenic Skyway, a glass-bottom aerial cable car that traverses an arm of the Jamison Valley, and the Scenic Cableway, the steepest aerial cable car in Australia.
- The Norman Lindsay Gallery and Museum at Faulconbridge, operated by The National Trust of Australia and is located inside the former Norman Lindsay homestead, Springwood.
- Knapsack Viaduct, also a location where the bell miner bird can often be heard.
- Lennox Bridge, Glenbrook, on Mitchell's Pass which may be hiked (downhill) from Blaxland to Emu Plains (8 km).
- Valley Heights Locomotive Depot Heritage Museum.
- The Zig Zag Railway: A steam-powered railway near Lithgow.
- Popular ways to visit the Blue Mountains include - by train, by coach, by private car or small group tour.
- The last remaining apple orchard on the Shipley Plateau.
- The Prime Ministers' Corridor of Oaks, at Faulconbridge, near the Great Western Highway.
- Red Hands Cave in the Blue Mountains National Park near Glenbrook is one of the best examples of Aboriginal art in the area.
- Lincoln's Rock in Wentworth Falls, New South Wales offers spectacular views of the Jamison Valley. Formerly known as Flat Rock, it was named after Australian mountaineer Lincoln Hall (climber) in 2013.

== Recreational activity ==
The Blue Mountains are a popular destination for rock climbers, mountain bikers and hikers as well as canyoning and other adventure sports. These sports are well catered for by guiding companies and equipment stores located mainly in Katoomba.

Popular climbing destinations include the Centennial Glen cliffs near Blackheath and Mount Piddington near the town of Mount Victoria. Climbing is currently banned on The Three Sisters.

Mountain biking takes place mainly on the many fire trails that branch away from the main spine of the Great Western Highway, such as Narrow Neck, Anderson's Fire Trail and others.

Likewise many of the fire trails are popular with day hikers, though many dedicated walking trails exist away from the fire roads.

Canyoning in the Blue Mountains is considered to be a popular sport and caters to various skill levels. It carries inherent dangers, yet for those with the appropriate skills or those looking to take a guided trip there are many opportunities to experience a different view of the Blue Mountains.

There are numerous abseiling options available in the Blue Mountains including single and multipitch routes. There are some restrictions though with certain areas being closed for abseiling.

Cricket is a popular sport in the Blue Mountains, with the Blue Mountains Cattle Dogs representing the district in the Western Zone Premier League, Country Plate and Presidents Cup competitions.

== Collapse of the Dog Face Rock cliff face ==
At 4 am on 28 January 1931 a cliff face known as "the Dog Face Rock" collapsed into the Jamison Valley in the Blue Mountains. A second collapse from the same cliff face occurred on 2 May 1931.

== Injuries and deaths ==
It was reported that "More than 450 incidents resulting in greater than 200 deaths between 1875 and 2021..." have occurred. Every year there are up to 200 people who are lost or injured in the Blue Mountains.

In 2022, two people died and two were injured when they were on a walking track in Wentworth Falls, and were hit by debris from a landslide.

== Gallery ==
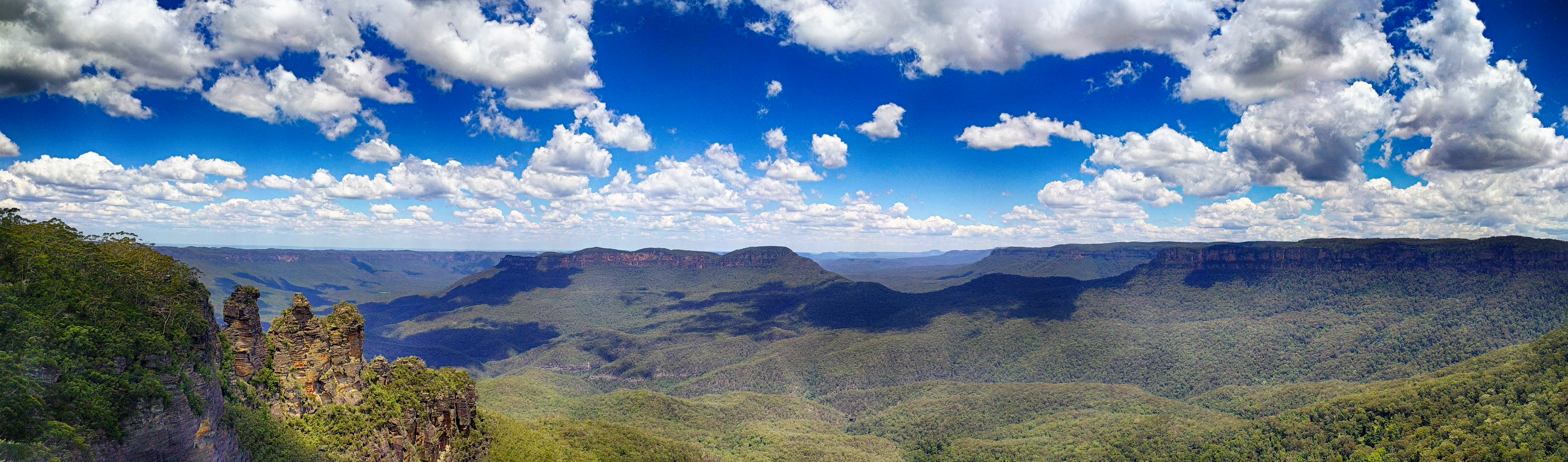
View of Jamison Valley from north escarpment, outside Katoomba:Three Sisters far left; Mount Solitary left of centre; Narrowneck Plateau, far right

== See also ==
- Aboriginal sites of New South Wales
- Blue Mountains National Park
- Greater Blue Mountains Area
- List of mountains in Australia
- Geography of Sydney
