= Prime Ministers' Corridor of Oaks =

Prime Ministers Corridor of Oaks
- Jackson Park, Faulconbridge, Australia
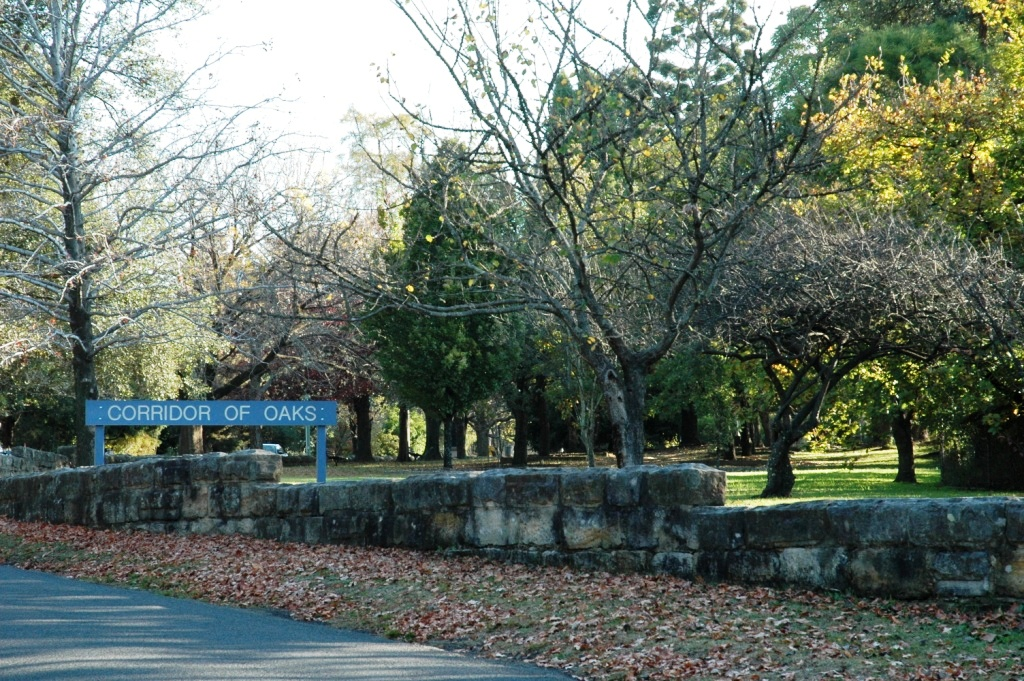
- For Australian Prime Ministers
- Unveiled: 1933
- Location: 33°41′43″S 150°32′21″E near Faulconbridge, New South Wales
- Designed by: Joseph Jackson

The Prime Ministers' Corridor of Oaks in Faulconbridge, New South Wales, is a local park and national monument that contains an oak tree planted by every prime minister (or their closest relative) since Federation. It is near the Great Western Highway and Main Western railway line. It is also near the grave of Sir Henry Parkes.

== History ==
The idea for the Corridor was envisioned by Joseph Jackson MLA, who represented the Electoral district of Nepean for 33 years. He donated the land on which Jackson Park sits to the people of the Blue Mountains in 1933 for use as a public park. At that time Jackson owned the former home of Sir Henry Parkes and was an ardent admirer of his. He conceived the idea of an avenue of oak trees to be planted by all the prime ministers of Australia or their nearest surviving relative. He hoped that the avenue, growing opposite the Parkes home, would become a national memorial.

The first oak was planted by then Prime Minister Joseph Lyons, on the 12th of September 1934, while on a tour of the Blue Mountains. Further plantings followed in quick succession, with 5 oaks planted in 1935, representing PM's Sir Edmund Barton, Sir George Reid, John Watson, Sir Joseph Cook and William (Billy) Hughes respectively.

John Howard planted his tree in 2000.

Kevin Rudd planted his tree in between his terms, on the 8th of October 2012.

On the 28th of July 2017, Australia's first female PM, Julia Gillard planted her tree.

It is common for Prime Ministers to plant their trees after their term has concluded, with Tony Abbott (2013-2015) planting his tree in 2024, and Malcom Turnbull (2015-2018) planting his tree in 2025. As of 2026, 28 of Australia's 31 Prime Ministers have planted their trees (or had their trees planted by a close relative, if they have died).

Shortly after planting, Tony Abbott's tree was sawn off at the stump. Blue Mountains City Council replaced the tree, which was then vandalised for a second time. The council replaced the tree again, and installed CCTV at the site.

In 2024, Council upgraded the site, installing a boardwalk between the oaks, amongst other amenity upgrades.

== See also ==
- Prime Ministers Avenue — Ballarat, Victoria
