= Caloola Club =

Australian bushwalking and outdoors activity club

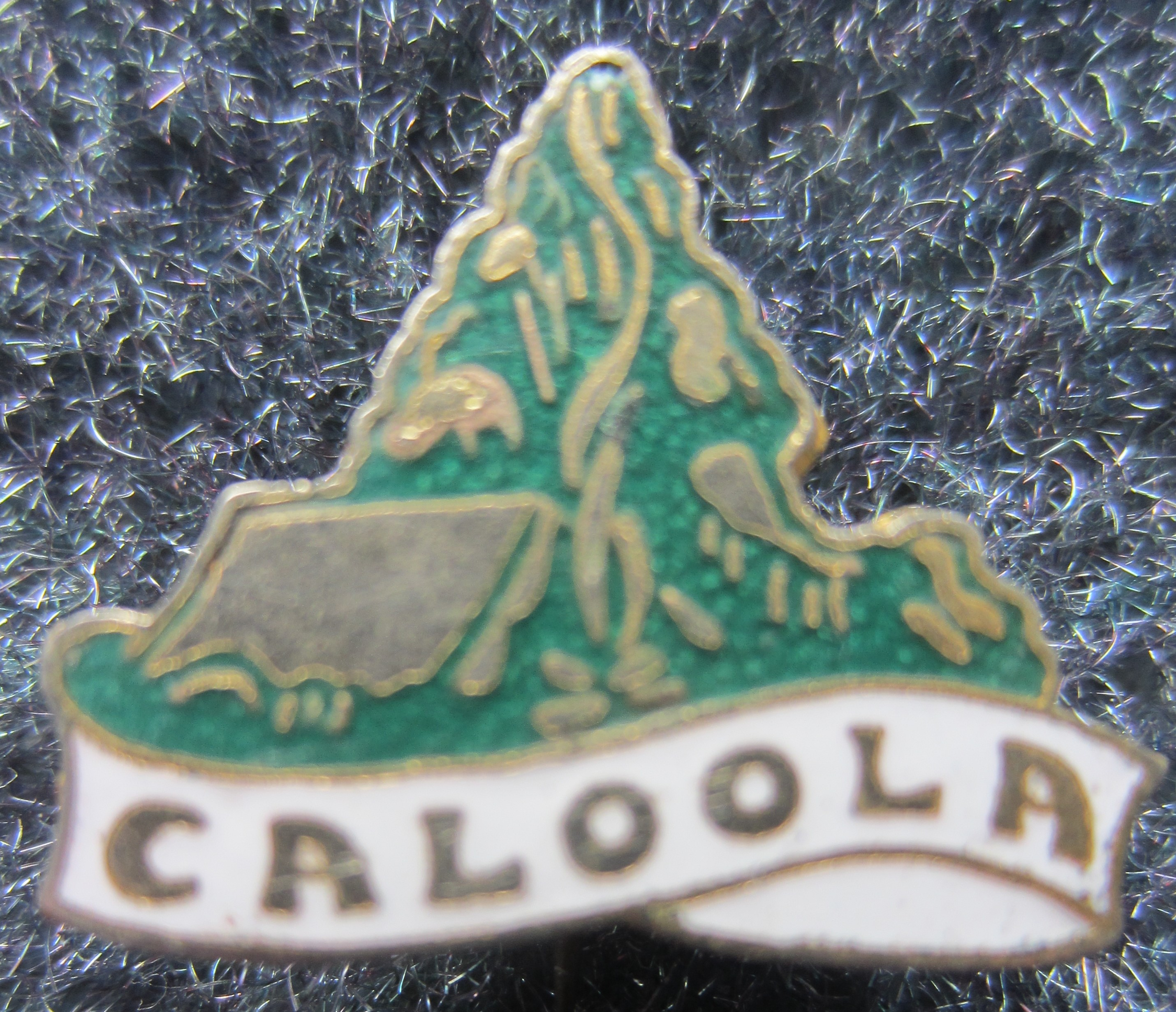
Caloola Club member's badge

The Caloola Club was a bushwalking and outdoors activity club that was based in Sydney, New South Wales, Australia, founded in 1945 and active until 1963, when it merged with the National Parks Association of N.S.W. The club was an influential part of the 'second wave' of the conservation and environmental movement in New South Wales during the post-WWII period.

== Foundation and early days ==
The Caloola Club was founded by Allen Axel Strom and Allan M. Fox—two visionary conservationists—in 1945.

It drew a large part of its membership from students and former students of the Balmain Teachers' College—where Strom lectured—and the Sydney Technical College, where Strom himself had been a student. By 1954, the club had over 300 members. The clubrooms were at 31 Byron Street, Croydon, a suburb of Sydney.

A distinctive feature of the club was that it had a strong educative emphasis. The journal of the club described its aims—in 1955—as follows:

The Caloola Club is an Expedition Society founded to inculcate a love of natural wildernesses, to encourage an appreciation of Conservation and Nature Protection and to widen the knowledge of the Australian Scene. We seek enjoyment in landscape and natural bushlands and are interested in the history, natural history and geography of our country. All our activities are a means of arousing interest in conservational matters ... camping, bushwalking, nature excursion, canoeing, photography, cycling, touring by motor, discussion and lecture ... all are aimed at bringing us closer to the bushlands, the rural countryside and Man’s use of the National Heritage.

Members of the club canoed 400 miles of the Murray River from Towong to Corowa in January 1950.

Using an old truck, driven by member A.W. (Bill) Dingeldei and converted into a bus by his father, members of the club travelled across the state and sometimes interstate, at the same time identifying areas of land, sites, and animal species that were in need of protection.

== Influence on NSW conservation policy ==
As a result of the growing awareness of wildlife conservation and its inherent connection to habitat protection, New South Wales introduced legislation, the Fauna Protection Act 1948 that allowed the declaration of 'faunal reserves', set up the Fauna Protection Panel to advise the minister, and for the first time regulated activities such as kangaroo hunting.

The Caloola Club's founder Alan Strom was a member of the NSW Fauna Protection Panel from 1949. Another member of the Caloola Club, Fred Hersey, became its first field officer with a role of managing conservation of fauna in 1954.

Perhaps due to its close association with the Fauna Protection Panel, the club had a significant positive influence on conservation policy in the 1950s. It was heavily engaged in efforts to expand the areas of New South Wales that were protected as National Parks.

In the early 1950s, the Caloola Club was one of the first organisations to advocate creation of a fauna reserve covering the Myall Lakes. In 1954, the Warrumbungle National Park was created after "many years' of agitation" by the National Parks and Primitive Areas Council (Myles Dunphy), Coonabarabran Shire Council, the Bushwalkers' Federation, Wild Life Preservation Society, and the Caloola Club. Also in 1954, the Caloola Club made a submission to the Chief Guardian of Fauna in NSW calling for the declaration of the Nadgee Faunal Reserve—one of the last pristine wilderness areas on the N.S.W. coast—which occurred in 1957. The Caloola Club was among the organisations supporting efforts to protect the Morton Primitive Area and for it to become Morton National Park, which occurred in 1961.

The club built a log cabin—completed in 1952, and named the Dingeldei Hut after a member—on private land (Tongarra Farm) in the locality of Tongarra, south of the Macquarie Pass. The hut was used as a base for walks. In the same area, a foot track pass through the coastal escarpment is named the Caloola Pass. The club had a strong association with this area and the nearby Barren Grounds. Largely due to the efforts of the club, its founder Allen Strom, and two other leading activists of NSW conservation—Myles Dunphy and Paddy Palin—the Barren Grounds Faunal Reserve was declared in 1956. Another area with a strong association with the Caloola Club—and other bushwalking clubs—is the Bouddi National Park; Caloola Club members were at times trustees of that park.

The Caloola Club became a focus for efforts to establish a branch of the NSW Public Service, which would administer these parks and protect the flora and fauna of the state. Other conservationists, such as Myles Dunphy and his National Parks and Primitive Areas Council, had similar objectives. In 1955, the Caloola Club, set out their options for the formulation of a 'national parks act', which would create a National Park Service to administer the state's national parks, and appoint national park boards to individual parks. The main objectives driving this approach were to achieve longer-term security for national parks and to ensure professional and expert management of the land within those parks.

== Legacy ==
The Caloola Club merged in 1963, with the National Parks Association of New South Wales, which had been formed in 1958. The NPA has a vision very similar to the aims of the Caloola Club and continues its legacy today, both in conservation activism and as a bushwalking club.

An Act of the NSW Parliament—NSW National Parks and Wildlife Act 1967—incorporating the National Parks and Wildlife Service, was proclaimed on 1 October 1967. This new arm of the NSW Public Service took over and merged the functions of the Fauna Protection Panel and the Reserves Branch of the Lands Department. Although the Caloola Club had ceased to exist as a separate entity by then, the Minister for Lands, Tom Lewis—speaking in the second reading speech for the Bill—said of the organisations consulted on the matter that, "Some of these, including the Caloola Club and the Sydney Bush Walkers, have done much to foster the objects of the Bill." This recognised the many years of advocacy by the Caloola Club—and other like-minded groups—for a National Parks Act, and a permanent National Parks and Wildlife Service for N.S.W.

Allen Strom had been appointed Chief Guardian of Fauna in NSW in 1958. However, once the long-term aim—the setting up the National Parks and Wildlife Service as a permanent branch of the NSW Public Service—finally was achieved in 1967, Strom was not appointed to lead the new organisation. Nonetheless, other members of the former Caloola Club, such as Allan Fox and Fred Hersey, took up positions in the newly created service and were influential in its early years. The scope of protected lands was subsequently expanded by the National Parks and Wildlife Act 1974.

A number of parks in N.S.W. were declared after advocacy made, during the 1950s, by the Caloola Club and like-minded organisations; these parks include the Myall Lakes National Park, the Warrumbungle National Park, the Nadgee Faunal Reserve, the Barren Grounds Nature Reserve, and the Morton National Park.

Two different editions of the club's journal, Yarrawonda, are preserved; one in the National Library of Australia and another in the National Museum of Australia. The archives of the State Library of New South Wales contain the papers of Allan Strom—with photographs and other material relating to the club—and, in the collection of papers of the pioneering conservationist Myles Dunphy, textual material relating to the club and Dunphy's correspondence with it.

Other legacies of the Caloola Club are less tangible; many of its members were school teachers and others in a position to spread knowledge and awareness of the natural world to the next generation. The club contributed to the growth of an awareness of the natural world, the need for nature conservation, and for park management methods based on a scientific approach to conservation.

Both founders of the Caloola Club, Allen Strom and Alan Fox, were in their later lives recipients of a N.S.W. Environmental Educator Award.

== See also ==
- Sydney Bush Walkers Club
- The Bush Club
