= Pallin =

Pallin is a surname. It may refer to:

- Adam Pallin, American record producer, songwriter and multi-instrumentalist
- Paddy Pallin, Australian bushwalking and camping equipment retailer
  - Paddy Pallin ski classic, a cross country ski event
- Rob Pallin, American professional ice hockey coach

== See also ==
- Palin
