= Marie Byles =

Australian lawyer, explorer, and conservationist (1900–1979)

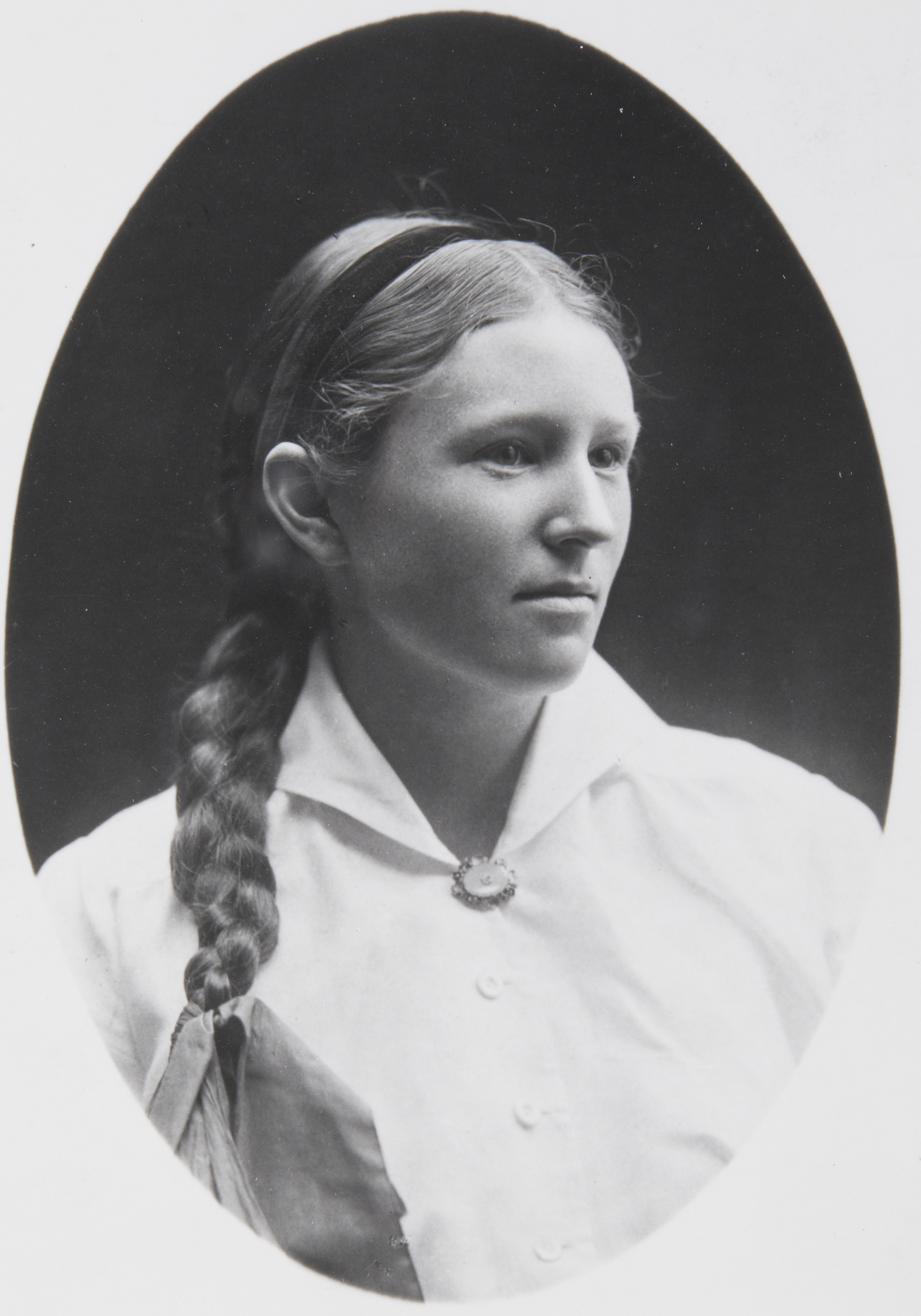
- Byles, c. 1924
- Born: 8 April 1900; Ashton upon Mersey, Cheshire, England
- Died: 21 November 1979 (aged 79); Cheltenham, New South Wales, Australia
- Education: Presbyterian Ladies' College, Sydney; Pymble Ladies' College
- Alma mater: University of Sydney (BA 1921, LLB 1924)
- Occupations: Solicitor and author
- Known for: First practising female solicitor in N.S.W, pacifist, mountaineer, explorer, feminist, author and conservationist

Marie Beuzeville Byles (8 April 1900 – 21 November 1979) was an Australian solicitor, conservationist, feminist, explorer and journalist who was the first practising female solicitor in New South Wales. She was an original member of the Buddhist Society in New South Wales. She was also a travel and non-fiction writer.

== Life ==
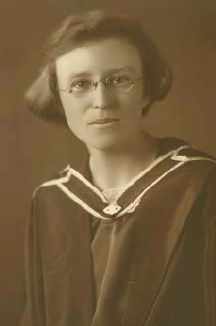
Marie Byles at graduation, University of Sydney, c. 1921

The eldest of three children, Byles was born in 1900 in Ashton upon Mersey in what was then Cheshire, England, to progressive-minded parents. Her younger brothers were David John Byles and Baldur Unwin Byles (1904–1975). Her parents were Unitarian Universalists, Fabian socialists and pacifists. Her mother Ida Margaret, née Unwin, was a suffragette and had studied at The Slade School of Fine Art, until "her artistic talents were lost to the drudgery of housekeeping", and who impressed upon her daughter the necessity of being financially independent of men. Her father, Cyril Beuzeville Byles, was a railway signal engineer. In England he involved his children in campaigns against fences that prevented public access for recreational walks.

The family moved to Australia in 1911 because Cyril Byles was appointed Chief Signals Engineer with the New South Wales Government Railways, to design the signal system for electrifying the railway system. They found a block of land in Beecroft and in 1913 built a house there which they named 'Chilworth'. The family spent summers by the sea, and in 1913 they also built a small cottage at Palm Beach, on Sunrise Hill facing the lighthouse.

Byles was educated at Beecroft Primary School, and at the Presbyterian Ladies' College, Sydney, at Croydon from 1914 to 1915, and in 1916 and 1917 at the new second campus of the school at Pymble (now known as Pymble Ladies' College). She excelled, and became a prefect and dux of the school in 1916, and Head Prefect and dux the following year. At matriculation, she won an Exhibition to the University of Sydney.

Byles never married, had no children, and considered it a waste of potential when her friend Dot Butler chose to have children rather than continue with full-time mountaineering.

In 1932 she joined The Women's Club, which was created in Sydney in 1901 to provide a place where women "interested in public, professional, scientific and artistic work" could meet.

Byles was raised as a strict vegetarian by her mother, and in 1957 commented that she had never eaten meat.

== First female solicitor ==
Byles was one of a small number of women to attend the University of Sydney. She graduated with a Bachelor of Arts in 1921 and in 1924 she completed a Bachelor of Laws degree and became the first woman to be admitted as a solicitor in New South Wales. Although Ada Evans had graduated in law in 1902, it had been illegal for a woman to practise law in Australia until 1918. After clerking for four years, in 1929 Byles set up a legal practice, the first woman to do so in New South Wales.

Byles operated two law practices – one in Eastwood and the other in the central Sydney. She gave young women opportunities to participate in the profession. 'The business in Eastwood built up because she had the reputation of getting things done so quickly and that was almost unknown in a legal office, she was notorious.' (Employee, Ruth Milton). She worked mainly on conveyancing and probate, and also to ensure just divorce settlements for female clients. She retired and handed over the legal practice to a partner in 1970.

== Journalist and speaker ==
As a student, Byles wrote and published articles on legal, political, and environmental subjects. From 1927 to 1936 she had the position of legal correspondent for the Australian Women's Mirror. She wrote articles against women changing their name on marriage, so as to protect their financial assets. As legal correspondent she brought attention to laws and court practices that discriminated against women. She gave lectures for the Australian League of Nations Union and wrote pamphlets for The United Associations of Women.

== Conservationist and bushwalker ==
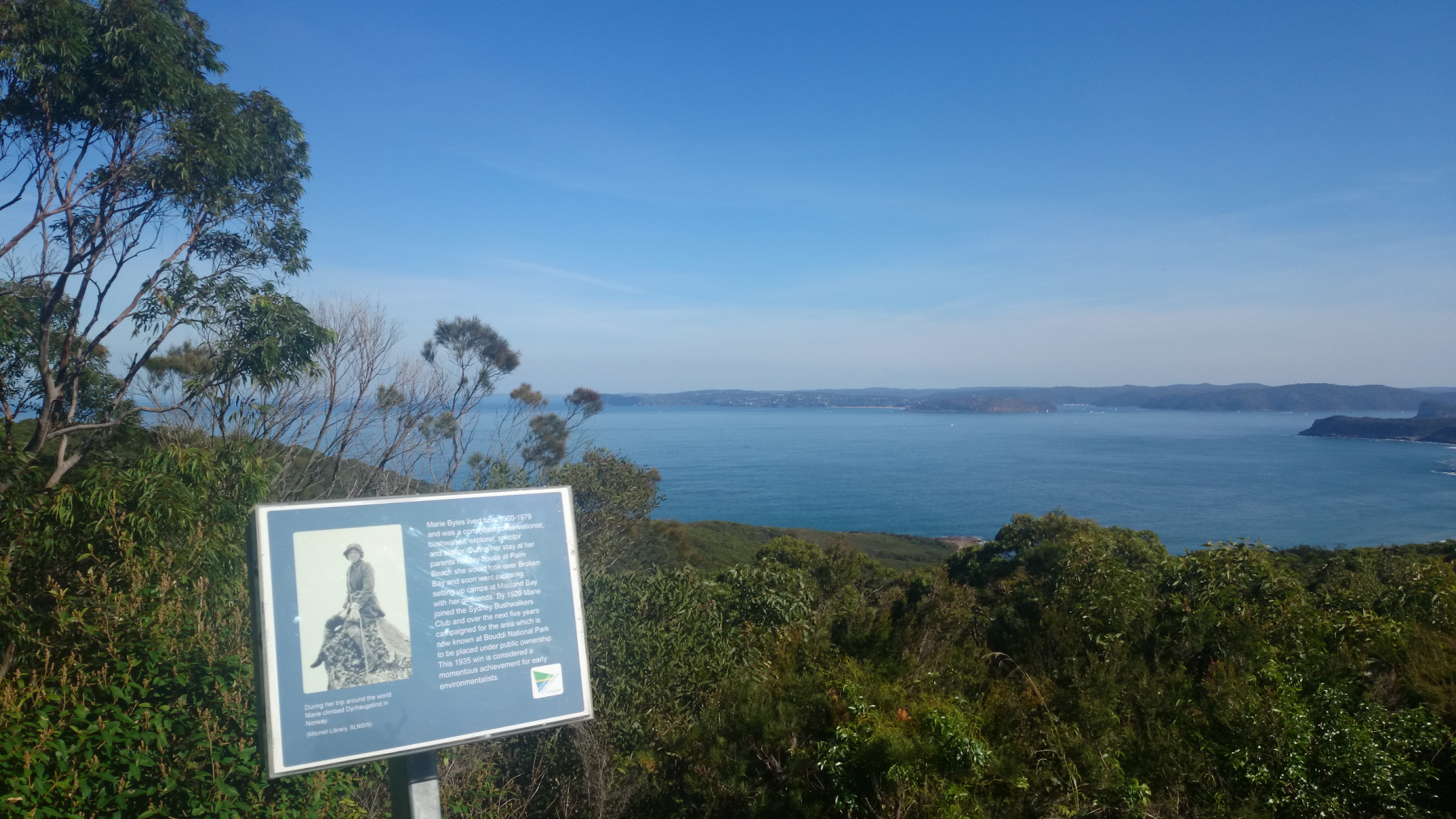
The Marie Byles lookout

As a teenager at her family's holiday retreat at Palm Beach, Byles would look through her telescope across Broken Bay to the bushland beyond on the Central Coast. The area was marked on maps as Bouddi, an aboriginal name meaning nose. It was a coal reserve visited only by fishermen. In 1920 Byles and some of her university friends set out to walk through the bush of Bouddi to Maitland Bay, then known as 'Boat Harbour', where they camped. It became a favourite spot for them. The only bushwalking club at the time was the Mountain Trails Club led by Myles Dunphy, which did not admit women. By 1929, there was an increasing focus on organised recreation for the city and suburban population and Marie joined the two-year-old Sydney Bush Walkers Club. In 1930, a new name for Boat Harbour was proposed by the club; bushwalker Dorothy Lawry suggested "Maitland Bay" after the steamer that was wrecked at the northern end of the beach in 1889.

Over the next five years, with the support of the Federation of Sydney Bushwalkers Clubs, Byles successfully campaigned in the press for the area to be placed under public ownership. The creation of Bouddi Natural Park in 1935 was a landmark achievement for the early conservationists. The Lands Department set aside an even larger area than Byles had proposed. Byles was elected a trustee of the board that managed the park, and for many years organised volunteers to clear and maintain its walking tracks. A lookout over Bouddi has been named after her; it is accessible by car, on The Scenic Road in Killcare Heights just south of the Bouddi National Park Visitor Centre.

In 1939, Byles was the co-founder, with her close friend Paddy Pallin, of The Bush Club. This was a bushwalking club with an emphasis on day-walks, which did not impose rigorous entry tests on prospective members and attracted many pre-war European refugees as members.

== Explorer ==
In 1927–28, Byles had saved enough money from working for four years as a law clerk to take a year off to travel. She set off on a Norwegian cargo boat, and it is from this journey that she wrote her popular book By Cargo Boat and Mountain, published in 1931. Later she was periodically able to leave her law practice in the hands of partners, to climb mountains in Britain, Norway and Canada. In 1935 she climbed Mt Cook in New Zealand. After finding that an expedition to Alaska would be too expensive, in 1938 she led a large expedition to Mt Sansato, in Western China near the Tibetan border. At times her party of six in China, which included Dora de Beer, Mick Bowie and Marjorie Edgar-Jones, traveled with a military escort to protect them from bandits. Due to poor weather, the expedition failed to reach the summit, and Byles was bitterly disappointed.

== Meditation ==
Byles became interested in the Quaker denomination of Christianity, but was refused membership. During her travels through Burma, China and Vietnam in 1938, Byles often chose to stay in temples, which brought her into direct contact with non-European cultures and religions. On her return, she renewed her interest in the teachings of Gandhi, and began exploring Buddhism. A collapsed foot arch meant that she was no longer able to walk long distances or climb, and she studied spirituality and meditation to find ways of dealing with her pain.

Over the following years Byles spent a year in India, including the Himalayas, and made three trips to Burma and two trips to Japan. In 1960 she formed a meditation group, inviting interested people from any religion or none to meet on Saturday afternoons to study meditation techniques. In later life she became particularly drawn to Mahayana Buddhism and the conscious practice of kindness and compassion. From these experiences she completed four books on Buddhism.

== Byles' home ==
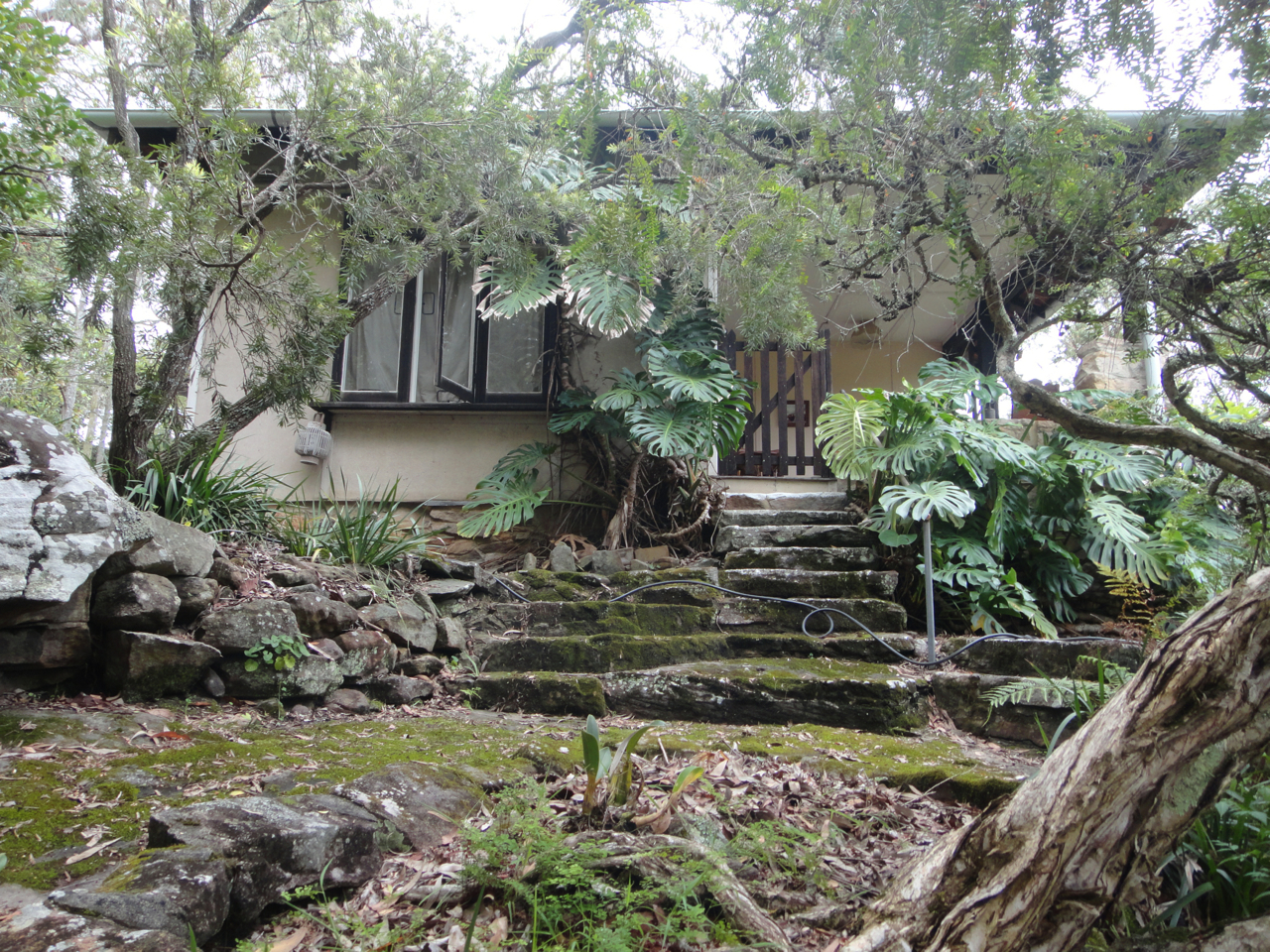
'Ahimsa', the house that Byles built on the edge of Cheltenham, as it looked in 2015

By 1938 Byles left her family home in Beecroft and built her own house on bushland that she had bought in 1935 at the edge of nearby Cheltenham, adjacent to crown land. She named it 'Ahimsa' after the term used by Gandhi meaning "harmlessness". The four-room simple cottage is built of fibro and sandstone, and the large north-facing verandah is primarily where Byles slept and lived in preference to the interior rooms. In addition to the house, she wanted to have a place on her land for groups to meet for discussions and meditation. By 1949, the 'Hut of Happy Omen' was complete, designed as an open sleepout with bunks and a large sandstone fireplace. She had another small house built next to 'Ahimsa' in 1975, called 'Sentosa' (a Malay language word meaning peace and tranquility).

In 1970 Byles bequeathed her property to The National Trust of Australia (NSW), which she had helped in 1946 when she was the consulting solicitor who drafted the organisation's constitution.

== Death and legacy ==
Byles died at 'Ahimsa' in 1979. In 1985 a dramatised documentary, A Singular Woman, was made by Gillian Coote using text from an unpublished autobiography written by Byles, along with reenactments and commentary by friends. Her papers (1923–1982) are held in the State Library of New South Wales.

Byles Creek near her home is named in her honour, as are Byles Place, in the Canberra suburb of Chisholm, and the Marie Byles Lookout in Killcare Heights, N.S.W.

== Works ==
- By Cargo Boat and Mountain (1931)
- Footprints of Gautama the Buddha (1957)
- Journey into Burmese Silence (1962)
- The Lotus and the Spinning Wheel (1963)
- Paths to Inner Calm (1965)
- A New Road to Ancient Truth, by Tenko Nishida and Ittoen Tenko-San, translated by Makoto Ohashi (introduction only, 1971)
- Stand Straight without Strain (1978) about the Alexander technique
- Many Lives in One, unpublished autobiography

Source: Marie Byles in libraries (WorldCat catalog)

== See also ==
- Dymphna Cusack, a lifelong friend after they met at Sydney University
- First women lawyers around the world
