= The Bush Club =

Australian bushwalking club

The Bush Club is an Australian bushwalking club founded in 1939 in Sydney, New South Wales, Australia.

== History ==
The club was founded by Marie Byles and Paddy Pallin in 1939. The club differed from others because it did not organise walks that took more than a day. These walks which did not involve overnight camping meant that recently-arrived European refugees could join in, even though some of them were required to report to the authorities each day.

== See also ==
- Sydney Bush Walkers Club
- Caloola Club

== Sources ==
- Slattery, Deirdre (15–18 April 2009). "Bushwalking and access: Byles, Dunphy and the Kosciusko Primitive Area debate 1943-6" (PDF). La Trobe University - Fourth International Outdoor Education Research Conference. pp. 5, 6.
