= Palin =

The surname Palin is a name of British origin, either English or Welsh. Possible derivations include an anglicization of the Welsh patronymic ap Heilyn ("son of Heilyn") or a reference to the English placenames Poling, West Sussex or Sea Palling, Norfolk. Independently of this, Palin also is a Swedish language surname that occurs in Sweden and Finland.

People with this name include:

- Arthur Thomas Palin (1916–2006), British chemist and bacteriologist
- Brett Palin (born 1984), Canadian hockey player
- Christian Palin (born 1978), Finnish-Uruguayan singer
- Eduard Palin (1891–1969), Finnish diplomat
- Harold Palin (1916–1990), British rugby league footballer
- John Palin (politician) (1870–1934), British politician
- John Palin (sport shooter) (born 1934), British former sports shooter
- Leigh Palin (born 1965), English footballer
- Leo Palin (born 1956), Finnish tennis player
- Michael Palin (born 1943), British actor, comedian (member of Monty Python) and writer
- Philip Palin (1864–1937), British Indian Army officer
- Robert Palin (1835–1861), Australian criminal
- Roger Palin (born 1938), former Royal Air Force commander
- Sarah Palin (born 1964), former governor of Alaska and 2008 U.S. Republican vice-presidential nominee
  - Todd Palin (born 1964), American snowmobile racer and former husband of Sarah Palin
  - Bristol Palin (born 1990), daughter of Todd and Sarah Palin
- Sep Palin (1878–1952), American harness racing driver
- Tom Palin (born 1974), English painter, writer and educator
- William Palin (1893–1967), Anglican archdeacon

== See also ==
- Palín (disambiguation)
- Palin (throne)
- Palin, Arunachal Pradesh, a town in the Kurung Kumey district in north east India
- Palin Report 1920, an inquiry examining the rioting in Jerusalem in April 1920
- Paling
- Pallin
