= Allen Axel Strom =

Australian teacher and conservationist

Allen Axel Strom (c. 1914 – 23 March 1997) was an Australian teacher and conservationist. He was an exponent of environmental education and was instrumental in the development of the national park and nature reserve system in New South Wales in the 1950s and 1960s.

== Life ==
During the 1940s and 1950s Strom was a teacher at the Enmore Activity School and the Broken Bay National Fitness Camp. He lectured for 11 years at Balmain Teachers College and founded the Caloola Club. In 1948 he became a member of the NSW Fauna Protection Panel, the forerunner of the National Parks and Wildlife Service, then in 1958 was appointed Chief Guardian of Fauna, working to expand the number of nature reserves and national parks in the state. He retired from the education department in 1971 but held executive positions in the Association of Environmental Education and other conservation organisations.

After Strom's death in 1997, Allan Fox, another leading Australian conservationist, embarked on writing a Strom biography. However, Fox had only completed draft chapters of the biography when he died in 2013. In 2016, a group of 'Strom followers' located electronic versions of the drafts and prepared them as an e-book for public distribution. The book is titled Chief Guardian: The Life and Times of Allen Strom.

The Strom followers also located a hard copy manuscript of a book Allen Strom wrote in 1980 about nature conservation in New South Wales in the 1950s and 1960s, particularly his experiences as a Fauna Protection Panel member and as Chief Guardian of Fauna. The group of followers digitally transferred the manuscript into an e-book.

== Honours and awards ==
- Honorary Life Member, NSW National Parks Association (1963)
- Australian Natural History Medallion (1972)
- Member of the Order of Australia (AM) (1977) for services to conservation education
- Environmental Educator of the Year (1981)
