= Dot Butler =

Australian bushwalker, mountaineer, and conservationist

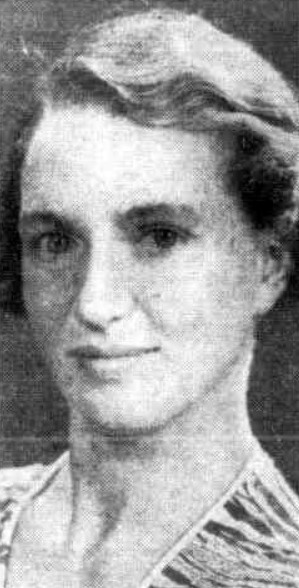
- Butler in 1936
- Born: 12 September 1911; Ashfield
- Died: 21 February 2008
- Occupation: Bushwalker

Dorothy Butler (née English; 12 September 1911 – 21 February 2008) —better known as Dot Butler—was an Australian bushwalker, mountaineer and conservationist.

== Early life ==
Dorothy English was born in Sydney, in the district of Ashfield, to parents Frank and Isadora English, in 1911. One of five children, she was an active child later recalling that "all our childhood entertainment was climbing – brick kilns, chimneys, telegraph poles – anything off the horizontal, and always barefoot of course". She recounted that the "prize" climb, for the English children, was the giant crane used to lift locomotives at the Chullora railway yards. Butler was a vegetarian in her youth but later admitted that she preferred to eat stuffed-grouse.

English was a bright student at Sydney Girls High School from 1922 to 1926, where she also excelled at sport. In 1927, she attended Stott and Hoare's Business College, and joined Bondi Icebergs, a winter swimming club, and Bondi Beach Acrobatic Team.

With money earned in her first job as a stenographer, English, who never saw being a woman as an obstacle to any undertaking, cycled around Tasmania, on her own, barefoot and wearing shorts. Later, in 1937, her solo cycling holiday in Tasmania was reported in The Daily Telegraph, under the heading "How to Holiday with No Money". The newspaper article told how she had gone to Tasmania and "saw 400 miles of its scenery for £5/12/- " including "£5/10/- on steamer fares". It described English as a "cyclist, a vegetarian, and a frugal person", who had smuggled her bicycle onto the ship as passengers' luggage. English told the reporter how, as a young woman travelling alone, she would often camp in cemeteries, so as not to attract unwelcome attention, and how she had fed herself cheaply during the trip.

English celebrated her 21st birthday by cycling to Kosciuszko, doing some skiing while there.

== Pre-war bushwalking and climbing ==
Bushwalking became a popular pastime in the 1930s, as the Great Depression in Australia led people to seek enjoyable recreation at low cost. In 1931, English joined the Sydney Bush Walkers Club (SBW), with which she would have a lifelong association. In 1966, describing her introduction to bushwalking, she said "It was like fitting a hand into a glove. Bushwalking and I were made for each other."

Another early female member of SBW was Marie Byles, who—although a decade older than Dot—became a lifelong friend of English.

English achieved fame among bushwalkers as the "barefoot walker"—she rarely wore boots or any other footwear when walking—and as one of the legendary "Tiger" bushwalkers. The Tigers were an informal grouping within SBW, renowned for covering long distances over rugged and often uncharted terrain, at a very rapid pace. They were very fit—even athletic—walkers, who carried only the lightest of equipment. Dot was one of only two female Tiger walkers.

Once, English and fellow Tiger, Max Gentle—starting around lunchtime on a Saturday—caught a train to Blackheath in the Blue Mountains and had descended to the Blue Gum Forest in the Grose Valley by mid-afternoon. After camping overnight, by following the Grose River, they reached Richmond by the end of Sunday, covering 50 miles (80 kilometres) in a day and a half, through tough terrain. As usual, English made the walk in bare feet.

English founded and edited the Sydney Bush Walkers Magazine, also contributing many articles to it.

English studied physiotherapy at Sydney University from 1933 to 1935, while bushwalking at every opportunity. While at university, she was introduced to rock climbing by her friend Marie Byles, herself—among her many accomplishments—an accomplished mountaineer. English later recalled that "Marie lent me mountaineering books which fired my imagination—the reconnaissance of Everest by Shipton and Tilman, polar exploration, both Arctic and Antarctic, adventuring in Greenland and Iceland. It excited me enormously."

In 1936, English and Dr Eric Dark were the first to climb Crater Bluff in the Warrumbungles, which was then known by its older name of Split Rock. English climbed in bare feet and, although the pair used ropes, they did not use pitons or rock bolts. The pair were part of a larger expedition, including Marie Byles and another experienced alpine climber, "Pan" Paszek, but, although Dot had never before climbed using ropes, she was chosen for the difficult climb. English and Eric Dark agreed that, due to her agility, Dot would take the lead on vertical parts of the climb but the more-experienced Dark would take the lead on traverses.

English's climbing companions, Dr Eric Dark and Marie Byles—both amazed by her natural skill and agility in the Crater Bluff climb—suggested that SBW should set up a climbing section. English was happy to oblige, when Byles donated a brand new climbing rope to the club. The pre-war members of the climbing section of SBW largely consisted of Tiger walkers, including the leading Tiger, Gordon Smith, who led the club's—and English's—first climbing trip in New Zealand, over three-months in 1937. The group returned inspired to tackle challenging climbs.

English was, as were many bushwalkers of the time, an Honorary Ranger carrying a warrant card that allowed her to arrest individuals who were breaking early N.S.W. environmental protection laws such as the Wild Flowers and Native Plants Protection Act, 1927 and the Birds and Animals Protection Act, 1918. She held strong views on conservation and leaving the landscape in pristine condition.

While English was working as a secretary in the early 1930s, her boss Walter Trinick—the Sydney manager for the Melbourne newspaper, The Argus—had recognised that the law allowed any N.S.W. public service employee to be an Honorary Ranger. Working with Trinick, Dot established the Rangers’ League, by writing to the house journals of public service departments in N.S.W. and inviting public servants to join. The Rangers' League was soon an organisation of approximately 700 Honorary Rangers—550 men and 150 women.

Immensely fit, in 1938 English walked 40 miles (64 kilometers) in 10 hours, during a distance walking challenge in Centennial Park, then went to Faulconbridge, where she "slept on a bed of pine needles", before arising at dawn to go bushwalking in the Grose Valley. She used the publicity created by the walking challenge to advance the involvement of women in bushwalking, posing in a swimsuit for a newspaper article in the Daily Telegraph (Sydney) "to prove that strenuous exercise such as long-distance hiking does not result in muscles or masculinity". The same newspaper article revealed that English was also cycling and canoeing; she kept a canoe at Balmoral that she had, on occasion, taken through the Sydney Heads; while canoeing, she had a collision with the Mosman ferry, fortunately emerging unharmed.

From 1939, English spent three summers in New Zealand. Her work as a guide in the Mt Cook National Park was an important influence on her post-war activities. During this time, she met the young Edmund Hillary, and climbed the Remarkables, only donning boots for the portion of the climb in snow and ice. In 1940, she became a member of the New Zealand Alpine Club, being elected on her first attempt. In 1941, she climbed New Zealand's highest peak, 3,763 metre high Mount Cook.

== Marriage ==
In 1940, English met Ira Butler, a fellow bushwalker and Reserve Bank economist. In 1943, they married, after Dot cycled from Sydney to Melbourne to do so because she was unable to secure a seat on a train. Later, once again unable to obtain a seat on a wartime train, she cycled from Melbourne to Albury, while six months pregnant with her first child. Dot then spent some years raising the four children from her marriage, until returning to her adventures in the mid-1950s.

== Post-war adventures ==
By the mid-1950s, as her children grew, Dot Butler was able to become more active in the Sydney Bush Walkers again. In 1956, concerned about the number of Australian climbers who had alpine climbing accidents in New Zealand, she established an Australian section of the New Zealand Alpine Club. Prospective climbers could learn basic safety, before joining her to climb in New Zealand with experienced mountaineers. She organised the first such climbing trip to New Zealand around Christmas 1956, and she continued to join these trips for almost thirty years afterwards.

Ira Butler's work took them overseas and provided Dot with a chance to walk, climb and cycle in many countries. Accompanying Ira on a conference trip to Lyon, in 1964, Dot took time out to climb in the Alps. Because she had come without crampons, she confined her climbing to rock climbs, ascending the Aiguille du Grépon (informally known as "The Grepon"), via Mummary's Crack and the four pinnacles making up the mountain.

In the southern hemisphere late spring to early summer climbing season of 1965–1966, Butler went climbing on the Tasman Glacier. It is known that she did wear climbing boots for alpine climbing in ice and snow, but still preferred to go barefoot whenever possible.

Not one for rules, Butler made some clandestine climbs at night, over the arch of the Sydney Harbour Bridge, with a group known as "Night Climbers of Sydney".

In 1968, Butler took a crash course in Spanish and in 1969, organised an Australian expedition of nine climbers to the Andes. They made 27 different ascents (13 of these were first ascents) of 19 mountains in Peru's Cordillera Vilcabamba, mostly over 5,500 metres.

In 1969, Butler organised the purchase by SBW and others of a piece of land in the Kangaroo Valley, which became known as "Coolana" (said to mean "Happy Meeting Place"). The land was a nature reserve but also was used by the club for reunions and other events.

In June 1975, Butler and her daughter Rona were in a group that canoed the Yukon River from Whitehorse to Dawson City, a four-week trip of 640 kilometres.

== Work career ==
Butler worked as a stenographer after leaving school. For a time, she was the secretary of Walter Trinick, the pro-conservation Sydney manager of the Melbourne newspaper The Argus.

After qualifying as a physiotherapist, Butler worked as a nurse at the Collaroy annex of the Royal Alexandra Hospital for Children, rehabilitating children who had been affected by poliomyelitis. She was still working as a nurse in 1966.

== Later life ==
In later life, by her own admission, Butler's attitude to Australia changed, from seeing it as a land of empty spaces yet to be explored to seeing it as a land needing regeneration to repair the damage that had been done to it.

An avid conservationist, Butler worked with the Colong Foundation and campaigned, in particular, against the flooding of Lake Pedder and for the establishment of the Myall Lakes National Park. In the 1980s, she was involved in the campaign to save the last piece of lowland tropical rainforest inland from Cape Tribulation, which became a World Heritage Site in 1988.

In 1991, at age 80, Butler climbed and then abseiled down the Sydney Harbour Bridge, as part of Seniors' Week activities. Also in 1991, her autobiography "The barefoot bush walker" was published.

== Family ==
After initially living at Coogee, the Butlers found a large piece of land at 28-30 Boundary Road, Wahroonga—then still covered in native vegetation and near to Ku-ring-gai Chase National Park—and built a house there. This would remain the family home for many years.

Dot and Ira Butler had four children, daughters Rona and Wendy, and twin brothers Norman and Wade. All the children became active in the outdoors.

When a re-enactment of Butler's 1936 barefoot ascent of Crater Bluff was made, Rona played Dot and Wade played the part of Dr Eric Dark, Dot's climbing companion. Both Rona and Wade were accomplished climbers. Butler herself was there for the re-enactment, climbing with the camera crew.

Daughter Wendy, a medical student, drowned in an accident on the Kowmung River in November 1966. Dot wrote "With her death, laughter died in our house. She was another me."

Ira Butler became less interested in bushwalking but, by the 1960s, he had taken on the pastime of growing and breeding orchids. He died of a heart attack in 1972 at their home in Wahroonga. A year later, son Norman died, after being bitten by a Taipan near Nimbin. Butler's other son, Wade, was on a six-day solo expedition in the area around Precipitous Bluff, Tasmania, when he disappeared in November 1995.

== Death and legacy ==
In 2008, at the age of 96, Butler's very full life of adventure ended, at Franklin in Tasmania where her daughter Rona was living. She was surrounded by Rona and by her grandchildren. Her ashes were scattered in the Warrumbungle Ranges.

Butler had been a legend in her own lifetime, and an inspiration to many. Never afraid to break conventions or be seen as unusual, she was quoted as saying—with a laugh—that "Eccentricity is just being ahead of your time." Her personal motto—an apt one—was "Energy begets energy." She remains renowned within Australian bushwalking and conservation circles, especially in her home state of New South Wales.

As a climber, Butler is remembered as a part of the continuous tradition of Australian female mountaineers, beginning with Freda Du Faur, continuing with Marie Byles and then passing via Dot Butler to contemporary climbers. Her contribution to the training of Australian mountain climbers is a lasting legacy.

Butler is commemorated by these places that were named in her honour:

- Mt Dot, a 1,733-metre high mountain overlooking the Hollyford Valley in New Zealand
- Dot Butler Conservation Reserve, in Kangaroo Valley, New South Wales, a Crown Reserve of approximately 251 hectares, adjacent to Coolana
- Dots Creek, a 4.5 km long creek also located within the Kangaroo Valley
- Dot Butler Street, in the Canberra suburb of Wright
