= Palín =

Palín may refer to:

- Palin (game), a traditional game of the Mapuche people
- Palín, Escuintla, municipality in the Escuintla Department of Guatemala
- Palín, Michalovce District, village in the Michalovce District of Slovakia

== See also ==
- Palin (surname)
