= The Breadknife =

Volcanic dyke in New South Wales, Australia

Coordinates: 30°3′S 150°3′E

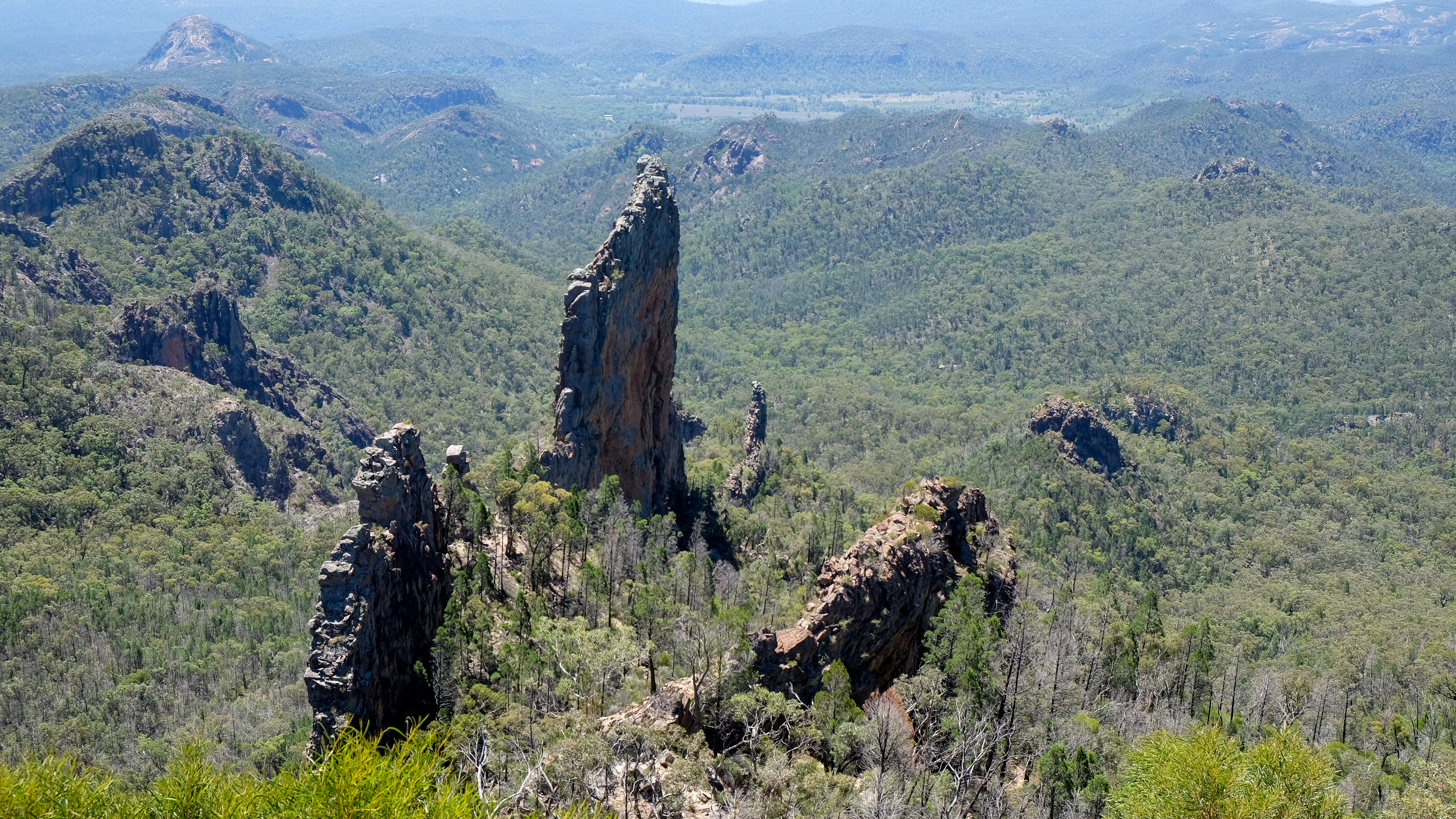
View of The Breadknife

The Breadknife is a volcanic dyke in New South Wales, Australia. It is nearly 90 metres high, but often is only 4 m wide, which is particularly rare. The Breadknife was part of a large shield volcano, that first erupted about 17 million years ago and stopped about 13 million years ago. It is composed of peralkaline trachyte.

Nearby volcanic remnants include the Belougery Spire, Belougery Split Rock, Crater Bluff, Bluff Mountain and Mount Exmouth. A network of walking tracks are used to access the steep mountains and ridges surrounding the dyke. The shortest walk completely around the Breadknife is hard and steep, taking roughly five hours to complete.

== Origin Story ==
A huge shield-shaped volcano formed as volcanic explosions occurred over millions of years. This shield volcano rose about 1,000 m and is now largely eroded, forming the Warrumbungles. The Breadknife was formed when hot magma spread through a soft rock. When the magma solidified and became harder than the soft rock, erosion exposed a dyke.

== In popular culture ==
Part of the video for singer David Bowie's 1983 single "Let's Dance", took place in sight of The Breadknife.

The village in the anime "Adventures of the Little Koala", took place within the shadow of The Breadknife.

== See also ==
- List of volcanoes in Australia
- Warrumbungle National Park
