= Adventures of the Little Koala =

Japanese animated television series

- Title screen

コアラボーイコッキィ (Koara Bōi Kokki)
- Anime television series
- Directed by: Takashi Tanazawa
- Produced by: Yoshihiro Osada (OSADA Co.); Daisaku Shirakawa (Hakuhodo); Toru Hara (Topcraft)
- Music by: Kunihiro Kawano
- Studio: Topcraft Limited Company
- Licensed by: Hakuhodo; CINAR Films; Viacom International
- Original network: MegaTON (Tokyo Channel 12)
- English network: AU: WIN Network; TV1; CA: CTV Television Network (1990–91); NZ: Channel 2; US: Nickelodeon (1987–88); Nick Jr. (1988–93)
- Original run: October 4, 1984 – March 28, 1985
- Episodes: 26 (52 segments)

Adventures of the Little Koala (known in Japan as Koala Boy Kockey (コアラボーイコッキィ, Koara Bōi Kokki)) is an anime television series produced by Hakuhodo. It aired originally in Japan on TV Tokyo from October 4, 1984, through March 28, 1985, and then aired in the United States on Nickelodeon (later moved into the Nick Jr. block upon its launch at the start of 1988) dubbed in English from June 1, 1987, until April 2, 1993. The storyline revolved around Roobear Koala (voiced in English by former child actor Steven Bednarski) and his friends and their utopian village in the Australian bush, known in the Japanese version as Yukari Village, within the shadow of a real rock formation known as The Breadknife.

Production of the English and French versions of the series was done by the Canadian studio CINAR Films.

It also aired in Australia, New Zealand, Canada, Greece, Italy, France, the United Kingdom, in the Arabic-speaking world, and other countries.

== Characters ==
Character	Voice actor	
Character	Canadian	Japanese
Roobear Koala / Koala Bear / Kockey / Kolby	Steven Bednarski	Toshiko Fujita
An eight-year-old koala and the series' protagonist. Smart, adventurous, inquisitive, and athletic, he enjoys surfing, skateboarding and baseball.
Laura Koala / Koala Bear / Lala	Morgan Hallett	Chisato Nakajima
Roobear's five-year-old sister. Although she is sometimes a bit spoiled, she is generally kind-hearted and is also a strong-willed girl.
"Mama" Koala / Vera / Miss / Mrs. / Ms. Koala / Koala Bear	Jane Woods	Yoshiko Asai
Roobear and Laura's mother. She is a devoted homemaker, wife and mother, and an excellent cook, but she has other talents as well: ten years prior to the events in the series, she won the village's airplane race, and proceeded to win a second time in the episode "Mommy Can Fly" (despite not being an official entrant in the race and only taking the cockpit in order to rescue other contestants who were stranded following a crash).
"Papa" Koala / Mel / Mr. Koala / Koala Bear	Walter Massey	Hachirou Ozuma
Roobear and Laura's father. He works as a photographer for Miss Lewis's magazine. His biggest vice is a tendency to overeat, leading his family to try to put him on a diet and exercise program (despite his protests) in the episode "Papa on Stilts".
Betty Koala / Koala Bear / Beth	Cleo Paskal	Yuriko Yamamoto
Roobear's girlfriend. She also can occasionally be somewhat vain, and her relationship with Roobear is sometimes colored by misunderstandings.
Horsey Kangaroo	Dean Hagopian	
The tallest of the Kangaroo Brothers.
Walter Kangaroo	A.J. Henderson	Naoki Tatsuta
Roobear's friend. The Ringleader of the Kangaroo Brothers, a self-described expert boomerang thrower. He and his brothers love nothing more than stirring up trouble in the village. Pamie and Mingle were the most frequent recipients of their teasing. Walter has an unrequited crush on Betty but (oddly given his character) was too shy to tell her how he felt.
Colt Kangaroo	Rob Roy	
The shortest of the Kangaroo Brothers.
Floppy Rabbit	Timothy Webber	Kyōko Tongū
Roobear's best friend. Floppy is a white rabbit who is a science enthusiast and budding inventor who also has a strong competitive streak when it comes to sports and other contests. He always wears a Walkman with his earphones.
Mimi Rabbit	Barbara Pogemiller	Mayumi Shou
Floppy's little sister.
Pamie Penguin	Bronwen Mantel	Noriko Tsukase
A four-year-old blue penguin who loves to eat (although she temporarily turned anorexic in the episode "Balloon Pamie" as a result of Walter's teasing about her big stomach, which resulted in her fainting). She also has an unrequited crush on Roobear and has ambitions of being a nurse one day. Pamie and her brother Nick always wore scarves, even in hot weather, and had three younger brothers who were triplets.
Nick Penguin	Ian Finlay	Yumiko Shibata
Pamie's twin brother. While he is generally more level-headed than his sister and also has a bit of a sarcastic streak, he often goes along with Pamie's antics even though he knows better. In the episode "Pamie Falls in Love" he concocted a plan to cancel Roobear's planned picnic date with Betty so that Pamie could have the date with Roobear instead, but the plan ended in disaster for all. He also wore a bobble hat in addition to his scarf.
Kiwi	Phillip Pretten	
A bespectacled kiwi bird who served and worked as Papa Koala and everyone else's assistant.
Miss Lewis	Bronwen Mantel	Fuyumi Shiraishi
A adult female koala who worked as editor-in-chief for the village magazine and was always on the hunt for stories that would interest her readers. She had a close relationship with Roo-bear and his friends, acting as a surrogate teacher of sorts, and encouraged them when they decided to start their own children's newspaper.
Maki-Maki	Richard Dumont	
A frilled lizard who served and worked as Miss Lewis's assistant, school assistant, other work assistants and would often act as a town-crier: loudly trumpeting whatever breaking-news he'd discover, usually before checking its accuracy, and thus often being completely wrong. He's also a scaredy-cat as well.
Weather	Richard Dumont and Vlasta Vrána	Kaneto Shiozawa
An enigmatic dingo who was always shrouded with a heavy coat, scarf and hat, even in hot weather, and could forecast the weather with great accuracy. Like Miss Lewis, he had a close relationship with Roo-bear and his friends and acted as a sort of mentor and counselor for them.
Mingle	Barbara Pogemiller	
A meek, sensitive sugar glider and Weather's constant companion, who was often involved in the children's adventures; particularly when his airborne/gliding capabilities could come in handy, such as when the children were learning how to fly hang-gliders.
Duckbill Platypus	Arthur Grosser	Isamu Tanonaka
A platypus who enjoys collecting old junk and fashioning useful things out of it. The children call him "Bill" for short.
Mr. Mayor	A.J. Henderson	
As his name suggests, he is the mayor of the village. He is an elderly koala that wears a dark-brown shirt, pants and hat, plus light-brown shoes, an orange bowtie and has a mustache.
Dr. Nose	Walter Massey	
A friend of Papa Koala/Mel/Mr. Koala and someone else's school teacher, scientist, and botanist. He is a koala who wears glasses, a white shirt, a green jacket, black-pants, brown shoes and hat. He also has a beard and mustache.
Mr. Curator	Michael Rudder	
Another adult koala who sometimes works as a teacher at most times but sells antique stuff in his museum.
Diana	Sonja Ball	
A five-year-old little girl rabbit visiting her grandfather who Floppy and Roobear develop a crush on and believe to be the goddess of the moon. She appears in the episode "The Moon Goddess".
Dr. Flight	A.J. Henderson	
A koala who works as a doctor to make sure others get better and well. He does not work as a teacher as much as Miss Lewis and Mr. Curator.

== Historical background ==
Adventures of the Little Koala was made as Japan was in the midst of a koala craze along with another koala themed anime titled ふしぎなコアラ ブリンキー (The Wondrous Koala Blinky), which would later be broadcast alongside Little Koala on Nickelodeon's Nick Jr. block in 1988, as Noozles. According to The Anime Encyclopedia by Jonathan Clements and Helen McCarthy, Japan's koala craze was sparked by Tama Zoo in western Tokyo receiving their first koala from the Australian government, who sent six koalas to Japan as a token of goodwill, but in reality, Tama Zoo as well as other zoos in Japan got their koalas because Japan was craving them, and Little Koala and Noozles had already been airing when the koalas arrived in October 1984.

== Production notes ==
The Japanese animation studio Topcraft, best known for providing animation duties on many of Rankin-Bass' American animated TV specials as well as the feature film The Last Unicorn, worked on Adventures of the Little Koala. Topcraft provided animation assistance for Hayao Miyazaki's 1984 feature film Nausicaä of the Valley of the Wind; in fact, some of the animators who worked on Little Koala also worked on Nausicaa. After Nausicaa, a number of Topcraft animators went on to work for Miyazaki's Studio Ghibli.

Some notable animators who worked on this series included Katsuhisa Yamada and Hidekazu Ohara.

The opening and ending theme songs of the original Japanese version were recorded by the all-female rock band Akasaka Komachi, which would later gain fame as Princess Princess. The English language version of the theme song (used in both opening and closing credits) were recorded by a female trio led by Sonja Ball, Shari Chaskin and Maxie Vaughann, and was also used on several foreign VHS releases in both North America and Europe.

The series has a total of 26 episodes, each of them contained two 11-minute segments.

== Episode list ==
1. "The Old Clock Tower" / "Mingle Takes A Dive"
2. "Is Weather A Frog?" / "Lost in a Race"
3. "Ghost Ship" / "Balloon Pamie"
4. "The King of the Castle" / "Hang-Gliding With Roobear"
5. "The Mysterious Moa Bird" / "Love That Baby Moa!"
6. "Snow White and the Seven Koalas" / "Roobear's Invention"
7. "Papa on Stilts" / "Detective Roobear"
8. "The Dinosaur Egg" / "Treasure Hunt"
9. "Pamie Falls in Love" / "The Koala Butterfly"
10. "The Koala Bear Gang" / "Back To Nature"
11. "Roobear Saves the Day" / "Editor-In-Chief Roobear"
12. "Monster Scoop" / "The Biggest Jigsaw Puzzle in the World"
13. "Who Will Be the Flower Queen?" / "Circus Day"
14. "Roobear the Babysitter" / "Papa Makes a Pie"
15. "The Amazing Boomerang" / "The Runaway Hat"
16. "Conquering Mt. Breadknife" / "Save the Eucalyptus"
17. "Mommy Can Fly" / "The Secret of the McGillicuddy Vase"
18. "Heavenly Fireworks" / "Save That Junk"
19. "The Winner" / "A Hundred-Year-Old Camera"
20. "Nurse Pamie" / "Any Mail Today?"
21. "The Writing on the Wall" / "A Ride in a Spaceship"
22. "Is Mingle a Nuisance?" / "Allowance Problems"
23. "A Whale of a Ride" / "Laura Finds An Egg"
24. "A Broken Umbrella" / "Save The Butterflies"
25. "The Moon Goddess" / "The Flying Doctor"
26. "Eucalyptus Rocket" / "Penguins Don't Fly"

== Home media release ==
In 1989, Family Home Entertainment released four English-dubbed episodes on a VHS cassette entitled The Adventures of the Little Koala and Friends: Laura and the Mystery Egg, with the episodes "Laura Finds an Egg", "Conquering Mt. Breadknife", "Save the Eucalyptus", and "Mommy Can Fly".

== See also ==
- Blinky Bill
- Noozles
