= Trachyte =

Extrusive igneous rock

- Igneous rock
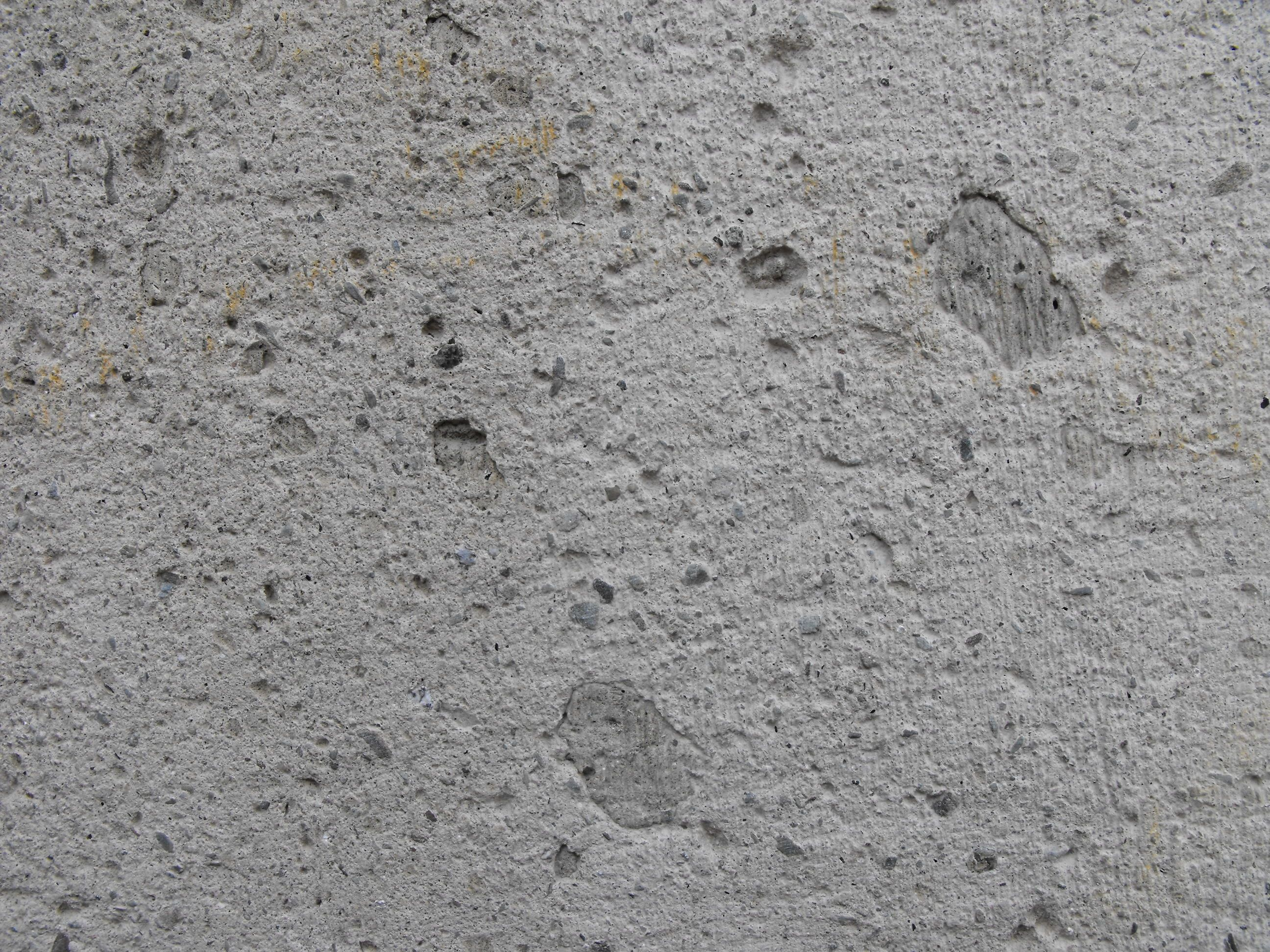
- A cut sample of trachyte, with phenocrysts of sanidine, in a wall in Germany

Composition
- Classification: Felsic
- Primary: Alkali feldspar, Plagioclase
- Secondary: quartz (<5%), or feldspathoids
- Texture: Aphanitic
- Equivalents: Intrusive variant is syenite

Trachyte (/ˈtreɪkaɪt, ˈtræk-/) is an extrusive igneous rock composed mostly of alkali feldspar. It is usually light-colored and aphanitic (fine-grained), with minor amounts of mafic minerals, and is formed by the rapid cooling of lava (or shallow intrusions) enriched with silica and alkali metals. It is the volcanic equivalent of syenite.

Trachyte is common wherever alkali magma is erupted, including in late stages of ocean island volcanism and in continental rift valleys, above mantle plumes, and in areas of back-arc extension. Trachyte has also been found in Gale crater on Mars.

Trachyte has been used as decorative building stone and was extensively used as dimension stone in the Roman Empire and the Republic of Venice.

== Chemical composition ==
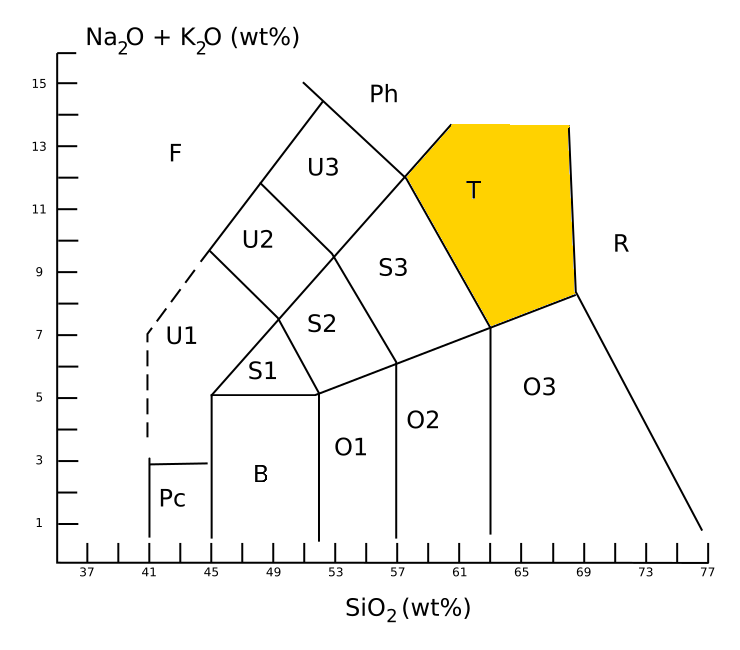
TAS diagram with trachyte field highlighted

Trachyte has a silica content of 60 to 65% and an alkali oxide content of over 7%. This gives it less SiO_{2} than rhyolite and more (Na_{2}O plus K_{2}O) than dacite. These chemical differences are consistent with the position of trachyte in the TAS classification, and they account for the feldspar-rich mineralogy of the rock type. Trachydacite occupies the same field in the TAS diagram as trachyte, but is distinguished from trachyte by a normative quartz content over 20%. Trachydacite is not a recognized rock type in the QAPF classification, where rocks rich in alkali feldspar and with quartz over 20% would be classified as rhyolites.

== Mineralogy ==
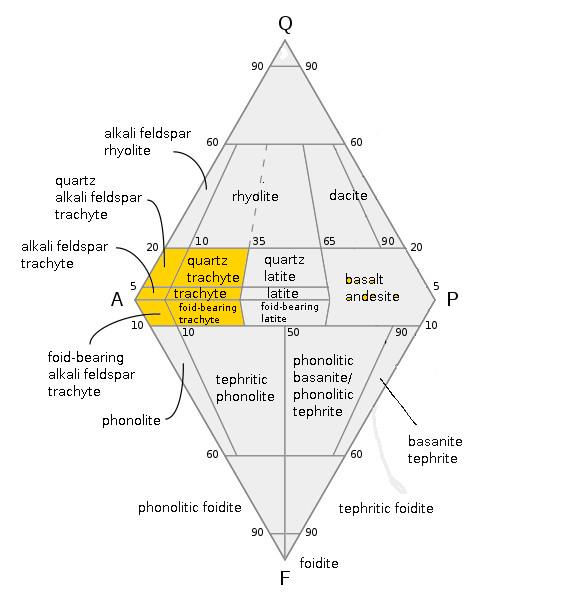
QAPF diagram with trachyte fields highlighted

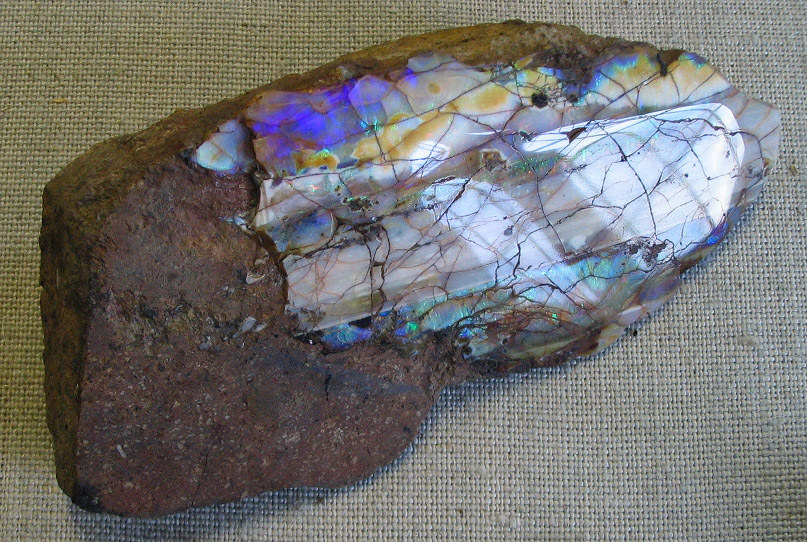
Polished opal on trachyte

The mineral assemblage of trachytes consists of essential alkali feldspar. Relatively minor plagioclase and quartz or a feldspathoid such as nepheline may also be present. This is reflected in the position of the trachyte fields in the QAPF diagram. Biotite, clinopyroxene and olivine are common accessory minerals. The plagioclase is typically sodium-rich oligoclase. The alkali feldspar is typically also sodium-rich sanidine (anorthoclase) and is often cryptoperthitic, with alternating microscopic bands of sodium feldspar (albite) and potassium feldspar (sanidine).

Trachytes are typically fine-grained and light-colored, but can be black if they consist mostly of glass. They are often porphyritic, with large well-shaped crystals of sanidine in a groundmass containing much smaller imperfect sanidine laths. Rhomb porphyry is an example with usually large porphyritic rhomb shaped phenocrysts embedded in a very fine-grained matrix. Some of the best known trachytes, such as the trachyte of Drachenfels on the Rhine, show striking porphyritic character, having large sanidine crystals of tabular form an inch or two in length scattered through their fine-grained groundmass. In many trachytes, however, the phenocrysts are few and small, and the groundmass comparatively coarse. The ferromagnesian minerals rarely occur in large crystals, and are usually not conspicuous in hand-sized specimens of these rocks. Two types of groundmass are generally recognized: the trachytic, composed mainly of long, narrow, subparallel rods of sanidine, and the orthophyric, consisting of small squarish or rectangular prisms of the same mineral. Sometimes granular augite or spongy riebeckite occurs in the groundmass, but as a rule this part of the rock is highly feldspathic.

Trachytes very often have minute irregular vesicles which make the broken surfaces of specimens of these rocks rough and irregular, and it is from this distinctive texture that they received their name. It was first given to rocks of this class from Auvergne, and was long used in a much wider sense than that defined above, so that it included quartz-trachytes (now known as liparites and rhyolites) and oligoclase-trachytes, which are now classified as andesites.

Quartz is rare in trachyte, but tridymite (which likewise consists of silica) is not uncommon. It is rarely in crystals large enough to be visible without the aid of the microscope, but in thin sections it may appear as small hexagonal plates, which overlap and form dense aggregates, like a mosaic or like the tiles on a roof. They often cover the surfaces of the larger feldspars or line the vesicles of the rock, where they may be mingled with amorphous opal or fibrous chalcedony. In the older trachytes, secondary quartz from the recrystallization of tridymite is not rare.

Of the mafic minerals present, augite is the most common. It is usually of pale green color, and its small crystals are often very perfect in form. Brown hornblende and biotite occur also, and are usually surrounded by black corrosion borders composed of magnetite and pyroxene; sometimes the replacement is complete and no hornblende or biotite is left, though the outlines of the cluster of magnetite and augite may clearly indicate from which of these minerals it was derived. Olivine is unusual, though found in some trachytes, for example those of the Arso in Ischia. Basic varieties of plagioclase, such as labradorite, are known also as phenocrysts in some Italian trachytes. Dark brown varieties of augite and rhombic pyroxene (hypersthene or bronzite) have been observed but are not common. Apatite, zircon and magnetite are practically always present as accessory minerals.

Occasionally minerals of the feldspathoid group, such as nepheline, sodalite and leucite, are present in trachytes, and rocks of this kind are known as foid-bearing trachytes. The sodium-bearing amphiboles and pyroxenes so characteristic of the phonolites may also be found in some trachytes; thus aegirine or aegirine augite forms outgrowths on diopside crystals, and riebeckite may be present in spongy growths among the feldspars of the groundmass (as in the trachyte of Berkum on the Rhine). Glassy forms of trachyte (obsidian) occur, as in Iceland, and pumiceous varieties are known (in Tenerife and elsewhere), but these rocks as contrasted with the rhyolites have a remarkably strong tendency to crystallize, and are rarely to any considerable extent vitreous.

== Geographic distribution ==
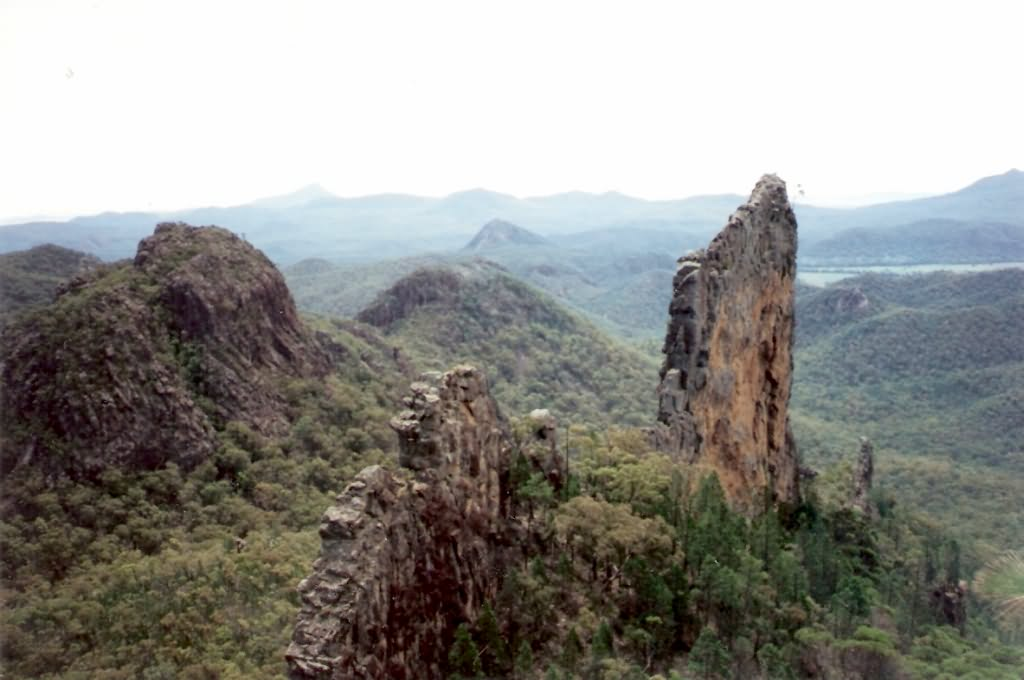
The Breadknife is a peralkaline trachyte dike in the Warrumbungles of eastern Australia.

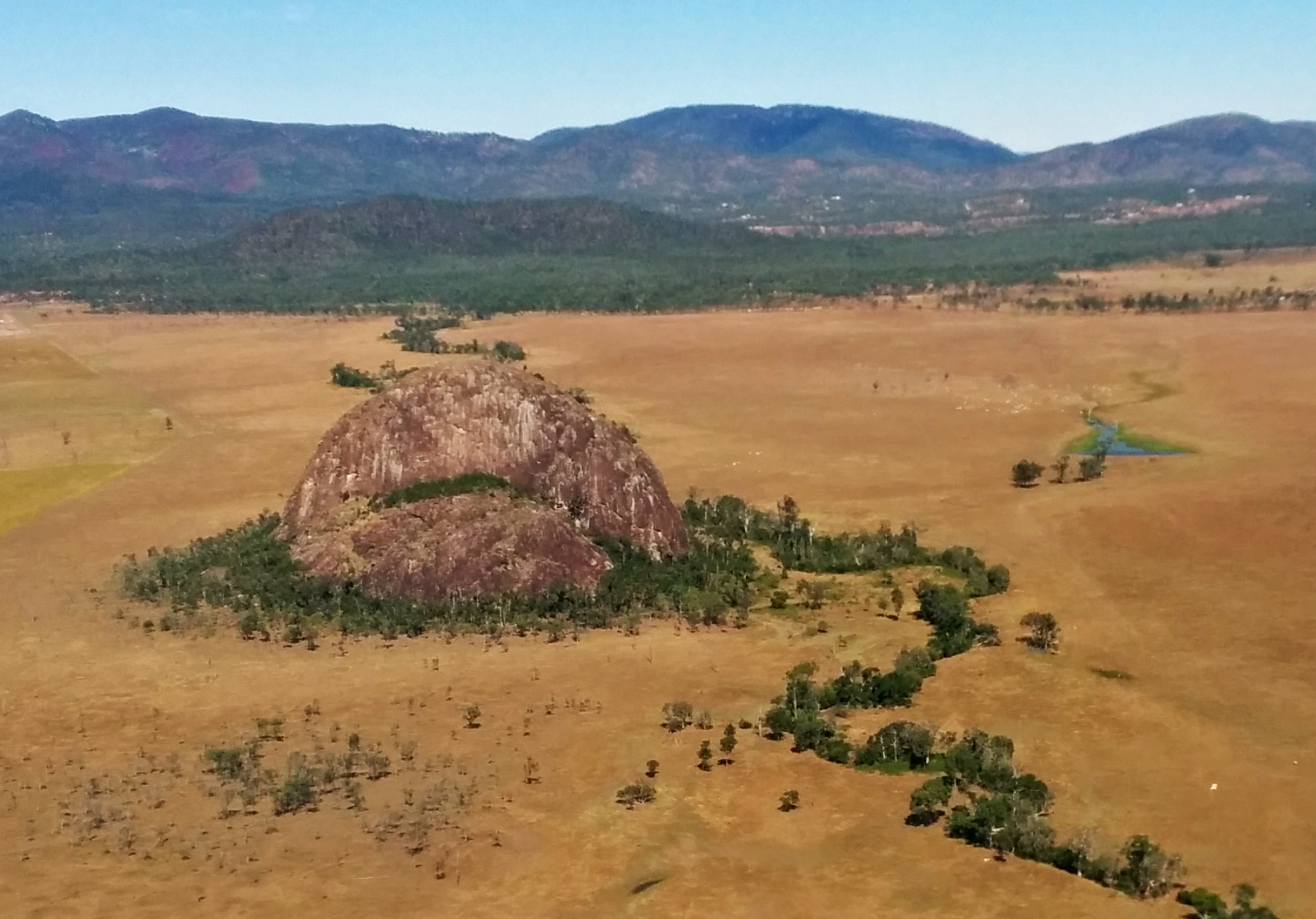
Iron Pot is one of several trachyte plugs in the Hedlow Creek region west of Yeppoon in Central Queensland.

Trachyte is the usual silica-rich end member of the alkaline magma series, in which alkaline basaltic magma experiences fractional crystallization while still underground. This process removes calcium, magnesium, and iron from the magma to give it a composition close to that of alkali feldspar. As a result, trachyte is common wherever alkali magma is erupted, including late eruptions of ocean islands and in continental rift valleys and mantle plumes. Only rarely does magmatic differentiation proceed beyond trachyte to phonolite or even more evolved alkaline magmas. Trachyte also occurs in areas of back-arc extension, such as the northern Aegean Sea and the Aeolian arc of Italy. The Aeolian back-arc includes the Campi Flegrei volcanic field, where trachytes have been erupted.

Trachytes are well represented among the Cenozoic volcanic rocks of Europe. In Britain they occur in Skye as lava flows and as dikes or intrusions, but they are much more common on the continent of Europe, as in the Rhine district and the Eifel, also in Auvergne, Bohemia and the Euganean Hills. In the neighborhood of Rome, Naples and the island of Ischia trachytic lavas and tuffs are of common occurrence. Trachytes are also found on the island of Pantelleria. In the United States, trachytes crop out extensively in the Davis Mountains, Chisos Mountains, and Big Bend Ranch State Park in the Big Bend (Texas) region, as well as southern Nevada and South Dakota (Black Hills). There is one known voluminous flow from Puʻu Waʻawaʻa on the north flank of Hualālai in Hawaiʻi. Here the trachyte is glassy and black in color. In Iceland, the Azores, Tenerife and Ascension there are recent trachytic lavas, and rocks of this kind occur also in New South Wales (Cambewarra Range), Queensland (Main Range), East Africa, Madagascar, Yemen and in many other districts.

Among the older volcanic rocks trachytes also are not scarce, though they have often been described under the names orthophyre and orthoclase-porphyry, while trachyte was reserved for Tertiary and recent rocks of similar composition. In England there are Permian trachytes in the Exeter district, and Carboniferous trachytes are found in many parts of the central valley of Scotland. The latter differ in no essential respect from their modern representatives in Italy and the Rhine valley, but their augite and biotite are often replaced by chlorite and other secondary products. Permian trachytes occur also in Thuringia and the Saar district in Germany.

Alkaline rocks such as trachyte are rare in the Archean, but become common in the Proterozoic. Alkaline rocks with an age close to 570 million years are common around the perimeters of many continental shields and are evidence of worldwide rifting at that time.

Closely allied to trachyte is the rock type called keratophyre, which is the sodium-rich-plagioclase equivalent of trachyte.

== See also ==
- List of rock types
