= Paling =

Paling is a surname. Notable people with the surname include:

- Chris Paling (born 1956), British author of modern fiction
- Wilfred Paling (1883–1971), British Labour Party politician
- William Paling (1892–1992), British Labour Party politician
