= Paddy Pallin ski classic =

Cross country ski event

The Paddy Pallin Classic was a cross country ski event held in the Australian Alps. Founded by Paddy Pallin in 1964 and ran for over 25 years. It was replaced by the Snowy Mountains Classic in 2000. The classic was notorious for its blizzards, and many contenders have stories to tell about their encounters with the elements in this race.
