= Mountain Trails Club (New South Wales) =

Australian conservation and bushwalking group

The Mountain Trails Club of New South Wales was an Australian conservation and bushwalking group.

The club was founded in 1914 by Myles Dunphy, Roy Rudder and Herbert Gallop Membership was by invitation only, and women were not permitted to join; the club espoused "a doctrine [of] manly and wholesome recreation". The Mountain Trails Club's work resulted in the formation of other bushwalking groups, such as the Sydney Bush Walkers Club, also founded by Dunphy.
