= Paddy Pallin =

Australian businessman

Frank Austin "Paddy" Pallin AM (1900 – 3 January 1991) was an Australian pioneer bushwalking and camping equipment retailer. He is best known for the Paddy Pallin chain of outdoors equipment stores he founded and as a founding member of the Search and Rescue arm of the Confederation of Bushwalking Clubs NSW in 1936. This was a predecessor of the Police Search and Rescue unit and New South Wales State Emergency Service.

== Biography ==
Born in County Durham, England, in 1900, Pallin developed a love for the outdoors while on family picnics and Scout trips to the Yorkshire countryside. After he emigrated to Sydney, Australia, in 1926 he worked initially as a sharefamer and then as an insurance clerk. He became an original member of the Sydney Bush Walkers Club which was founded in 1927 and then, becoming a victim of the Great Depression in 1930, he began making lightweight, waterproof outdoor equipment and clothing.

His business soon began to pay for itself when people realised bushwalking was a cheap activity and no one else was making high quality bush equipment. Pallin opened a store in George Street during the depression and as his business grew moved to other premises throughout the city. In 1933 Pallin wrote and published the book Bushwalking and Camping which he sold in his stores. In 1939 he co-founded, with Marie Byles, The Bush Club, a walking club with a different philosophy to the Sydney Bush Walkers Club. (Both clubs are still active today).

Pallin started cross-country skiing in 1954 but he quickly capitalised on the boom for the sport by retailing skiing equipment. This led him to become one of the country's biggest skiing, camping and bushwalking manufacturer and retailer.

In 1975 he established the Paddy Pallin Foundation to assist conservation projects and in the same year was appointed a Member of the Order of Australia. Pallin was involved in numerous community organisations including: the Youth Hostels Association, the Scout Association and the National Parks Association of NSW.

Paddy's autobiography Never Truly Lost is still looked to for inspiration by those interested in getting out into the wilderness.

== Notable achievements ==
- Was a founding member of the Search and Rescue arm of the Confederation of Bushwalking Clubs NSW in 1936. This was a predecessor of the Police Search and Rescue unit and New South Wales State Emergency Service, and is known today as the Bush Search and Rescue New South Wales, NSW SES Bush Search and Rescue.
- Started the Paddy Pallin outdoor store which still operates to this day.
- Helped to establish Pennant Hills Scout Camp.
- Started the annual Paddy Pallin Orienteering Competition In 1963.
- Established the Paddy Pallin ski classic in 1964.
- Was pivotal in the foundation of the River Canoe Club in 1935.

== Bibliography ==
- Pallin, Paddy (1933). Bushwalking and Camping. Sydney: P. Pallin.
- Pallin, Paddy (1959). Bushwalking around Sydney. Sydney: Angus & Robertson.
- Pallin, Paddy (1987). Never Truly Lost: the recollections of Paddy Pallin. Kensington, N.S.W.: N.S.W. University Press. ISBN 0-86840-194-3.
