= Sydney Bush Walkers Club =

Australian bushwalking club

The Sydney Bush Walkers Club is a bushwalking club in Australia.

Formed in 1927 by Myles Dunphy at the behest of the Mountain Trails Club, the group was originally called the Waratah Walking Club, but was renamed early on. Unlike its predecessor, the club was open to the general public, and this allowed it to increase its membership substantially; a petition presented in the same year (signed by members of both clubs) contained over 5,000 signatures.

The Sydney Bush Walkers Club continued to campaign for environmental causes throughout the 1930s and although membership has fallen to around 800, it still continues to organise events.

Notable members of the club have included Marie Byles, Paddy Pallin, and Dot Butler.
