= Myles and Milo Dunphy =

Australian conservationists

Myles Dunphy OBE FRAIA
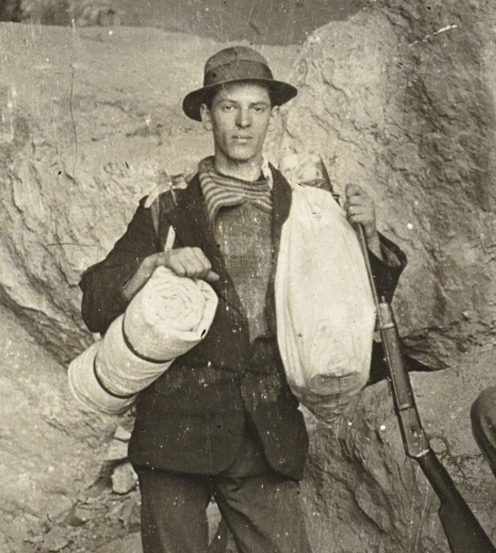
- Myles Dunphy, Jenolan Caves, New South Wales, 1912
- Born: Myles Joseph Dunphy; 19 October 1891; South Melbourne, Victoria, Australia
- Died: 1985 (aged 93–94); Peakhurst, New South Wales, Australia
- Occupation: Conservationist
- Known for: Protection of Blue Mountains National Park

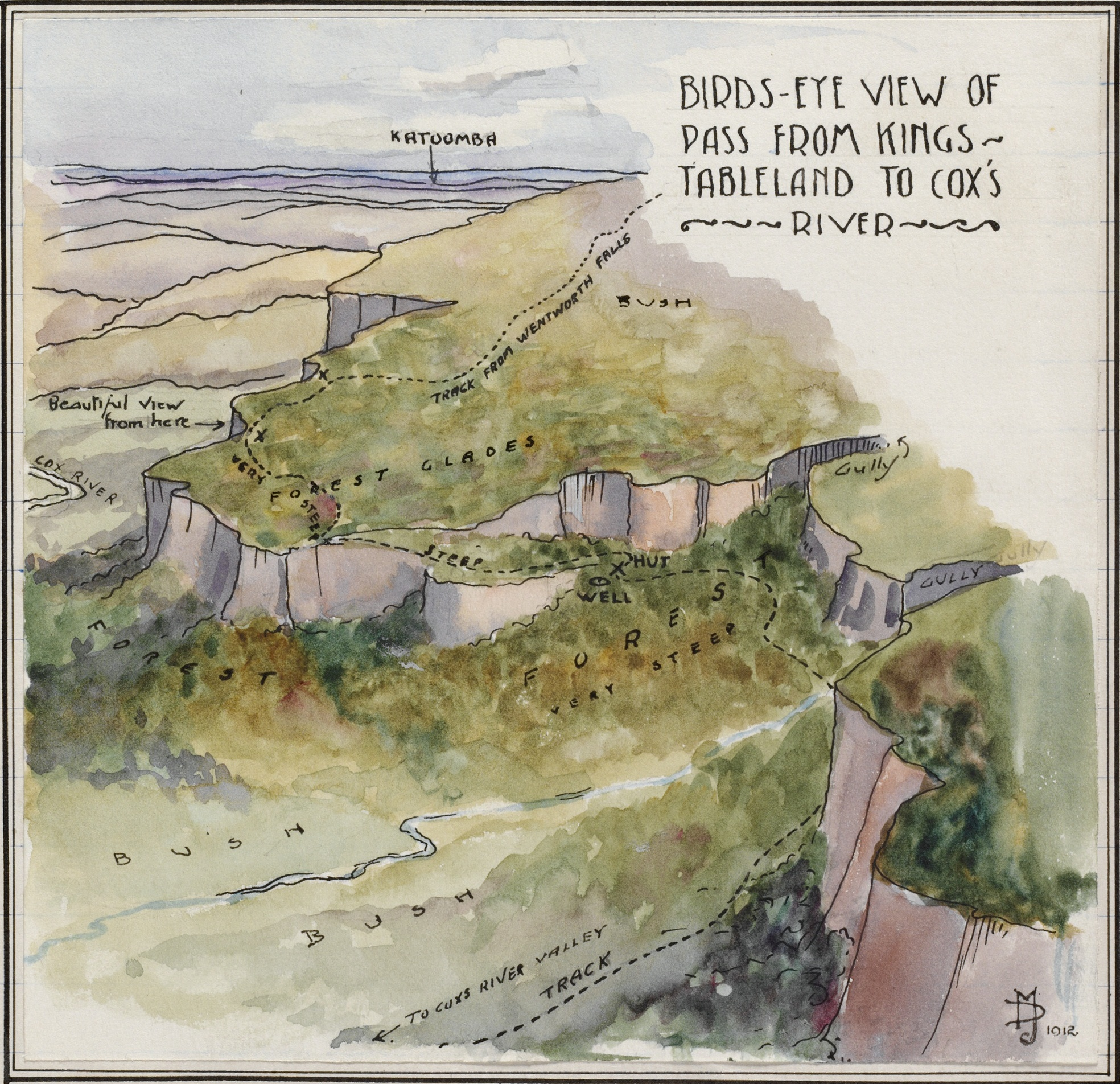
Image from one of Myles Dunphy's notebooks, "Birds-eye view of pass from Kings Tableland to Cox's River"

Myles Dunphy and Milo Dunphy were Australian conservationists who played an important role in creating the Australian wilderness movement.

== Myles Dunphy ==
Myles Joseph Dunphy OBE (1891—1985) was an Australian conservationist best known for the protection of parts of the Blue Mountains National Park.

=== Biography ===
Myles Dunphy was born on 19 October 1891 and lived in Oatley, a southern suburb of Sydney, and started his wilderness publicity work in 1910. He compiled detailed maps of a number of areas of conservation interest in New South Wales. His original maps of the Blue Mountains, in particular the Coxs River and Kowmung River catchments, featured imaginative and original naming systems. Throughout his life he campaigned for wilderness areas throughout New South Wales.

His interest in bushwalking led to the foundation of the Mountain Trails Club of New South Wales, and was influential in the formation of the Sydney Bushwalkers and the Confederation of Bushwalking Clubs in 1932. He also formed the National Parks and Primitive Areas Council, and took steps to establish a professional parks service.

He was appointed an Officer of the Order of the British Empire in 1976 in recognition of service to conservation, and was awarded an IUCN Packer Award for Long Merit in National Parks.

== Milo Dunphy ==
Milo Dunphy AM
- Born: Milo Kanangra Dunphy; 13 May 1929
- Died: 13 April 1996 (aged 66); Darlinghurst, Sydney
- Occupations: Architect, Conservationist
- Known for: Formation of the Australian Conservation Foundation

Milo Kanangra Dunphy AM (1929—1996), the son of Myles Dunphy, was an Australian conservationist best known for the reinvigoration of the Australian Conservation Foundation and his political activism to preserve wilderness areas in New South Wales.

=== Biography ===
Milo Dunphy was an activist who campaigned on several fronts. He was known for his work in the preservation of the Colong Caves, which were being targeted for limestone mining, and also for his contribution to the preservation of the Boyd Plateau, which was to be planted with lime trees. He helped to double the area of national park space in New South Wales from 2 to 4.5 percent.

He accompanied his parents, Myles and Margaret, as an infant in 1930–31 on bushwalks in the Blue Mountains. A special perambulator with an iron frame, a wicker basket with hood and rubber-tyred wheels, nicknamed 'the Kanangra Express', was used to wheel him through rough terrain.

Milo Dunphy stood as a candidate in the 1974 federal election, as a candidate for the Australia Party for the Division of Cook; and in the 1983 federal election, as an independent candidate for the Division of Bennelong against John Howard, at that time Treasurer (and later Prime Minister). Dunphy Jnr. was active through Australian conservation organisations including the Australian Conservation Foundation, the Colong Foundation for Wilderness, the Nature Conservation Council, and the Total Environment Centre, of which he was the founding Director.

=== Recognition ===
He was appointed a Member of the Order of Australia in 1986 for services to conservation, received the Sydney Luker Award from the Australian Institute of Planning, and an honorary degree from the University of New South Wales. Dunphy's papers and illustrated journals were bequeathed to the State Library of New South Wales and featured in the Library's 2018 exhibition UNESCO Six.

== Shared legacy ==
The work of the Dunphy family continues through the Dunphy Wilderness Fund, which purchases leasehold and privately held areas of natural significance, spending A$1 million per annum (since September 1996).

The Australian Foundation for Wilderness, known until 2022 as the Colong Foundation for Wilderness, the successor to Myles Dunphy's National Parks and Primitive Areas Council, is Australia's longest-serving community advocate for wilderness.
