= Rydal rail underbridges =

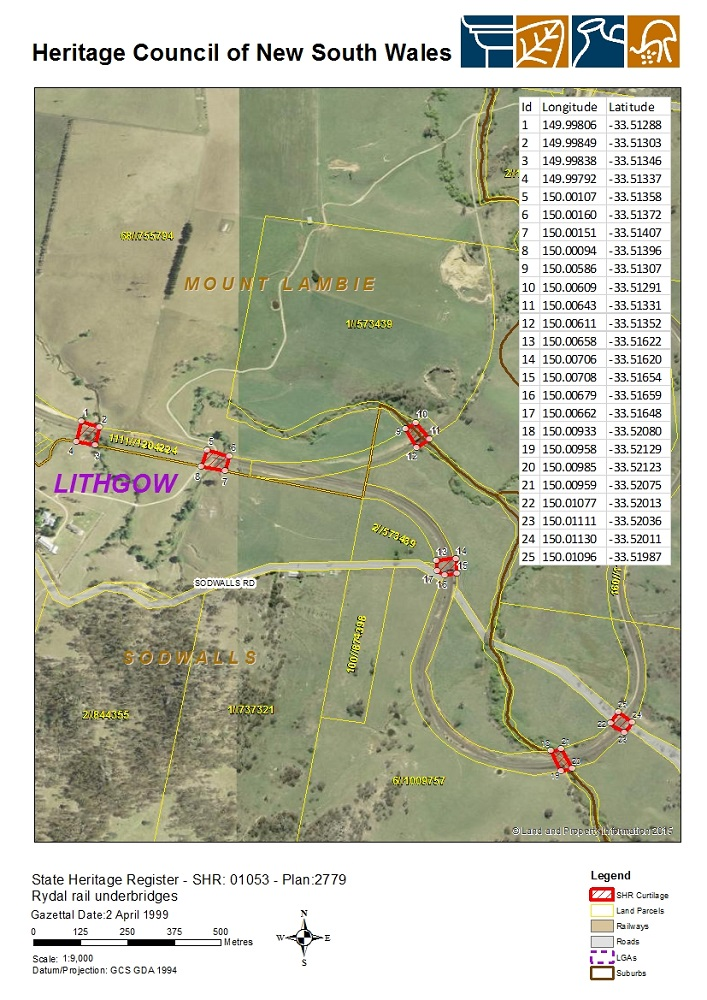
- Heritage boundaries
- Coordinates: 33°30′59″S 150°00′25″E
- Carries: Main Western Line
- Crosses: Solitary Creek
- Locale: Rydal, City of Lithgow, New South Wales, Australia
- Begins: Rydal (east)
- Ends: Sodwalls (west)
- Other name: Railway Crossings 1–6 (Rydal/Sodwalls)
- Owner: Transport Asset Manager of New South Wales

Characteristics
- Design: Underbridges and viaducts
- Material: Stone and brick

Rail characteristics
- No. of tracks: One
- Track gauge: 4 ft 8 1/2 in (1,435 mm) standard gauge

History
- Construction end: 1872 and 1916

New South Wales Heritage Register
- Official name: Rydal rail underbridges
- Type: State heritage (built)
- Designated: 2 April 1999
- Reference no.: 1053
- Type: Railway Bridge/Viaduct
- Category: Transport – Rail

Location
- Interactive map of Rydal rail underbridges

The Rydal rail underbridges are a series of heritage-listed railway underbridges and viaducts that carry the Main Western line over Solitary Creek at Rydal, in the City of Lithgow local government area of New South Wales, Australia. The property is owned by Transport Asset Manager of New South Wales, an agency of the Government of New South Wales. It was added to the New South Wales State Heritage Register on 2 April 1999.

== Historical context ==
By 1900 some sections of the single-track railway network in New South Wales were operating at or near saturation. These included The Great Zig Zag near Lithgow, the Main West from Emu Plains to Bathurst, the Main South from Picton as far as Harden and the Main North between Maitland and Muswellbrook. Also, the metropolitan railways were congested due to the combination of suburban and freight traffic. The solution was a series of deviations to ease the gradients, and double tracks (duplications) to increase traffic capacity.

The programme of duplications and deviations began around 1910 and was largely completed by 1922. Some sections were not completed until the 1950s. As part of the duplication and deviation works, new bridges were required, with the principal material for new bridges and culverts being bricks. Steel was an expensive option (requiring importation from Britain) whereas the use of bricks complied with a long-standing policy to use local materials as far as possible to contain costs. The establishment of the State Brickworks at Homebush in 1912 greatly increased the supply of bricks in the early 20th century. The period from 1910 to 1922 was dominated by the use of bricks. Thereafter, supplies of imported steel increased and BHP Newcastle was able to meet local demands for structural steel products, resulting in the cessation of the use of bricks for the construction of railway bridges. On the Main West, deviation work began on both sides of the Blue Mountains in 1910, with the Glenbrook 1913 double-track deviation (1910–13) starting at Emu Plains, the Ten Tunnels Deviation of the Lithgow Zig Zag (1897–1910), and the section at Solitary Creek (from Rydal to Sodwalls) completed between 1910 and 1915.

== Description ==
The complex consists of six stone single-track 4 ft 8 1/2 in (1,435 mm) standard gauge viaducts and bridges, dated from 1872 and 1916, either in use and extended for double line or abandoned on deviation in 1906. The physical condition of the complex was considered good, with some bridges and viaducts still in use for the carriage of passenger and freight rail.

The single track Main Western Railway reached Sodwalls and Tarana in April 1872 along a more-or-less direct route from Rydal. This route involved a number of steep grades and crossings of Solitary Creek. Around 1906, a deviation was built where the line went in a longer route with reduced grades. The old route retains a number of viaducts, the longest “No. 6 Viaduct” with four arches.

== Heritage listing ==
Rydal rail underbridges was listed on the New South Wales State Heritage Register on 2 April 1999 having satisfied the following criteria.

The place possesses uncommon, rare or endangered aspects of the cultural or natural history of New South Wales.

This item is assessed as historically rare. This item is assessed as scientifically rare. This item is assessed as arch. rare. This item is assessed as socially rare.

== See also ==
- List of railway bridges in New South Wales
- Rydal railway station
