= Mudgee railway station =

Disused railway station in New South Wales, Australia

Mudgee
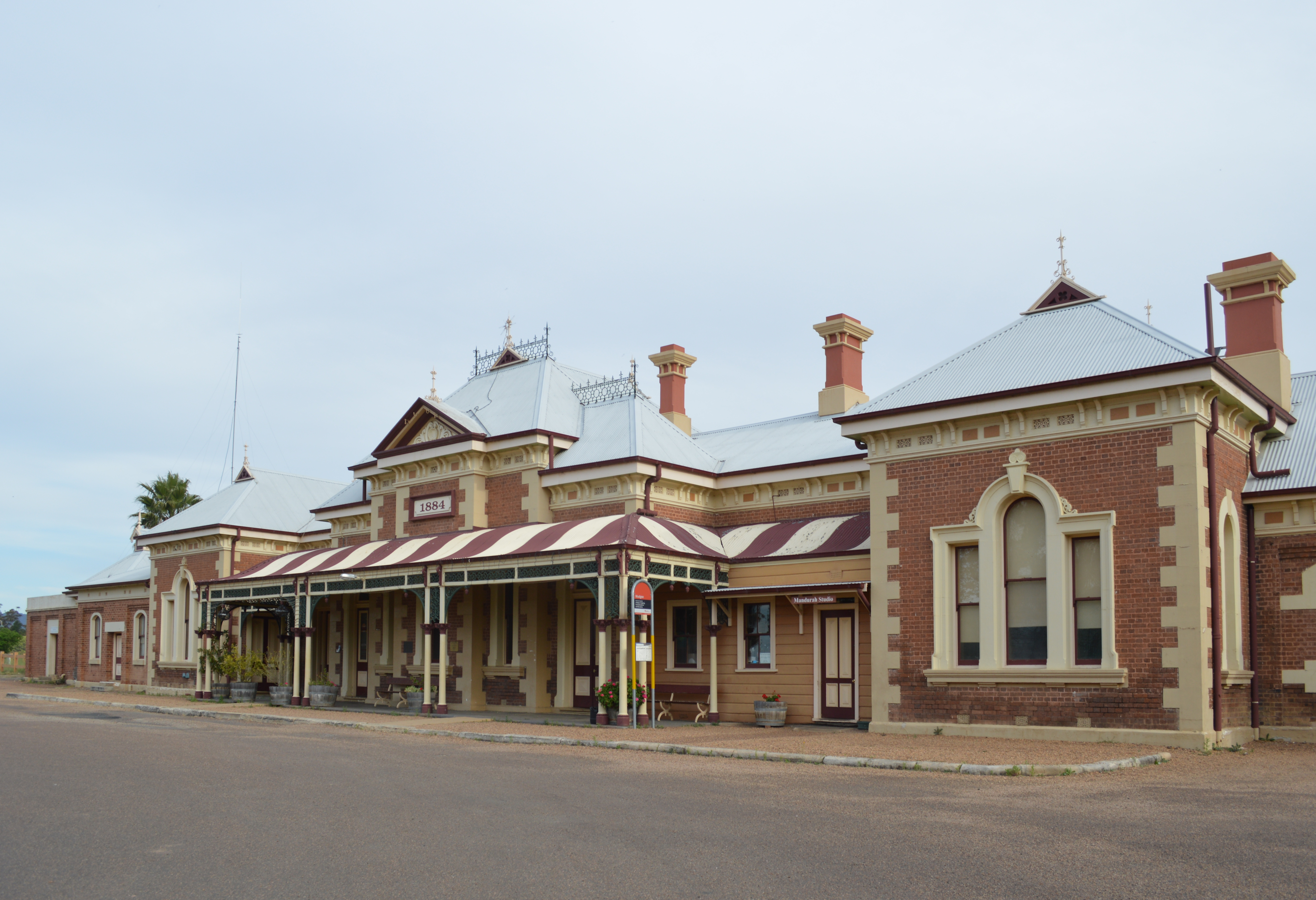
- Mudgee railway station, pictured in 2015 with coach stand in front

General information
- Coordinates: 32.6012°S 149.5877°E
- Owner: Transport Asset Holding Entity
- Operator: Transport for NSW
- Line: Gwabegar
- Distance: 308.1 kilometres from Central
- Platforms: 1 (side)
- Tracks: 2

Construction
- Architect: John Whitton
- Architectural style: Victorian boom style

Other information
- Status: NSW TrainLink coach stop

History
- Opened: 11 September 1884
- Closed: 1985

Former services
Preceding station	Former services	Following station
Munna towards Gwabegar	Gwabegar Line	Mount Frome towards Wallerawang

New South Wales Heritage Database (Local Government Register)
- Official name: Mudgee Railway Station, yard and locomotive yard
- Type: state heritage (complex / group)
- Designated: 2 April 1999
- Type: Railway Platform / Station
- Category: Transport – Rail
- Builders: New South Wales Government Railways
Location

Mudgee railway station is a heritage-listed disused railway station on the Gwabegar railway line in Mudgee, Mid-Western Regional Council, New South Wales, Australia. It was designed by John Whitton and built from 1883 to 1884; the property was added to the New South Wales State Heritage Register on 2 April 1999.

Though no trains run through the station, it is served by NSW TrainLink coaches running between Lithgow railway station and Coonabarabran.

== History ==
Mudgee residents made representations during the planning of the Great Western Railway to have the line built from Newcastle to Singleton and on to Mudgee. Bathurst, however, was successful in having the line extended from Penrith, which was completed in 1876.

The residents of Mudgee continued to lobby for their own line and formed a committee in 1870 to advance their cause. In 1873, the Government of New South Wales proposed a line between Kelso and Mudgee, but when nothing happened, residents formed the Mudgee Railway league in 1875. Small progress was made in 1876, when a survey was undertaken, but work did not progress until 1879 when Parliament voted for the construction of a line between Wallerwang and Mudgee. This bill was mainly due to the efforts of Sir John Robertson, member for Mudgee and Chairman of the Mudgee Railway League. Sir John was honoured for his efforts, turning the first sod for the line on 23 September 1880.

The line, however, was not officially opened until 11 September 1884. Extravagant celebrations marked the opening of the line, beginning with the arrival of the decorated mail train on the morning of the 10 September. This was followed by a picnic at Market Square, now Robertson Park. The official opening followed on the 11th with a procession of bands through the streets to the station where the ministerial train broke the ribbon. Celebrations continued at Market Square with an outdoor feast and a banquet and ball in the evening. Sheedy (1988:15) states that the opening of the railway "was the climax of one of the greatest days in the history of Mudgee and saw the realization of nearly 25 years hard and persistent representation by the citizens for "their" railway."

The station building was designed by John Whitton, Engineer and built according to his plan. Whitton seems to have realised the importance of the railway to people of Mudgee and created a building in scale and grandeur that was only surpassed by the Devonshire Street Terminus and the station buildings in Newcastle, Albury and Hay.

The yard layout has not changed significantly since 1883, although the Station Master's Residence, Railway Institute, Signal's and Examiner's Cabins and Garages have been demolished.

Passenger train services to Mudgee ceased in 1985. The station building was used for some years as FreightCorp and Pacific National accommodation and leased by community groups. Much of the interior of the building was converted into a restaurant in 2005, with alterations to the general waiting room, entrance/lobby and booking office, the installation of kitchen facilities and temporary fencing on the station platform. The restaurant opened in February 2006. It was later replaced by an Indian restaurant, which ceased operation c. 2015.

The line through Mudgee was closed in 1992 and reopened in 2000. Heritage trains occasionally called at the station before the line was "suspended from use" in 2007. Advocates have since called for the reinstatement of train services. A 2023 survey, conducted by supporters, of 4,250 residents along the line found that 95.5 percent were in favour.

As of 2018, the station was used by the Mandurah Studio Craft Co-operative, the Arts and Crafts Mudgee gallery and as a veterans' drop-in centre run by the Mudgee sub-branch of the Vietnam Veterans Peacekeepers and Peacemakers Association.

== Description ==
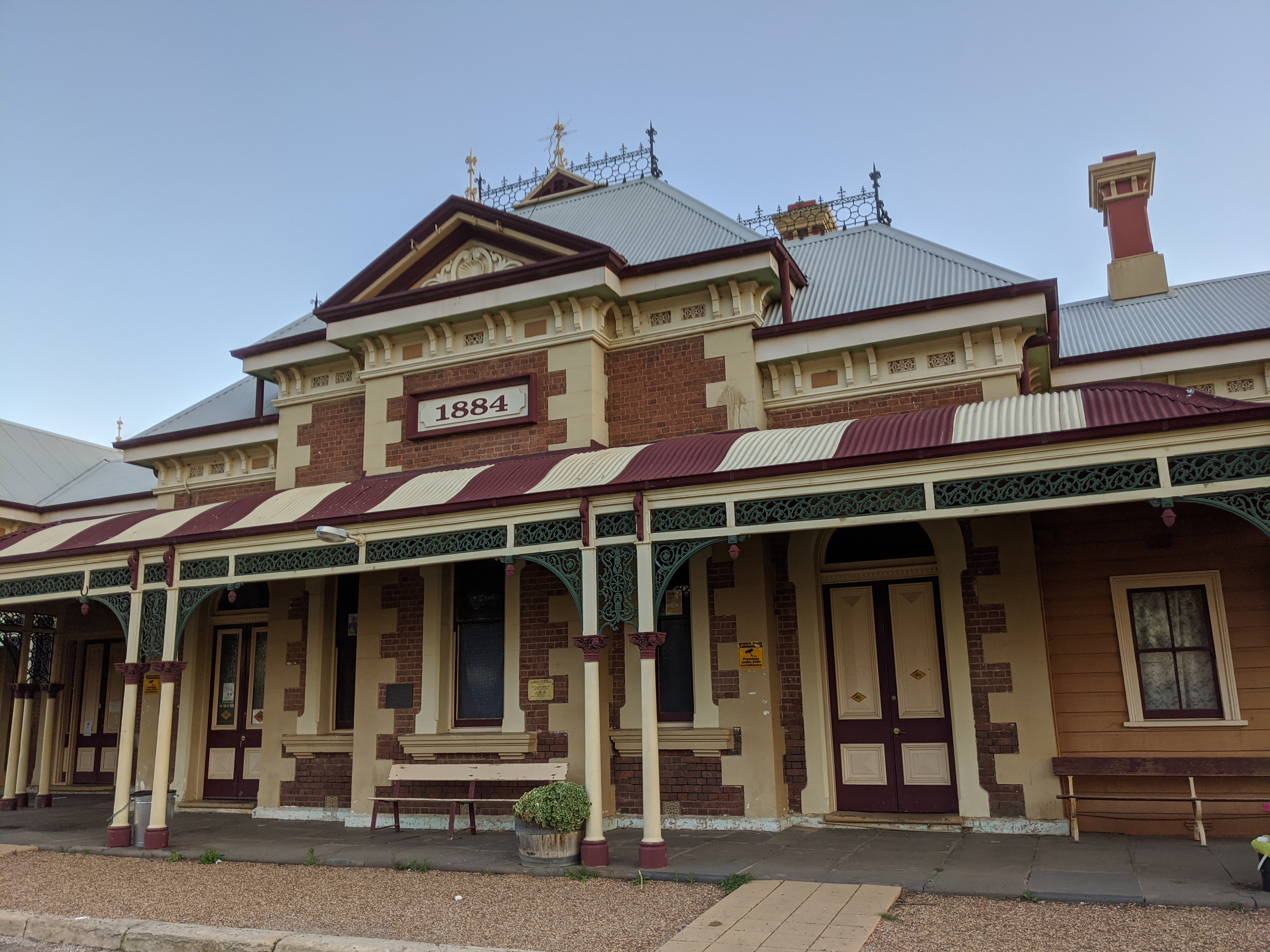
Mudgee railway station in 2020

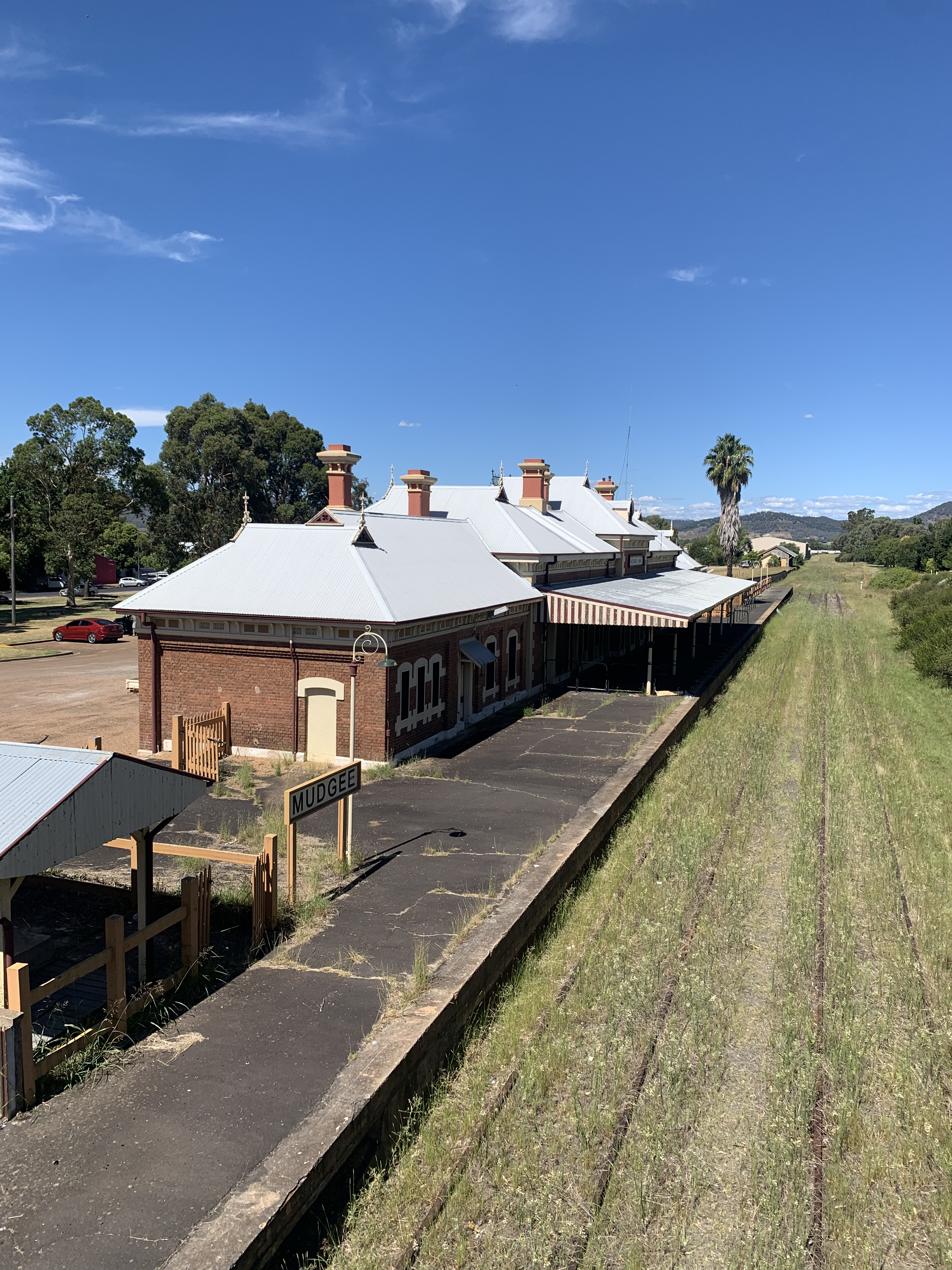
The station from a footbridge, 2025

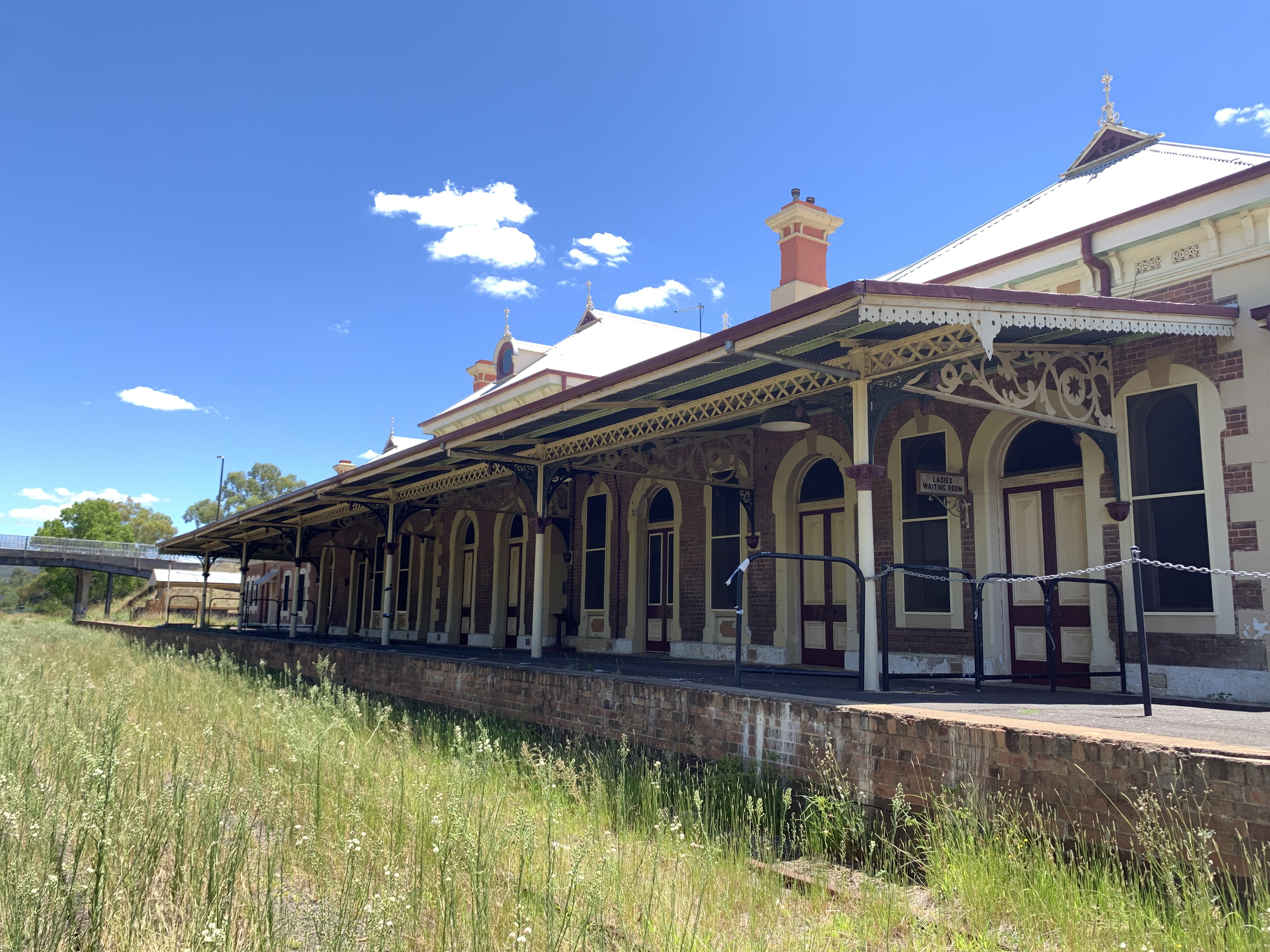
The station viewed from the tracks, 2025

Yard

The yard runs east–west in an elongated form matching the railway line. It terminates at the eastern end with a concrete overbridge. To the west of the station building is the foot warming furnace and coal bins, which have been roofed. The Station is surrounded by a gravelled parking area and nature strip to the north, by the goods yard to the east, which includes the dock, crane, weighbridge and office. Further east is the Engine Running Shed and associated buildings. A range of residences and the Barracks line Inglis Street. To the south of the Station, and across the tracks, is a park-like area leased to the Mudgee Base Hospital.

Station Building

The Station is a break fronted building of red brick with sandstone foundations and quoins. A massing of roof structure in the centre of the building provides a focus, being decorated with cast iron finials and crestings. A date plaque sits underneath this central moulded pediment. The roof is hipped corrugated iron with ridge vents and is also broken by elaborately moulded chimneys. A band of painted renderwork decorates the exterior at cornice level. Wings at either end of the building form the termination of the cast iron verandah on the Inglis Street face, while facing the tracks an elaborate awning runs the length of the building. Pavilions at either end of the Station were once free standing, but have been linked by later infill.

Internally, a sense of space is created by the use of high ceilings. The walls are plastered and many rooms retain their hardwood floors. Externally, the windows and fanlights have arched heads, but internally are finished horizontally with squared architraves. One room appears to have retained its original chimney piece, but all other fixtures have been removed.

List of associated buildings and structures

Western Area

- Foot warmer furnace and coal bins
- Church Street overbridge
- Former Church Street Gatehouse (1883), 162 Church Street (not in SHR curtilage?)

Eastern Area

- Underground brick tanks, one near goods yard entrance and the other near barracks building
- Barracks building (1987)
- Weighbridge (stamped H. Pooley & Son Ltd., Birmingham and London No.524) and Weighbridge Office
- Goods Shed and platform (1883)
- Jib Crane (10 ton steel crane stamped H.P. Gregory & Co., San Francisco Cal.)
- Group of small timber-framed buildings used by staff
- Engine Shed (1891) Loco Store (1891), tanks (1883) and associated pits, water columns and coal stages.
- Railway staff (former Guards, Engine Driver's and Porter's Cottages - 1883), Cottages 9–15 Inglis Street
- Former Barracks and Staff Residence (1883), 5-7 Inglis Street
- 60 foot turntable (1903)

=== Modifications and dates ===
- 1883–84: Construction according to original plans
- 1911: Addition of Refreshment Room and Parcel office in adjoining yard.
- 1917: Old "Out Of" room converted into a bar
- 1920: Telegraph Office inserted in enclosed verandah. Further enclosures were undertaken to augment staff facilities. Main facade altered through the creation of doors from windows and rendering and painting the brickwork.
- 1944: Present Parcels Office and "Out Of" room constructed.

== Heritage listing ==
Mudgee station and yard group is one of the best surviving Victorian station and yard groups in which most of the components are intact with major structures surviving from the time of opening and from early in the 1900s. It exhibits the confidence in railway construction in the 1880s and the continuation of that confidence by the quality of the extensions to the station building in 1913 when most railway buildings were standardised and of cheaper construction. It is one of the very few similar buildings to survive without exterior masonry being painted. The station building, although added to, retains its early form and is a major civic building in Mudgee. It marks an important phase in railway construction at the end of the boom period, following the goldrushes to western NSW.

Mudgee railway station was listed on the New South Wales State Heritage Register on 2 April 1999 having satisfied the following criteria.

The place is important in demonstrating aesthetic characteristics and/or a high degree of creative or technical achievement in New South Wales.

The Mudgee Railway Station is of State significance as a fine example of a Victorian boom style railway station.

The Railway Station is of local significance as a town landmark.

The place possesses uncommon, rare or endangered aspects of the cultural or natural history of New South Wales.

The Mudgee Railway Station and yard are of State significance as a rare surviving example of original railway line and siding arrangements. The Railway Station is rare in the degree and extent to which it retains its original fabric and character.

The place is important in demonstrating the principal characteristics of a class of cultural or natural places/environments in New South Wales.

The Mudgee Railway Station and yard are of State significance as being representative of large country railway stations erected in the late Victorian period. It is a fine example of its type due to its integrity and the retention of original fabric, particularly in relation to the layout of the rails and sidings.

== Gallery ==
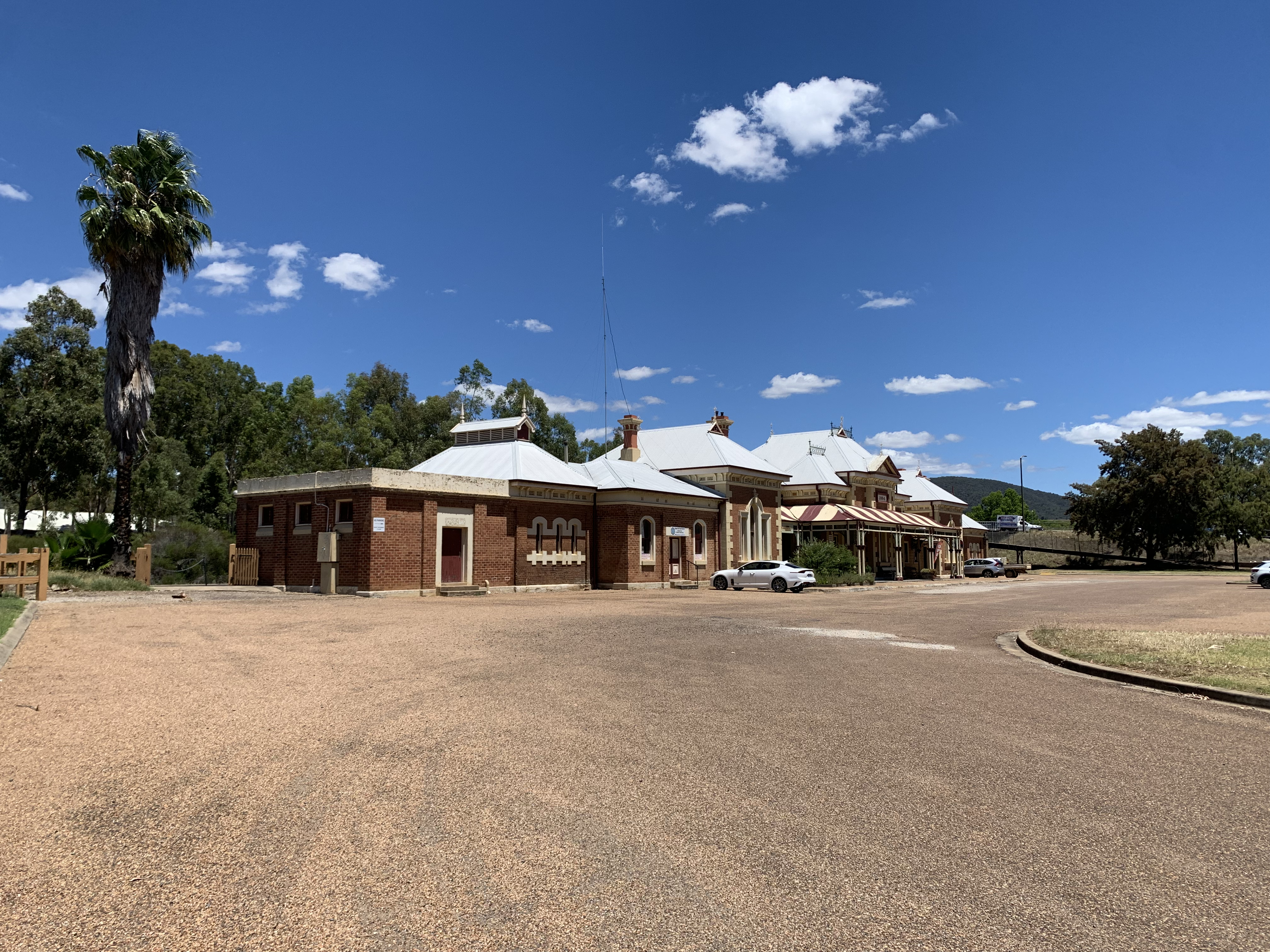

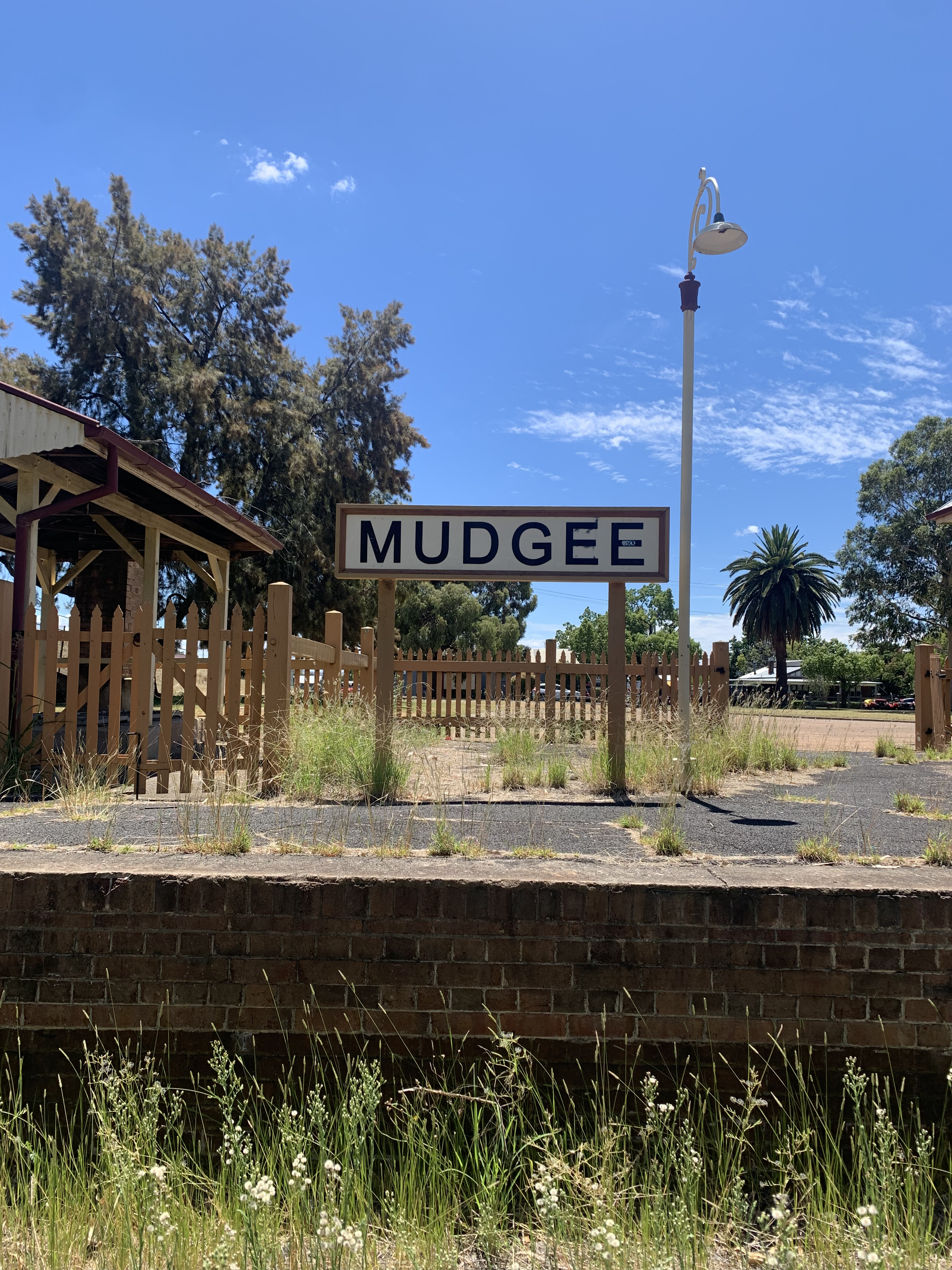

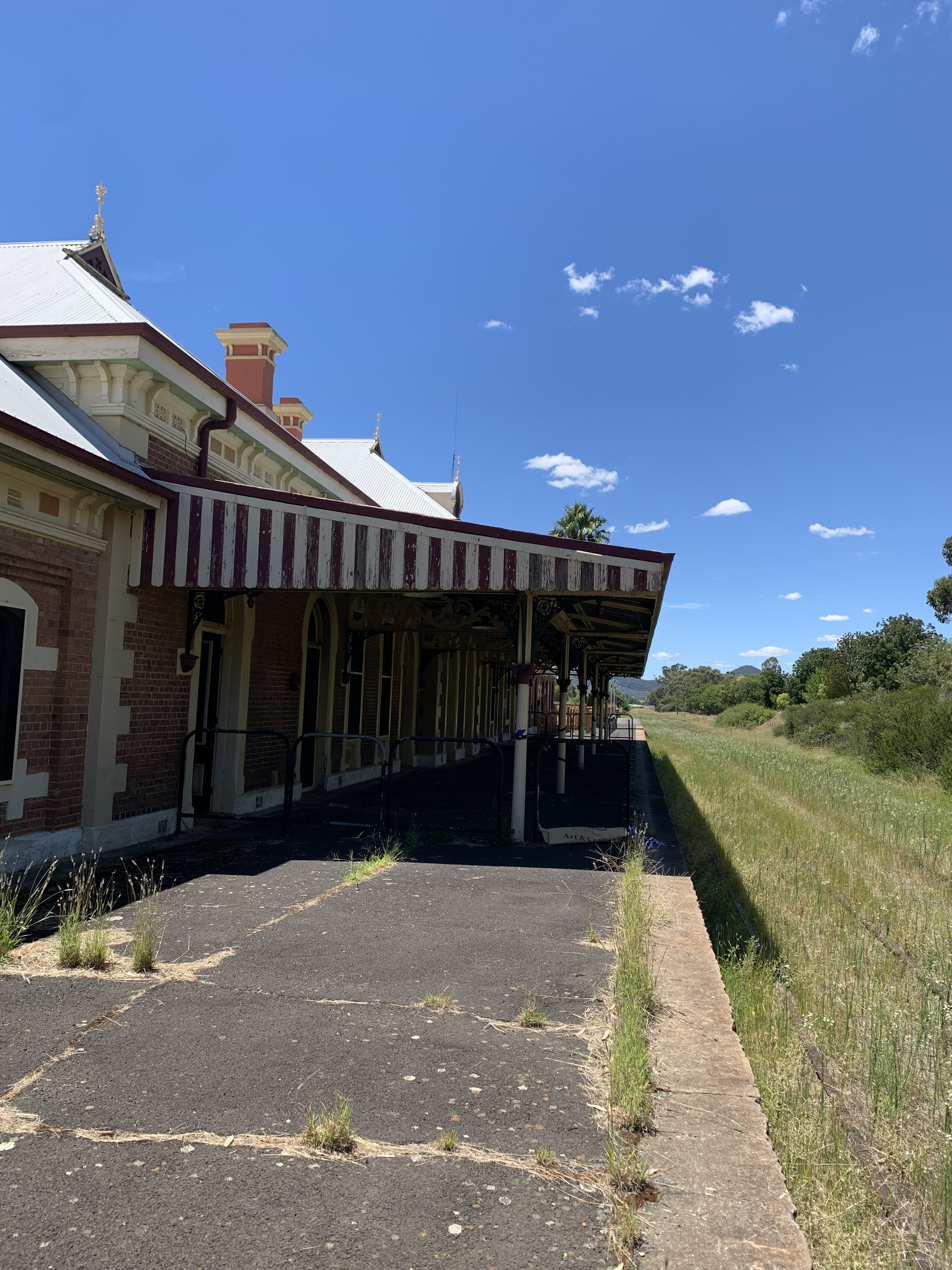

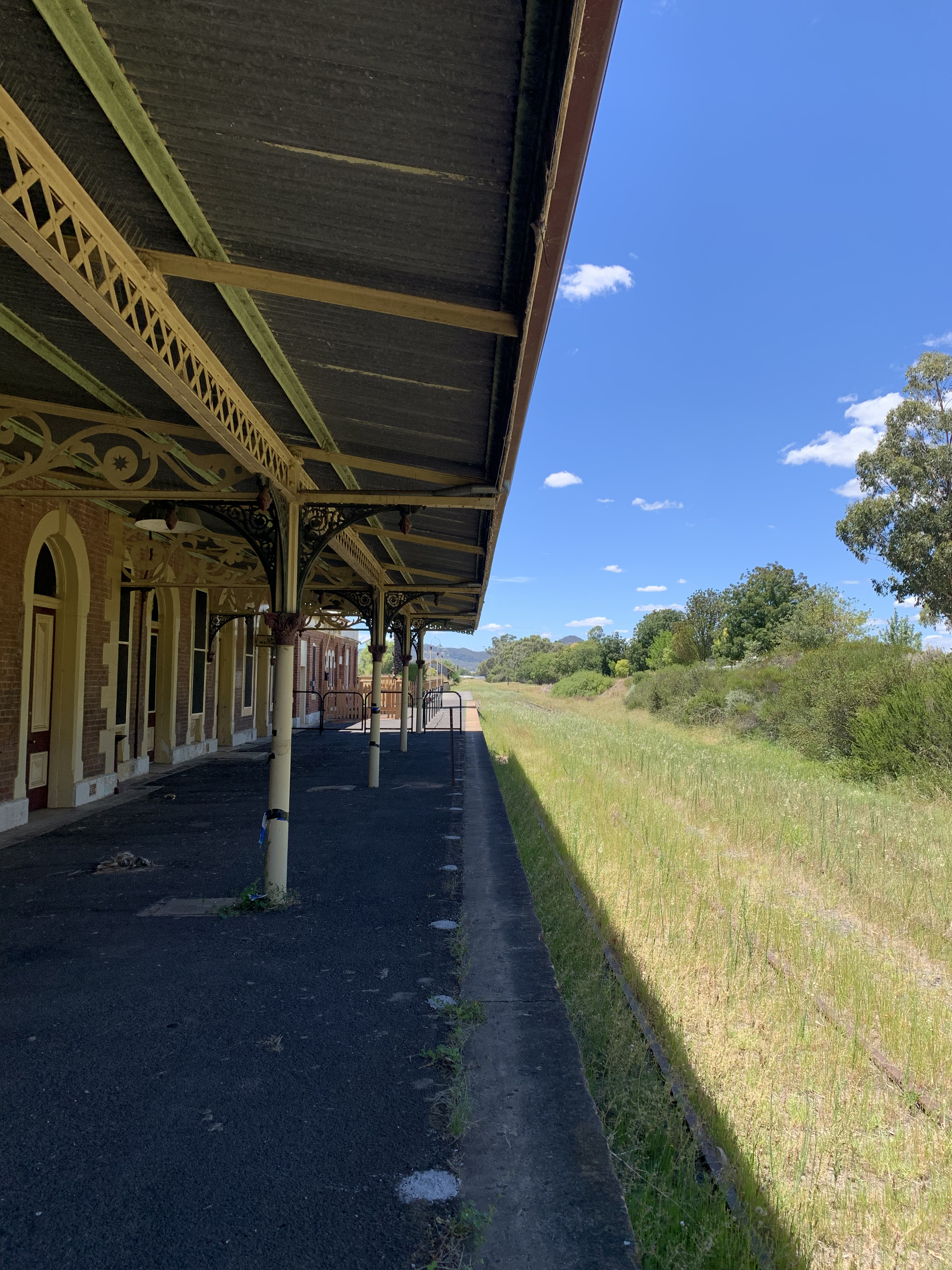

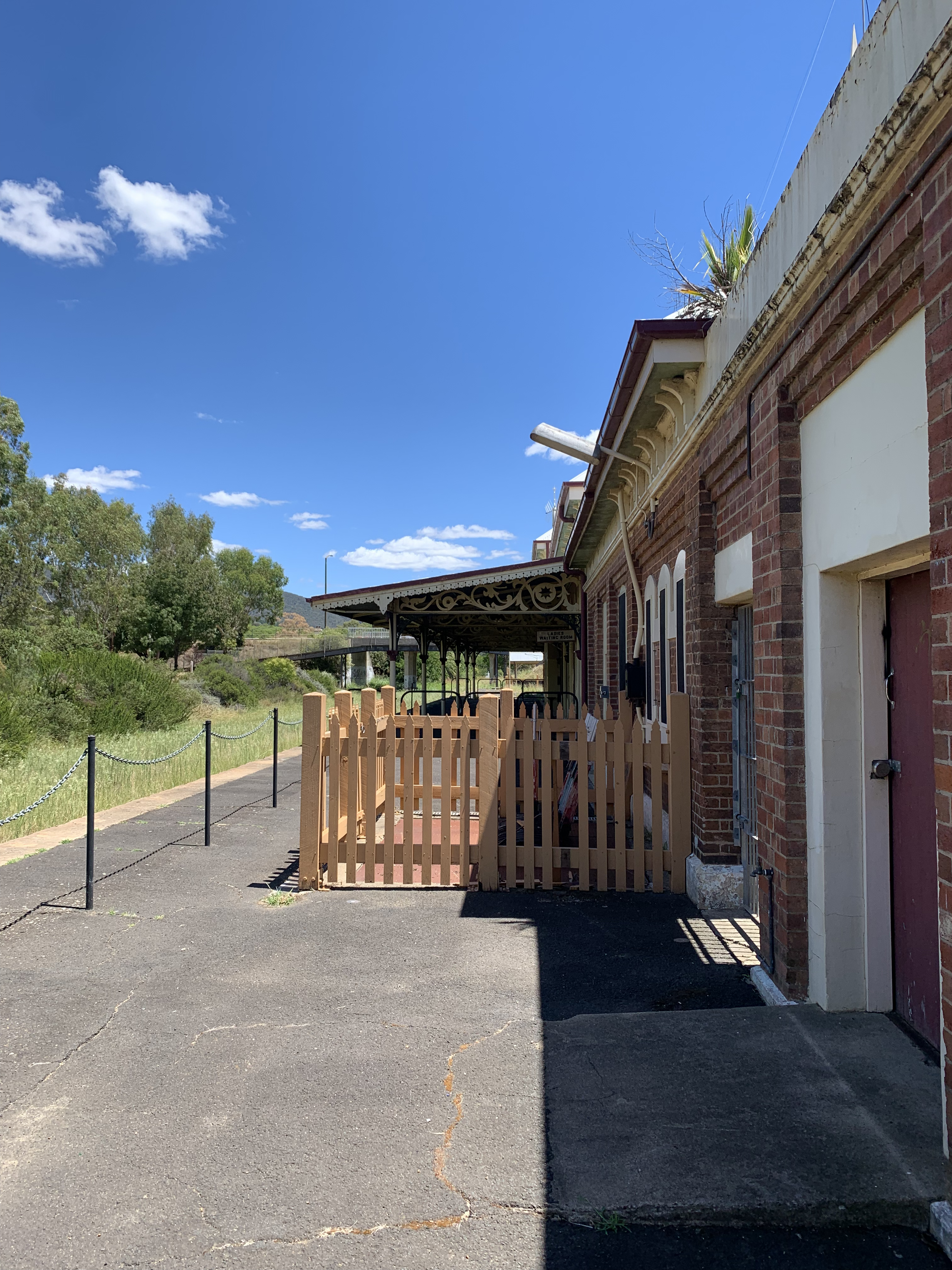

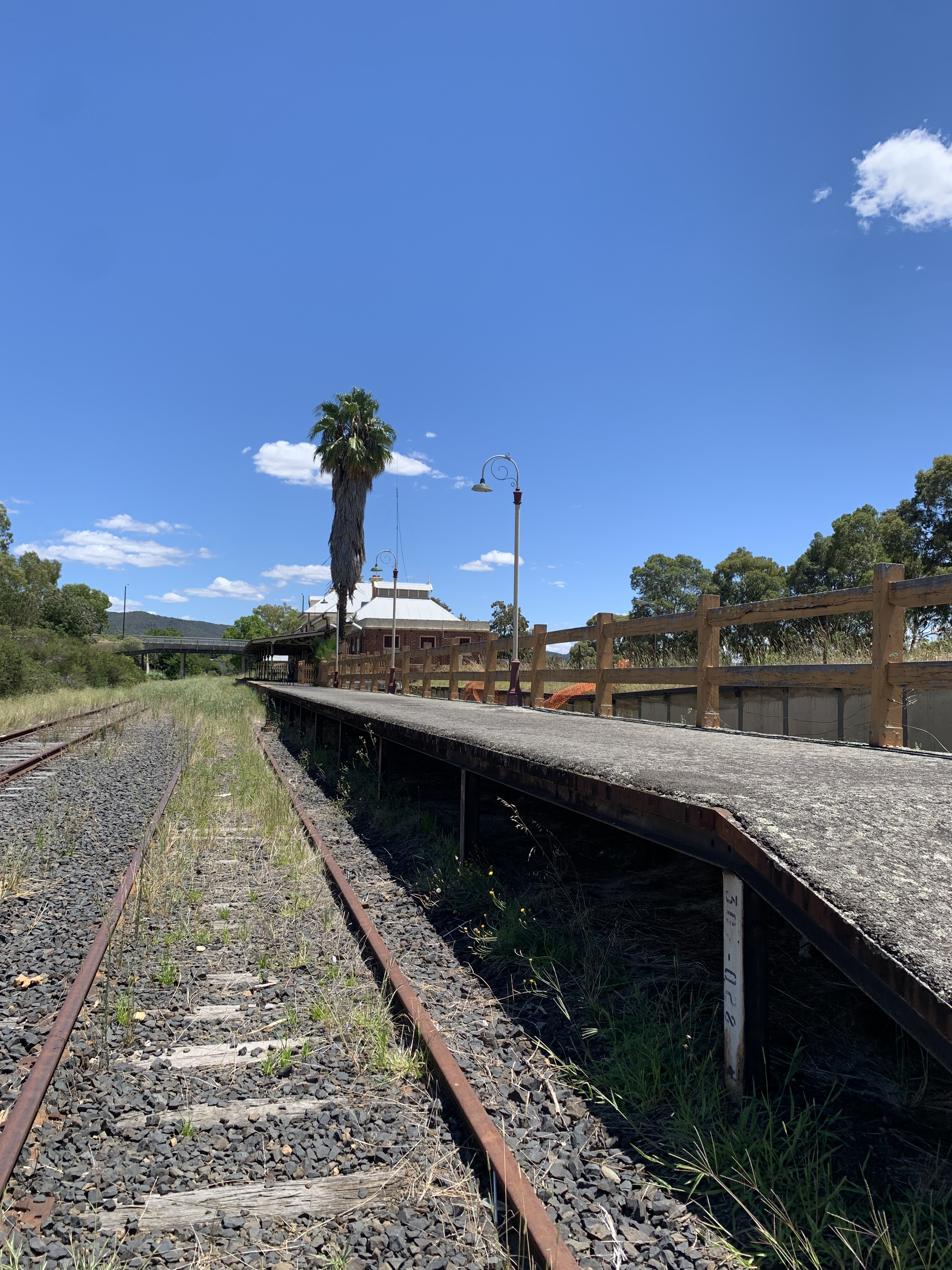

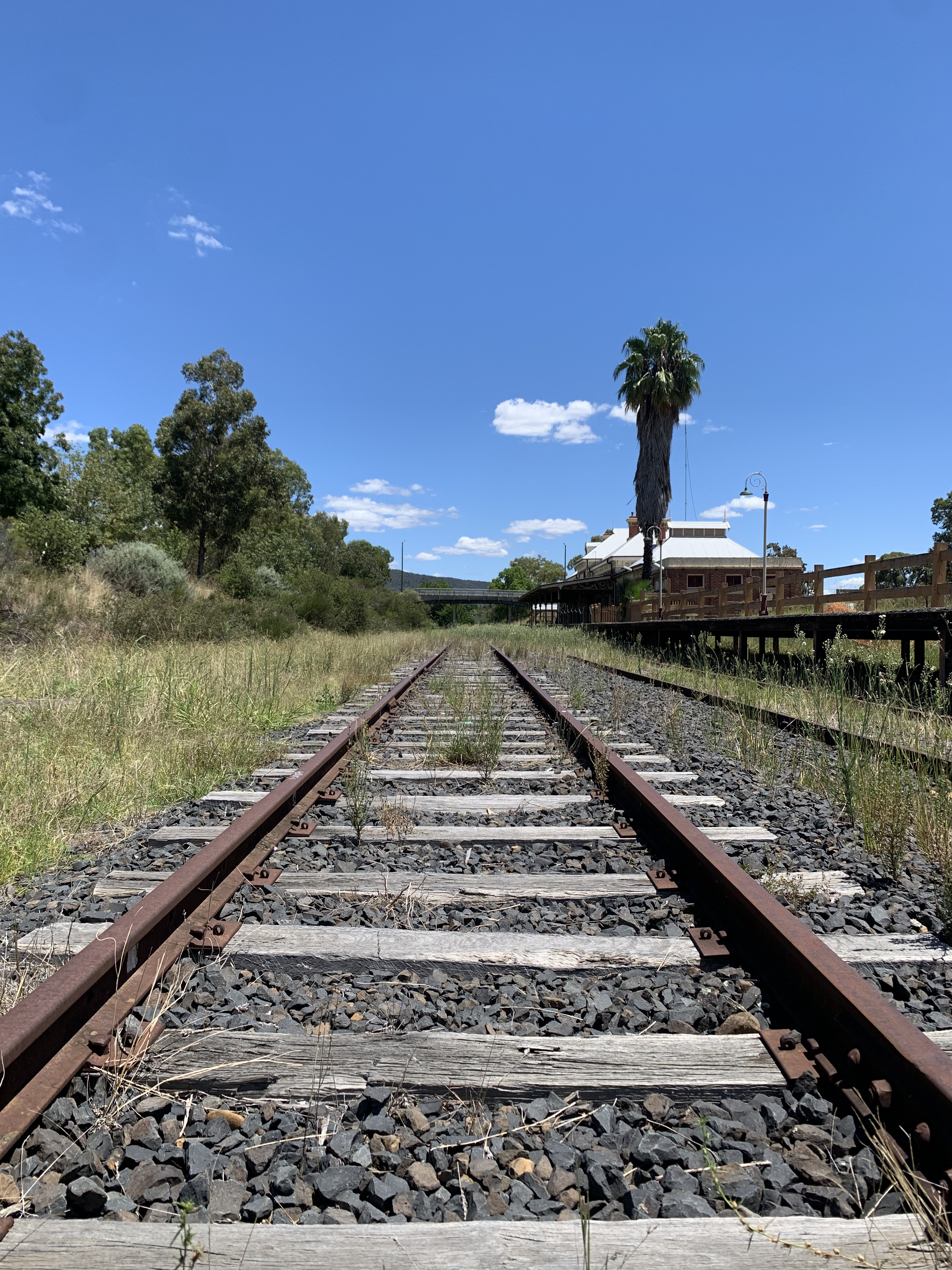

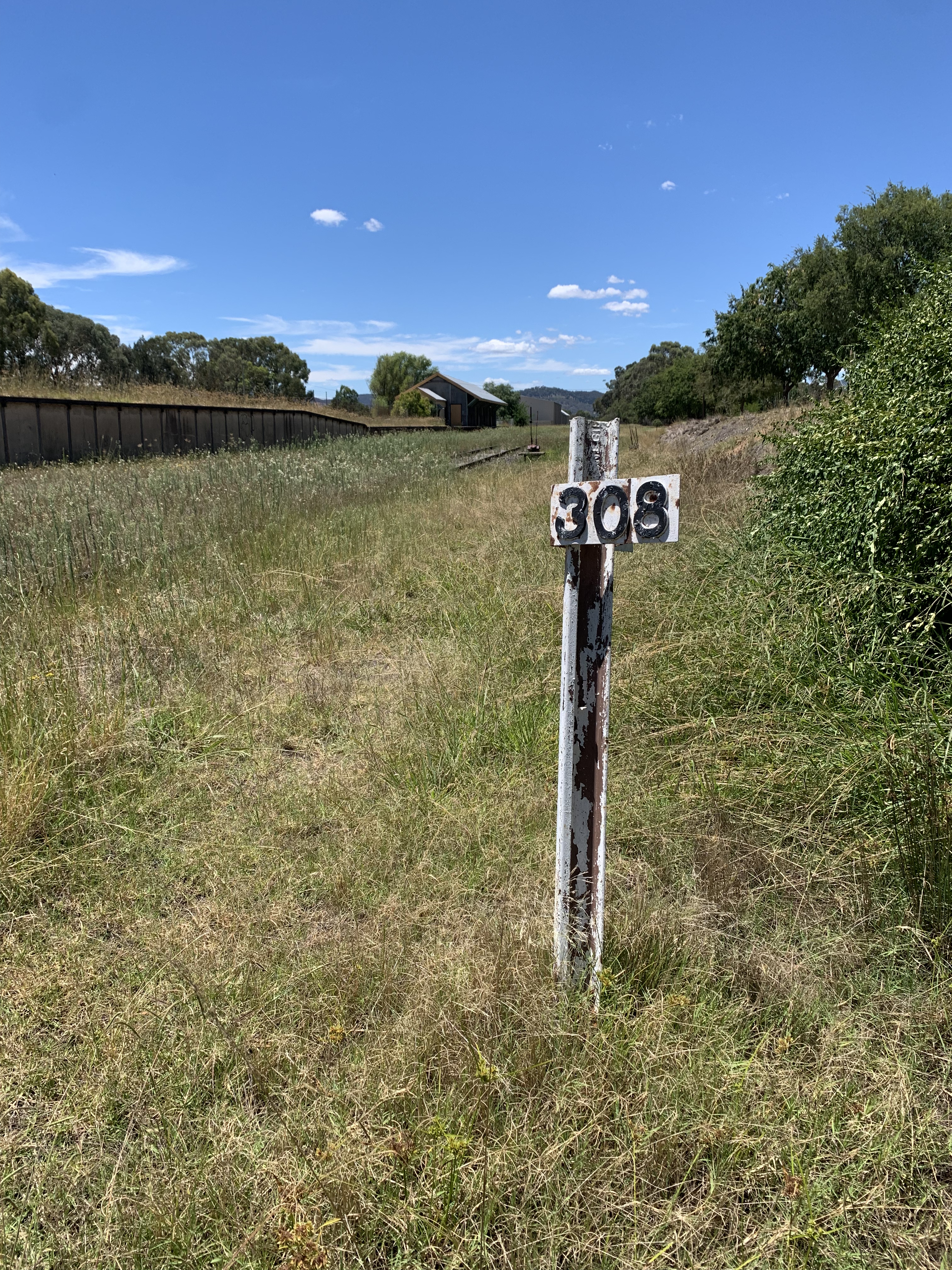
Distance from Sydney Central

== See also ==
- List of disused railway stations in regional New South Wales
