= Lidsdale =

- Town
- Interactive map of Lidsdale
- Coordinates: 33°23′24″S 150°05′05″E
- Country: Australia
- State: New South Wales
- Region: Central Tablelands
- LGA: City of Lithgow
- Location: 58 km (36 mi) E of Bathurst; 14.5 km (9.0 mi) NW of Lithgow; 113 km (70 mi) SSE of Mudgee; 152 km (94 mi) WNW of Sydney

Government
  - State electorate: Bathurst
  - Federal division: Calare
- Elevation: 894 m (2,933 ft)

Population
  - Total: 471 (2021)
- Postcode: 2790
- County: Australia
Localities around Lidsdale
Cullen Bullen	Wolgan Valley
Blackmans Flat	Lidsdale
Mount Lambie	Wallerawang	Marrangaroo

Lidsdale is a locality within the City of Lithgow Local Government Area of New South Wales, Australia. It lies to the north of Wallerawang. Its area, as defined for postal and statistical purposes, includes the historic locality of Kerosene Vale and the small rural areas known as Springvale and Angus Place. In 2021, its population was 471.

The area that later became known as Lidsdale lies close to the easternmost extent of the traditional lands of Wiradjuri people. There are culturally significant sites within the locality.

A village developed as a stopping place on the road to Mudgee during the gold rushes. It soon had at least two inns, the Carriers Arms and the Square and Compass Inn, also a livery stable and blacksmith's shop.

Coal mining began in the area, in 1893, when the Folly mine was opened by John Maddox, a son of the owner of the Carrier's Arms inn, Thomas Maddox. Coal mining still takes place in Lidsdale. There was also a short-lived oil shale mining, retorting and shale oil refining operation, in the part of the locality that was formerly known as Kerosene Vale, beginning in 1867.

Most of the settled area of the locality is in the mainly-cleared valley of Coxs River. At the southern end, is the small village, centred on Wolgan Road, which is now an area of mixed industrial and residential use. The southern boundary of the locality borders the site of the former Wallerawang Power Station. There are two coal mines, Angus Place mine (closed) and Springvale mine. There is a large ash dam and dry ash dump, in the part of the locality that was formerly known as Kerosene Vale. The locality extends north to the Wolgan Gap, the location where Wolgan Road descends into the Wolgan Valley, and to part of the valley's rim. An older route into the valley, known as Donkey Steps, also begins at Wolgan Gap. Most of the eastern part of the locality is forested and mountainous.

In the past, the village area in the south of the locality lay on the main road between Lithgow and Mudgee, which intersected Wolgan Road, but the Castlereagh Highway now bypasses it, where it runs across the south-western part of the locality. Part of the former Wallerawang Colliery Branch Railway ran through the locality and serviced the Angus Place mine. The Main Western railway line passes across the south-east part of the locality, in the area known as Springvale.

Lidsdale had a post office, which opened in 1871, originally as Wallerawang, and was renamed Lidsdale, in 1873, after another post office opened closer to the Wallerawang railway station and township. The existing building opened in 1912; it closed in November 1991, and subsequently has been converted to holiday accommodation. It had a school for most of the time between August 1870 and June 1936, and again January 1963 between May 1975; the school was known as Lidsdale only between 1900 and 1936 and otherwise mainly used the name Blackmans Flat.
