= Wallerawang railway station =

Historic site in New South Wales, Australia

Wallerawang
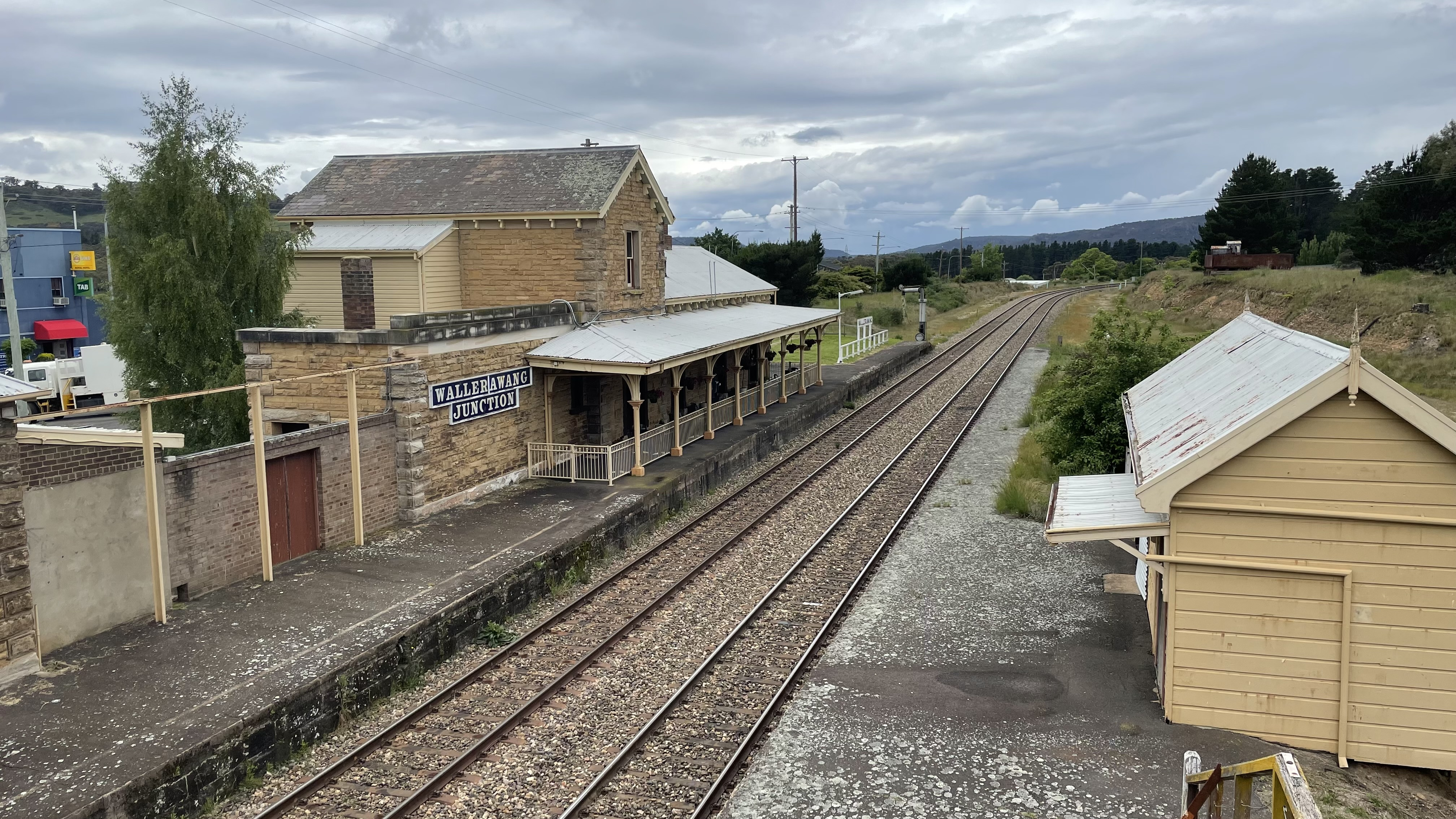

General information
- Location: Main Street, Wallerawang; Australia
- Coordinates: 33°24′28″S 150°04′05″E
- Elevation: 892 metres (2,928 ft) AHD
- Owner: Transport Asset Manager of New South Wales
- Operator: Sydney Trains
- Lines: Main Western; Gwabegar
- Distance: 171.3 km (106.4 mi) from Central
- Platforms: 2 (2 side)
- Tracks: 2

Construction
- Accessible: Yes

Other information
- Status: Opening December 2026

History
- Opened: 1 March 1870
- Closed: May 1989
- Rebuilt: December 2026
- Former names: Mudgee Road (1870–1873)

Services
Preceding station	Intercity Trains	Following station
Future services
Rydal towards Bathurst	Blue Mountains Line	Lithgow towards Central
Former services
Preceding station	Former services	Following station
Rydal towards Bourke	Main Western Line	Marrangaroo towards Sydney
Pipers Flat towards Gwabegar	Gwabegar Line	Terminus

New South Wales Heritage Register
- Official name: Wallerawang Railway Station and yard group
- Type: State heritage (complex / group)
- Designated: 2 April 1999
- Reference no.: 1282
- Type: Railway Platform/ Station
- Category: Transport – Rail
Location

Wallerawang railway station is a heritage-listed regional railway station located on the Main Western line in Wallerawang, the City of Lithgow, New South Wales, Australia. The property was added to the New South Wales State Heritage Register on 2 April 1999 as Wallerawang railway station and yard group.

== History ==
The station opened on 1 March 1870 as the terminus of the Main Western line when it was extended from Bowenfels. On 1 July 1870, the line was extended to Rydal. Originally opened as Mudgee Road, it was renamed Wallerawang in 1873.

In 1880, work commenced on the new rail line to Mudgee, the first stage of the Gwabegar line. Completed in May 1882, Wallerawang became a junction station from a junction 600 metres (2,000 ft) west of the station.

With the State Rail Authority replacing the Lithgow to Orange and Mudgee services with road coaches, the station closed in May 1989. Road coach services still call opposite the station.

On 24 October 2022, deputy premier Paul Toole announced that Wallerawang Station would be refurbished and reopened. As of August 2023, it was planned that Wallerawang would be a stop on the twice daily Bathurst Bullet service and on the Central West Express.

On 28 February 2025, the NSW Labor government announced that work was commencing to reopen the station in late 2026.

Service timetables for the reopening were not confirmed when construction work began but daily Bathurst Bullet and XPT services are expected to stop there.

== Description ==
The complex includes:

- Station buildings
  - platform 1 type 1, brick station/residence, 1870
  - platform 1 platform awning, 1883
  - platform 2 timber waiting shed, 1913
- Signal box
  - east, 1915
  - west, 1915
- Goods shed – 84 x 24 side shed corrugated iron, 1882
- Platform faces – stone and brick, 1870
- Pedestrian bridge to platform 2
- Water column up main
- Water tank – cast iron tank on metal base
- Jib crane – 1882
- Upper and lower quadrant signals
- Landscaping surrounding the station and yard area
- Enamel signs

== Heritage listing ==
As of 10 December 2002, Wallerawang station and yard group is a railway junction with a few examples of buildings from a range of periods, all in good condition and in use. The main station building is the best surviving example of a two-storey residence/station and a rare example in stone. The awning is an unusual one-off structure indicating the importance of the location with the need for additional shelter. The on-platform signal box is a rare surviving example of a large brick and timber box in good condition. The yard structures including the residences, goods shed and signal box are all good examples of various building types and remain as remnants of a larger facility. As a group the site has very high heritage significance.

Wallerawang railway station was listed on the New South Wales State Heritage Register on 2 April 1999 having satisfied the following criteria.

The place possesses uncommon, rare or endangered aspects of the cultural or natural history of New South Wales.

This item is assessed as historically rare. This item is assessed as scientifically rare. This item is assessed as arch. rare. This item is assessed as socially rare.

== See also ==
- List of disused railway stations in regional New South Wales
