= Donkey Steps =

Historic road in New South Wales, Australia

Coordinates: 33°18′51″S 150°06′51″E

Donkey Steps is a historic road, between Lidsdale and the Wolgan Valley, in the Blue Mountains of New South Wales, Australia. In 1897, it was superseded by Wolgan Road. It was reopened to strictly restricted vehicle traffic, in early 2023, following a major landslide that badly damaged the only other road into the valley. Including gradients of up to 35%, Donkey Steps is one of the steepest roads in Australia.

== Route ==
The route known as Donkey Steps lies to the east of the currently closed Wolgan Road, commencing at Wolgan Gap and rejoining Wolgan Road after the steepest part of the escarpment. In its original form, the route via Donkey Steps continued to the valley floor.

== History ==
The route of what is now known as the Donkey Steps lies on traditional land of Wirajuri people. Due to the topology of the Wolgan Valley, its sandstone cliffs, and the presence of Aboriginal heritage items in the area, it is apparent that Wiradjuri people had used a pathway through the Wolgan Gap to access the Wolgan Valley for thousands of years.

When colonial settlers took over the Wolgan Valley, the route became used by bullock teams and for moving livestock to and from the valley. The name, Donkey Steps, is said to be after an early settler's donkey. Charles Darwin visited the Wolgan Valley, on 19 January 1836, using Donkey Steps, then still a rough trail, to access the valley.

The route was surveyed, in March 1866, and a steep winding road was constructed. Even so, the difficulty of using the road was sufficient that some items were instead lowered on ropes from the sandstone cliffs of the valley. In 1897, Wolgan Road bypassed the steeper Donkey Steps.

Another old route into the Wolgan Valley, the Old Coach Road, was used during the construction of the oil shale works at Newnes and the long-abandoned Wolgan Valley railway. It is now a walking and cycling trail. The former trackbed of the railway is also now a walking track.

== Restricted reopening ==
The Black Summer bushfires of 2019-2020 badly damaged vegetation, causing instability on the steep slopes below Wolgan Gap. On 9 November 2022, Wolgan Road was damaged by a landslide, following torrential rain, leading to a decision to close the only road access to Wolgan Valley.

As an emergency measure, Donkey Steps was remediated, and it reopened as a road, on 1 February 2023. The road was officially opened, in May 2023. It is suitable only for four-wheel drive vehicles, and its use is restricted to residents of the Wolgan Valley and guest transfers to and from the Wolgan Valley Resort. Because it is a single-lane road, Donkey Steps is unidirectional, with the direction in use being controlled by traffic lights. Use during daylight hours is preferred and not recommended at night. Heavy vehicles are subject to further restrictions. Users must be in contact by UHF CB radio. When not in use, a gate at the top checkpoint is closed and locked.

Donkey Steps will remain a vehicle route, only until Wolgan Road reopens or an alternative route is constructed. It remained the only road access to the Wolgan Valley in June 2026.
