= Kerosene Vale =

Coordinates: 33°22′59″S 150°05′44″E

Kerosene Vale is a historic locality within the City of Lithgow Local Government Area of New South Wales, Australia. Kerosene Vale lies near Lidsdale and Wallerawang. It is considered part of Lidsdale for census purposes. It should not be confused with Hartley Vale, another locality with a history of shale oil production, which is also within the City of Lithgow. The name Kerosene Vale is now only used infrequently.

The area that later became known as Kerosene Vale lies close to the easternmost extent of the traditional lands of Wiradjuri people.

The site of the oil shale mine, retorting, and refining operation was south of Sawyers Swamp. Dr Walter Fawkes Mackenzie (1835-1886) applied for a Mineral Lease of 240ac there in 1866. Erection of the retorts began in early 1867. By mid-1867, Kerosene Vale Oil Works, owned by the Mackenzie brothers, was ready to commence operation.

The equipment and processes of the oil works were described as follows, in a newspaper article in the Sydney Mail of 1 June 1867, The works consisted of a steam engine and boiler, a sawmill and one bench of retorts, together with two 500-gallon wrought iron distillation stills that were heated by superheated steam. The equipment was made by the Newcastle Foundry. In the retorts, broken up torbanite was heated to dull-red heat for around eight hours, driving off the crude oil. The crude oil was then heated in one of the stills, and 'light oils' that were too flammable for lighting purposes were distilled off and stored in separate tanks. After treatment with acid or alkali to remove impurities, the remnant oil was separated into lubricating oils and 'parrafine' (kerosene) in the second still, with the remnant of that process being black pitch. The various oils were then packaged for market.

However, by the early-1870s, thicker outcrops of oil shale had been discovered. The oil works at Kerosene Vale were abandoned and another oil shale mine was opened at a nearby locality that was referred to as 'Bathgate', after the Scottish oil-producing town of Bathgate. 'Bathgate' also lay on Dr Mackenzie's property, about a mile from the Main Western railway line at the point where it passed through the original Marangaroo tunnel. The valley, by then known as Kerosene Vale, was rich river flat country and was being used for cattle grazing.

Kerosene Vale was a peaceful place, noted for its scenery, and was a popular picnic location until at least the late 1940s.

During the early 1950s, Kerosene Vale was the site of a short-lived open-cut colliery. The mine was part of a scheme of the Joint Coal Board, to modernise the coal industry by introducing mechanised mining techniques. The mine effectively closed in 1952, after a bizarre dispute between two rival coal mining companies.

The locality is the site of an ash dump that was used by the former Wallerawang Power Station, first in the form of a wet ash dam and later as a dry ash dump. Kerosene Vale has been extensively altered by open-cut mining waste and the power station ash dump, to such an extent that the locality is no longer agricultural, nor is it any longer noteworthy for its scenic beauty. The site of the old shale workings is now covered by the ash dam.
