= Cox's Road and Early Deviations - Sodwalls, Fish River Descent Precinct =

Historic road in New South Wales, Australia

Cox's Road and Early Deviations – Sodwalls, Fish River Descent Precinct
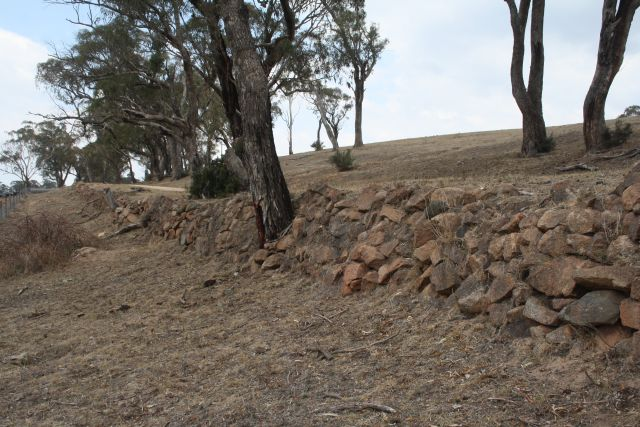

- Location within New South Wales Location within Australia
- 33°35′39″S 149°57′20″E
- Location: off Cuthill Road, Sodwalls, City of Lithgow, New South Wales, Australia

History
- Built: 1814–1815

Site notes
- Architect: William Cox

New South Wales Heritage Register
- Official name: Cox's Road and Early Deviations – Sodwalls, Fish River Descent Precinct; Coxs Road; Old Bathurst Road
- Type: State heritage (complex / group)
- Designated: 25 March 2015
- Reference no.: 1958
- Type: Road
- Category: Transport – Land
- Builders: William Cox; Convict Road Party

Cox's Road and Early Deviations – Sodwalls, Fish River Descent Precinct is a heritage-listed former colonial road and now road and access road at off Cuthill Road, Sodwalls in the City of Lithgow local government area of New South Wales, Australia. It was designed and built by William Cox from 1814 to 1815 with the support of a convict road party. It is also known as Coxs Road and Old Bathurst Road. It was added to the New South Wales State Heritage Register on 25 March 2015.

== History ==
The road from Emu Ford to Bathurst, a distance of 163.3 kilometres (101.5 mi) was completed in only six months during 1814 and 1815 by a working party composed mostly of convicts. Governor Lachlan Macquarie decided to have a carriage road constructed across the Blue Mountains, to the country which had been "newly discovered" by Europeans in 1813.

The so-called "First Crossing" of 1813 took place on the traditional lands of the Dharug, Gundungurra and Wiradjuri people. Other routes through the ridges and valleys of the Blue Mountains had been used by Aboriginal people for tens of thousands of years.

Cox was born in Wimborne Minster, Dorset in 1764. He married Rebecca Upjohn at Clerkenwell, London in 1789. Cox arrived in NSW on board the "Minerva" in January 1800. Cox became Chief Magistrate at Windsor in 1810 and in July 1814 Governor Macquarie made William Cox the Superintendent of the works for a new road over the Blue Mountains. His first wife died in 1819 and Cox married Anna Blachford in 1821. He died on 15 March 1837.

The Cox's Road Fish River Descent Precinct is situated about 8 kilometres (5.0 mi) south of Sodwalls. Cox selected a line towards the Fish River around 18 December 1814 after having previously ridden over the country west of Mount Blaxland. His Journal records:

Sunday, 18 December: At 1/2 past 7 went forward on horseback to examine the road from hence to the Fish River. Found the country still continues very hilly and rocky in many places. There are also two other small bridges to make before we arrive there. Took Mr. Hobby, John Tye and three others with me. Caught some fish and dined on the banks of the river. Fixed on the road except going up one hill which must be avoided if possible. Returned at 6 p.m. It being a clear, fine day we had fine views to the northward and westward from a high hill. Saw some plains without timber to the west, but in general the whole country around is extremely hilly and apparently fair grazing land. Richard Lewis brought the bullocks forward to us this day.

On 24 December Cox "went forward this afternoon to ascertain if I could get my caravan with safety to the Fish River", and gave orders "to strike tents and pack up in the morning". On 25 December (Christmas Day) he "went forward to the Fish River and removed our caravan and one cartload there, where I pitched my tent leaving behind 3 bridges to make and five miles of road." As it was Christmas Day, Cox also issued the men in the road party with a gill of spirits each and a new shirt.

By 29 December there were six men preparing material for the bridge across the Fish River, and the rest were presumably completing the road towards it. In early January the road party continued to draw and split logs and were building piers for the bridge which was finished on 5 January 1815. Cox described the Fish River bridge as follows:

'It is strong and well built; on each end is a pier of 25 feet long which is well filled up with stone and a very little earth over it. The arch or span across is then 25 feet more, which is planked with split logs, and as floods will go over it there is no earth put on it. It is altogether 75 feet long and 16 wide'.

The Fish River area was another steep obstacle on the Bathurst Road which was commented upon by many for travellers who found the Fish River Hill ascent on the west side particularly difficult. In April 1817 botanist Allan Cunningham described the journey over the Clarence Hilly Range to the Fish River as "severe and oppressive to our horses, the whole being sharp lofty hills and narrow boggy valleys, alternately", but he also reported that alterations were being made to improve the gradient.

Cunningham's Journal for 3 August 1817 described this section as follows:

'The journey over Clarence's Hilly Range, which is notorious for its difficulties when passing with loaded carts is at this period being made more easy for man and beast. NSW Government men are forming a new line of road in places where the ascents and descents were short and steep or the bottoms formed by the waters of the range had become stagnant and boggy. The new road is generally formed round a rising point when it is safe and practicable--in place of the old one running over its summit--so that the great horse pulls are in great measure eased, and the swampy parts have drains cut to let off the waters that formerly were obliged to remain for want of a declivity to carry them off.'

On the west side of the Fish River the climb up the steep Fish River Hill (elevation 1,024 metres (3,360 ft) AHD) was remarked upon by numerous travellers as difficult. In 1827 William Dumaresq called it "the worst hill from Sydney to Bathurst". He also noted that the old bridge had been washed away so it was necessary to ford the river and also mentioned that a convict road party was stationed there, presumably carrying out improvements to the Bathurst Road.

== Description ==
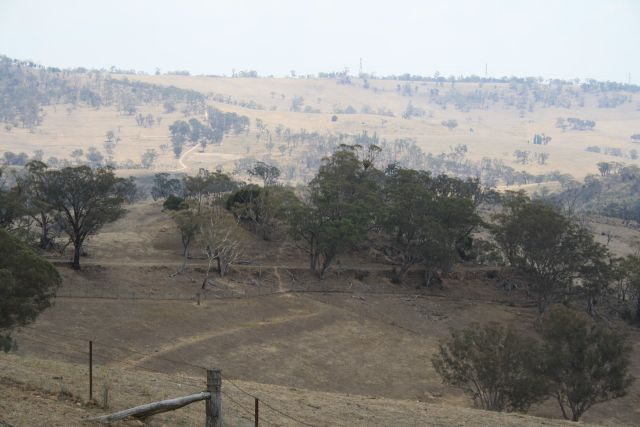
Road through the hills

William Cox had been instructed by Governor Macquarie only to open a rough cart road, so that the new lands found in the western plains would be symbolically open. The road from Emu Ford to Bathurst, a distance of 163.3 kilometres (101.5 mi) was completed in only six months. Macquarie's instructions specified that the road should be at least 3.7 metres (12 ft) wide in order that two carts would be able to pass each other, and that the timber should be cleared on each side so that the road corridor was 6.1 metres (20 ft) wide. Stumps were to be grubbed out and any holes should be filled in. The surviving physical evidence shows relatively few locations where the extant road conforms with the dimensions specified in the instructions.

Cut Hill Road, which is a part of the 1814 Cox's Road which has been resurfaced and upgraded as a local road, ends at Pitt's Corner where it joins Jerrys Meadows Road about 8 kilometres (5.0 mi) south of Sodwalls. A reserved Crown Road identified as the Old Bathurst Road, continues west towards the Fish River and again, the general line is followed by a modern unsealed road which provides access to nearby farming properties.

As with the preceding sections of the "Old Bathurst Road" there is more than one road line through this area. Three consecutive roads were identified by Karskens in 1988. Therefore, the actual Cox's road crosses in and out of private property. The earliest line is on the top of the ridge before dropping down to the river in a formation with shallow cuttings. Again the most obvious and substantial physical evidence in this area relates to much later 1820s lines and improvements, including long sections of walling which support an embanked road formation winding down the hillsides.

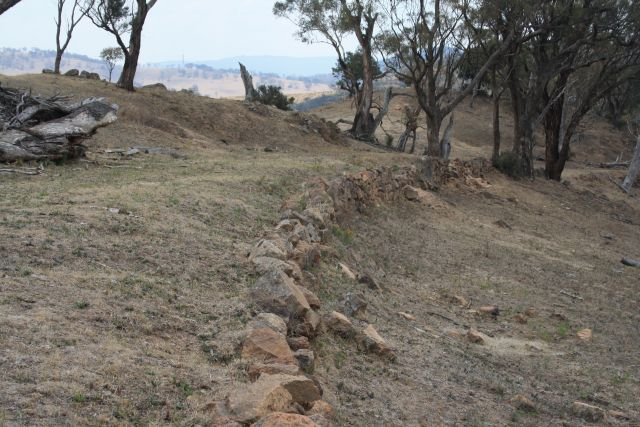
Rocks mark the edge of the road

The original line of Cox's Road followed the Crown Road now used as access to the farming properties "Clover Downs" and "Ambervale". It appears mainly as a widened, graded and cut road. From the "Ambervale" gate it appears to be less well used and in more original condition becoming a deeply eroded trench lined by trees left standing along the route to the river. At approximately 1.5 kilometres (0.93 mi) east of the Fish River the road diverges; Cox' s road runs along the ridge as a faint unmade track, then descends steeply downhill. A later section of road, to the north, is cut along the side slopes and embanked to provide a road 6 kilometres (3.7 mi) wide and of easier gradient. It is supported by an extensive convict-built retaining wall which winds down the mountainside to the river. The walling ranges between 30 centimetres (12 in) and 2 metres (6 ft 7 in) in height. Construction is mainly un-coursed rubble work with the variation in the size of the stones used. It is very similar to the work on the zig-zag and other parts of the Mount Blaxland Precinct.

It is likely that the convict road gang reported to be stationed at the Fish River in late 1826 may have been responsible for the extensive walling which supports the road that winds down the mountainside to the Fish River. There are no equivalent improvements on the western side of the river, and this may be explained by the fact that from 1827 onwards it was becoming evident that efforts would be made to find and build a completely new line of road to Bathurst.

Between this substantial 1820s road and Cox's 1814 track there appears to be another road simply cut out of the hill on one side, with a flat surface. This may be the intermediate attempt to improve the road in 1817 as mentioned by Cunningham.

According to McBrien' s survey in 1823, Cox's road continued south of the present reserved Crown Road down to the river. The line of timber follows the Crown road, there are shallow cuttings, and the indentation of the old road is still visible.

At Fish River, Cox built the second longest of his bridges which was completed on 5 January 1815. The Journal notes that the bridge was 4.9 metres (16 ft) wide, and had a 7.6-metre (25 ft) span with two 7.6-metre (25 ft) "piers" filled with stone at either end, making a total length of 23 metres (75 ft). Only the Bluff Bridge at Linden was longer. Cox described the bridge as "a strong and well-built one" but also noted that "floods will go over it" and no trace of what must have been an impressive structure survives today.

In 1988 Karskens also described the Fish River Crossing: "The banks of the Fish River show no trace of Cox" s 7.6-metre long (25 ft) bridge with stone-filled approaches. Severe floods washed away the structure and its successors. The banks today are covered with tussock grass and on the west with river stones and pebbles. There is a slightly raised mound of road-width on the eastern bank which may have been the approach to the ford.'

West of the Fish River crossing the general line of Cox's Road is followed by an unsealed dirt road which winds back and forth to ascend the hill. There have clearly been some deviations and the modern road has obviously been re-cut and re-graded over time. The section west of the Fish River is not included in the Fish River Descent Precinct.

The State Heritage Register listing of Cox's Road and Early Deviations includes six precincts of Cox's Road:

- Cox's Road and Early Deviations – Linden, Linden Precinct – HC Plan 2639
- Cox's Road and Early Deviations – Woodford, Old Bathurst Road Precinct – HC Plan 2640
- Cox's Road and Early Deviations – Woodford, Appian Way Precinct – HC Plan 2641
- Cox's Road and Early Deviations – Mount York, Cox's Pass Precinct – HC Plan 2642
- Cox's Road and Early Deviations – Hartley, Clarence Hilly Range / Mount Blaxland Precinct – HC Plan 2643
- Cox's Road and Early Deviations – Sodwalls, Fish River Descent Precinct – HC Plan 2644

=== Condition ===
As at 1 December 2014, the road is substantially intact. Numerous features from the upgrading and realignment of Cox's Road in the 1820s are evident including road side retaining walls and cuttings. Within Lot 4, DP 1132182 evidence of another road formation cut into the slope of the hillside is also clearly visible. The road is substantially intact. Numerous features from the upgrading and realignment of Cox's Road in the 1820s are evident.

== Heritage listing ==
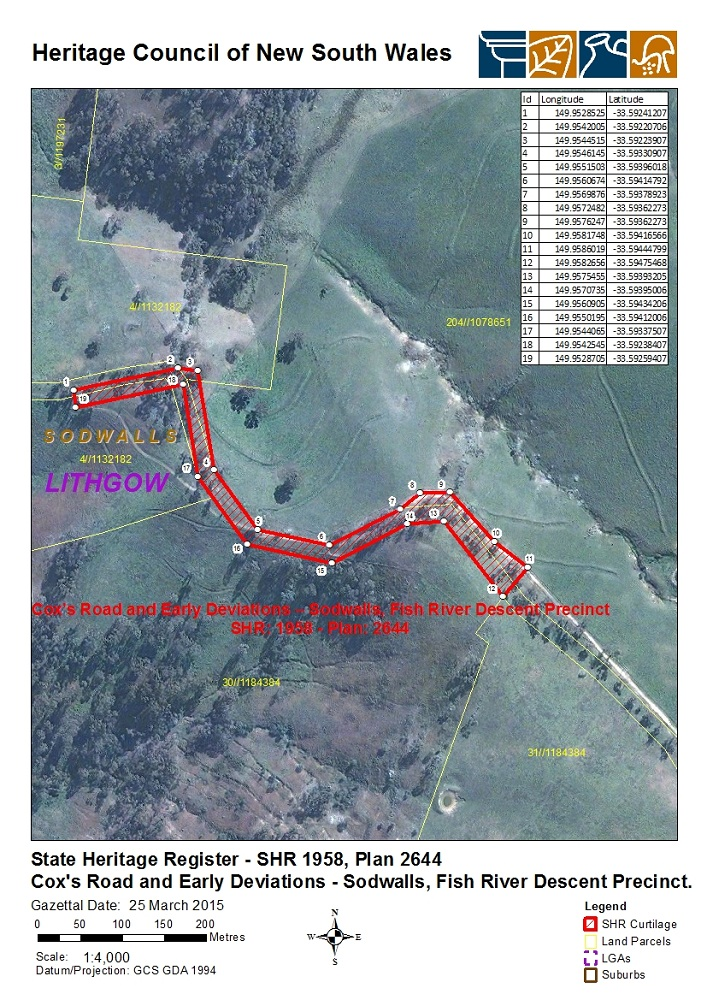
Heritage boundaries show the route of the road

As at 10 November 2014, the surviving remnants of Cox's Road, built 1814 to 1815, have state significance as the earliest road across the Blue Mountains and the first structure built by Europeans west of the Blue Mountains. Building of this road followed from the prior exploration by Gregory Blaxland, William Lawson and William Wentworth, and the survey by George Evans. The successful construction of the road was symbolic of the conquest of the natural barrier created by the Blue Mountains, and represented Governor Macquarie's vision for the ongoing development of the colony beyond Sydney and its immediate surrounds. Cox's Road enabled the later opening of the hinterland beyond the Blue Mountains for subsequent settlement, pastoral and agricultural expansion, which then escalated the dispossession of Aboriginal peoples from their lands.

William Cox was well known among convicts for his power to recommend pardons and tickets of leave. Most of the convicts who volunteered for the work to open a track to the interior were emancipated, receiving Pardons or Tickets of Leave on completion of the work.

The surviving road fabric demonstrates the crude and hurried nature of Cox's work, and the techniques used in tracing, cutting and forming the road. In conjunction with later colonial road alignments on the mountains and elsewhere, Cox's Road also forms part of a suite of roads demonstrating the wide range of road building styles and standards employed during the colonial period.

Cox's Road and Early Deviations – Sodwalls, Fish River Descent Precinct was listed on the New South Wales State Heritage Register on 25 March 2015 having satisfied the following criteria.

The place is important in demonstrating the course, or pattern, of cultural or natural history in New South Wales.

Surviving remnants of Cox's Road have state historical significance as physical evidence of the first road constructed across the Blue Mountains from Emu Plains to the Bathurst Plains (1814–15). Constructed in 1814–15 Cox's Road is one of the earliest Colonial-era road-lines surviving in Australia. The 1814 road is tangible evidence of the development of the colony at Sydney and of the expansion of white settlement into western NSW. The road symbolises the occupation of the country and Governor Macquarie's aspirations for the eventual opening of the interior to European settlement after the discovery of the Western plains by G. W. Evans in 1814. In this respect the 1814–1815 Cox's Road has considerable symbolic significance as an official public work which laid the foundations for future development. Cox's Road is linked with the foundation of Bathurst, the first inland settlement in NSW, which was proclaimed by Governor Macquarie on 7 May 1815 after his journey along the road.

The place has a strong or special association with a person, or group of persons, of importance of cultural or natural history of New South Wales's history.

The surviving remnants of Cox's Road have state significance for their close association with Governor Lachlan Macquarie who commissioned the building of the road into the interior, and with the magistrate and ex-army officer Captain William Cox, who supervised the building of the road. The road is also associated with the convicts who laboured on the road to obtain their liberty, and with the officers and men who assisted Cox such as Thomas Hobby, Richard Lewis, John Tighe and Samuel Ayres. The crossing of the Blue Mountains, the surveying of a route to Bathurst and the building of Cox's Road were significant events in the period of Macquarie's governorship. Governor Macquarie's view of the importance of the road is demonstrated by his reports to Earl Bathurst, the British Secretary of State for War and the Colonies, and by his journey to the Bathurst Plains immediately after its construction, where he proclaimed the site for the Bathurst township.

William Cox's achievement using a small group of convict men in a short period of time and with no loss of life caused by road-making or other substantial difficulties, was reflective of his reputation as a more humane employer and magistrate than many of his contemporaries. The leadership qualities, vision and skill he showed constructing the road would also be evident in later government contracts won by Cox for other public works.

The place is important in demonstrating aesthetic characteristics and/or a high degree of creative or technical achievement in New South Wales.

The surviving precincts of Cox's Road have state technical significance for their ability to demonstrate simple, pre 1820s road building techniques. Improvement of the 1814 route throughout the 1820s also provide important evidence of later road building techniques and demonstrates the ongoing use of this key route to the interior, before it was superseded by the new Great Western Road laid out by Sir Thomas Mitchell in the 1830s.

The Fish River Descent Precinct illustrates Cox's 1814–15 road and the way it was modified and improved, until it became superseded by new road lines after 1830. This precinct provides an excellent example of the progress made in road building between 1815 and c. 1826, as three roads of progressively larger scale and sophistication still lie alongside one another. They illustrate the typical growth of a road from a rudimentary track to a "made " road, both in survey, location and construction. The original line of Cox's Road runs along the summit of the ridge, while less precipitous sections have been built on the slope below, the lowest of these with a long section of substantial convict-built retaining wall probably completed by a road gang stationed at Fish River in 1826.

The place has a strong or special association with a particular community or cultural group in New South Wales for social, cultural or spiritual reasons.

Cox's Road and its remnants are demonstrated as having social significance at a state level by the substantial interest in identifying and promoting Cox's Road for cultural tourism and education, and celebrating the bicentenary of the road by the general public, state and local government bodies and a range of community organisations. The road is of particular importance to Cox descendants. The William Cox Fellowship first nominated sections of Cox's Road for heritage listing in the 1980s.

The place has potential to yield information that will contribute to an understanding of the cultural or natural history of New South Wales.

Precincts of Cox's Road have research significance at a state level for their ability to demonstrate early nineteenth century road, culvert and bridge building techniques using basic skills and technologies. The remains of the 1814–15 road illustrate the conditions of the period and contribute to an understanding of the process of exploration and development, and of early colonial road building and road use. The remains represent a major physical, technological and engineering achievement and exhibit fine details of workmanship. Several precincts of the 1814–15 road have specific archaeological potential.

The place possesses uncommon, rare or endangered aspects of the cultural or natural history of New South Wales.

Surviving precincts of the 1814–1815 Cox's Road from Penrith to Bathurst are rare examples of early Colonial road building in NSW. The surviving remnants of Cox's Road have state significance as a rare example of pre 1820 road building based on the use of manual and primitive tools, and predating the more sophisticated road survey and construction techniques employed on the later "Great Roads" of the 1820s and 1830s.

== See also ==
- Cox's Road and Early Deviations – Hartley, Clarence Hilly Range and Mount Blaxland Precinct
- Cox's Road and Early Deviations – Linden, Linden Precinct
- Cox's Road and Early Deviations – Mount York, Cox's Pass Precinct
- Cox's Road and Early Deviations – Woodford, Appian Way Precinct
- Cox's Road and Early Deviations – Woodford, Old Bathurst Road Precinct
- Convicts in Australia
