= Sodwalls, New South Wales =

Sodwalls
- Coordinates: 33°30′56″S 149°59′42″E
- Country: Australia
- State: New South Wales
- LGA: City of Lithgow
- Location: 150 km (93 mi) W of Sydney; 45 km (28 mi) E of Bathurst; 16 km (9.9 mi) W of Lithgow

Government
  - State electorate: Bathurst
  - Federal division: Calare
- Elevation: 925 m (3,035 ft)

Population
  - Total: 94 (SAL 2021)
- Postcode: 2790

Sodwalls is a small hamlet in New South Wales, Australia

Sodwalls is located about 150 kilometres (93 mi) west of the state capital, Sydney and 16 kilometres (10 mi) south-west of the city of Lithgow.

The local tourist association claims that "between 1827 and 1829 a sod walls house with grass-thatched roof was built for troopers on Major Lockyers Road and called ‘Sodwalls.’"

Sodwalls used to have a railway station on the Main Western Railway. This line is used by the Central West XPT service from Sydney to Dubbo with stops at Rydal to the east and Tarana to the west.

Theresa (Cissie) McLaughlin, a Catholic nun who was superior of Our Lady's Nurses for the Poor in Sydney, was born in Sodwalls in 1890.

== Heritage listings ==
Sodwalls has a number of heritage-listed sites, including:

- off Cuthill Road: Cox's Road and Early Deviations - Sodwalls, Fish River Descent Precinct

Preceding station	Former services	Following station
Tarana towards Bourke	Main Western Line	Rydal towards Sydney
