= Rydal, New South Wales =

Rydal
- Town
- Coordinates: 33°29′34″S 150°02′13″E
- Country: Australia
- State: New South Wales
- LGA: City of Lithgow
- Location: 154 km (96 mi) W of Sydney; 50 km (31 mi) E of Bathurst; 22 km (14 mi) W of Lithgow

Government
  - State electorate: Bathurst
  - Federal division: Calare
- Elevation: 957 m (3,140 ft)

Population
  - Total: 163 (2021 census)
- Postcode: 2790
- Annual rainfall: 797.5 mm (31.40 in)

Rydal is a small rural village in New South Wales, Australia.

Rydal is located about 154 kilometres (96 mi) west of the state capital, Sydney and 22 kilometres (14 mi) west from the city of Lithgow about 6 km off the Great Western Highway.

The Main Western Railway line passes through Rydal. Rydal station is serviced by daily Transport NSW train services to and from Sydney and Bathurst, as well as the Dubbo XPT passenger service. First settled in the 1820s, Rydal was located on Major Mitchell's main road to Bathurst, and was a busy village through the mid-1800s and early 1900s. The Great Western Highway by-passed Rydal in 1929.

There is a hotel/pub, providing accommodation, meals and coffees, and open over the weekend, but no other shops. Closest shops and fuel are at Wallerawang (12 km). Accommodation is also available at a number of bed and breakfast establishments. There is a public pay telephone. Only Telstra mobile works reliably in the village.

Rydal has a NSW Rural Fire Service volunteer-run station, attending fires and motor vehicle accidents as well as bush fires.

The Rydal Agricultural and Horticultural Show is held at the Rydal Showgrounds on the first weekend of February, on the Saturday. There is plenty of entertainment for all ages. The Equestrian events are a big drawcard, as well as displays of local produce, art, photography and cooking. It is known as the "Biggest Little Show in The West".

Daffodils at Rydal is a garden festival centered on Rydal's main street, gardens and parks, as well as open gardens in the nearby area. Held on the second weekend and third weekend of September the festival raises funds for charities. Always plenty to see and do with thousands of daffodils planted throughout the district.

Four wheel driving, trail biking and motor biking is popular in the nearby Lidsdale State Forest and Marrangaroo National Park, and fishing in the nearby Coxs River and Lake Lyell. Rydal Village Association have provided some pleasant parks for picnics, and a heritage walk past some of the historic buildings and points of interest. The Association is currently pushing Lithgow Council to provide public toilet facilities for visitors, otherwise if the hotel is open there are toilets available.

At the 2006 census, Rydal had a population of 609, but only about 50 people live in the village.

== Heritage listings ==
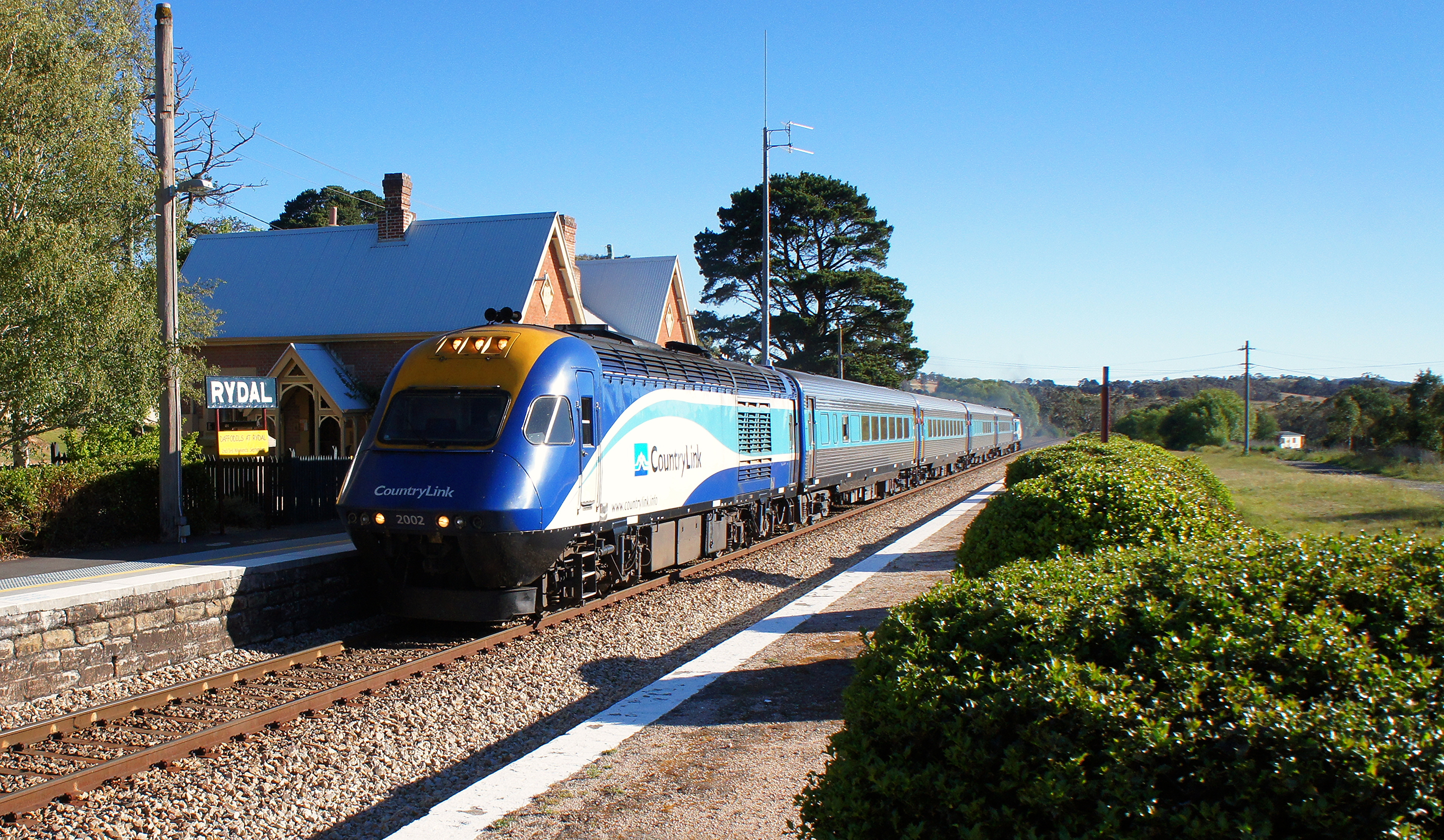
XPT at Rydal station

Rydal has a number of heritage-listed sites, including:

- Main Western railway line: Rydal railway station
- Main Western railway line: Rydal rail underbridges

== See also ==
- Rydal Dam
- Rydal railway station
