= Lithgow railway station =

Railway station in New South Wales, Australia

Lithgow
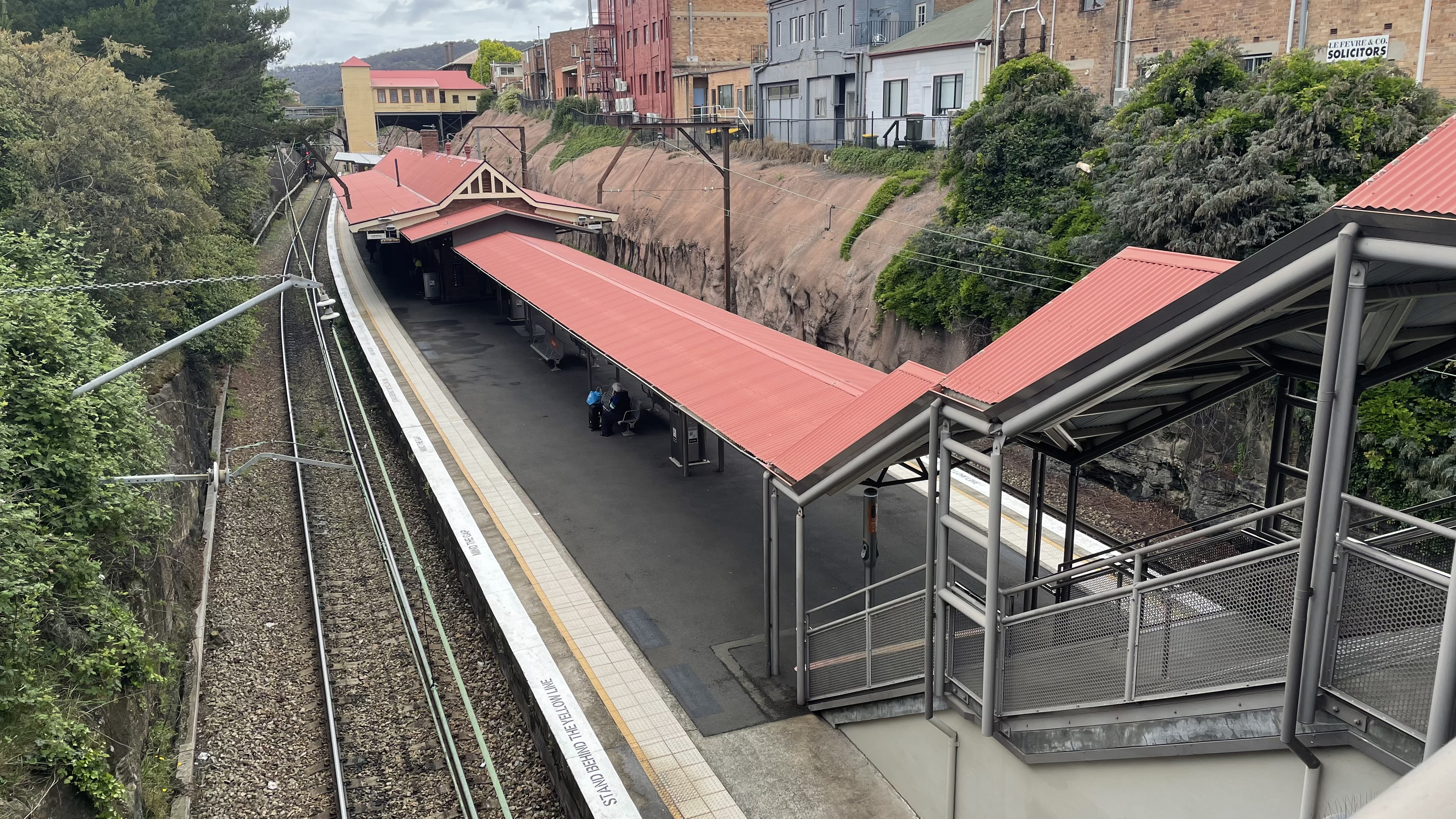
- North-east bound view of the station platforms, November 2021

General information
- Location: Main Street, Lithgow; Australia
- Coordinates: 33°28′50″S 150°09′27″E
- Elevation: 917 metres (3,009 ft)
- Owner: Transport Asset Manager of New South Wales
- Line: Main Western
- Distance: 152.8 kilometres (94.9 mi) from Sydney Central
- Platforms: 2 (1 island)
- Tracks: 2
- Train operators: Sydney Trains; NSW TrainLink
- Bus routes: 2
- Bus stands: 3
- Bus operators: Lithgow Buslines
- Connections: Buses; Coaches; School Buses

Construction
- Structure type: Ground
- Parking: Yes
- Cycle facilities: Yes (limited)
- Accessible: Yes
- Architectural style: Federation

Other information
- Status: Staffed
- Station code: LTH
- Website: Transport for NSW

History
- Opened: 9 March 1925
- Electrified: 1957

Passengers
- 2025: 131,595 (year); 361 (daily) (Sydney Trains, NSW TrainLink)

Services
Preceding station	Intercity Trains	Following station
Terminus	Blue Mountains Line	Zig Zag towards Central
Terminus	Blue Mountains Line Limited express	Bell towards Central
Rydal towards Bathurst	Blue Mountains Line (4 daily services) Bathurst Bullet	Mount Victoria towards Central
Rydal towards Bathurst	Blue Mountains Line (8 daily services) Bathurst Shuttle	Terminus
Preceding station	NSW TrainLink	Following station
Rydal towards Dubbo	NSW TrainLink Western Line Dubbo XPT	Katoomba towards Sydney
Bathurst towards Broken Hill	NSW TrainLink Western Line Broken Hill Outback Xplorer	Katoomba towards Sydney

New South Wales Heritage Register
- Official name: Lithgow Railway Station Group and Residence; Eskbank East
- Type: State heritage (built)
- Designated: 30 August 2013
- Reference no.: 1833
- Type: Railway Platform / Station
- Category: Transport – Rail
- Builders: New South Wales Government Railways
Location

Lithgow railway station is a heritage-listed former station master's residence and railway station located on the Main Western line at Railway Parade, Lithgow, City of Lithgow, New South Wales, Australia. It was designed and built by New South Wales Government Railways and built from 1924 to 1925. It is also known as Lithgow Railway Station Group and Residence and Eskbank East. The property was added to the New South Wales State Heritage Register on 30 August 2013. The station has frequent NSW TrainLink services running to and from Sydney Central.

== History ==
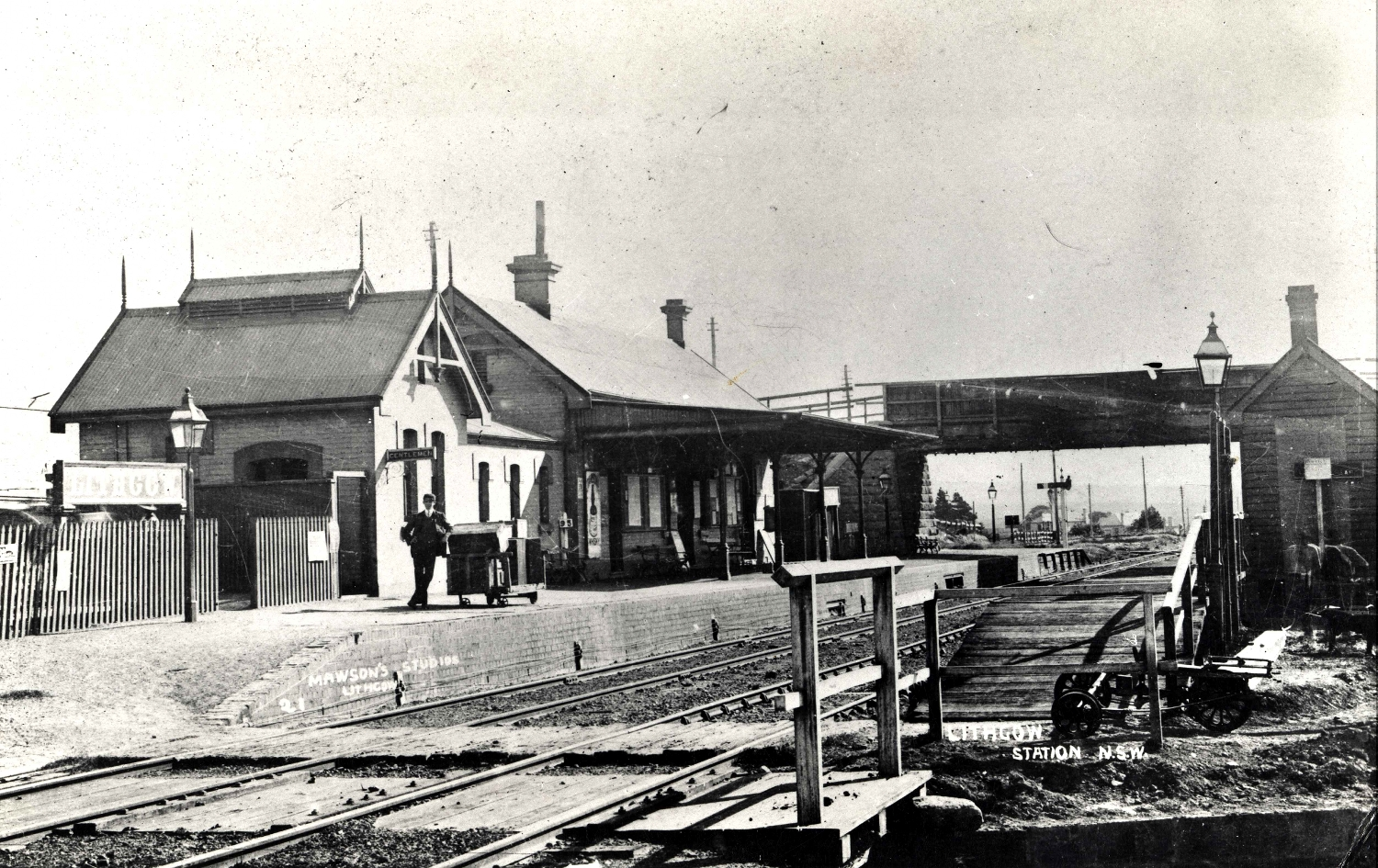
The first Lithgow station.

With the completion of the Lithgow Zig Zag in 1869, the Western railway's terminus moved from Mount Victoria to Bowenfels, signifying the successful crossing of the Blue Mountains. Whilst the railway would continue west, Lithgow proved to be an important destination in itself due to coal and iron ore deposits. The line opened in 1869 but there was no station for Lithgow until 1877. The first station at Lithgow was located 430 metres (1,410 ft) east of the present site in June 1877. The former 1877 railway platform is still extant. The line was duplicated in 1880.

In the first half of the 1920s, it was decided to expand Lithgow as a regional headquarters for the NSW Railways. Apart from the new large locomotive depot, the Railways selected a new site west of Eskbank station for the development of a new passenger station to replace Eskbank Station, which remains but is unused.

Like most stations between Emu Plains and Lithgow, Lithgow received a standard Federation style set of two platform structures, a main face brick building and a detached brick "out-of" shed. There was also a footwarmer shed on the western end of the platform. The new station site featured two new buildings, both opened on 9 March 1925. The first was a timber booking and parcels office elevated on a steel beam frame with a concrete deck that was located adjacent to Eskbank Street. Access from this entry point was by a ramp and stepway to the island platform. One unusual feature was the installation of a lift for staff use only to handle baggage, parcels and "out-ofs".

It is assumed that the dry stone retaining wall is associated with the adjacent remnant concrete pedestrian ramp and therefore the original construction of the railway station.

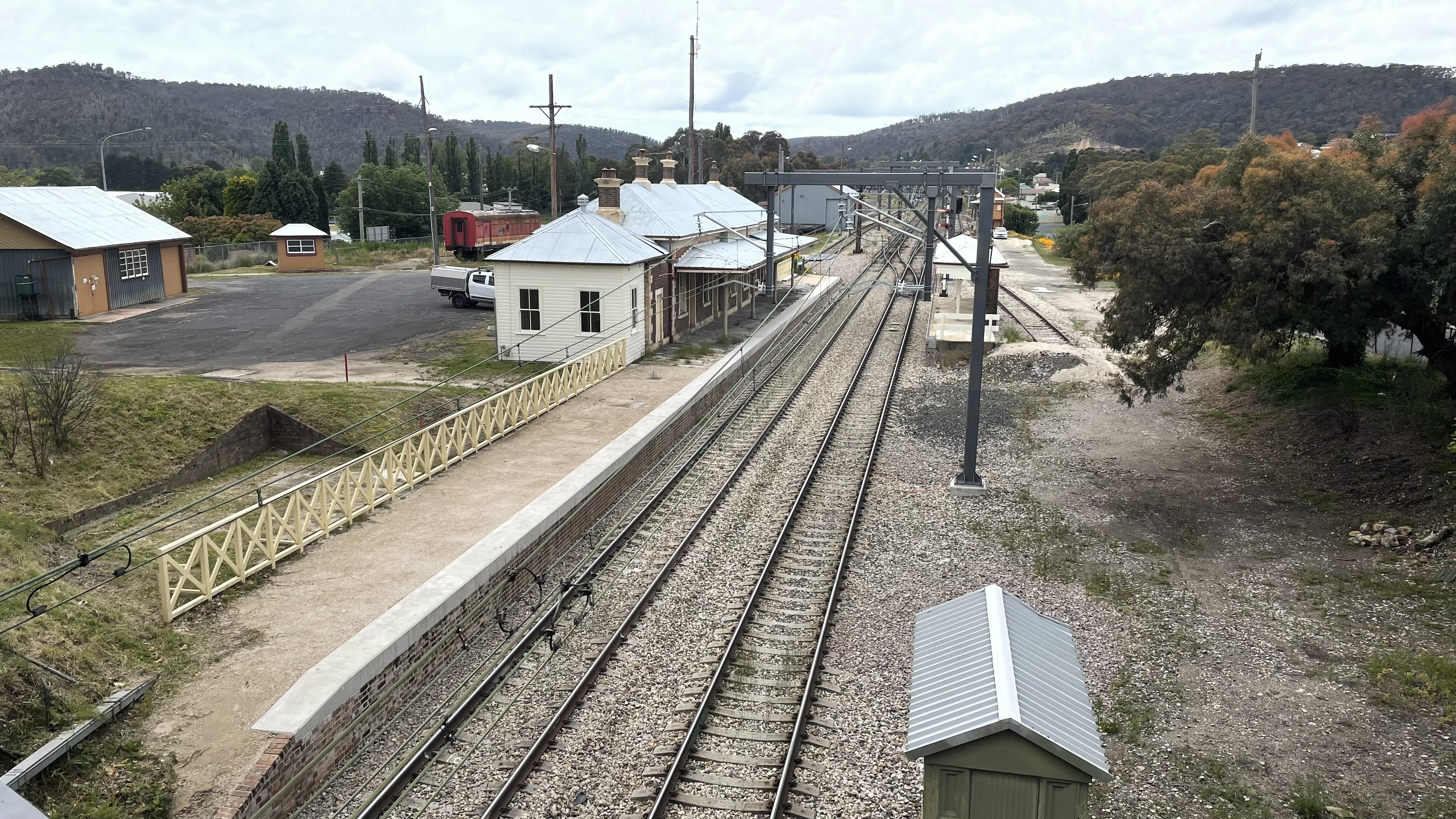
Eskbank Station, superseded by the first Lithgow station, which was in turn superseded by the current (1925) Lithgow station

A two-storey face brick office building for train controller and western communications was constructed at 12 Railway Parade at the corner of Railway Parade and Eskbank Street in 1954–56, and is still in use in 2009. In 1957 the line was electrified through Lithgow to Bowenfels, but Lithgow is the present limit of electric operations.

In 1961, the last traditional Railway Refreshment Room was built and opened in the Sydney end of the building, following the closure of a similar facility at Mount Victoria. The refreshment room closed in July 1990, being the last example in the state.

The station exit was originally located on the footbridge at the eastern end of the platform until replaced by the present concourse in August 1991. The overhead station offices and footbridge were constructed in c. 1993 and access has been relocated to the western end of the station.

== Description ==
=== Landscape features ===
The setting of the station within a relatively steep rock cutting provides a distinctive landscape presentation to Lithgow Railway Station. The northern embankment has been sealed with shotcrete and the same material has been used partway along the southern embankment. The exposed embankment surface is a friable composition of shale, rubble and soils. Removal of vegetation has revealed a dry stone wall of roughly shaped sandstone blocks set near to the top of the southern embankment, extending from the overhead footbridge for approximately 20 metres (66 ft) with a height ranging form 0.5–2 metres (1 ft 8 in – 6 ft 7 in) to the concrete ramp. Proximity to the ramp indicates the wall is an integral element of the original station construction. A "path" or bed for the concrete ramp runs across the embankment in front of the wall.

Apart from a couple of garden beds with shrubs (clipped into spheres and rounded shapes) and a small planting of annuals (traditionally) and hardy soft-wooded perennials (again, tightly clipped into shapes) along the eastern portion of the island platform there is no other landscaping at the station. The existing landscaping is not considered significant but contributes to the setting and character of the place and continues a tradition of railway gardening on this site for some time.

=== Structures and buildings ===
The heritage-listed complex comprises:

- Island platform – brick-faced (1925)
- Old Station Platform – levelled rock face (1877)
- Eskbank Street Overbridge (1924)
- Station Building – type 11, island-building, brick (1925)
- Former Booking/Parcels office & Goods lift tower – timber (1925)
- Station Master's residence – 6 Railway Parade (c.1880)
- Hayley Street Footbridge and Overhead Booking Office (1993)

==== Island platform, erect 1925 ====
Lithgow station is a typical island platform, curving slightly along the Up end. The platform is brick faced with concrete deck and asphalt finish. Modern light fittings, illuminated signage, timber bench seating, small planters, and a central garden bed (which appears to be the former location of the access ramp/stairs from Eskbank Street) comprise the platform furnishings. The platform is set within the rock cutting lower than the adjoining street levels and accessed from the western end via concrete stairs and U-shaped tube-like ramps leading to the footbridge linking the station to both Railway Parade and Main Street. A contemporary canopy provides weather protection between the station building and the footbridge through the stairs.

==== Hayley Street Footbridge and booking office, erected 1993 ====
Above Lithgow Station in 2026, with a coach in the background.

The Hayley Street Footbridge is a modern concrete deck footbridge suspended over steel beam and trestles over the station platform and the railway tracks to both side streets leading to the bus interchange on Railway Parade. It has a simple arrangement with the Station Master's office and the booking office on the northern half featuring a gabled corrugated metal roof with a small series of skylights. The remainder of the footbridge is covered with the same roof with no skylights and features steel pipe-rail balustrades with glazed enclosures. It is linked to the platform by the tube-like ramp and the stairs. A lift tower is located at the ramp entrance of the footbridge. The footbridge, overhead booking office and Station Master's office are typical of modern structures with simple detailing and no architectural merit. Excluded from listing.

==== Old Station platform, erected 1877 ====
This former platform is evidence of the first Lithgow Station and is a levelled railway platform over the rock cutting. It is located further to the west of the present station at the southern foundation of the Sandford Avenue overbridge. Access to the redundant platform was not available for close inspection. The former station building no longer exists.

==== Esbank Street over bridge, erected c. 1924 ====
Two rendered segmental arch spandrels with rock cliff abutments on both sides of the former overhead booking/parcels office structure.

==== Station building, erected 1925 and extended 1961 ====
External: Constructed of face brick with a corrugated metal gabled roof extending as an awning to both platforms, the Lithgow station building is an island platform building in standard "A10" Federation style design. It features ten bays with a linear arrangement along with the platform with tuckpointed brickwork and engaged piers between the bays. The eastern (Up) end of the building has been extended approximately one bay in 1961 (formerly used as Railway Refreshment Room) with a matching gable end detailing featuring large metal box-framed window openings supported on with brick brackets with security mesh and a single door with side windows and fanlight on the east side. A narrow awning provides protection over this door. Other features to the original bays of the building include standard iron brackets over decorative corbels supporting the ample platform awnings, fretted timber work to both ends of the awnings, timber-framed double-hung vertically proportioned windows with multi-paned upper sashes, timber panelled doors with multi-paned fanlights, and a brick chimney with corbelled top and modern roof vents to toilets. The wall-mounted clock on the No.1 platform next to the Station Master's office appears original. Windows on the platform elevations of the two most eastern bays have been enlarged and covered by security mesh or grills. Another single door with windows on each side is also located on the west end of the building and provides access to the gent's toilets. There is a modern canopy extension at the western end of the station building, where the new platform canopy extends from the footbridge stairs access to the station.

Internal: Although the station building generally appears intact externally its internal room layouts and divisions have been modified. The original floor layout included (from west to east) an SM's office, telegraph office, general waiting room, ladies room & lavatory, store and gent's room. The current floor layout consists of a locked room, SM's office, waiting room, ladies toilets, staff meal room and gent's toilets. Apart from the toilets and the waiting room the rest of the rooms are kept locked. The interiors have been refurbished with only plasterboard ceiling panelling, simple moulded cornices and high wall vents appear to remain from the original phase. The floors are tiled.

==== Former book / Parcels office and goods lift tower, erected in 1925 ====
External: The former booking office is located on the western side of the Eskbank Street overhead bridge at the Up end of the station. Constructed of timber with weatherboard cladding the building is now partially utilised as ladies waiting room and public toilets. It is elevated on a steel beam and trestles structure with a concrete deck and adjoins the arched road overbridge on the eastern side. The former booking/parcels office also adjoins the timber goods lift tower on the north side. The street elevation of the building has been faced with a brick wall and a flat awning along the street frontage. A timber panelled balustrade with artwork reflecting a coal mining theme completes the remaining portion of the overhead bridge on the north side of the tower. The door and windows on the street elevations are of later modifications with metal frames and security mesh. The large gates to the former parcels office and the goods lift have been blocked with metal panels. The original timber-framed double-hung windows with multi-paned upper sashes are located on north, east and west elevations of the booking/parcels office. A shallow pitched gabled red corrugated iron roof covers the building. The timber goods lift tower is the dominant element of the former booking/parcels office building and has a hipped corrugated metal roof. The goods lift is not in operation, and it is not clear if the original lift survives. However; the existence of a few safety signs indicates possible uses for maintenance or similar activities. The timber tower extends down onto the platform with a timber panelled out-of-shed building on the platform. The southern leg of the steel trestles sits within the out-of-shed.

Internal: Access only was available to the open ladies waiting room and toilets. The interiors of this former booking office are simple with plasterboard wall and ceiling panelling decorated with plain timber rail at lintel height and timber skirting. Floors are tiled. The original ticket window survives.

==== Station Master's residence, erected c. 1880 ====
External: Located at 6 Railway Parade to the eastern side of Lithgow Station, the Station Master's residence is a fine example of a grand two-storey railway residence. It is constructed of brick and stone, with rusticated render to the main railway facades and a slate tiled roof. The residence is located on the northern side of the railway line with a projecting faceted observatory room over the entrance portico. The distinctive Victorian features include arched windows with contrasting rendered moulded trims and sills, projecting keystones, rendered contrasting string band at the first-floor slab level, decorative moulded brackets supporting the wide eaves, a rendered chimney with corbelled top, timber-framed double-hung windows with two-pane upper sashes, timber panelled entrance door with sidelights and fanlight, and an arched two-storey high decorative portico with tessellated tile flooring over the front entry dominating the railway facade. A highly decorated drawing room bay on the ground floor level dominates the Sydney side elevation of the building and features a series of segmental-arched tall windows with moulded sill course and label panels below the sill, pitched slate roof with lead capping and flashing, decorative moulded brackets supporting the awning, and moulded trims and keystones to the arches. Access to the residence is via a porch from the face brick two-storey wing on the Railway Parade elevation. A later skillion roof utility room addition is located on the western side of the residence. The orientation of the building's openings including the architectural detailing and embellishment provide evidence of the close relationship between the Station Master's residence and the Station as well as the importance given to the railway staff at the time.

Internal: The former Station Master's residence is still in use as guest accommodation and generally maintains its original layout and detailing despite the refurbishments over time. The main original features include timber board ceiling lining to the refurbished kitchen, timber moulded architraves throughout, decorative high wall vents, timber panelled ceilings with decorative ceiling roses to main ground floor rooms and upper floor bedrooms, an original light switch, timber decorative stair with turned balustrade and newel post and fireplaces with simple timber surround. There is only one fireplace with a cast iron grate, the remainder of the fireplaces having been blocked. The kitchen features an old-style Bega brand stove in the fireplace. The bathrooms and kitchen are relatively new fit-outs while the floor finishes are generally carpet to the rooms and tile to the wet areas. A small laundry and a toilet are located in the later skillion addition.

==== Moveable items ====
The following moveable items have been observed at Lithgow Railway Station Group:

- A Seth Thomas clock at overhead Station Master's office (no number).
- Wall-mounted clock on Platform 1 elevation of the Station Building next to the former Station Master's office door.
- Various early timber station signs depicting the station building room and platform names.
- Old Bega brand stove in the kitchen of the SM's residence.
- Early light switch on the upstairs main bedroom of the SM's residence.

==== Potential archaeological features ====
The former 1877 railway platform of the first Lithgow Station is the only known potential archaeological element at the Lithgow Railway Station Group.

=== Condition ===
As of 25 August 2009, the station building is generally in good condition with minimal missing mortar joints that present no structural danger. The former Booking/Parcels office & Goods lift tower is generally in moderate condition. Rising damp and rotten timber is evident at the platform base of the out-of-shed and the lift tower. External repainting is required in near future. Internal spaces could not be inspected. The Station Master's Residence is generally in good condition externally with cracks on the rusticated render along the bottom portion of the railway elevation. However, this is not considered a structural issue. Natural wear and tear throughout the exterior is evident. Internally the residence is in very good condition. The island platform is in good condition. The Hayley Street Footbridge is in very good condition. Access was not available for close inspection of the Old Station platform, however, appears to be in moderate condition due to overgrown grassed environment.

The overall integrity of the Railway Station Group including the station building, the residence, and the overhead booking /parcels office and goods lift tower is high. The buildings are relatively intact externally.

=== Modifications and dates ===
- Externally, the main platform building appears as it was constructed with the additional bay on the Up end.
- 1929 – an awning was erected over the footpath of Eskbank Street.
- 1948 – the overhead booking office on Eskbank Street was extended.
- 1977 – Office Building – air-condition units installed to the district engineer's, officer and clerk offices.
- 1983 – the Eskbank Street booking office was modernised.
- 199? – a new "bus/rail interchange" was erected at the western end of the platform with the footbridge over tracks. The Eskbank Street access ramp was closed and a new booking office was opened on the footbridge.
- 1994–95 – a lift was installed at the new ramp.
- N.d. – The former brick subtype 1 through shed (goods shed) could not be located and appears to have since been demolished.
- N.d. – Foot warmer and out-of-shed removed.

=== Further information ===
The Lithgow Coal Stage Signal Box, Eskbank Railway Station, and Lithgow (James Street) Underbridge all have separate listings.

The following items are located adjacent to the station but are excluded from the listing as they do not warrant listing on the SHR:

- Substation – c. 1940 rectangular single-storey substation of face brick construction featuring strongly emphasized engaged piers with a decorative projecting accent, a four-course brick base with a recessed course and bull-nosed splay on top, a parapet with capping extending above the piers, and a metal door with bullnose brick surrounds. The rear of the substation appears to be damaged in part with a paint finish on the wall possibly to obscure some graffiti.
- Office Building – c. 1955 large two-storey office building of face brick construction. It is located to the west of the Station Master's residence at the corner of Railway Parade and Eskbank Street. The building combines three adjacent wings, one of which has a higher skill level to the upper storey windows resulting in higher eaves and ridge level than the other wings. They form a stepped complex building. The overall fenestration of the building is typical of post-war period office building façade articulation featuring large 12-pane metal windows with three casement windows, with dominant mullion, s emphasised. A rendered string course forms a hood along with the lintel height of the ground floor and is the only decorative element on the main façade that provides continuity between the wings beside the windows. The main office block entry is from the eastern smallest wing via a recessed porch with large multi-paned floor to ceiling glazing and a single door opening. Three doors with a utilitarian appearance (one to the main large building and the others in the group to the central wing) provide separate access to the individual wings. The roof is hipped with terracotta tiles. A single flight later addition steel fire stair is attached to the west elevation of the large wing, which required the creation of a new door opening on the upper-level elevation. These are the only visible major modifications to the exterior of the building. Security grills to ground floor doors and obscure glazing to some windows are the other minor changes.

== Platforms and services ==
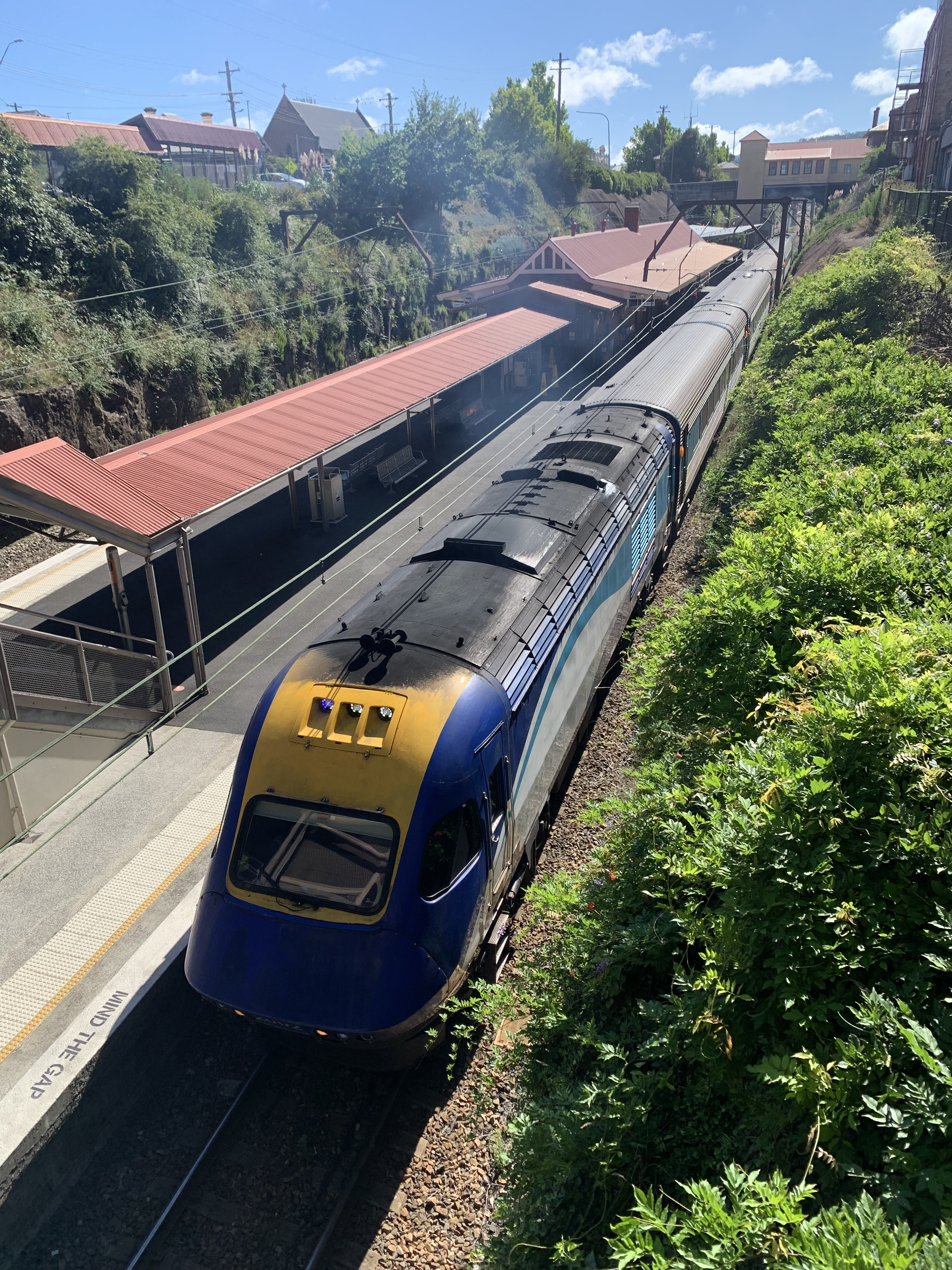
The daily Central West XPT

Lithgow has one island platform with two sides. It is the terminating point for many Sydney Trains Blue Mountains Line services from Sydney Central as well as several daily trains from Bathurst to Lithgow. It is also served by the Bathurst Bullet to Bathurst, the Central West XPT to Dubbo and the Outback Xplorer to Broken Hill. Journey Beyond's Indian Pacific passes Lithgow but does not stop at the station.

Mariyung preparing to depart Lithgow Station

Platform	Line	Stopping pattern	Notes
1	Blue Mountains Line	2 morning Bathurst Bullet services to Sydney Central terminating services to & from Sydney Central terminating services to & from Bathurst	
1	Western Region	services to Sydney Central	
2	Blue Mountains Line	2 early morning & 2 evening services to Bathurst terminating services to & from Sydney Central terminating services to & from Bathurst	
2	Western Region	services to Dubbo & Broken Hill	

== Transport links ==
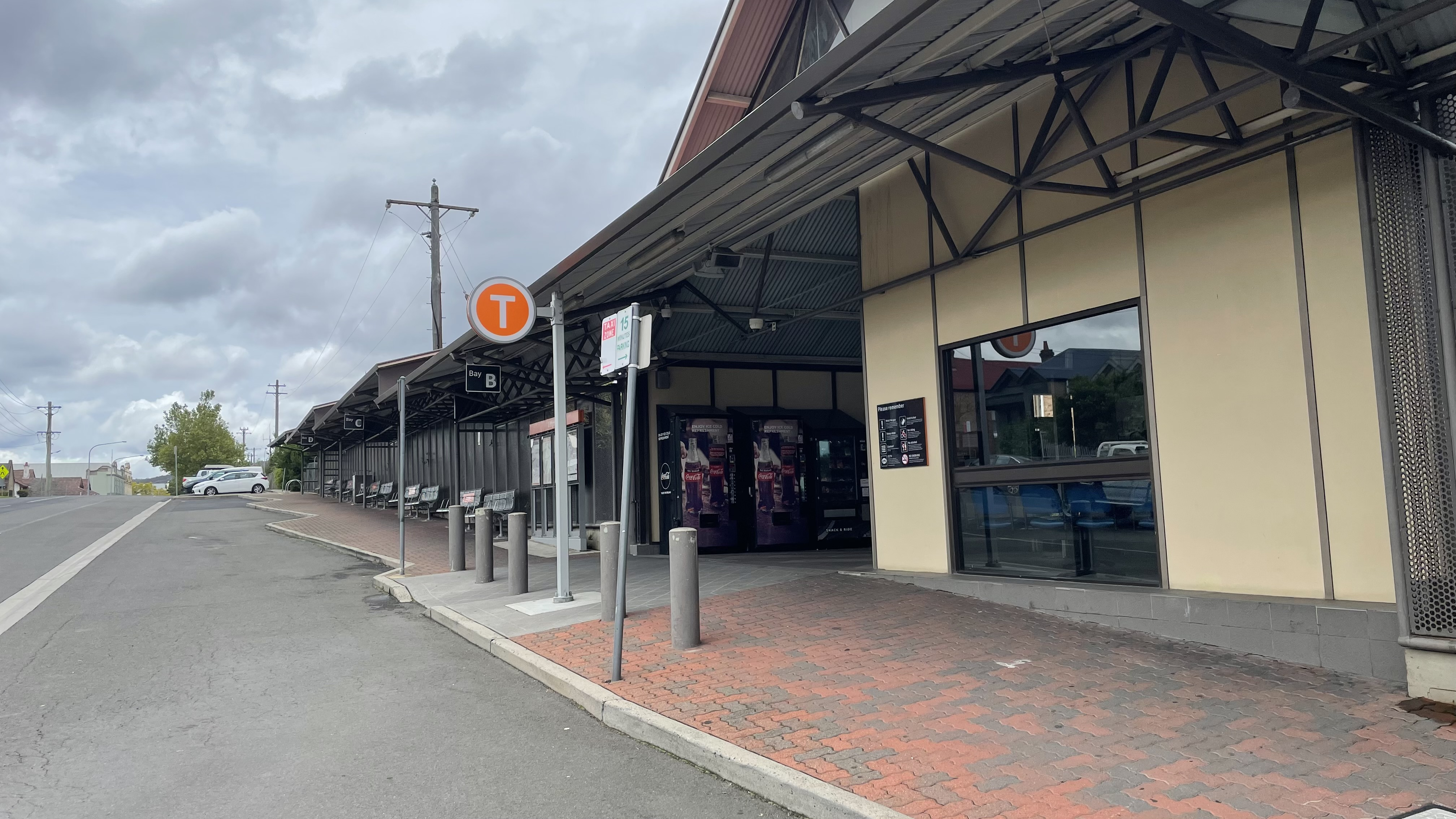
The bus terminal in 2021.

Lithgow Buslines operate two routes (including one school bus route) to and from Lithgow station:

- 304: Hermitage Flat to Lithgow via Morts Estate & Oakley Park (Loop Service)
- S366 (School Bus): Hippo Bus - Capertee to Lithgow Schools via Lidsdale

Opal Cards are not accepted on either route. The area is part of the Central West and Orana bus network. Several other bus routes stop nearby.

NSW TrainLink operate road coach services from Lithgow to Coonabarabran, Gulgong, Grenfell, Orange, Nyngan, Parkes, Baradine, Dubbo, Central, Strathfield, Katoomba and Bathurst.

== Heritage listing ==
As of 10 December 2009, Lithgow Railway Station is significant as an important regional headquarters for the NSW Railways since the 1920s combining a range of buildings and structures dating from the 1880s to the mid-1920s and is significant for its strong associations with the rail and coal industry in the wider Lithgow and Eskbank area. Along with nearby Eskbank Station, the site provides physical evidence of the activities and development that occurred in the historic Lithgow railway corridor marking several important phases in the evolution of railway operations in the most western end of the upper Blue Mountains. The buildings reflect the development of the site, the shift of the station location and the development of the town as a major mining area in the early years of the century.

Lithgow Railway Station is of aesthetic significance as it comprises a number of buildings that are individually good examples of their type. The platform building is a good example of a standard island-building demonstrating the typical characteristics of Federation railway architecture used throughout NSW. The weatherboard overhead booking and parcels office and the goods lift tower display both aesthetic and technical achievements in design and construction. The Station Master's residence is a fine example of a grand two-storey railway residence with a prominent and landmark quality overlooking the railway corridor. Its distinctive architectural detailing and fenestration is evidence of prosperity in the railways and the importance given to the railway staff in the 1880s.

Lithgow railway station was listed on the New South Wales State Heritage Register on 30 August 2013 having satisfied the following criteria.

The place is important in demonstrating the course, or pattern, of cultural or natural history in New South Wales.

Lithgow Railway Station Group is of historical significance for its role as an important regional headquarters for NSW Railways combining a range of buildings and structures dating from the 1880s to the mid-1920s and for its association with the rail history and the coal industry in the Lithgow and Eskbank area. The site provides physical evidence of the activities and development that occurred in Lithgow railway historic precinct and marks an important phase in the evolution of railway operations in the most western end of the upper Blue Mountains and the Metro West railway region.

The place is important in demonstrating aesthetic characteristics and/or a high degree of creative or technical achievement in New South Wales.

The Lithgow Railway Station Group is of aesthetic significance as it comprises a number of buildings that are individually good examples of their type. The station building is a good example of the standard island-building style with a sympathetic addition to one end and features typical characteristics elements of the Federation design railway building. The weatherboard overhead booking and parcels office building and the goods lift tower display both aesthetic and technical achievements in design and construction. Although it is unclear it appears that the original lift may still be in use. The Station Master's residence is a fine example of a grand two-storey railway residence with a prominent and landmark quality overlooking the railway corridor. Its distinctive architectural detailing and fenestration is evidence of prosperity in the railways and the importance given to the railway staff in the 1880s.

The place has a strong or special association with a particular community or cultural group in New South Wales for social, cultural or spiritual reasons.

The place has the potential to contribute to the local community's sense of place and can provide a connection to the local community's history.

The place has potential to yield information that will contribute to an understanding of the cultural or natural history of New South Wales.

Lithgow Railway Station Group has research potential at the local level due to its relatively intact complex of buildings that generally maintain their original relationship and layout. The group also has the ability to provide valuable information on railway design for the local coal industry as part of the larger rail network.

The place possesses uncommon, rare or endangered aspects of the cultural or natural history of New South Wales.

Lithgow Railway Station Group comprises a rare goods lift tower from the street down to the platform. The 1925 goods lift tower is a unique arrangement and possibly the first example of providing this form of platform access in the railway network.

The place is important in demonstrating the principal characteristics of a class of cultural or natural places/environments in New South Wales.

The Station Group as a whole is a representative example of a larger station design incorporating standard design buildings and structures associated with the coal industry goods traffic that is still an important railway activity in the region.

== See also ==
- List of railway stations in New South Wales
