= Rydal railway station =

Railway station in New South Wales, Australia

Rydal
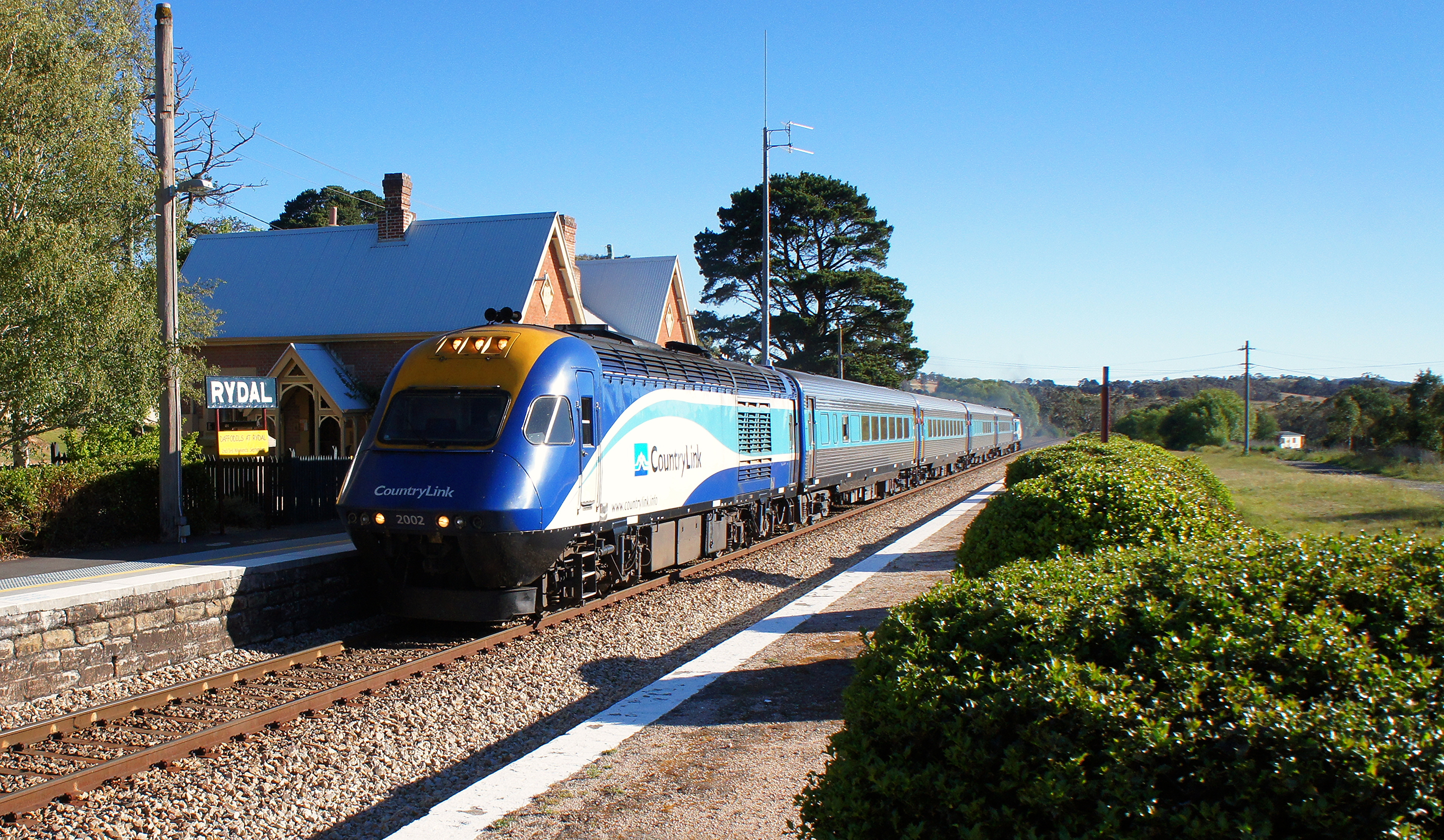
- Southbound view from Platform 2, with a NSW TrainLink XPT at the station, December 2013

General information
- Location: Bathurst Street, Rydal; Australia
- Coordinates: 33°29′01″S 150°01′54″E
- Owner: Transport Asset Manager of New South Wales
- Operator: Sydney Trains
- Line: Main Western
- Distance: 181.4 kilometres (112.7 mi) from Central
- Platforms: Two side (One disused)
- Tracks: One

Construction
- Structure type: Ground
- Accessible: Assisted access

Other information
- Station code: RDL

History
- Opened: 1 July 1870

Passengers
- 2023: Less than 50 per month.

Services
Preceding station	Intercity Trains	Following station
Tarana towards Bathurst	Blue Mountains Line (4 daily services) Bathurst Bullet	Lithgow towards Central
Preceding station	NSW TrainLink	Following station
Tarana towards Dubbo	NSW TrainLink Western Line Dubbo XPT	Lithgow towards Sydney

New South Wales Heritage Register
- Official name: Rydal Railway Station group
- Type: State heritage (complex / group)
- Designated: 2 April 1999
- Reference no.: 1239
- Type: Railway Platform / Station
- Category: Transport – Rail
Location
- Location within New South Wales

Rydal railway station is a heritage-listed railway station located on the Main Western line in Rydal, New South Wales, Australia within the City of Lithgow local government area (LGA). It is also known as Rydal Railway Station group. The property was added to the New South Wales State Heritage Register on 2 April 1999.

The station master's residence is available for tourists to stay in.

== History ==
The station opened on 1 July 1870 and was the next finished extension west from Lithgow after Wallerawang had been finalised four months earlier. Two years later the line was again extended finishing at Tarana before reaching Bathurst in 1876.

On 14 March 1915, the line was duplicated with a second platform built. The station closed on 27 May 1989, with the track lifted from the 1915 built platform in 1998 when the line was singled.

The station building has been converted to a library.

== Description ==
The complex comprises:

- Station / residence – type 1 – sub-type 2, 1869
- Signal box – type 3, small, c. 1914
- Platform faces – stone and brick
- War memorial

== Services ==
Rydal is served by NSW TrainLink's daily Central West Express service stops here and operates between Sydney and Dubbo. The XPT only stops on request if passengers have booked to board/alight here. From 16 September 2019 the four times daily Bathurst Bullet services also stop here.

Platform	Line	Stopping pattern	Notes
1	BMT	2 morning services to Sydney Central; 2 evening services to Lithgow; 4 daily services to Bathurst	
1	Western Region	Services to Sydney Central and Dubbo	request stop (booked passengers only)
2	Not in use		

== Heritage listing ==
As at 27 November 2000, the station building was constructed when the line opened to Rydal and retains its original form from that period. It is an important early railway complex that maintains its setting (largely through main road bypass) and which forms an important visual element in the valley viewed from both road approaches and from the level crossing. The changing view of the structure from the road is the visual focus of the town which is now a remnant of its previous importance as a centre for the production of fine wool. The station building symbolises the confidence in railway construction and the transition towards a railway architecture. It is a rare example of a combined station/residence, five of which remain. All similar structures, found further west towards Blayney, have major alteration or extensions. The other items on the site are significant as they indicate the development of the system and how early sites adapted to duplication and increased traffic followed by more recently decreased traffic.

Rydal railway station was listed on the New South Wales State Heritage Register on 2 April 1999 having satisfied the following criteria.

The place possesses uncommon, rare or endangered aspects of the cultural or natural history of New South Wales.

This item is assessed as historically rare. This item is assessed as scientifically rare. This item is assessed as arch. rare. This item is assessed as socially rare.

== See also ==
- List of railway stations in regional New South Wales
