= Marrangaroo railway viaduct =

Heritage listed railway viaduct in New South Wales, Australia

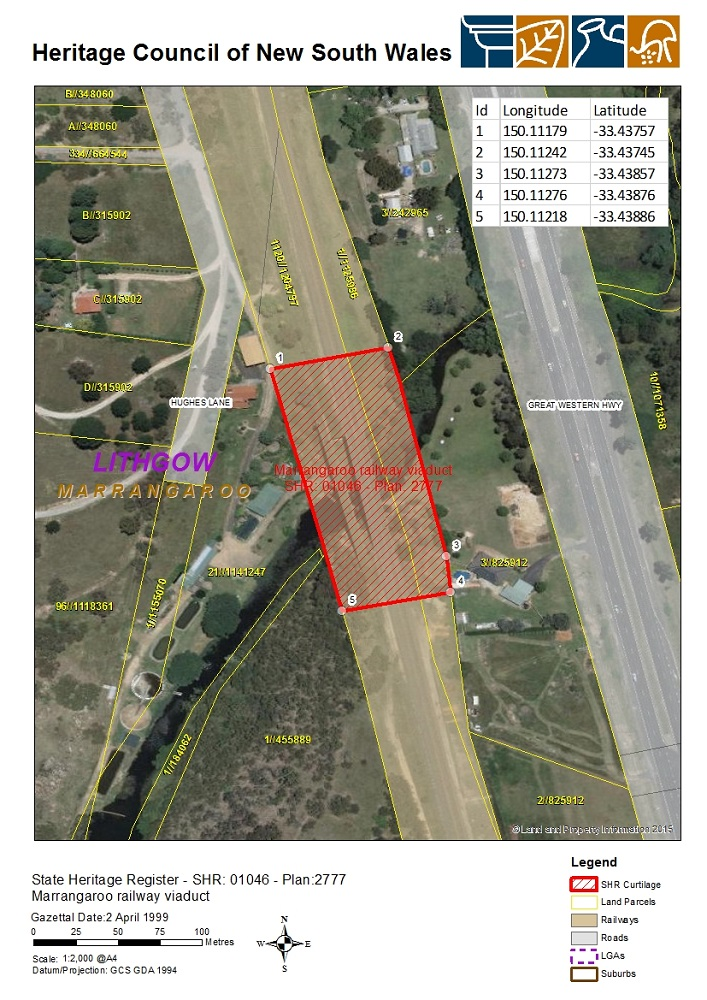
- Heritage boundaries
- Coordinates: 33°26′17″S 150°06′44″E
- Carries: Main Western Line
- Crosses: Marrangaroo Creek
- Locale: Marrangaroo, City of Lithgow, New South Wales, Australia
- Owner: Transport Asset Manager of New South Wales

Characteristics
- Design: Viaduct
- Material: Sydney sandstone

Rail characteristics
- No. of tracks: 2
- Track gauge: 4 ft 8 1/2 in (1,435 mm) standard gauge

History
- Designer: John Whitton
- Constructed by: George McGarvie Donald
- Construction end: 1870
- Opened: 1 March 1870

New South Wales Heritage Register
- Official name: Marrangaroo railway viaduct
- Type: State heritage (built)
- Designated: 2 April 1999
- Reference no.: 1046
- Type: Railway bridge / Viaduct
- Category: Transport – Rail
- Builders: George McGarvie Donald

Location
- Interactive map of Marrangaroo railway viaduct

The Marrangaroo railway viaduct is a heritage-listed railway viaduct that carries the Main Western Line across Marrangaroo Creek at Marrangaroo in the City of Lithgow local government area of New South Wales, Australia. The property added to the New South Wales State Heritage Register on 2 April 1999.

== History ==
=== Main Western Line ===
The Main Western Line was built in stages, radiating west from Central station to Parramatta, opened on 26 September 1855; Blacktown on 4 July 1860; Rooty Hill in 1861 and by May 1862, St Marys; Kingswood on 7 July 1862; and Penrith on 18 January 1863; at which point the Nepean River and Blue Mountains were significant barriers. Various plans were considered to cross the Blue Mountains, with the NSW Government selecting the submission of John Whitton, Chief Engineer of Railways, that involved the construction of the Victoria Bridge over the Nepean, completed in 1867; the Lapstone Zig Zag, completed in 1867; and The Great Zig Zag at Clarence, completed in 1869. The line had reached Bowenfels by 1869 and the section to Wallerawang opened on 1 March 1870. To complete this stage, major crossings were required, of Farmers Creek via the Bowenfels rail viaduct, completed in 1870 and replaced in 1921; Marrangaroo Creek (also known as Middle River) via the Marrangaroo railway viaduct; and the Coxs River via a single-track stone railway bridge at Wallerawang, completed in 1870.

=== George McGarvie Donald, stonemason ===
The builder, George McGarvie Donald of Lithgow, was a master stonemason and builder who helped create the city of Lithgow. Born in Paddington in 1846, he was son of a Scottish stonemason, George Donald. Donald senior had been encouraged to migrate to New South Wales by Governor Macquarie who wished him to assist with government building works. Donald junior did an apprenticeship as a stonemason under his father and uncle. After this he was engaged on railway construction projects in the Bowenfels district in the late 1860s. He worked on stone railway bridges at The Great Zig Zag and Marrangaroo, and married Marion Wiles, daughter of one of the construction foremen. Following completion of the railway he moved to Hill End and worked on a range of construction projects. Among these was Hill End Methodist church, built of basalt rubble from the gold mines. It is now used as an Anglican church. After the failure of the deep lead gold boom of the 1870s George returned to the Lithgow valley and established a construction business with Thomas Crowe. In the early 1880s he constructed St Mary's Presbyterian Church for Thomas Brown, built as a memorial to Brown's wife, Mary. He also built Cooerwull Academy for Brown, and the St John the Evangelist Church at Wallerawang. Other projects included Lithgow Town Hall, Wallerawang Public School the Lithgow Oddfellows Hall and many residences. Donald and Crowe also built Mort's freezing works. George Donald was extremely active in community affairs and had a great sense of social justice. He was founding member of the GUIOOF Lily of the Valley Lodge and the Good Templars Lodge. Popular among citizens he was elected the first mayor of Lithgow after establishment of the Municipality of Lithgow in 1889. He held the seat of Hartley in the NSW Legislative Assembly jointly with Joseph Cook from 1891.

== Description ==
Located approximately 163 kilometres (101 mi) from Central station, the single-track Marrangaroo railway viaduct comprises eight 9-metre (30 ft) sandstone arches, filled with stone rubble. The viaduct was designed by John Whitton, Chief Engineer of Railways, and built by George McGarvie Donald with convict labour. Crossing Marrangaroo Creek, at the time known as Middle River, Whitton used stone arch construction almost exclusively between Emu Plains and Wallerawang, despite a government decree to use local timber for bridge construction. This was possible due to the availability of local sandstone, which made the introduction of stone viaducts an economical option. While Whitton's stone arch viaducts were replaced by brick bridges during duplication works in the 1920s, many of the original stone bridges remain extant, including the Middle River Bridge at Marrangaroo.

The stone viaduct was replaced in 1923, following duplication of the track and construction of a replacement brick and masonry viaduct, comprising four 15-metre (50 ft) spans.

== Heritage listing ==
Marrangaroo railway viaduct was listed on the New South Wales State Heritage Register on 2 April 1999.

The underbridge at Marrangaroo is significant as one of a small series of early stone arch railway viaducts built in New South Wales in the mid-to-late nineteenth century. The bridge is closely associated with Engineer-in-Chief and ‘father’ of the New South Wales Government Railways, John Whitton. It is an impressive and highly visible curved sandstone structure. The bridge has historical significance, largely due to its contribution to the early and continuing development of railway infrastructure and services in western NSW in the late nineteenth century and early twentieth century, and also as an example of the use of local sandstone during a period of economic restraint but rapid expansion of railway services during which Whitton was required to use local materials as far as possible in bridge construction. It is a fine, intact and representative example of a stone arch railway viaduct.

== See also ==
- List of railway bridges in New South Wales
