= George Donald =

Australian politician and stonemason

- Born: 12 May 1846; Paddington
- Died: 9 July 1930 (aged 84); Marrickville
- Occupation: Stonemason
- Known for: Lithgow construction
- Notable work: Lithgow Zig Zag

George McGarvie Donald (12 May 1846 – 9 July 1930) was an Australian politician and stonemason.

Donald was born at Paddington to stonemason George Donald and Jane Galbraith.

In 1852 the family settled at Yass, and the younger Donald learned his father's trade, under an apprenticeship as a stonemason, guided by his father and uncle. From 1867 he was engaged by John Whitton on railway construction projects in the Bowenfels district. He worked on stone railway bridges at The Great Zig Zag, east of Lithgow, and the Marrangaroo railway viaduct. In 1870 married Marion Wiles, daughter of one of the construction foremen. Donald and Wilkes had ten children.

Following completion of the railway he moved to Hill End and worked on a range of construction projects. Among these was Hill End Methodist Church, built of basalt rubble from the gold mines. It is now used as an Anglican church. After the failure of the deep lead gold boom of the 1870s George returned to the Lithgow valley and established a construction business with Thomas Crowe. In the early 1880s he constructed St Mary's Presbyterian Church for Thomas Brown, built as a memorial to Brown's wife, Mary. He also built Cooerwull Academy for Brown, and the St John the Evangelist Church at Wallerawang. Other projects included Lithgow Town Hall, Wallerawang Public School the Lithgow Oddfellows Hall and many residences. Donald and Crowe also built Mort's freezing works.

Donald was extremely active in community affairs and had a great sense of social justice. He was founding member of the GUIOOF Lily of the Valley Lodge and the Good Templars Lodge. Popular among citizens he was elected the first mayor of Lithgow after establishment of the Municipality of Lithgow in 1889. He held the seat of Hartley in the New South Wales Legislative Assembly jointly with Joseph Cook from 1891.

Around 1909 he moved to Sydney. Donald died in 1930 at Marrickville.

New South Wales Legislative Assembly
| Preceded by John Hurley | Member for Hartley; 1891–1894; Served alongside: Joseph Cook | Succeeded by Joseph Cook |
