= St John the Evangelist Church, Wallerawang =

St John the Evangelist Church
- Church of St. John the Evangelist
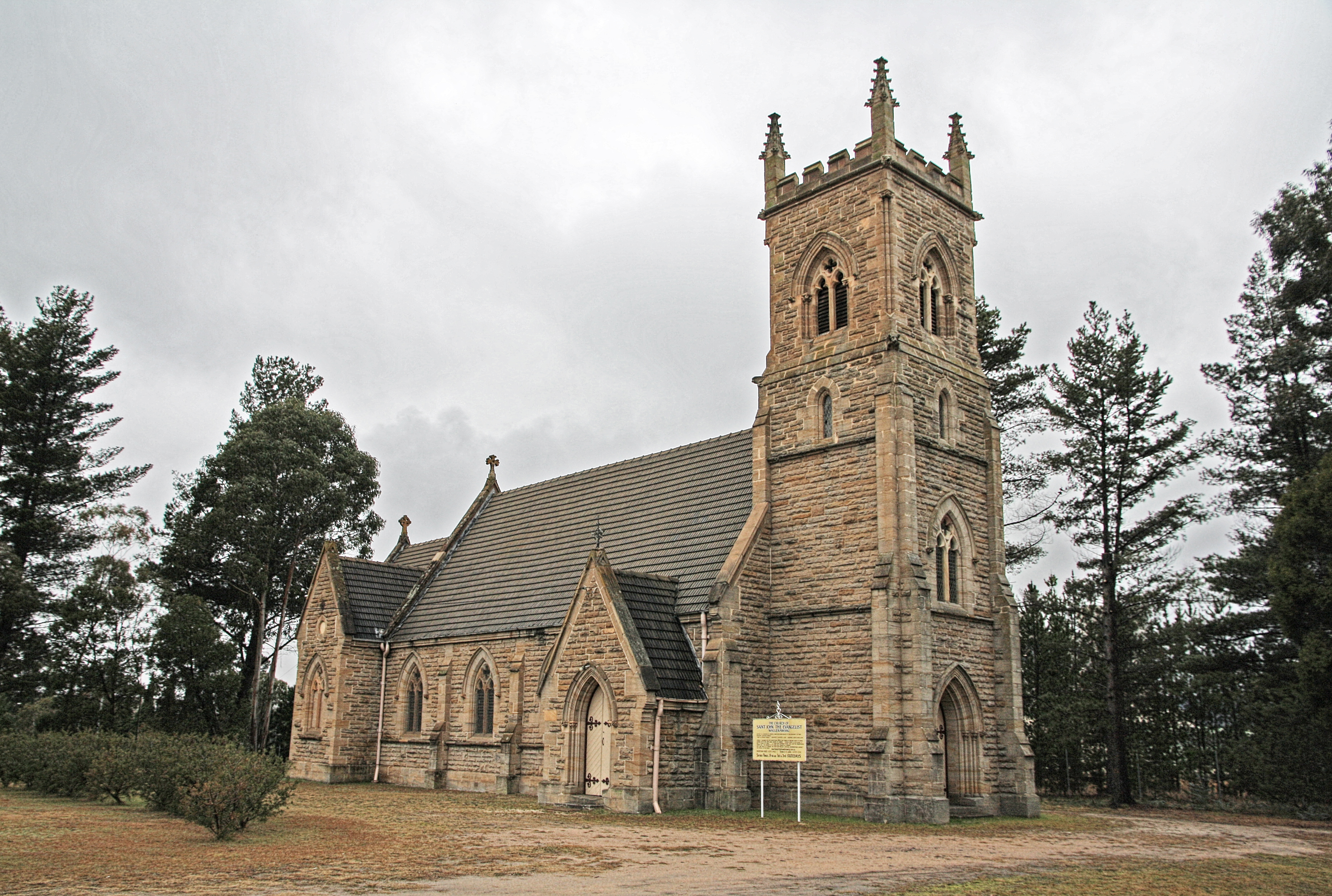
- St John the Evangelist Church, in 2010.
- St John the Evangelist Church
- 33°24′03″S 150°04′40″E
- Location: Main Street, Wallerawang, City of Lithgow, New South Wales
- Country: Australia
- Denomination: Presbyterian
- Previous denomination: Anglican (1880–2001)

History
- Former name: Wallerawang Estate Chapel
- Status: Church
- Founded: 28 September 1880
- Founder: Georgina Walker-Barton
- Dedication: John the Evangelist
- Dedicated: 6 November 1881

Architecture
- Functional status: Active
- Architects: Edmund Blacket; Blacket and Sons
- Architectural type: Church
- Style: Gothic Revival
- Years built: 1880–1881
- Completed: 6 November 1881

Specifications
- Height: 15.2 metres (50 ft)
- Materials: Sandstone

Administration
- Division: New South Wales
- Parish: Lithgow

New South Wales Heritage Register
- Official name: St. John the Evangelist Church
- Type: State heritage (built)
- Designated: 10 September 2004
- Reference no.: 1702
- Type: Church
- Category: Religion
- Builders: George Donald

St John the Evangelist Church is a heritage-listed Presbyterian church located at Main Street, Wallerawang, City of Lithgow, New South Wales, Australia. It was designed by Edmund Blacket and Blacket and Sons, and built from 1880 to 1881 by George Donald. It is also known as the Church of St. John the Evangelist. It was added to the New South Wales State Heritage Register on 10 September 2004.

Established as a dual-denomination Unionist Anglican and Presbyterian church, the church was closed in 2001 in order to repair the tower. When it reopened in 2006, the Anglican Church ceased to conduct services in the building.

Prior to establishment of the church, the area was former Aboriginal land, a squatting run, and farm village.

== History ==
=== Wallerawang ===
The place named Wallerawang derives from the language of the Wiradjuri Aboriginal people who occupied the area before white settlement. It is said to mean "place near wood and water" or "plenty of water".

The first colonial settler in the Lithgow-Wallerawang district was James Walker. He was born in Perth, Scotland, in 1785, the son of wealthy merchant. He became an artillery officer in the Royal Marines and retired in 1822. In May 1823, he set sail on the Brutus for NSW.

A road was surveyed from Hartley to Mudgee in 1823, eleven years after the first successful white crossing of the Blue Mountains.

On reaching Sydney in September, Governor Brisbane granted Walker 809 hectares (2,000 acres) acres at Wallerowang, which stretched to the Wolgan Valley to the north. This land had been by-passed on the way to Bathurst by the early settlers. In 1837 he applied for more land between the Wolgan Valley and Bathurst. Walker started 1800 cross-bred sheep, 64 merinos, 312 head of cattle and 15 horses. By the end of 1840, he held an immense tract of country under licence and was running 1487 cattle and 20,534 sheep. In 1854 he was the holder of 16 stations with an area of 190,204 hectares (470,000 acres).

Thomas returned to Scotland and married his wife, Robina Ramsay Walker, his cousin, in 1832. They had four children; Allison, Archibald and Georgina (all born at Wallerawang) and Wilhelmina (born in London). James had sympathy with the Church of England as well as a strong acceptance of Presbyterian doctrine. He was a deeply religious man and built a house, Wallerawang Station and a church. Clergy from both denominations were frequently welcomed at Wallerawang, including the Rev. Colin Stewart, pioneer Presbyterian minister who arrived in the area in 1830.

James Walker died on 24 November 1856, aged 71 and was buried in the family cemetery on the estate. He is remembered as having good dealings with his convict workers and also a remarkable relationship with the local Wywandy Aboriginal people. In 1866 his widow, who still held licences for 15 stations, died in 1867.

=== St John The Evangelist Church ===
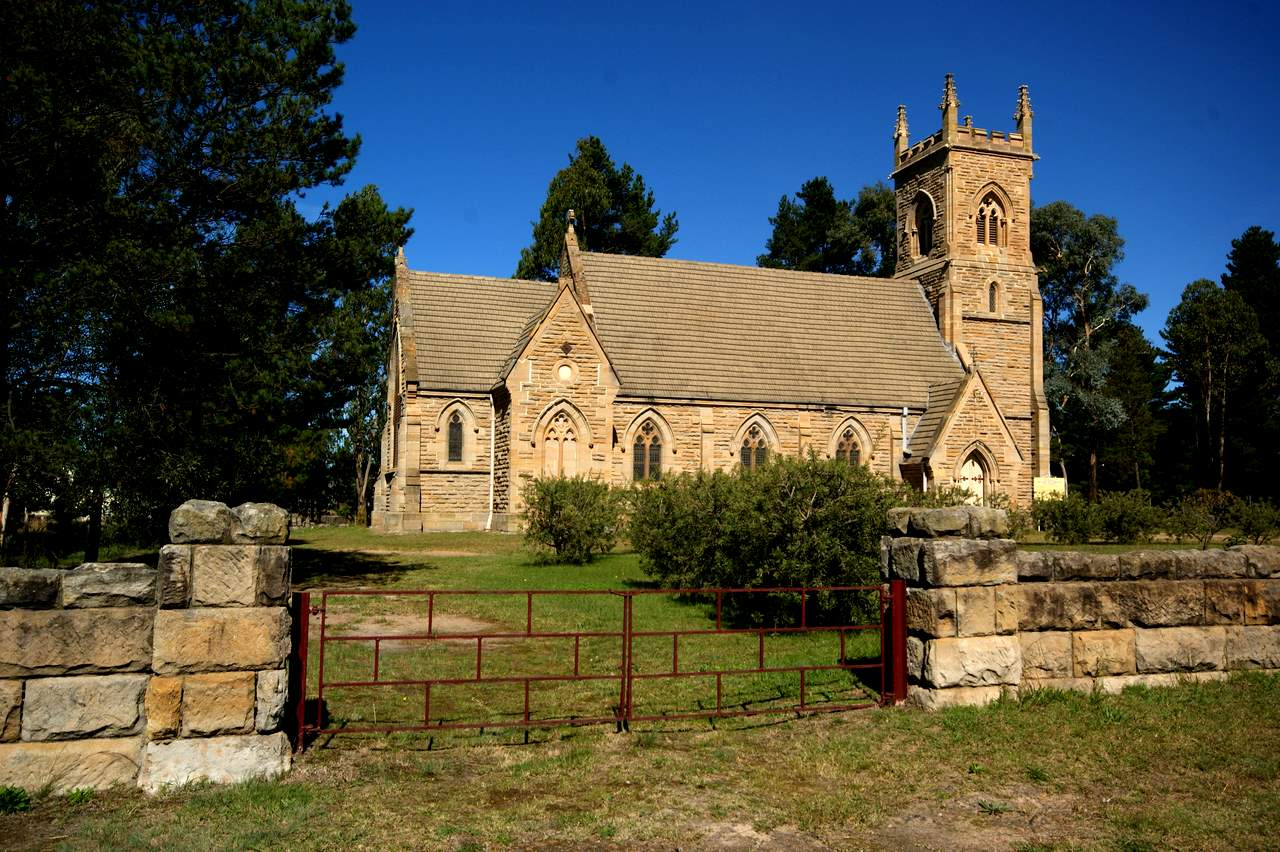
St John the Evangelist Church, pictured in 2010.

Their daughter Georgina Walker-Barton married Edwin Barton, who was the surveyor / engineer of the Zig Zag railway. He died in 1876. Mrs Barton commissioned renowned Gothic Revival church architect and family friend, Edmund Blacket, in 1880 to design St John The Evangelist Church on the estate as a place of worship for the Church of England and the Presbyterians of Wallerawang. The church was a commemoration to her parents and family, who had all died before her. It was to be used as the Wallerawang Estate Chapel and a "union" or public dual-denomination church: by both the Presbyterian and Anglican denominations in memory of James Walker, his wife Robina and Georgina's late husband Edwin Barton. She mainly financed the construction and established a small Gothic Revival style brick school nearby, which is still standing. The reflection of religious philanthropy is an important theme in Lithgow with five other churches in the area being privately funded.

The stone was from a quarry on Tunnel Hill, and the fine stone for the tracery and door frames came from Sydney. The carving on the Western Australian karri pews was designed to represent the Scottish heritage of the Walker / Barton family.

==== George Donald ====
The builder, George McGarvie Donald of Lithgow was a master mason and builder who helped create the city of Lithgow. He would later become its first Mayor and Member for Hartley. Born in Paddington in 1846, he was son of a Scottish stonemason, George Donald, senior. George senior had been encouraged to migrate to New South Wales by Governor Macquarie who wished him to assist with government building works. George junior did an apprenticeship as a mason under his father and uncle. After this he was engaged on railway construction projects in the Bowenfels district in the late 1860s. He worked on stone railway bridges at The Great Zig Zag and Marrangaroo and married Marion Wiles, daughter of one of the construction foremen.

Following completion of the railway Donald moved to Hill End and worked on a range of construction projects. Among these was Hill End Methodist church, built of basalt rubble from the gold mines. It is now used as an Anglican church. After the failure of the deep lead gold boom of the 1870s George returned to the Lithgow valley and established a construction business with Thomas Crowe. In the early 1880s he constructed St. Mary's Presbyterian church for Thomas Brown, built as a memorial to Brown's wife, Mary. He also built Cooerwull Academy (now De La Salle College, Littleton) for Brown, and the Church of St. John the Evangelist at Wallerawang. Other projects included Lithgow Town Hall, Wallerawang Public School the Lithgow Oddfellows Hall and many residences. Donald and Crowe also built Mort's freezing works. Donald was extremely active in community affairs and had a great sense of social justice. He was founding member of the GUIOOF Lily of the Valley Lodge and the Good Templars Lodge. Popular among citizens he was elected the first mayor of Lithgow after establishment of the Municipality of Lithgow in 1889. He held the seat of Hartley in the NSW Legislative Assembly jointly with Joseph Cook from 1891.

Donald was responsible for the best stone buildings of the late Victorian period in the area. The foundation stone was laid in 1880 by Bishop Frederic Barker D.D. of Sydney. He was assisted by the Anglican incumbent from Hartley and the Presbyterian minister of Bowenfels, with Rev. Colin Stewart in attendance.

==== Church design ====
Knowing Blacket's great success since 1843 in both Sydney and Australia for harmonising religious desires for austerity/simplicity with High Anglican richness, detail and iconography, Georgina ensured a magnificent opening ceremony in 1881, officiated by various dual denominational clerics. Furthermore, she granted in perpetuity the land to St Johns to be a parish Church for Presbyterians and Anglicans. The church was opened on 6 November 1881 by the Rev. Dr. Robert Steele, MA, Minister of St. Stephens Presbyterian Church, Phillip Street, Sydney. In attendance was Rev. W. J. Debenham, BA, Anglican Church representative, Mr Morgan, the local catechist, Rev. William McKenzie MA, Minister of Bowenfels and Wallerawang and Rev. Colin Stewart. The private church was used by both denominations with equal rights, an early ecumenical move.

The church's timber floor is locally-cut black Sallee (Eucalyptus pulverentula).

The church bell was cast by John Warner & Sons, Cripplegate, London, in 1880. Numerous memorials grace the church, in the form of plaques and stained glass windows. The magnificent east window represents the Prophets, Apostles, Christ and Martyrs. The church window is in memory of Georgina Lyon Wolgan Abbott, who married Thomas Abbott in 1882 after the death of her first husband Edwin Barton. The window was installed after Georgina's death in 1906.

The latest window was installed in 1962 in memory of Mary Barton, Georgina's daughter. James Lyong Walker Barton and his sister, Lue Loveday Walker Barton, were murdered at Wallerawang (by then renamed and rebuilt as 'Barton Park') on 26 September 1948. Barton Park homestead, including Wallerawang's extensive stone barn and outbuildings, is now under the waters of Lake Wallace, created in the late 1950s to power nearby Wallerawang Power Station. The Walker / Barton family cemetery now belongs to Delta Electricity Company and the cemetery remains above the water line. It may be visited by contacting the company.

==== Evangelical union ====
St. John's Church was given by the sole surviving member of the Barton family, Miss Hazel Gowring Walker Barton. On 18 November 1952 the Trustees of the Church of England, Sydney Diocese and the Presbyterian Church NSW became the new owners as tenants in common, with equal moiety. The Presbyterian minister from Bowenfels was conducting regular Sunday services but the local Anglican Parish has not used the church regularly since the early 1980s. Regular Anglican worship ceased at the church in 1971.

In 1983 a violent storm damaged the north-east tower's pinnacle, which fell and smashed. badly damaging the roof. Gosford Quarries repaired the roof and pinnacle, using Maitland stone.

Sometime during 2001 the church's insurance company ordered the property to be locked and fenced after an engineer's report revealed serious cracking in the bell tower that could be dangerous to people within the grounds. At this stage the church was no longer used for regular church services.

In 2001 the church was advertised for sale. Suggestions ranging from dismantling and rebuilding the church in Canberra to bulldozing it completely were met with vigorous opposition from the Presbyterian Bowenfels parish. Their efforts were supported by the establishment of the Friends of St. John's Church, to save this important community asset. The Friends' charter is to preserve the fine building in the interests of the community.

The church now belongs half to the Friends of St. John's Church and half to the Presbyterian Church NSW. Through the work of the Friends of St John Committee, who were successful in obtaining a grant from the Heritage Office, a conservation management plan and urgent structural and maintenance was work completed during 2004 and 2005. To mark the occasion of the official re-opening of St John the Evangelist Church a Thanksgiving Service was held on 14 May 2006. Church services (Presbyterian) restarted in May 2006 are now held on 1st and 3rd Sundays of each month at 8.30am. Once again the church is available for services of all faiths.

== Description ==
A large imposing church of Victorian Gothic style. The building is symmetrical with rectangular body, of cruciform plan with square high bell tower in three lifts (no turret), smaller chancel and transepts. Entrance porch at street side only (possibly an early addition). Pointed-arched sandstone windows, some stained glass, some diamond and square panes. The tower is even topped with battlements and pinnacles of a real "Carpenters" Gothic type and has interesting animal face gargoyles. Mix of dressed stone quoins and bush hammered stone elsewhere. Walls are buttressed. Cement on the roof is unsympathetic. There are fine stained glass windows erected between 1906 and 1962.

Other key measurements:

- Nave – 16 by 7.3 metres (52 by 24 ft)
- Chancel – 6 by 5.4 metres (20 by 18 ft)
- Organ chamber and vestry are in the transepts
- Tower – 15.2 metres (50 ft) high.

=== Condition ===
As at 1 August 2002, the physical condition is fair to poor. Cracking to bell tower. Largely intact, including interior designed by Blacket.

== Heritage listing ==
As at 5 October 2006, St John the Evangelist Church, Wallerawang, constructed between 1880 and 1881, is of state significance as a rare example of a major church building erected by private philanthropy, equalled in Lithgow only by the Hoskins Memorial Church and comparable to the Hunter Baillie Memorial Presbyterian Church in Annandale. It is one of the last major churches in the state built entirely by private philanthropy and is possibly the only example of a "union" or public dual-denomination church identified to date in the Central West region. It is associated with the architect Edmund Blacket and is a fine example of the architecture of Blacket and Sons. It is associated with the Lithgow pioneering family of James Walker and Edwin Barton, who was the surveyor of rail routes to western New South Wales. It is unique in the Lithgow area as a dual-denomination church and has wide social significance. St John the Evangelist Church contains numerous significant moveable objects and artefacts (e.g. main altar, pews, readers lectern, baptismal font and other associated furnishings, tables and chairs) that were purpose-built for the church.

St John the Evangelist Church was listed on the New South Wales State Heritage Register on 10 September 2004 having satisfied the following criteria.

The place is important in demonstrating the course, or pattern, of cultural or natural history in New South Wales.

St John the Evangelist Church is one of the last major churches in the State built entirely by private philanthropy and is possibly the only example of a "union" or public dual-denomination church identified to date in the Central West Region.

The place has a strong or special association with a person, or group of persons, of importance of cultural or natural history of New South Wales's history.

St John the Evangelist Church is associated with a number of prominent people and families including the architect Edmund Blacket and his firm Blacket and Sons and the Walker-Barton family.

The place is important in demonstrating aesthetic characteristics and/or a high degree of creative or technical achievement in New South Wales.

St John the Evangelist Church is a fine example of the work of architect, Edmund Blacket. It has the attributes of Victorian Gothic style. Materials and workmanship used throughout the church are of high quality including many stained glass windows, detailed carving to the sandstone and timberwork. The church occupies a prominent site at the northern entrance to Main Street, Wallerawang.

The place has a strong or special association with a particular community or cultural group in New South Wales for social, cultural or spiritual reasons.

St John the Evangelist Church has been the focus of Presbyterian and Anglican activities in the Wallerawang area for over 100 years. The church contains a number of memorials commemorating local people and is valued by the community as a place of religious significance.

The place possesses uncommon, rare or endangered aspects of the cultural or natural history of New South Wales.

St John the Evangelist Church is one of the last major churches in New South Wales built entirely by private philanthropy and is possibly the only example of a "union" or public dual-denomination church identified to date in the Central West Region.

== See also ==
- List of Anglican churches in New South Wales
- List of Presbyterian churches in New South Wales
