= Fernhill =

"Fern Hill" is a poem by Welsh poet Dylan Thomas.

Fernhill or Fern Hill may also refer to:

== Places ==
=== Australia ===
- Fernhill, Bowenfels, a heritage-listed residence and farmland located near Lithgow, New South Wales
- Fernhill, Mulgoa, a residence and surrounding estate located on the western outskirts of Sydney, New South Wales
- Fernhill, New South Wales, a suburb of Wollongong

=== Canada ===
- Fernhill Cemetery, located in Saint John, New Brunswick

=== India ===
- The Fernhills Palace, Ooty, the former erstwhile summer residence of the Maharaja of Mysore

=== Great Britain ===
- Fernhill, South Lanarkshire, area of Rutherglen, Scotland
- Fernhill, Rhondda Cynon Taf, village near Mountain Ash, Wales
  - Fernhill railway station, serving the village of Fernhill in the Cynon Valley, Wales
- Fernhill, West Sussex, hamlet within the borough of Crawley (but formerly in Surrey)
- Fernhill Heath, village in Worcestershire
  - Fernhill Heath railway station, former intermediate railway station on the Oxford, Worcester and Wolverhampton Railway
- Fernhill Park, a landed estate in Winkfield, Berkshire

=== New Zealand ===
- Fernhill Branch, railway line in Otago
- Fernhill, Dunedin, an inner suburb of Dunedin, Otago
- Fernhill, Hawke's Bay, a town in the North Island
- Fernhill, Queenstown, a suburb of Queenstown, Otago

=== United States ===
- Fernhill Park, a city park in Northeast Portland, Oregon
- Fern Hill, Tacoma, Washington

== Other uses ==
- Fern Hill (play), a 2018 play by American actor Michael Tucker
- Fernhill (band), Welsh folk band
- Fernhill School (disambiguation)
