= Bowenfels National School Site =

Former artist's studio in Lithgow, Australia

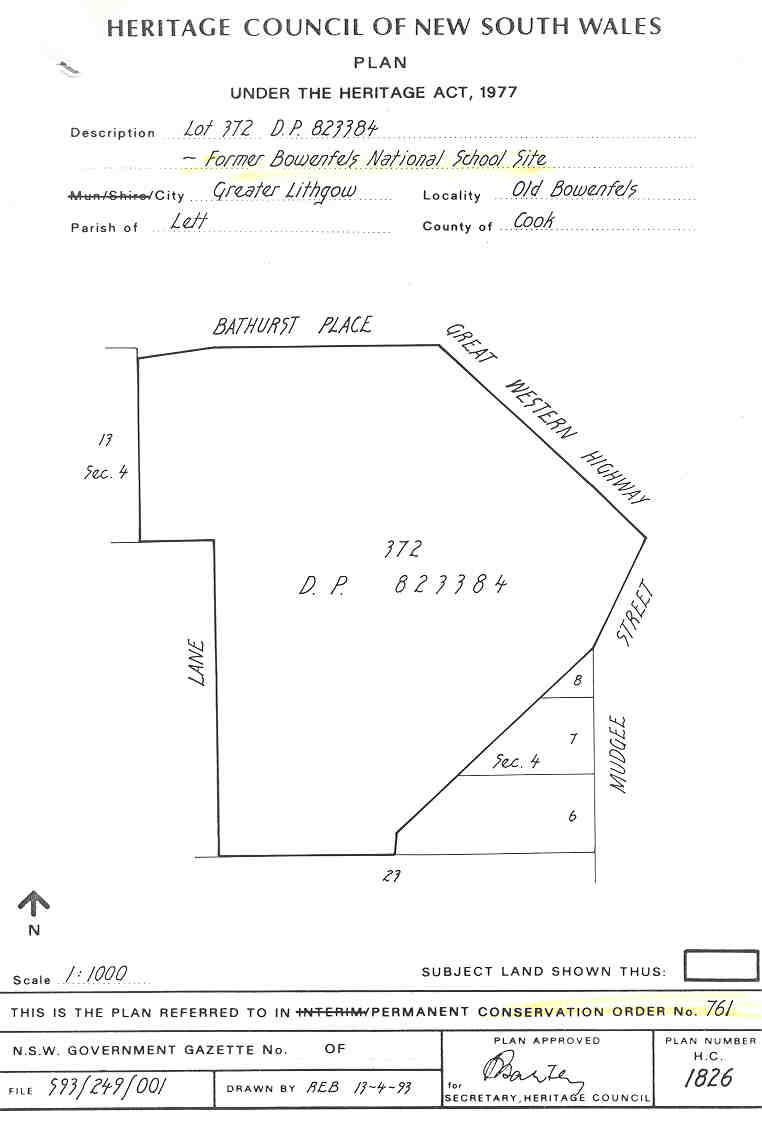
- Heritage boundaries

- Location within New South Wales Location within Australia
- 33°30′58″S 150°07′14″E
- Location: 70 Mudgee Street, South Bowenfels, City of Lithgow, New South Wales, Australia

History
- Built: 1851–1853

New South Wales Heritage Register
- Official name: Bowenfels National School Site; Bowenfels National School Site
- Type: State heritage (built)
- Designated: 2 April 1999
- Reference no.: 761
- Type: historic site
- Builders: James Connor (mason)

The Bowenfels National School Site is a heritage-listed former artist's studio and school and now residence located at 70 Mudgee Street, South Bowenfels in the Central West region of New South Wales, Australia. It was built between 1851 and 1853 by James Connor, a mason. It was added to the New South Wales State Heritage Register on 2 April 1999.

== History ==
Public education began exceptionally early in the Blue Mountains, with the National School at Bowenfels erected in 1851. An advertisement was placed in the Sydney Morning Herald of Friday 9 August 1850 "TO MASONS AND CARPENTERS. TENDERS are required for the erection of a National School-house in the village of Bowenfels, according to plan and specifications, lying at the stores of M'Lennan and Rose, who will in the mean time give any information required. Tenders to be opened by the Local Patrons on Monday, 26th August, current" by John M'Lennan Secretary. The foundation stone had been laid in October 1850. It was built by local people to a local design. It contained three rooms originally, one the school room, the other two the living space for the school teacher, John Edhouse. It opened without furniture, water supply or toilet but the local "patrons", mainly Scottish farmers, paid for improvements in 1852 and 1853.

In 1866 a new school room was built and all three rooms of the 1851 building became the schoolmaster's residence. The stone mason was James Connor, an innkeeper who lived nearby in Umera, itself later a private school. Connor was a gifted craftsman and responsible for some of the finest grave markers in the local cemeteries.

The 1866 building remained in use as a primary school for an extraordinarily long time, over a century, until the end of 1969. Since then the complex has been privately owned. For a time the 1866 school was used as an artist's studio, while the artist lived in the 1855 (sic: 1851-3) building.

== Description ==
1851–53 school house: 1851. It was built by local people to a local design. It contained three rooms originally, one the school room, the other two the living space for the school teacher, John Edhouse. It opened without furniture, water supply or toilet but the local "patrons", mainly Scottish farmers, paid for improvements in 1852 and 1853.

In 1866 a new school room was built and all three rooms of the 1851 building became the schoolmaster's residence.

=== Modifications and dates ===
- 1866 separate school room built. 1851–53 building adapted as school master's residence
- 1969: adaptation of 1866 school as artist's studio; 1851–53 residence as residence

== Heritage listing ==
The former School master's residence and combined school room at the former Bowenfels National School is the earliest government school building remaining in recognisable form in NSW being erected in 1851.

The residence is also the first government school established west of the Blue Mountains.

The former Bowenfels National School group of two sandstone buildings is the only known group of school buildings erected under the Board of Education which controlled education in NSW from 1848 to 1866.

The two buildings demonstrate the evolution of educational country school history spanning the period from 1851 to 1969.

The group of two buildings is the earliest of any type of school remaining in the Bowenfels and Hartley areas and form important components of the historic Old Bowenfels Historic Village.

Both buildings remain little altered since built, the residence being an excellent example of local vernacular building and the class room building is a rare remaining work of the noted colonial architect Henry Robertson.

The buildings have strong associations with the local community from 1851 and are associated with many noted local historical figures, in particular Andrew Brown of Cooerwall.

The site is significant in not having changed appreciable[ly] since 1851 and forms an important landscaped component of the village of Old Bownfels.

Bowenfels National School Site was listed on the New South Wales State Heritage Register on 2 April 1999.

== See also ==
- Cooerwull Academy
- List of former schools in New South Wales
