= Fernhill School =

Fernhill School may refer to:

- Fernhill School, Oakville, a secondary private school in Oakville, Ontario, Canada
- Fernhill School, Burlington, a secondary private school in Burlington, Ontario, Canada
- Fernhill School, Farnborough, a secondary school in Hampshire, England
- Fernhill School, Rutherglen, a secondary private school in South Lanarkshire, Scotland

== See also ==
- Fernhill (disambiguation)
