= Andrew Brown (industrialist) =

Sottish-Australian pastoralist (1797–1894)

- Born: 5 November 1797; Tibbermoor, Perthshire, Scotland
- Died: 2 April 1894 (aged 96); Bowenfels, New South Wales, Australia
- Occupations: Industrialist; pastoralist; philanthropist
- Known for: Founder of: Bowenfels Presbyterian Church; Cooerwull Academy; St Andrew's College

Andrew Brown (5 November 1797 – 2 April 1894), a Scottish–born Australian industrialist, pastoralist, and philanthropist, was instrumental in founding the township of Lithgow as well as a number of Presbyterian institutions.

== Early life ==
Brown was born in 1797 in Tibbermoor, Perthshire, Scotland. He was educated in Methven, Perth and Kinross and arrived in the Colony of New South Wales aboard Brutus on 24 September 1828.

In the period between 1824 and 1826 Brown acquired land at Bowenfels, New South Wales, effectively creating the first European settlement in the Lithgow Valley. He then acquired 200 acres (81 ha) of land in the valley, around Cooerwull Brook (now known in Lithgow as Farmer's Creek). The property originally used for grazing, became known as Cooerwull after the small blue flowers which grow in the area. A suburb in Lithgow still retains the name.

== Development of Lithgow ==
The next phase of life was replete with a number of changes to his property which fostered Lithgow's economic development. In 1837 Brown established a water driven flour mill on Cooerwull Brook to process the wheat grown both on his own property and on other properties in the Lithgow Valley. In the 1860s Brown claimed to have found coal on his land, however it was Alfred Carter who was working on property at the time. He used coal to power his flour and later tweed mill. Coal was later to become and still currently is one of Lithgow's major exports, although the road system of the time did not permit this coal to be exported east to Sydney.

== Philanthropy ==
As well as being an enterprising industrialist, Brown is also remembered as being a major contributor to the social fabric of the Presbyterian community of Lithgow and throughout New South Wales. In 1851 he founded the Cooerwull Academy, a Presbyterian boarding school for boys, and also built the Methven church and the current Bowenfels Presbyterian Church, as a school house for the children of itinerant rail workers in the area.

He was also a leading force in the creation of St Andrew's College at the University of Sydney.

A monument in his honour was originally unveiled in the Bowenfels Presbyterian Church in 1895, and is now located at Lithgow Uniting Church in Bridge Street, Lithgow.
