= Bowenfels rail viaducts =

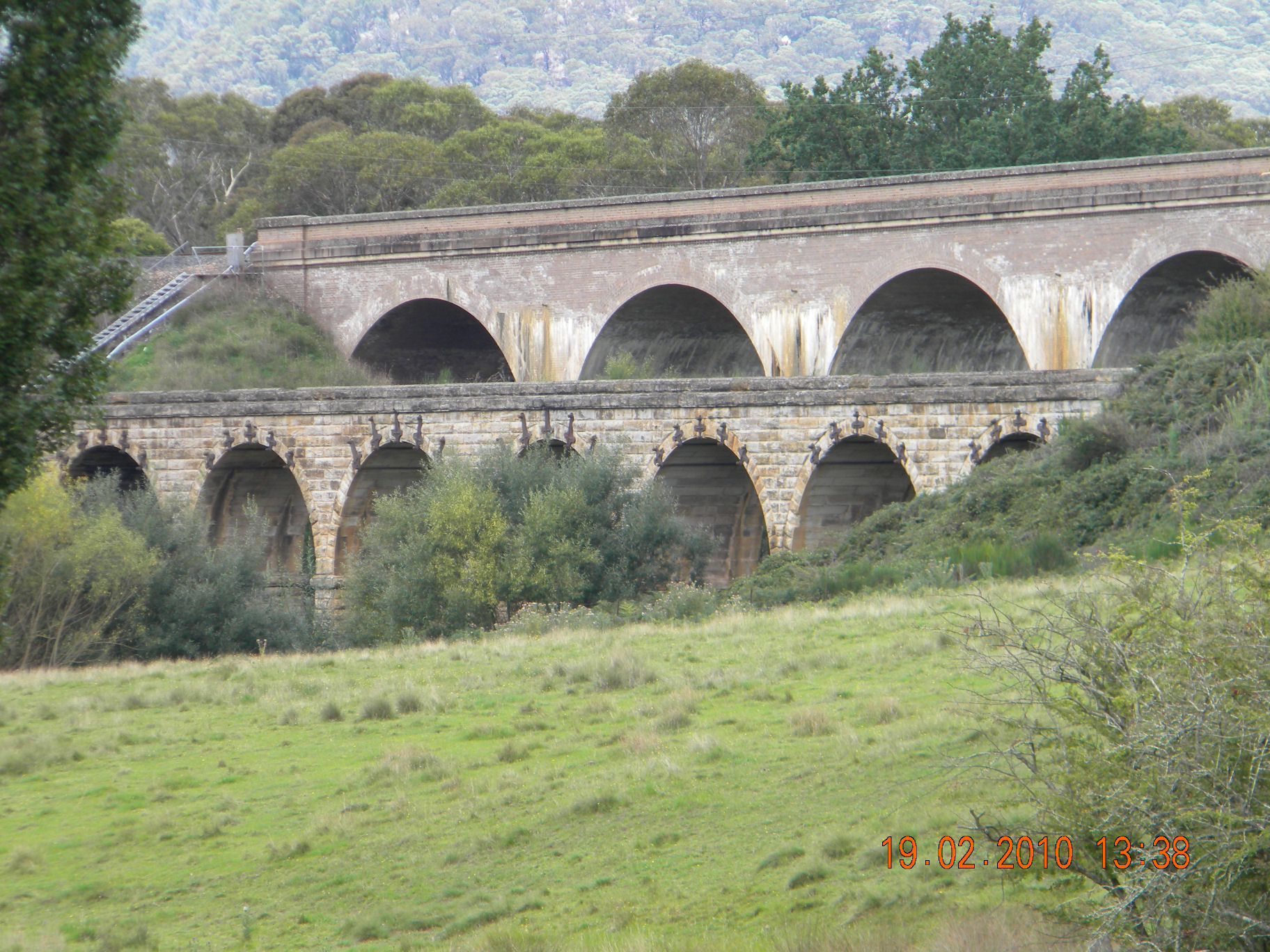
- The two viaducts, with the 1870 stone viaduct in the foreground and the 1921 brick viaduct in the background; pictured in 2010
- Coordinates: 33°28′22″S 150°07′38″E
- Carries: Main Western Line
- Crosses: Farmers Creek
- Locale: Bowenfels, City of Lithgow, New South Wales, Australia: 159.156 kilometres (99 mi) from Central station
- Owner: Transport Asset Manager of New South Wales

Characteristics
- Design: Arch viaduct
- Material: Sydney sandstone (1870); Brick (1921)
- No. of spans: 9 (1870); 6 (1921)

Rail characteristics
- No. of tracks: 1 (1870); 2 (1921)
- Track gauge: 4 ft 8 1/2 in (1,435 mm) standard gauge

History
- Designer: John Whitton; Engineer-in-Chief for Railways (1870); Engineering staff of NSWGR (1921)
- Construction start: 1870
- Construction end: 1921

New South Wales Heritage Register
- Official name: Bowenfels rail viaducts; Farmers Creek viaducts
- Type: State heritage (built)
- Designated: 2 April 1999
- Reference no.: 1028
- Type: Railway Bridge/Viaduct
- Category: Transport – Rail

Location
- Interactive map of Bowenfels rail viaducts

The Bowenfels rail viaducts are a series of heritage-listed railway viaducts and railway bridges over Farmers Creek on the Main Western Line at Bowenfels, in the Central West region of New South Wales, Australia. It was designed in two stages, by John Whitton as the Engineer-in-Chief for Railways, in 1870; and by engineering staff of New South Wales Government Railways in 1921; and was built from 1870 to 1921. It is also known as Farmers Creek viaducts. The property is owned by Transport Asset Manager of New South Wales, an agency of the Government of New South Wales. It was added to the New South Wales State Heritage Register on 2 April 1999. The viaduct are located approximately 159 kilometres (99 mi) west of Central railway station.

== History ==
The Farmers Creek stone railway viaduct, immediately upstream of the 1921 brick viaduct, was built for the Lithgow to Bathurst single-track railway extension, 1869–1875. It is one of the oldest railway arch bridges in New South Wales but was bypassed by the 1921 double-track brick arch bridges.

By the early 1900s the original single track from Bowenfels to Wallerawang was inadequate for railway operations so plans were made to duplicate that section of line and at the same time ease the grades and flatten some curves. John Whitton chose to use stone arch construction when denied sufficient funds to use imported wrought iron girders. Economic constraints forced Whitton to build single track bridges. They were progressively bypassed by double track brick arch bridges.

A major programme of similar works was begun in 1910 and continued until the mid 1920s but, because steel was an expensive import from Britain, the dominant material for bridging the many waterways was bricks, mostly from the 1912 State Brickworks at Homebush and mostly in the form of large brick arch culverts and viaducts. The quantity of bricks used in the program was enormous and the period could be aptly described as the "era of the brick arch".

The Bowenfels to Wallerawang work was delayed until after World War I.

The viaducts over Farmers Creek are accessible from a local road that was the original Great Western Highway.

== Description ==
=== 1870 rail viaduct ===
A sandstone viaduct built for the original single track Great Western Railway over Farmers Creek west of Bowenfels Railway Station. There are nine semi-circular arches 1 metre (2 ft) thick. The piers are solid stone, founded at shallow depth into rock. At the piers, the internal "V" formed by the adjoining arches is filled by stone rubble to about 5 metres (15 ft) and dished to form a drain. By this arrangement the ballasted tracks are drained and do not get water logged. There is a low stone parapet wall on each side of the viaduct. The abutments are solid stonework.

=== 1921 rail viaduct ===
A brick arch viaduct comprising six 12.2-metre (40 ft) clear spans plus brick wing walls.

=== Condition ===
As at 16 March 2006, the viaducts are in good condition.

== Heritage listing ==
As at 16 March 2006, this 1870 viaduct is significant because it is one of the oldest stone arch railway viaducts in New South Wales. It is associated with John Whitton the "father of New South Wales railways", it is an impressive curved sandstone structure on the edge of historic Bowenfels, its construction contributed significantly to the subsequent railway extension to Bathurst and on to western New South Wales and when John Whitton was denied funds to continue with the expensive wrought iron girder bridges he chose the stone arch viaduct for his major bridge works, particularly for the Zig Zag east of Lithgow and the extension west to Wallerawang. It is a fine representative example of a stone arch railway viaduct and it retains its original fabric.

The 1921 viaduct is considered significant because it is part of the Bowenfels to Wallerawang duplication, the last of such works commonly used brick arch construction, the curved viaducts, 1870 and 1921, are all pairs of structures on the outskirts of historic Bowenfels, the duplication work contributed significantly to the railway extension to Bathurst and to the continued development of Western New South Wales, for land transport to Sydney and with six 12.2-metre (40 ft) clear spans on tall brick piers, it is one of the largest brick arch structures on the New South Wales railways system. The viaduct is used as a representative example of brick arch construction and retains its original fabric and structure.

Bowenfels Rail Viaducts was listed on the New South Wales State Heritage Register on 2 April 1999 having satisfied the following criteria.

The place possesses uncommon, rare or endangered aspects of the cultural or natural history of New South Wales.

This item is assessed as historically rare. This item is assessed as scientifically rare. This item is assessed as arch rare. This item is assessed as socially rare.

== See also ==
- Historic bridges of New South Wales
- List of railway bridges in New South Wales
