= Hokesville =

Fake town built in World War II

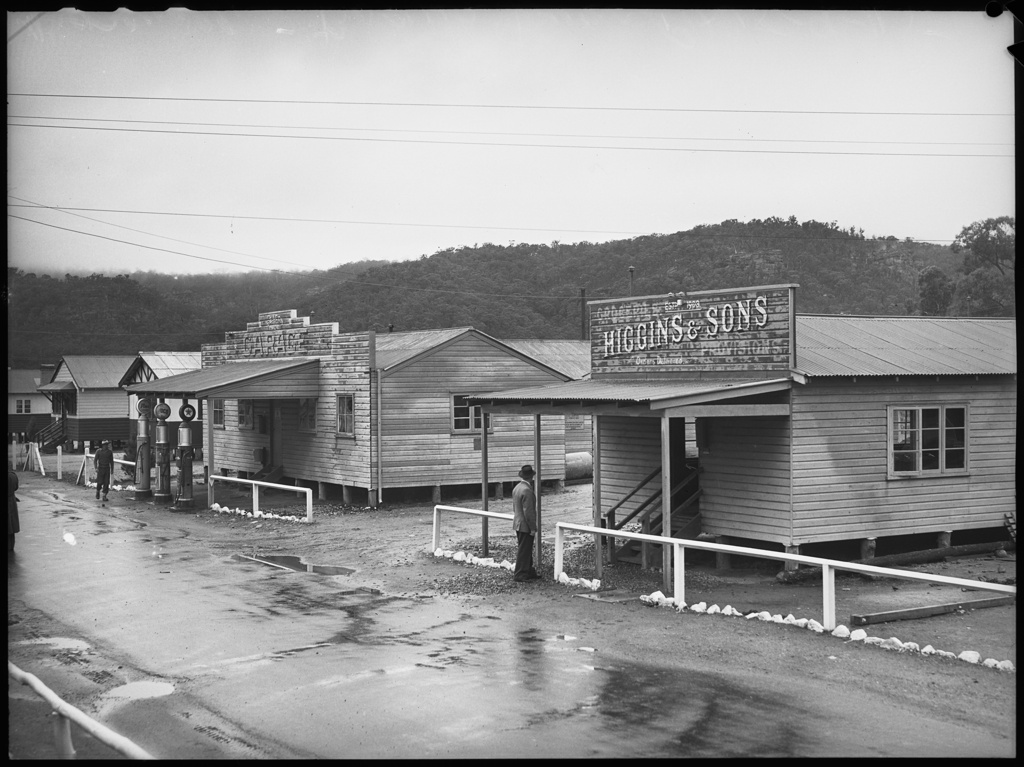
The "main street" of Hokesville

Hokesville (also known as Hoaxville) was a fake town in the Blue Mountains of New South Wales, Australia, built during World War II as camouflage for a RAAF weapons storage site. It had no actual residents as such but was regularly attended by a "floating population" of Australian military servicemen during the war. The official name for the Hokesville base in reality was No. 1 Central Reserve and Army Ordnance.

Hokesville was constructed in April 1942 on the western slopes of the Blue Mountains, at a site near Marrangaroo. It was the location of a pre-existing large disused railway tunnel which the RAAF determined would be ideal for storing its stockpile of chemical weapons, including phosgene and mustard gas. The tunnel was renovated with concrete floors, electricity and telephones. Real farms and homesteads lay adjacent to the site, along with an old stone church. An average of 6,000 tonnes of bombs passed in and out of the base each month, with 12,000 at its peak in May 1945.

Fears of reconnaissance missions or even air strikes from Japanese planes led to much effort being taken to disguise Hokesville as a functioning town. Real cattle and horses were allowed to graze in the area, and dogs were trained to guard the entrance of the tunnel. A fake horse was also constructed out of papier mache. Numerous fake residences featured porches set up with deck chairs. Empty buildings purporting to be that of various local business were constructed, many with elaborate entrance signs painted for them. These included Higgins & Sons Groceries, Alf Jones' Butcher (with "Alf" being a play on "AIF", the abbreviation for the Australian Imperial Force), Ryan's Hotel, the Beacon Garage complete with gas pumps and even a Hokesville branch of the YMCA.

Once the war ended, the reality of Hokesville was revealed to the Australian public and photographers were invited to document the site. The Hobart Mercury reported that the "lethal liquid and gases probably will be taken out to sea, where the ocean is particularly deep, and dumped." In 2005, it was revealed the chemicals had in fact been buried and left at the site. A remediation project ran from 2008 to 2010, revealing thousands of bomb cases, projectiles, fuses and other military ordnance in the soil.

In 2019, an art installation inspired by Hokesville was displayed as part of the Resilience in Times of Adversity: Contemporary Responses to WW2 in the Blue Mountains 1939–1950 exhibition at the Blue Mountains Cultural Centre in Katoomba.

== Gallery ==
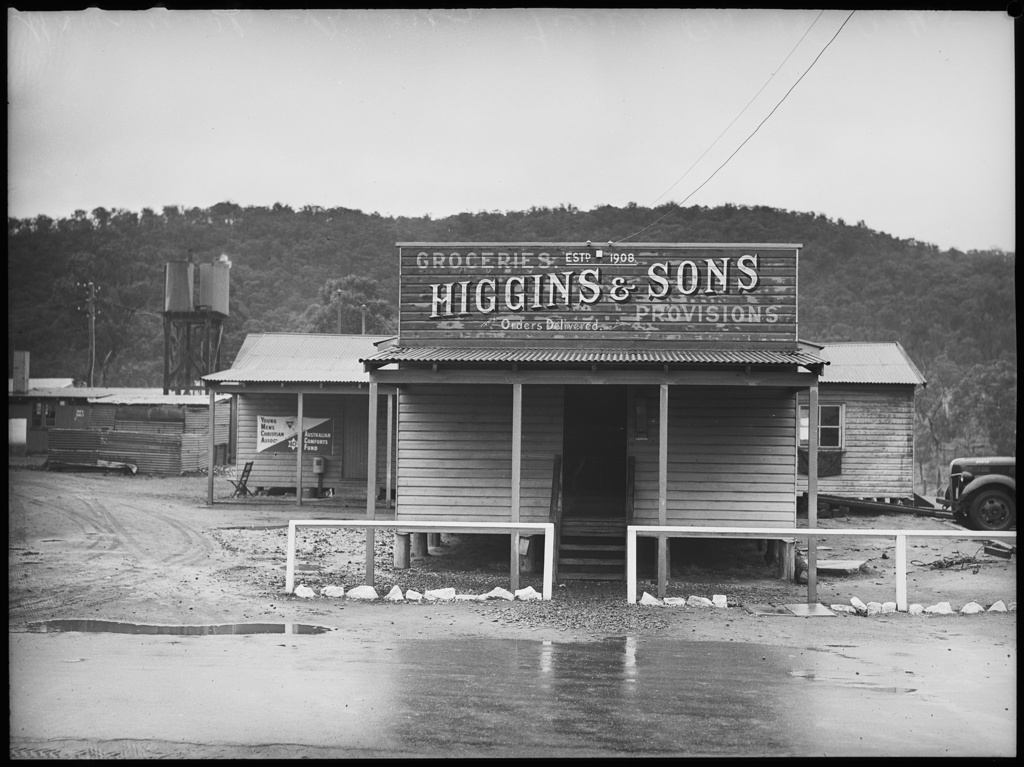
Higgins & Sons Grocers, and the YMCA.

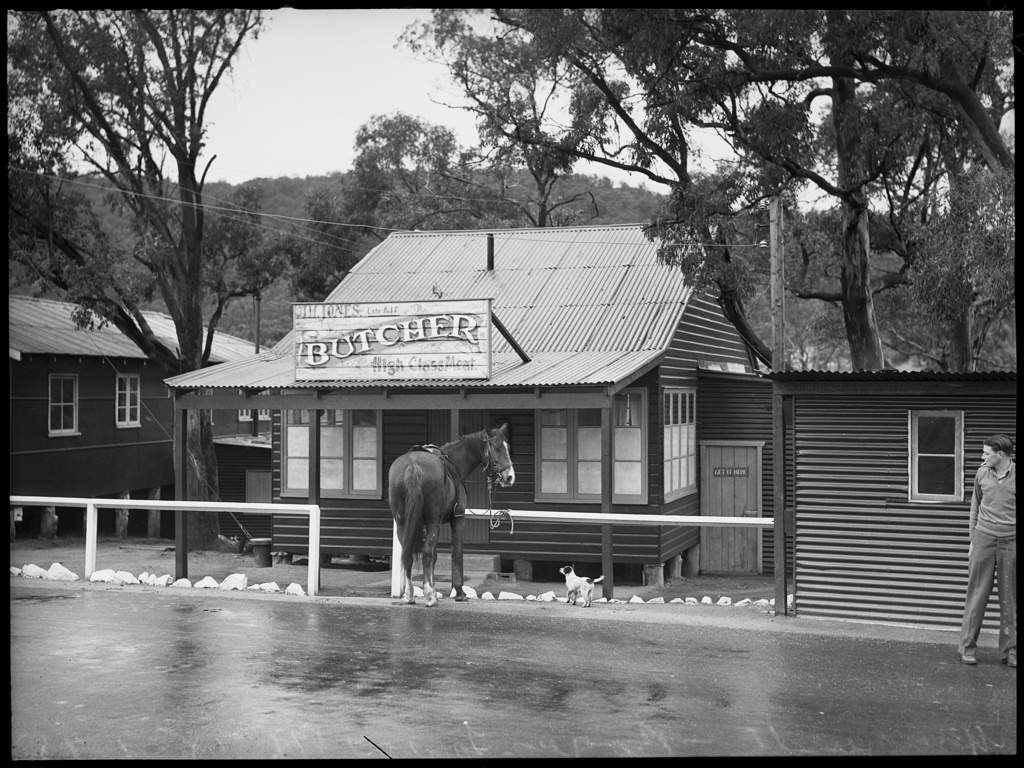
Alf Jones' butcher, plus horse mounted outside.

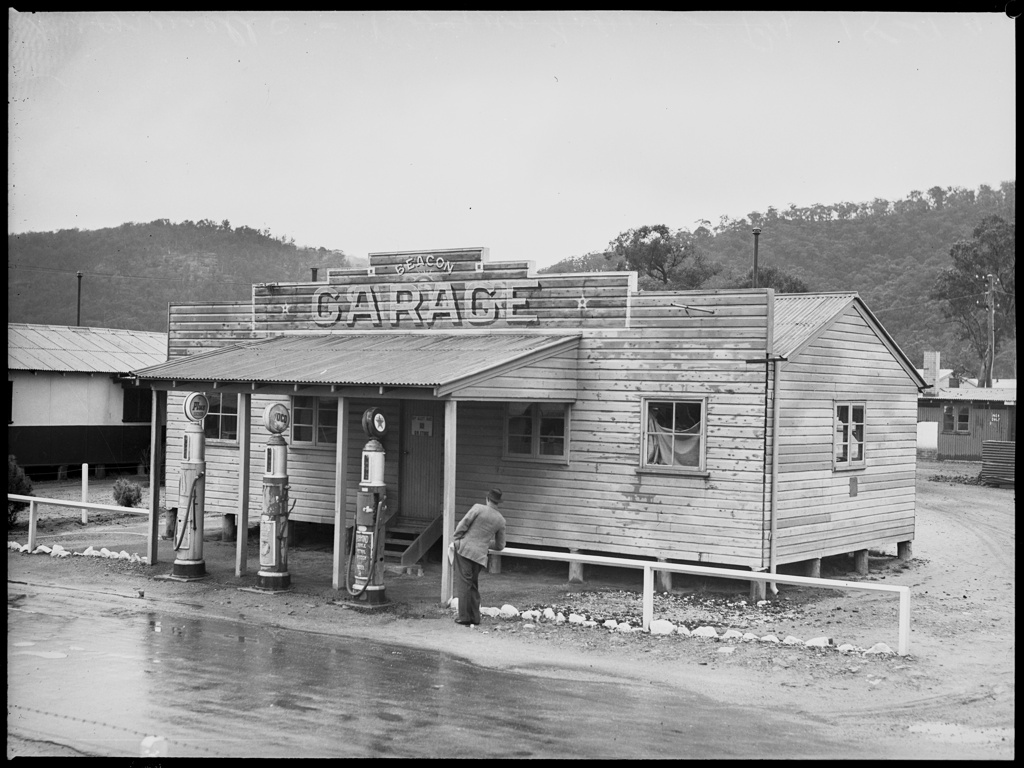
Beacon Garage, complete with gas pumps.

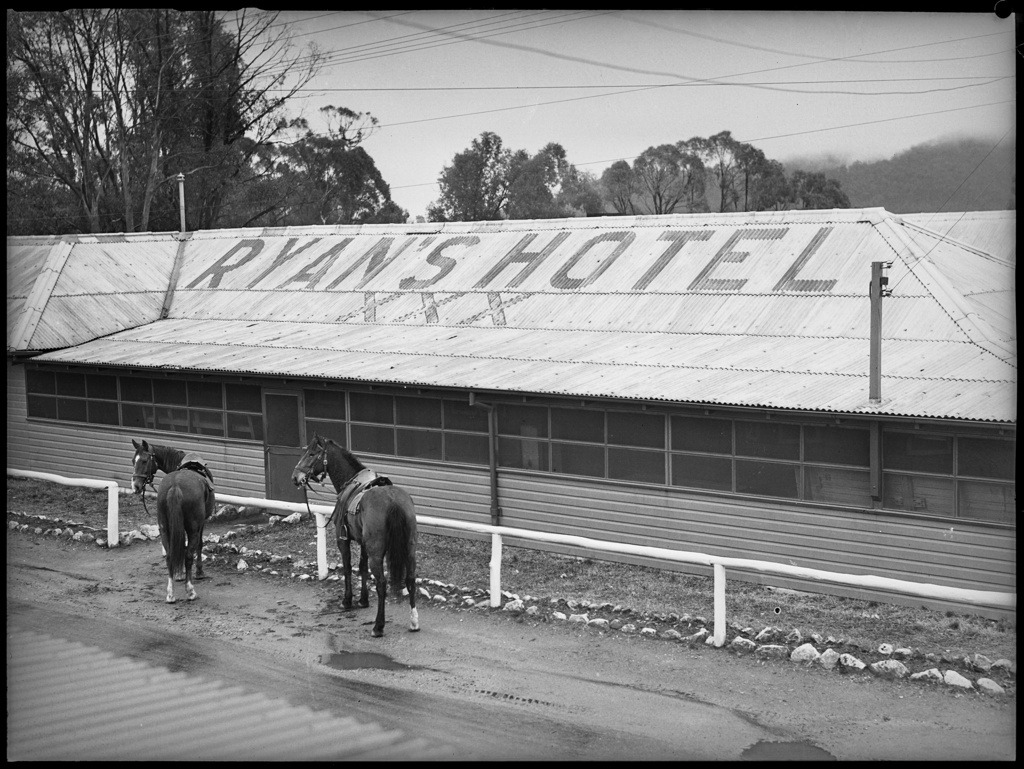
Ryan's Hotel, plus two horses.

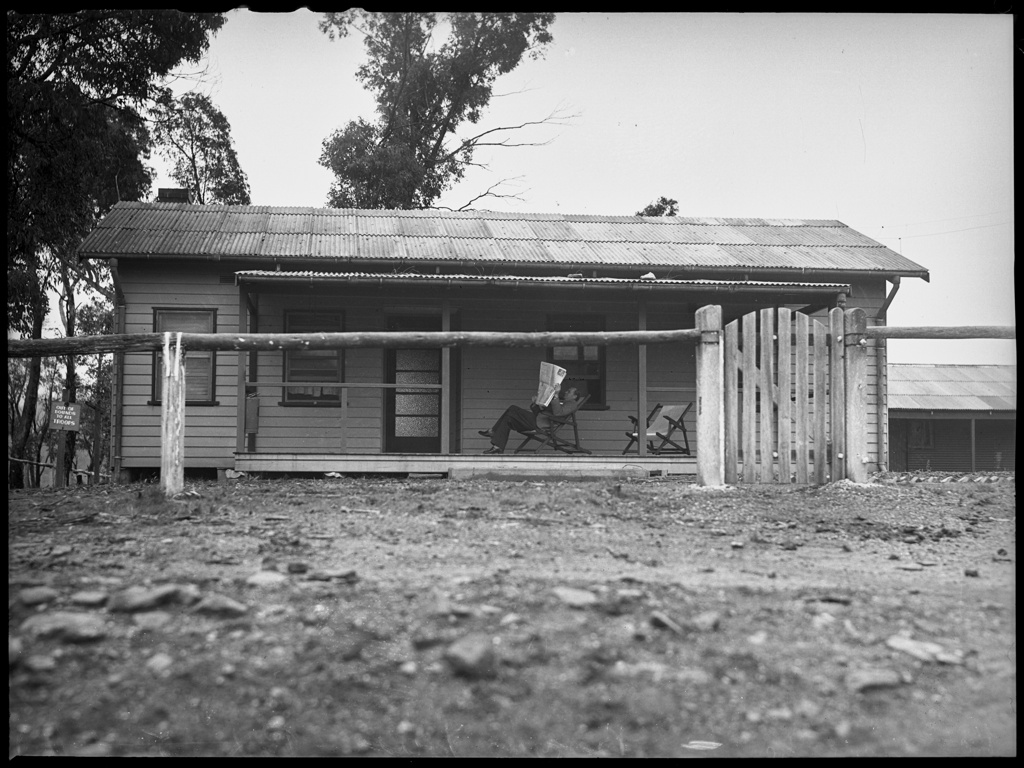
A house, featuring deck chairs on the porch.

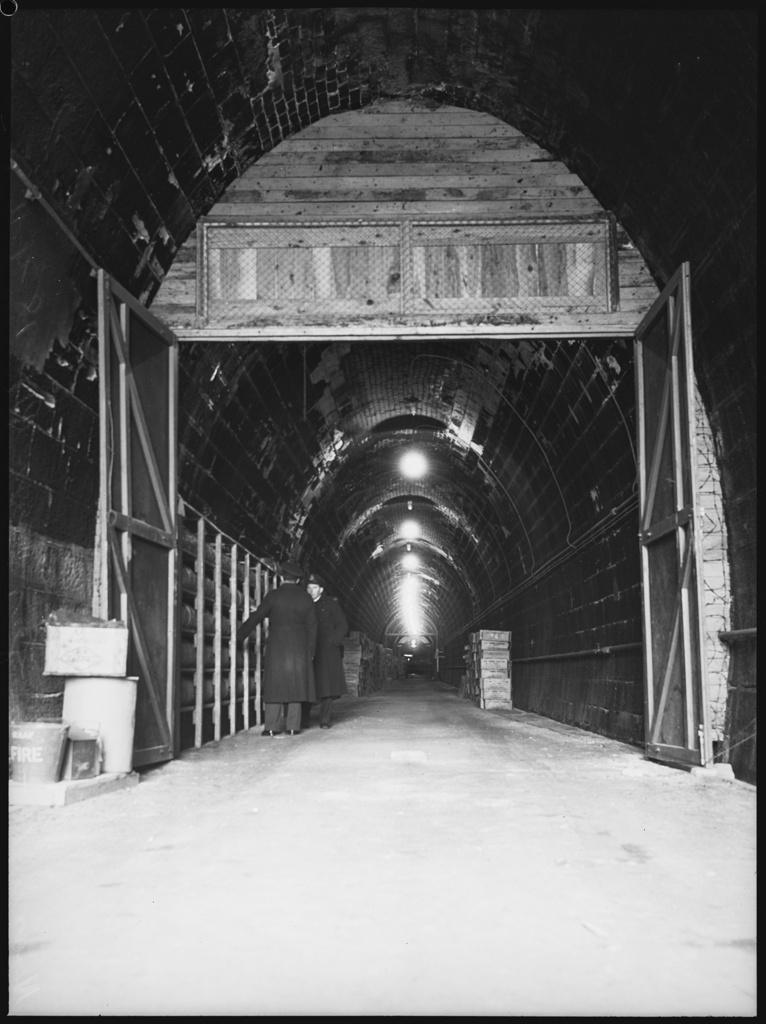
Tunnel entrance.

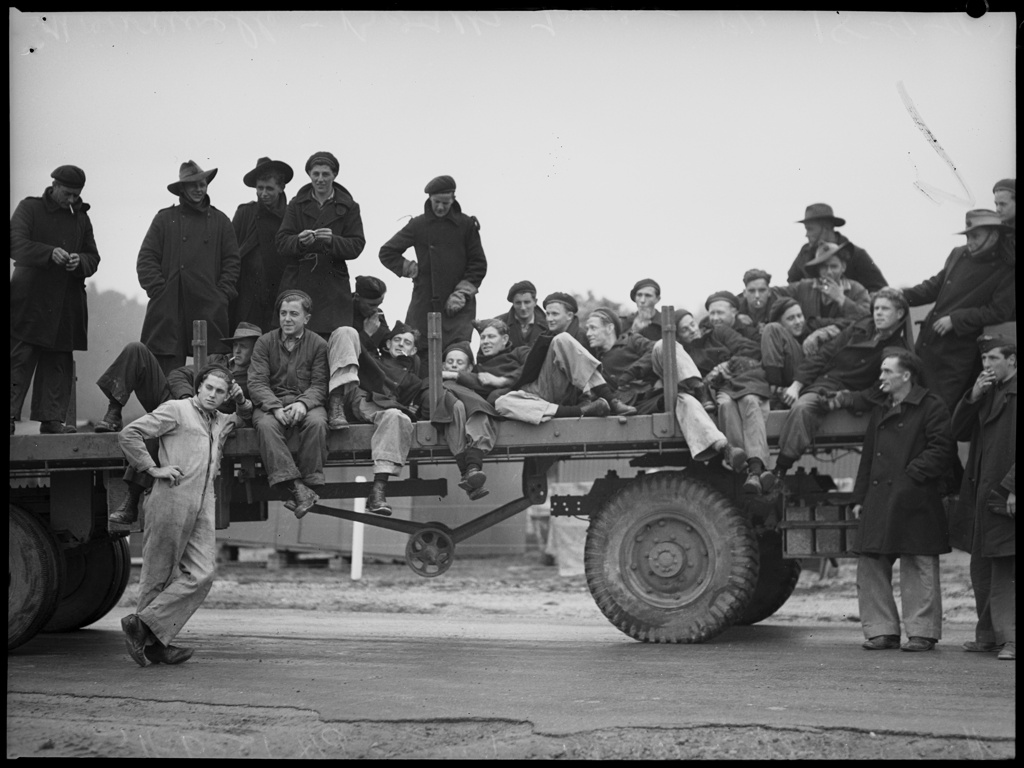
RAAF servicemen at the site, the actual "population" of Hokesville.

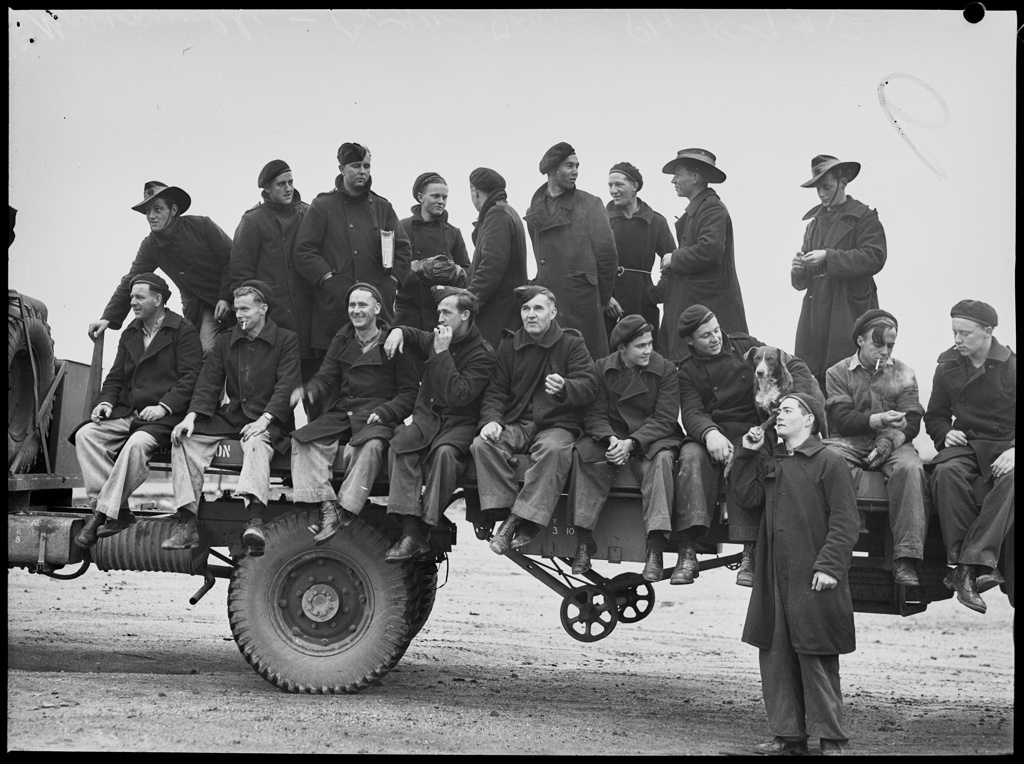
More RAAF servicemen, plus guard dog.
