= Fern Hill, Tacoma, Washington =

Historic neighborhood

Coordinates: 47°10′51.4″N 122°25′55.7″W

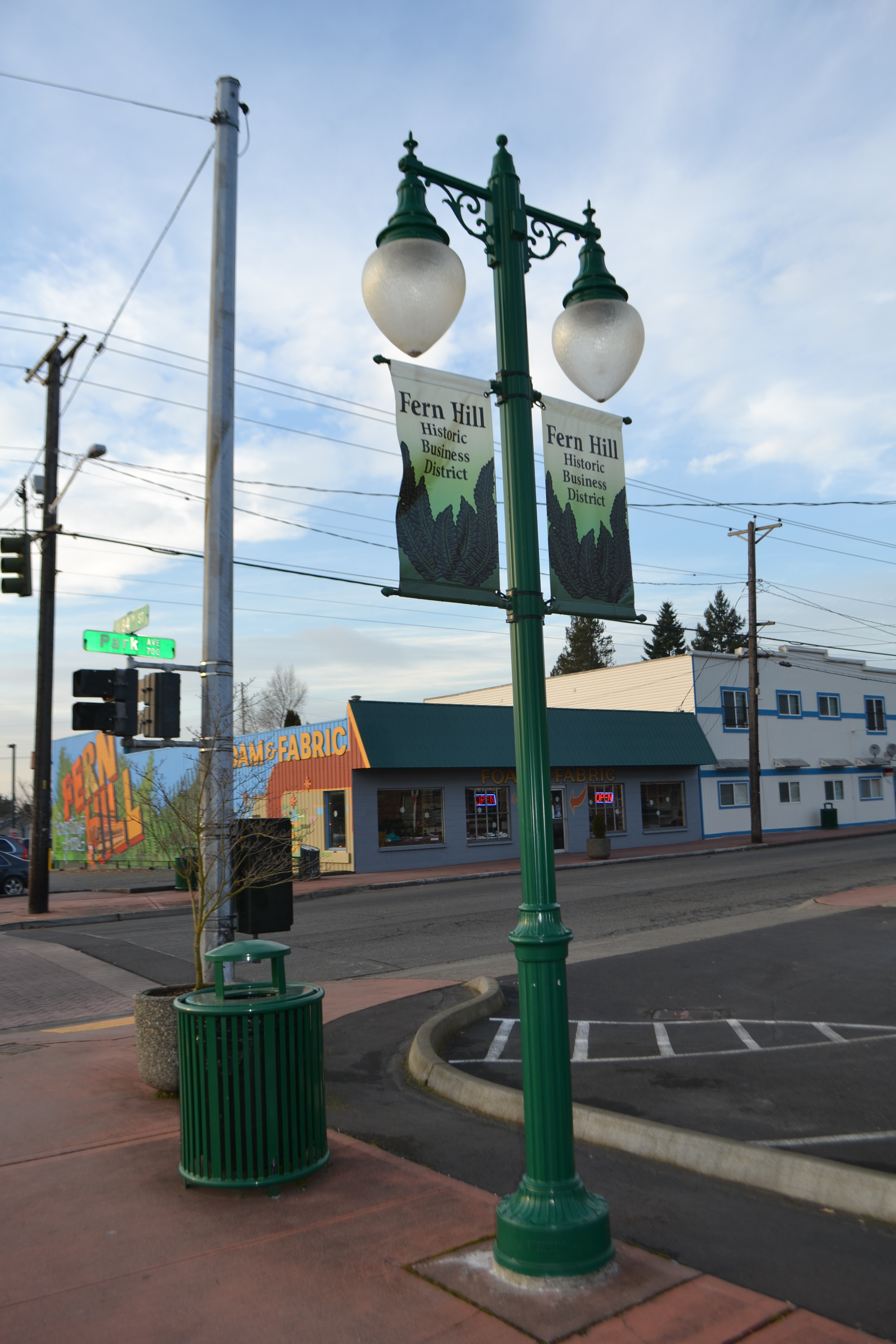

Fern Hill is a neighborhood located in the southern part of Tacoma, Washington, United States. It is generally defined as extending west from the intersection of S 84th and Pacific Avenue to South Thompson St.

The neighborhood's central hub is the intersection of South 84th and Park Avenue. Fern Hill's central business district contains several small shops. The neighborhood also includes a public library branch, and Fern hill elementary school built circa early 1900s and a large church as well as several stately historic homes.

Fern Hill is one of the oldest communities in the city. The neighborhood's history, and having three parks within four blocks of the neighboring business district, has helped contribute to the growing population. The Fern hill neighborhood has one of the highest population densities in the city of Tacoma.
