= Fernhill, Bowenfels =

Fernhill
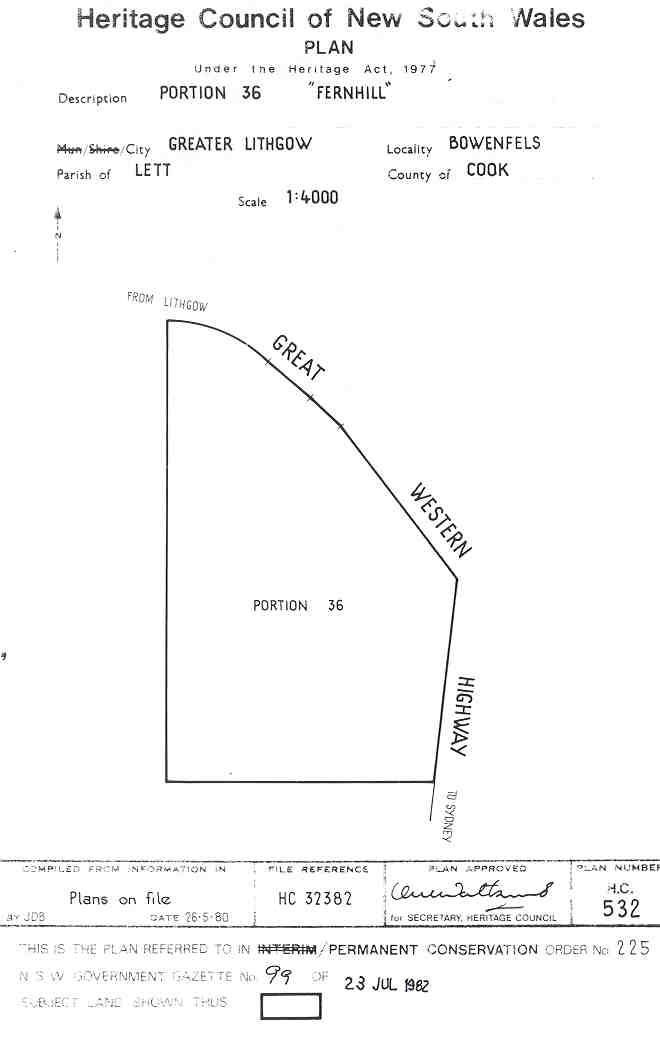
- Heritage boundaries

- Location within New South Wales Location within Australia
- 33°31′29″S 150°09′06″E
- Location: Great Western Highway, Bowenfels, City of Lithgow, New South Wales, Australia

History
- Built: 1856–1859

Site notes
- Owner: National Trust of Australia (NSW)

New South Wales Heritage Register
- Official name: Fernhill; Australia Arms Inn
- Type: State heritage (built)
- Designated: 2 April 1999
- Reference no.: 225
- Type: Inn/Tavern
- Category: Commercial
- Builders: John Blackman

Fernhill is an Australian heritage-listed house and former inn in the Blue Mountains. Located beside the Great Western Highway in Bowenfels, New South Wales, It was built from 1856 to 1859 by John Blackman. The property, also known as Australia Arms Inn, was formerly owned by the National Trust of Australia (NSW). It was added to the New South Wales State Heritage Register on 2 April 1999. On 18 July 2019 it was sold to a private buyer as a residential property.

== History ==
The original land grant was issued to William Dwyer in 1837 for Portion 36, Parish Lett and County Cook. In 1856, Portion 36 was purchased by John Blackman. Between 1856 and 1858 the extant Fernhill complex was constructed and was known as the Australia Arms Inn.

John Blackman died in 1860 and his widow Elizabeth operated it as an inn until 1873, after which time she lived in it as her home and renamed it Fernhill House. After her death the property passed into the joint ownership of Richard Merrick (Blackman's nephew) and her nephew, James Peacock.

From 1910 to the 1950s their descendants continued to live in the property. Eva Merrick died in 1970 and bequeathed her portion and its contents to the National Trust of Australia (NSW). After protracted and financial negotiations the National Trust acquired the remaining shares in 1982.

== Description ==
Fernhill is a single storey dressed stone building with ten rooms on the ground floor, four attic rooms and a cellar under the store room. The double pitched and hipped roof has a longitudinal valley and covered stepped verandah roof to three sides. The entrance door is six panelled with diagonally glazed sidelights and fanlight. Internal doors are four panel doors. Windows are six paned sash type. French doors lead off to the verandah. All joinery throughout is cedar. There are four fine stone fireplaces, one plain and three with well carved leaf, flower and acorn motifs. The timber shingled roof remains under the corrugated iron sheeting. The former bar has built-in cupboards with small paned glass doors while other door fanlights are rectangular small panes. The kitchen wing forms a separate brick wing and comprises a large centre kitchen with ovens, fireplace, dining room and laundry, linked to the main house by a single verandah. The stables are in the form of a large rectangular building constructed of rubble sandstone and dressed quoins and lintels. The doorways are spanned by well-designed three-centred arches, the centre one leading to the coach space and the others to stable and feed and harness room with hayloft over. In the grounds there is a stone privy. The rubble front fence is built from stones of John Blackman's house in the Hartley Valley. The land comprises 15 hectares (37 acres) of predominantly cleared grazing land with a gently undulating fall from the road commencing from behind the barn. There are many fine mature trees in the grounds.

=== Condition ===
Physical condition is fair. Archaeological potential is medium.

=== Modifications and dates ===
Between 1856 and 1858 the inn complex was constructed. The initial complex included and inn, stables, privy and kitchen block. Between 1910 and the 1930s additional timber outbuildings and services for the separate portions of the property were constructed. An iron garage was constructed c. 1930s. A new stone fence was built on the front boundary c. 1934. In 1940 a spring fed dam was constructed and the garden was enlarged. c. 1950. Construction of a new bathroom between the kitchen wing and the main building took place c. 1950 and the kitchen was moved to the main building.

== Heritage listing ==
As at 1 October 1997, Fernhill is of State significance as an inn dating from the mid-nineteenth century that once formed a part of a chain of other inns stretching from Sydney to the Western Goldfields. It is significant as a group of well constructed buildings set in extensive grounds demonstrating the pattern of land settlement and travel during the late nineteenth century. Fernhill is significant for the collection of makeshift furniture made at and for Fernhill.

Fernhill was listed on the New South Wales State Heritage Register on 2 April 1999 having satisfied the following criteria.

The place is important in demonstrating the course, or pattern, of cultural or natural history in New South Wales.

Fernhill is historically significant because it once formed part of an important link in the chain of wayside inns that stretched from Sydney to the Western Goldfields. Together with other inns it is a major component of the pattern of land settlement, transport and travel that characterised development along the Western Road, from the crossing of the Blue Mountains in 1815 to the opening of the railway to Lithgow in the 1860s.

The place is important in demonstrating aesthetic characteristics and/or a high degree of creative or technical achievement in New South Wales.

Fernhill is of aesthetic significance because it is a well crafted early colonial Georgian roadside inn complete with fine stone barn and other outbuildings, situated in beautiful grounds.

The place has a strong or special association with a particular community or cultural group in New South Wales for social, cultural or spiritual reasons.

Fernhill is of social significance because it was built by a prominent family of early settlers in the district. It is also associated with major families in its district, that have been resident in the Lithgow, Bowenfels, Hartley area from the early eighteenth century to present, and who have a continuing association and concern about the welfare of Fernhill.

The place has potential to yield information that will contribute to an understanding of the cultural or natural history of New South Wales.

Fernhill is of research significance for the wealth of information available about the place, through primary documents, through recollections of the associated family and particularly through the building fabric furniture, contents, garden and grounds.

== See also ==
- Australian residential architectural styles
