= South Bowenfels =

- Town
- Coordinates: 33°33′S 150°11′E
- Country: Australia
- State: New South Wales
- LGA: City of Lithgow
- Location: 140 km (87 mi) WNW of Sydney; 5 km (3.1 mi) SW of Lithgow; 64 km (40 mi) E of Bathurst; 32 km (20 mi) NW of Katoomba

Government
  - State electorate: Bathurst
  - Federal division: Calare
- Elevation: 950 m (3,120 ft)
- Postcode: 2790
Localities around South Bowenfels
Bowenfels	Lithgow
South Bowenfels	Hartley Vale
Mount Blaxland	Hartley

South Bowenfels is a suburb in the City of Lithgow, New South Wales, Australia.

== History ==
The suburb was previously known as Old Bowenfels.

== Heritage listings ==
Old Bowenfels has a number of heritage-listed sites, including:

- 70 Mudgee Street: Bowenfels National School Site
