= Fernhill School, Farnborough =

Coordinates: 51.3153°N 0.7694°W

Bohunt Farnborough

Location
- Neville Duke Road; Farnborough, Hampshire, GU14 9BY; England

Information
- Type: Community school
- Local authority: Hampshire County Council
- Department for Education URN: 149712 Tables
- Ofsted: Reports
- Headteacher: Daryl Bond
- Gender: Coeducational
- Age: 11 to 16
- Website: https://www.bohuntfarnborough.com/

Bohunt Farnborough (formerly Fernhill School) is a coeducational secondary school located in Farnborough in the English county of Hampshire.

It is a community school administered by Hampshire County Council. The school previously held specialist status as a Language College and was known as Fernhill School & Language College. In April 2016 the school changed its name to simply 'Fernhill School' due to the ending of the specialist schools programme.

In 2022, the school had been rated inadequate after inspectors found homophobic bullying "occurred frequently". The inspectors also said pupils' behaviour often disrupted lessons and safeguarding measures were ineffective.
