= Marrangaroo =

- Town
- Interactive map of Marrangaroo
- Coordinates: 33°26′0″S 150°07′0″E
- Country: Australia
- State: New South Wales
- LGA: City of Lithgow
- Location: 153 km (95 mi) WNW of Sydney; 57 km (35 mi) E of Bathurst; 5 km (3.1 mi) NW of Lithgow

Government
  - State electorate: Bathurst
  - Federal division: Calare
- Elevation: 1,200 m (3,900 ft)

Population
  - Total: 909 (2016 census)
- Postcode: 2790
- Mean max temp: 19.1 °C (66.4 °F)
- Mean min temp: 6.3 °C (43.3 °F)
- Annual rainfall: 786.9 mm (30.98 in)
Localities around Marrangaroo
Wallerawang	Lidsdale
Mount Lambie	Marrangaroo	Lithgow
Rydal	Bowenfels	Lithgow

Marrangaroo is a village in the Central West of New South Wales, Australia in the City of Lithgow. The name is also applied to the surrounding area, for postal and statistical purposes.

== Overview ==
Marrangaroo is located a few kilometres west of Lithgow. It is accessible from the Great Western Highway, and has no railway station and little bus services. Lithgow Buslines run buses between Lithgow and Bathurst, which make limited stops at Marrangaroo on the Great Western Highway. A main feature of Marrangaroo was the Trout Farm which was opposite the Lithgow Correctional Centre. At the 2016 census, Marrangaroo had a population of 909.

The area in the north-east of the Marrangaroo bounded locality is now a part of the Gardens of Stone State Conservation Area.

== Military ==
Empty 110 kg (250 lb) bombs

Marrangaroo Army Camp, situated at the end of Reserve Road, used to be a major ammunition depot from 1941 to the late 1980s. It was served by a three kilometre siding that branched off from the Main Western railway line from March 1942 until May 1988. It is now used for demolitions and various training by all three Australian Defence Force services. During World War II, a "town" was constructed nearby named Hokesville that was in fact a decoy for an RAAF chemical weapons storage site. Marrangaroo was the administration headquarters for all of the Royal Australian Air Force Chemical Weapon Stores. These were located at the Hokesville site (old tunnel and siding near correctional centre), Glenbrook Tunnel, Clarence Tunnel (that is now part of the Lithgow Zig Zag) and Picton tunnel in Sydney's south.

During an interview with Plunkett in 2005, chemical warfare armourer, Geoff Burn mentioned he had been involved in the burial of 110-kilogram (250 lb) phosgene bombs near the entrance to the headquarters in 1943. He was subsequently recalled from Cairns in 1944 to identify the site but was unsure as to whether and if the bombs had been extracted. After Burn marked the site on an aerial map a ground search revealed they were still there. The legacy of these weapons remains with several hundred empty chemical munition containers being found buried at Marrangaroo Army Camp from May 2008 to February 2009.

A remediation project to remove heavy metal contamination started in November 2008 with a secondary task to remove any more buried chemical munitions. The revelation of Marrangaroo's history sparked significant local media interest. The Department of Defence established a website for community consultation and feedback on the decontamination.

== Transport ==
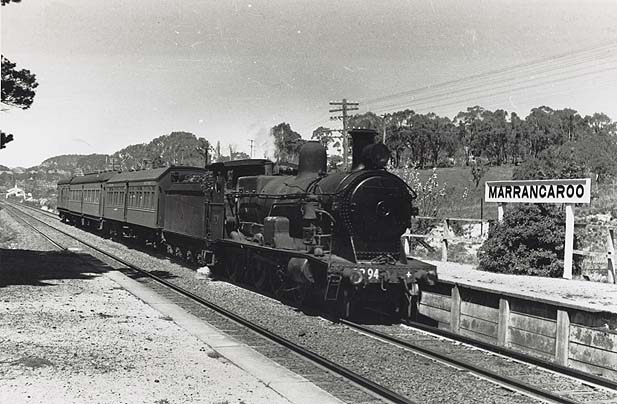
Marrangaroo station c. 1950s.

A railway station opened at Marrangaroo on the Main Western line in 1878 and closed in 1974. Little trace of it remains. Also, it has been suggested as the western terminus for the proposed Bells Line Expressway; however, it is unlikely to proceed.

Preceding station	Former services	Following station
Wallerawang towards Bourke	Main Western Line	Bowenfels towards Sydney

== Shale oil ==
During the 1870s, there was an oil shale mine at 'Bathgate', probably named after Bathgate, in Scotland, which was the site of a shale oil industry. 'Bathgate' lay on Dr Mackenzie's property, about a mile from the Main Western railway line at the point where it passed through the original Marrangaroo tunnel. The operation at 'Bathgate' was ultimately unsuccessful, although more oil shale was discovered, about a mile away, in 1888.

During the calendar years 1943 to 1945 inclusive, Lithgow Oil Proprietary Ltd, at Marrangaroo, produced around 2,000,000 gallons of crude shale oil. Under wartime conditions, that company had designed and constructed its own NTU retorts based on information from a Bureau of Mines publication. The crude shale oil was refined at the Glen Davis Shale Oil Works. The Marrangaroo oil shale deposit was small but exceptionally rich, assaying 237 US gallons per long ton.

== Heritage listings ==
Marrangaroo has a number of heritage-listed sites, including:

- Main Western railway: Marrangaroo railway viaduct
