= Wallerawang =

- Town
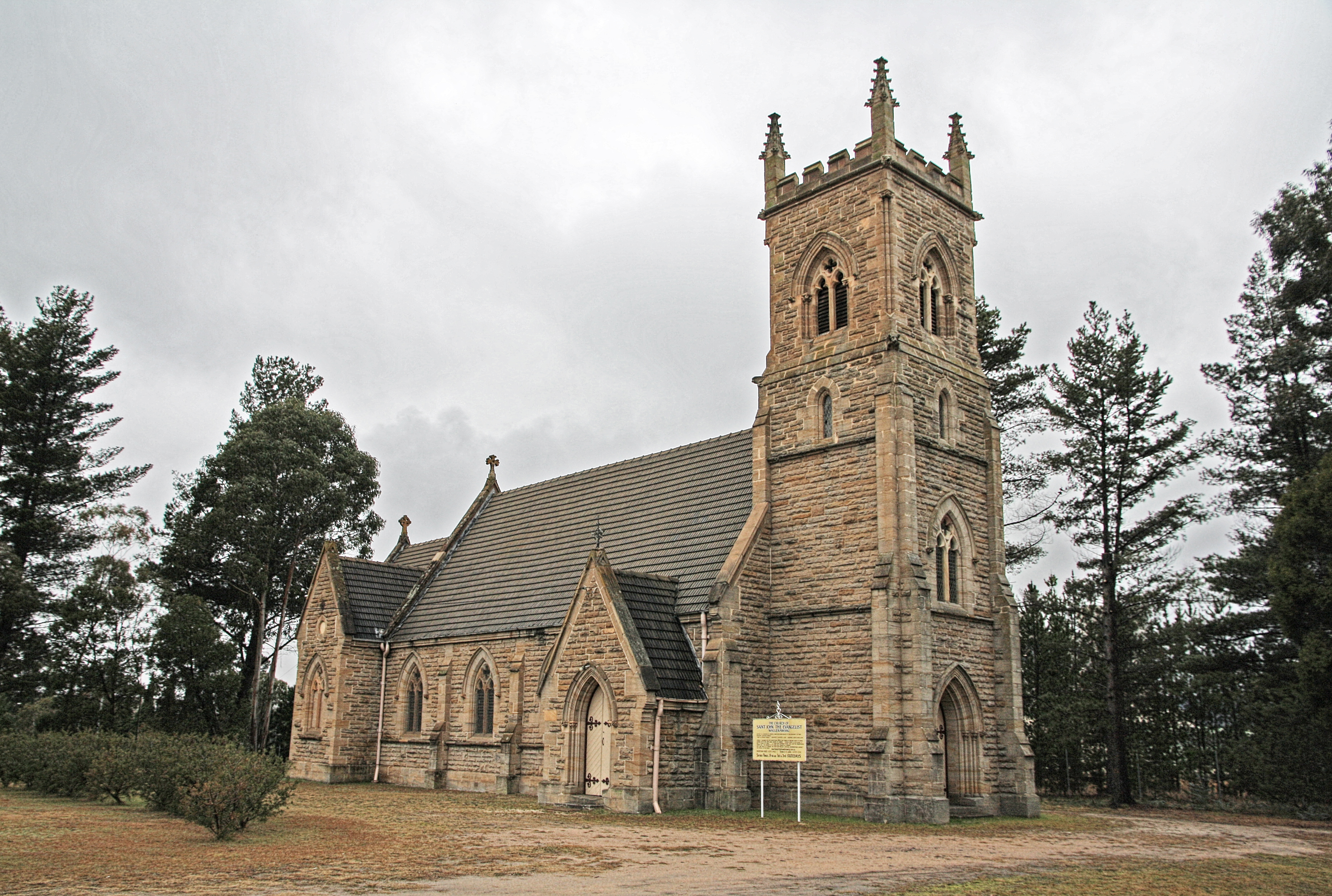
- St John the Evangelist Church, built 1881

- Interactive map of Wallerawang
- Coordinates: 33°24′40″S 150°03′50″E
- Country: Australia
- State: New South Wales
- Region: Central Tablelands
- LGA: City of Lithgow
- Location: 50 km (31 mi) E of Bathurst; 14 km (8.7 mi) NW of Lithgow; 115 km (71 mi) SSE of Mudgee; 158 km (98 mi) WNW of Sydney

Government
  - State electorate: Bathurst
  - Federal division: Calare
- Elevation: 890 m (2,920 ft)

Population
  - Total: 1,980 (2016)
- County: Australia
- Mean max temp: 29.1 °C (84.4 °F)
- Mean min temp: 14.4 °C (57.9 °F)
- Annual rainfall: 391.8 mm (15.43 in)
Localities around Wallerawang
| Portland | Lidsdale |
| | Wallerawang | Marrangaroo |
| Mount Lambie | | Lithgow |

Wallerawang is a small township in the Central Tablelands of New South Wales, Australia. It is located approximately 14 kilometres (8.7 mi) northwest of Lithgow adjacent to the Great Western Highway. It is also located on the Main Western railway line at the junction of the Gwabegar line. The name is also applied to the surrounding area for postal and statistical purposes.

== History ==
The original inhabitants of the area west of the Blue Mountains were Wiradjuri Aboriginal Australians. It is believed they knew the area as Waller-owang. It is understood to mean a place near wood and water, or plenty of water. James Blackman was probably the first European to visit the area when he marked out the route of the new road from Bathurst to the area now known as Wallerawang.

In 1824, 11 years after the first exploration led by Blaxland over the Blue Mountains, Ethan Bell was granted a large portion of land in the area now known as Wallerawang. In 1836 the property was to become known as Barton Park.

Two of Bell's convict servants took up land leases in the area in the 1850s, one of them was Maddox who named his lease Lidsdale.

Charles Darwin, the English naturalist, stayed at "Wallerawang House" (later to become Barton Park) in 1836. Darwin describes the countryside around the Wallerawang area and the wildlife including Platypus in his book "The Voyage of the Beagle".

The local school has operated at three sites, in 1860 the first small stone school opened near the present power station, in 1882 the school relocated nearer the township and finally to its present location near Lake Wallace in 1995. The 1860 school, which is still standing, was opened by James Walker's widow.

The Church of St John the Evangelist, built in 1881, was financed by private funding. It was designed by architect Edmund Blacket, and is listed on the New South Wales State Heritage Register.

In the 1890s, the nearby Pipers Flat railway station was the proposed site for a large iron and steel works proposed by free-trade politician and businessman, Joseph Mitchell. It would have made use of local deposits of coal, limestone and iron ore. Although Mitchell won a government contract to supply iron and steel, he died before he could bring his plans to fruition.

In 1950-1951, extensive plans were made by the Joint Coal Board for a modern planned township at Wallerawang, which would have been the terminus of electrification of the railway from Sydney, the location of a new railway workshop and power station, and the transport hub for a major expansion of coal mining in the area. The Church of St John the Evangelist was to be relocated to a new location, to make way for the new development, and 1,200 cottages were to be erected. Apart from the Wallerawang Power Station and its associated mines, little came of these plans due to sustained opposition from political interests associated with nearby Lithgow.

== Climate ==
Due to its high elevation within the Central Tablelands, Wallerawang has a subtropical highland climate (Köppen: Cfb). The town experiences pleasant summers, cool winters and adequate precipitation year-round.

Climate data for Wallerawang (Lidsdale State Forest) (33.45°S 150.05°E, 975 m (3,199 ft) m AMSL) (1889-1985 data)
| Month | Jan | Feb | Mar | Apr | May | Jun | Jul | Aug | Sep | Oct | Nov | Dec | Year |
|---|---|---|---|---|---|---|---|---|---|---|---|---|---|
| Mean daily maximum °C (°F) | 24.6 (76.3) | 23.8 (74.8) | 21.7 (71.1) | 17.6 (63.7) | 13.3 (55.9) | 10.1 (50.2) | 9.5 (49.1) | 10.8 (51.4) | 14.6 (58.3) | 17.6 (63.7) | 20.3 (68.5) | 23.8 (74.8) | 17.3 (63.1) |
| Mean daily minimum °C (°F) | 11.4 (52.5) | 11.7 (53.1) | 10.1 (50.2) | 6.1 (43.0) | 3.0 (37.4) | 1.2 (34.2) | −0.3 (31.5) | 0.9 (33.6) | 2.7 (36.9) | 5.8 (42.4) | 7.8 (46.0) | 9.9 (49.8) | 5.9 (42.6) |
| Average precipitation mm (inches) | 108.5 (4.27) | 85.2 (3.35) | 71.2 (2.80) | 59.0 (2.32) | 66.2 (2.61) | 74.3 (2.93) | 52.2 (2.06) | 65.8 (2.59) | 59.4 (2.34) | 84.4 (3.32) | 74.1 (2.92) | 74.0 (2.91) | 874.6 (34.43) |
| Average precipitation days (≥ 0.2 mm) | 9.3 | 9.5 | 9.5 | 8.1 | 9.0 | 11.6 | 9.7 | 10.9 | 9.1 | 10.5 | 9.0 | 8.2 | 114.4 |
Source: Bureau of Meteorology (1938-1978 data)

== Heritage listings ==
Wallerawang has a number of heritage-listed sites, including:

- Main Street: St John the Evangelist Church, Wallerawang
- Main Western railway: Coxs River railway bridges, Wallerawang
- Main Western railway: Wallerawang railway station

== Railway ==
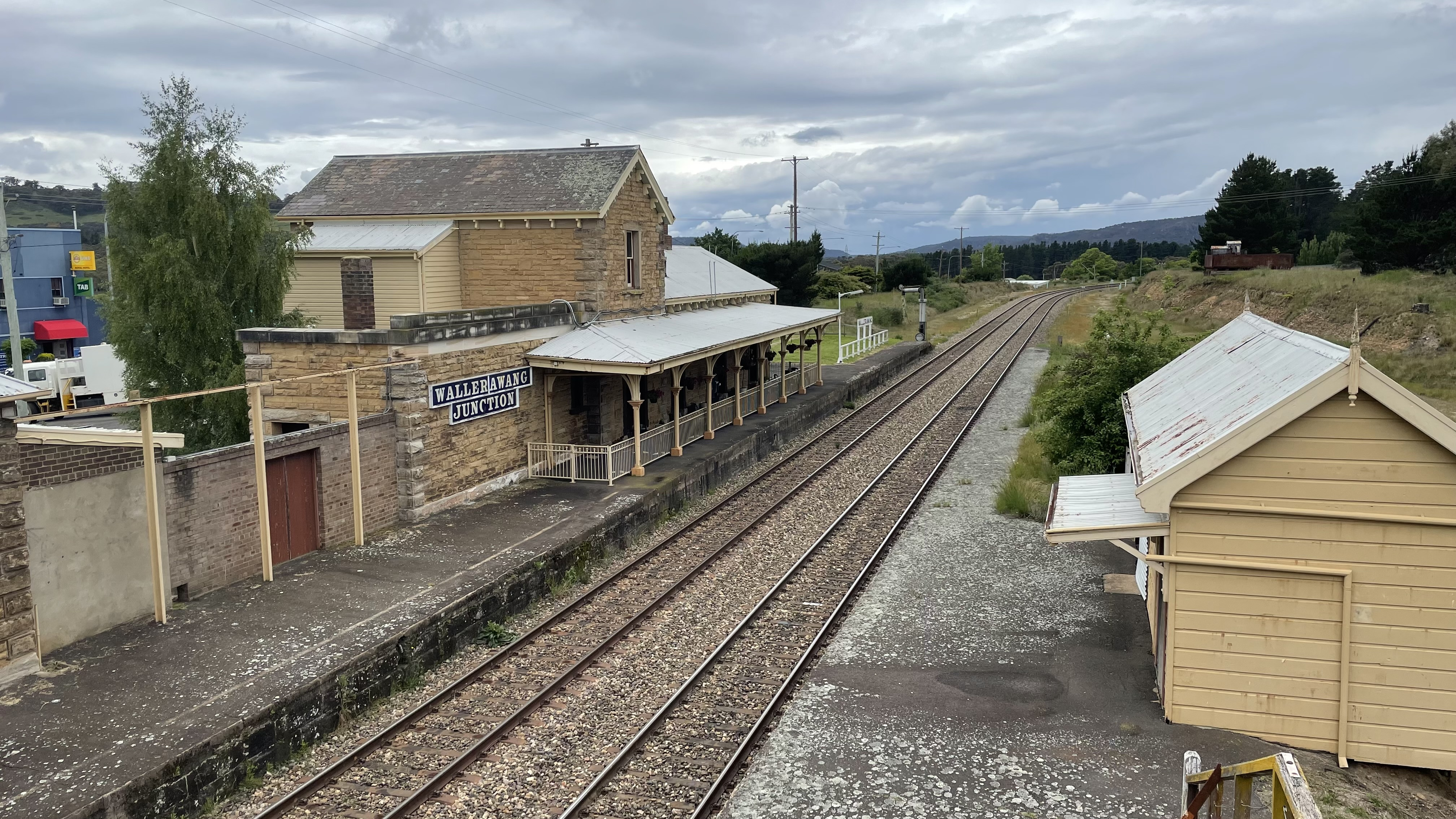
Wallerawang railway station

The Main Western railway line passes through the town of Wallerawang. In 1870 the track was opened to Wallerawang on its way to the next temporary terminus at Rydal later in 1870 and then Tarana in 1872. From May 1882, Wallerawang became a junction station with a junction 600 metres (2,000 ft) west of the station being the start of the railway line to Mudgee, later extended as the Gwabegar line. The railway station closed to passenger services in May 1989 after operating since 1870, with services replaced by road coaches.

In 2022, it was announced that Wallerawang railway station would be reopened for passenger services. As of February 2026, the heritage restoration of the station is currently underway with the reopening of the station expected in late 2026. The restoration includes the old platform being replaced; restoration of the original sandstone buildings and awning; and modern upgrades such as new lighting and safety features (including CCTV), electrical and NBN connections, and Opal card ticketing facilities.

== Wallerawang Power Station ==
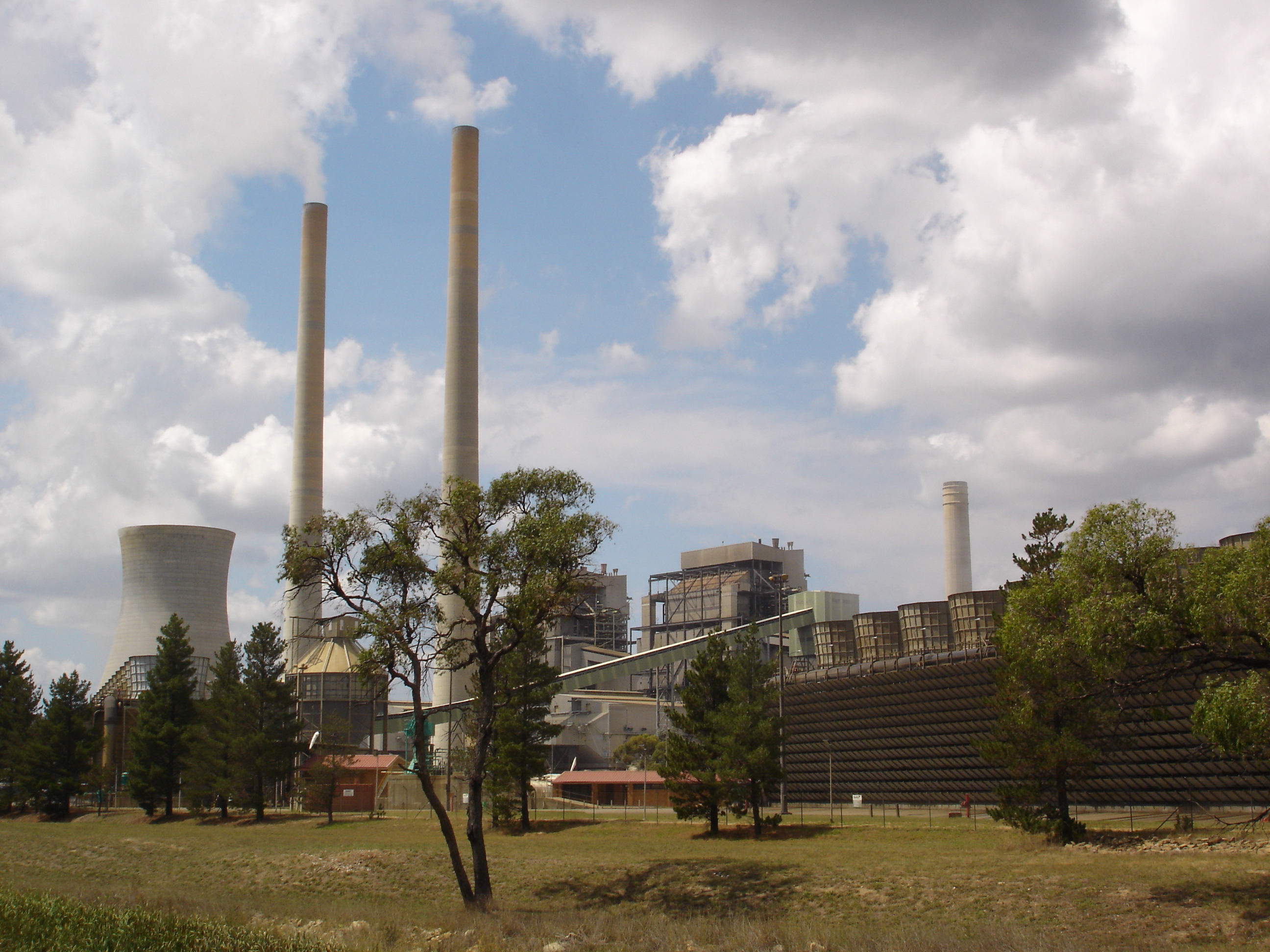
Wallerawang Power Station built 1957

A proposal for a new power station specifically designed to use the lower grade coal of the area was approved in 1950. Built beside the Coxs River, the site was determined in April 1950 with construction commencing properly in November 1951. It was declared open in 1957.

- The Wallerawang Power Station was a coal fired station located on the eastern side of the township.
- In 1951 the Electricity Commission of New South Wales commenced construction of the power station, power being generated in 1957.
- In 1978 Lake Wallace was constructed to provide additional water cooling capacity for the power station.
- With various upgrades the station generated power for the Australian national power grid.
- It was placed out of service in 2014. and was marked for demolition.
- In Nov 2021, the power station was demolished.

== "Wallerawang 9" Battery Project ==
In 2020, it was announced that EnergyAustralia had sold the disused coal station site to new owners - developer Greenspot - with the company announcing plans to transform the 620ha site into a sustainable, multi-use industrial precinct centered around a large, grid-scale Battery Energy Storage System (BESS). The battery project - which is to be built, owned and operated by Shell Australia - has an approved capacity of 500MW/1,000MWh and will connect into the existing adjacent 330kV and 132kV Transgrid Wallerawang substations.

In addition to the battery project, the development proposal includes industrial, argibusiness and manufacturing within the precinct, as well as a green corridor, recreational and retail space surrounding Lake Wallace.

The project is located to the southeast of the planned Central West Orana Renewable Energy Zone (REZ) and connects to the transmission line linking the REZ to Sydney.

== Military history ==
During World War II, Wallerawang was the location of RAAF No.4 Inland Aircraft Fuel Depot (IAFD), completed in 1942 and closed in 1944. Usually consisting of 4 tanks, 31 fuel depots were built across Australia for the storage and supply of aircraft fuel for the RAAF and the US Army Air Forces at a total cost of £900,000 ($1,800,000).
