= Cooerwull Academy =

Coordinates: 33.49639°S 150.13418°E

Information
- School type: Private boarding school
- Religious affiliation(s): Presbyterianism
- Established: 1882
- Founder: Andrew Brown
- Closed: c. 1914-1918
- Gender: Boys
- Capacity: 80
- Affiliation: AAGPS; St Andrew's College

Cooerwull Academy was an independent, Presbyterian, day and boarding school for boys, located in Bowenfels, a small town on the western outskirts of Lithgow, New South Wales, Australia.

Cooerwull was founded in 1882 by the Scottish pastoralist and industrialist, Andrew Brown, who was also the Lithgow Valley's first European settler. The school, which was originally intended to be a training academy for prospective Presbyterian ministers, was the first Presbyterian school established in New South Wales. The school could accommodate up to 80 pupils at a time.

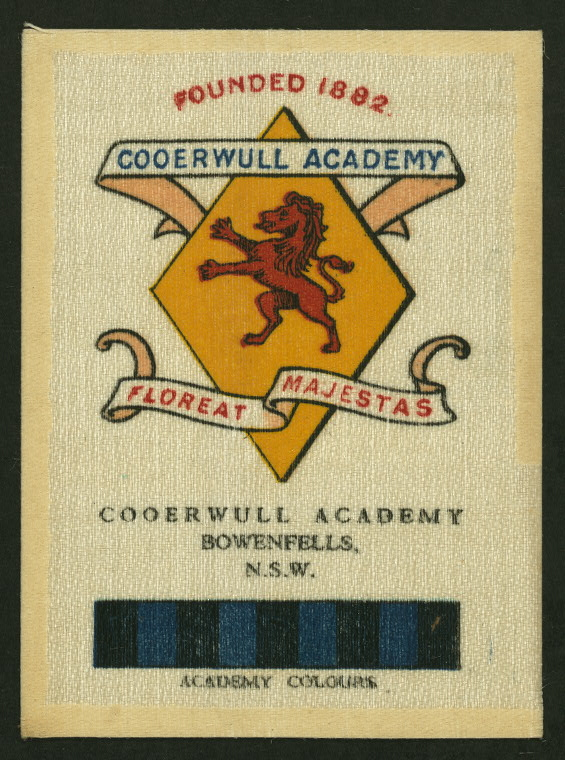
Collectable Australian school cigarette card featuring the Cooerwull colours & crest, c. 1920s.

Cooerwull attended the initial meetings resulting in the formation of the Athletic Association of the Great Public Schools of New South Wales but did not take part in any of the association's events. It was attached to St Andrew's College at the University of Sydney, which was also founded by Andrew Brown.

The Academy ceased operating when most of its staff and some students enlisted to fight in the First World War. It then became a private residence, and in 1953 the site was converted into the Catholic, La Salle Academy, which is still in operation today.

== Notable alumni ==
- Thomas Simpson Crawford QC (1875–1976), Presbyterian minister, Member of the NSW Legislative Assembly for the seat of Marrickville and Crown Prosecutor
- William Montgomerie Fleming (1874–1961), Member of the NSW Legislative Assembly for the seat of Robertson and seat of Upper Hunter, Member of the House of Representatives as the member for the Division of Robertson and writer
- John Ross OBE (1891–1973), Member of the NSW Legislative Assembly for the seat of Albury and Member of the Nationalist Party of Australia
- Cecil Arthur Butler OBE (1902–1980), aviator and founder of Butler Air Transport
- Arthur Sidney (Sid) Hoskins (1892–1959), industrialist, third son of Charles Hoskins and younger brother of Cecil Hoskins.

== Notable teachers ==
- Carsten Borchgrevink (1864–1934), who would later become an Anglo-Norwegian polar explorer and a pioneer of Antarctic travel

== See also ==
- List of non-government schools in New South Wales
- List of boarding schools
