= Bowenfels =

- Town
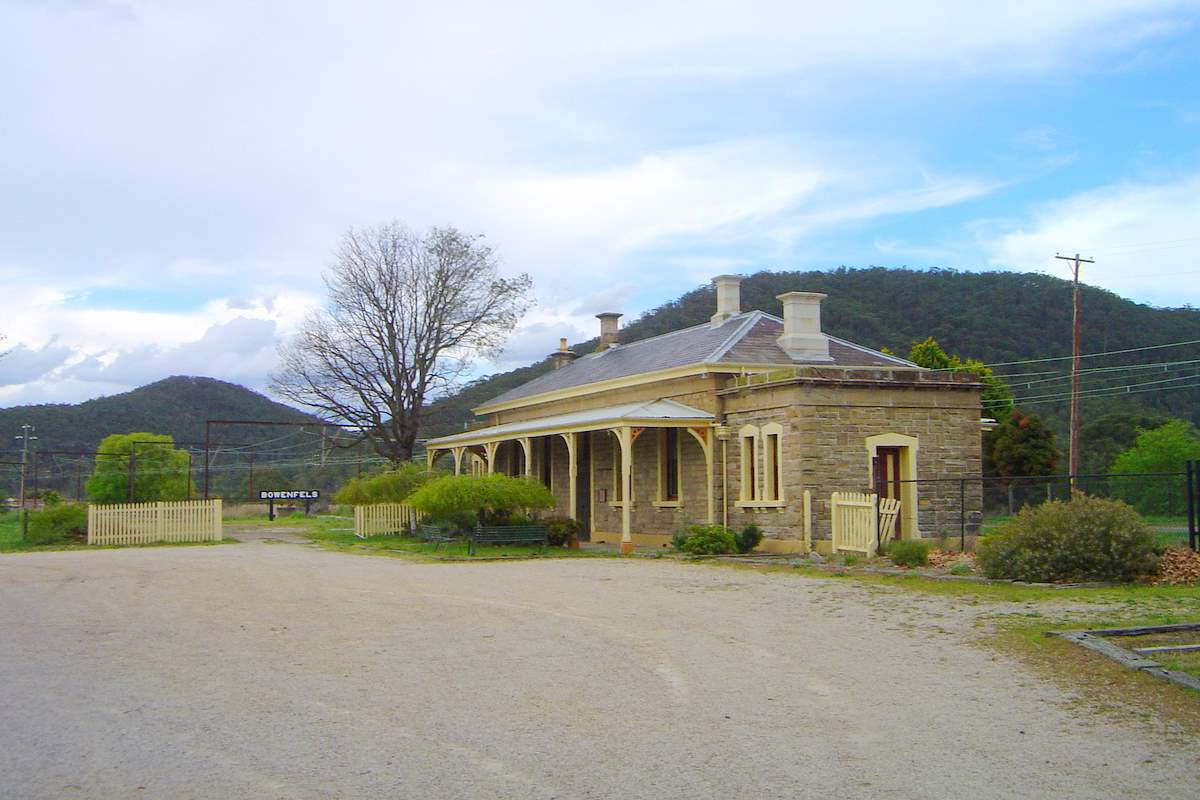
- Bowenfels railway station

- Coordinates: 33°31′S 150°07′E
- Country: Australia
- State: New South Wales
- LGA: City of Lithgow
- Location: 145 km (90 mi) WNW of Sydney; 2 km (1.2 mi) W of Lithgow; 59 km (37 mi) E of Bathurst; 37 km (23 mi) NW of Katoomba

Government
  - State electorate: Bathurst
  - Federal division: Calare
- Elevation: 910 m (2,990 ft)

Population
  - Total: 2,048 (2006 census)
- Postcode: 2790
Localities around Bowenfels
Marrangaroo	Marrangaroo	Lithgow
	Bowenfels	Lithgow
South Bowenfels	South Bowenfels	Lithgow

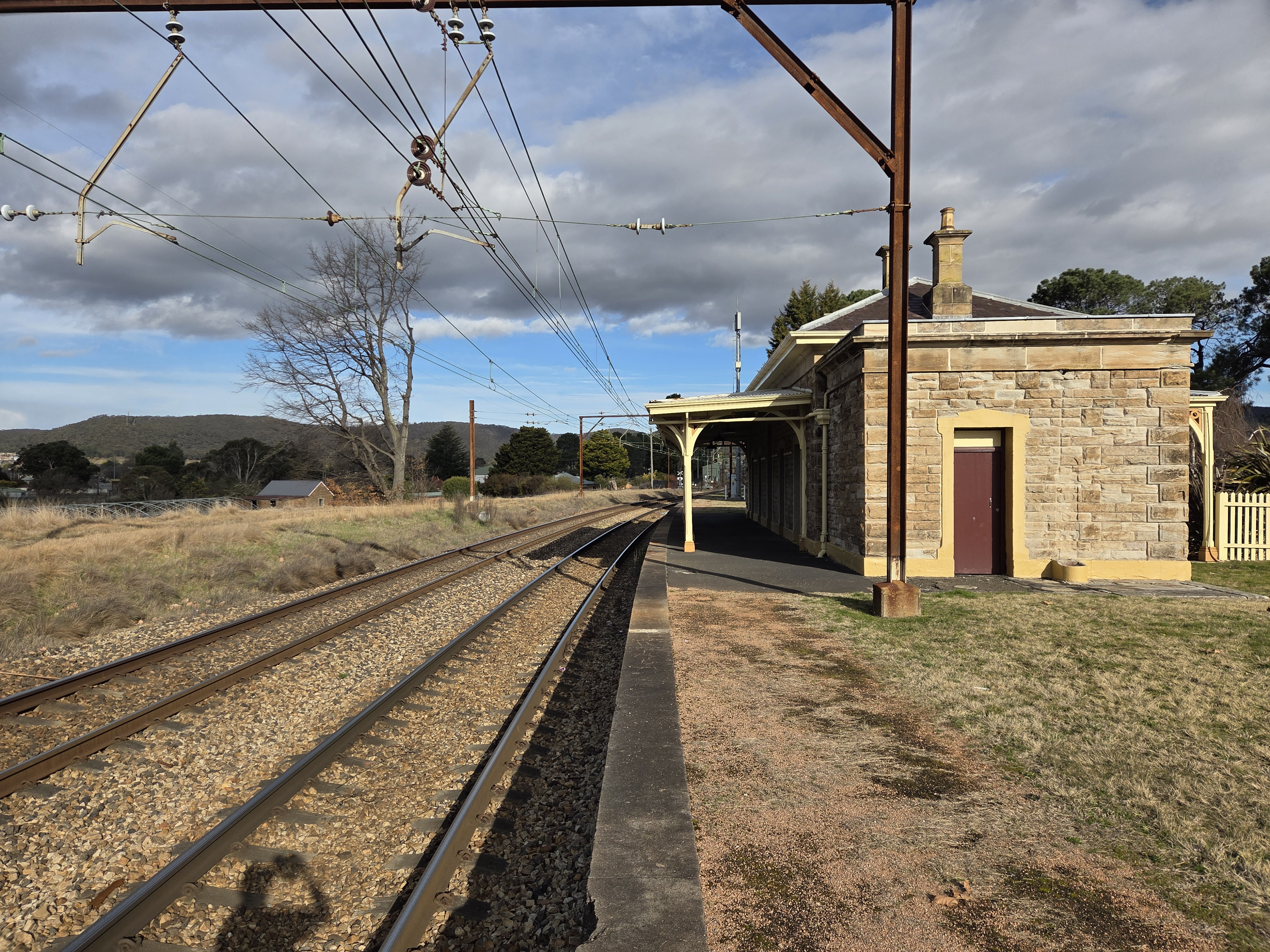
Bowenfels (former) Main station Platform

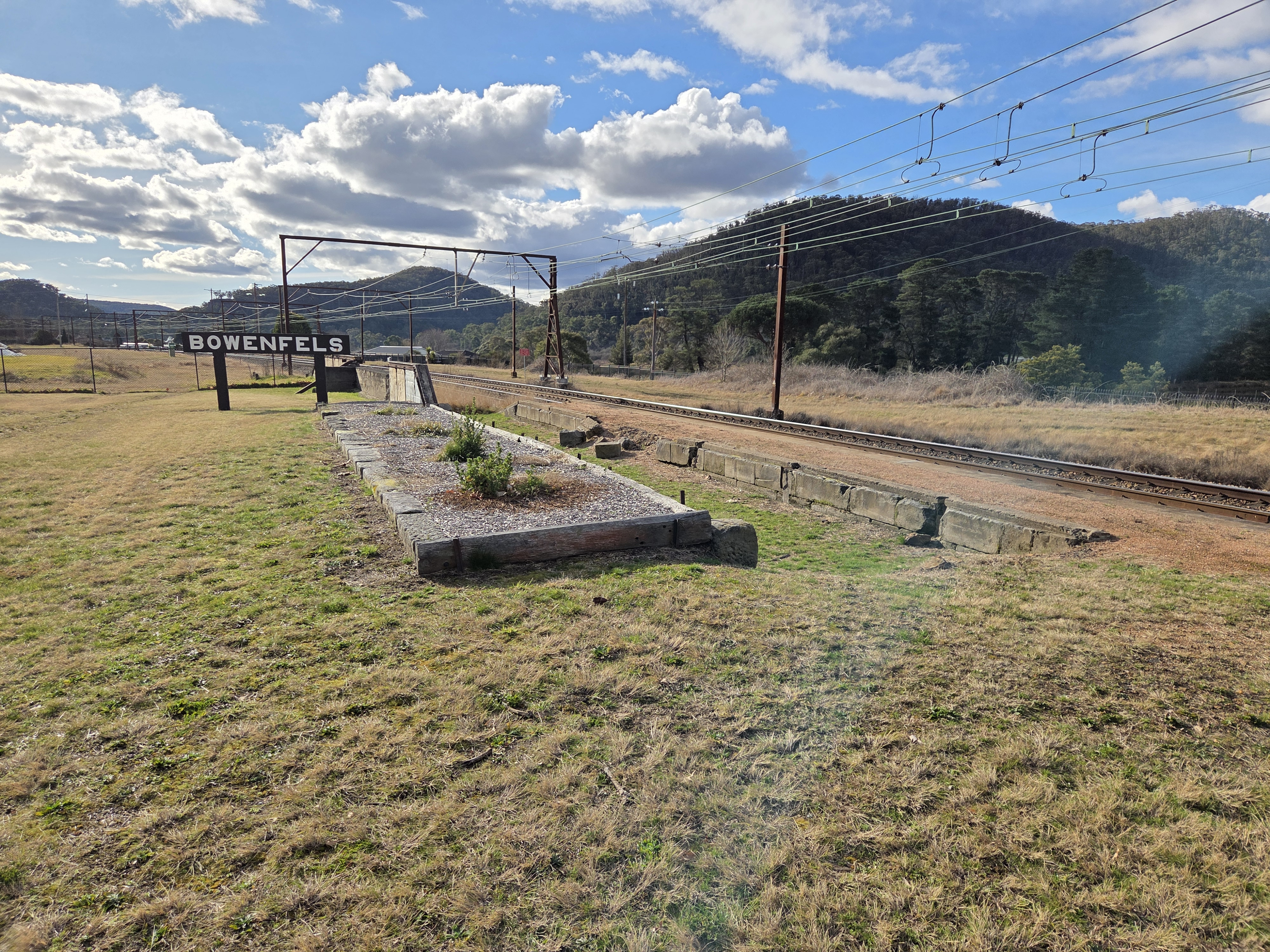
Bowenfels (former) Siding station Platform

Bowenfels is a small town on the western outskirts of Lithgow, New South Wales, Australia.

Today there are effectively two Bowenfels. Near Lithgow, on the Great Western Highway, is Bowenfels (with the homestead of the valley's first settler, Andrew Brown). About a kilometre south is South Bowenfels. Although both are now essentially suburbs of Lithgow, Bowenfels was, in fact, the first settlement in the valley, pre-dating the existence of Lithgow by nearly 40 years.

== History ==
Mount Blaxland, a short distance from South Bowenfels, was the furthest point reached by Blaxland, Lawson, and Wentworth on their historic expedition across the Blue Mountains in 1813. Later in that year George Evans followed in the footsteps of the explorers to Mount Blaxland and then headed west to discover the O'Connell plains and the Bathurst plains. At South Bowenfels, Magpie Hollow Road heads west to Lake Lyell and then on to Tarana and O'Connell.

Bowenfels was founded in the 1830s to service travellers along the new road to Bathurst, which opened in 1832, following the opening of the Victoria Pass, which sealed the fate of the old Bathurst road in its descent of Mt. York. It was named by Surveyor-General Thomas Mitchell after George Mears Bowen, a former member of his department. The town was the first settlement in the valley and pre-dated Lithgow by 40 years. The railway opened in 1869, and was electrified in the 1950s, although passenger services no longer service Bowenfels station.

== Heritage listings ==
Bowenfels has a number of heritage-listed sites, including:

- Great Western Highway: Fernhill, Bowenfels
- via Kirkley Street: Lithgow Heavy Anti Aircraft Gun Stations and Dummy Station
- Main Western railway: Bowenfels railway station
- Main Western railway: Bowenfels rail viaducts

== Population ==
According to the 2016 census of population, there were 2,048 people in Bowenfels.

- Aboriginal and Torres Strait Islander people made up 9.5% of the population.
- 78.9% of people were born in Australia and 84.8% of people spoke only English at home.
- The most common responses for religion were Catholic 25.5%, No Religion 24.2% and Anglican 21.8%.
