= Cox's Road and Early Deviations - Linden, Linden Precinct =

Historic road in New South Wales, Australia

Cox's Road and Early Deviations – Linden, Linden Precinct
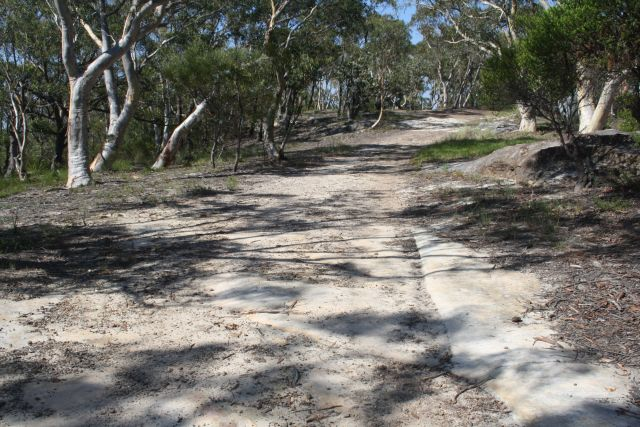

- Location within New South Wales Location within Australia
- 33°43′08″S 150°29′37″E
- Location: off Railway Parade, Linden, City of Blue Mountains, New South Wales, Australia

History
- Built: 1814–

Site notes
- Architect: William Cox

New South Wales Heritage Register
- Official name: Cox's Road and Early Deviations – Linden, Linden Precinct; Old Bathurst Road; Coxs Road
- Type: State heritage (complex / group)
- Designated: 31 July 2015
- Reference no.: 1953
- Type: Road
- Category: Transport – Land
- Builders: William Cox; Convict Road Party

Cox's Road and Early Deviations – Linden, Linden Precinct is a heritage-listed former road and now fire trail and road at off Railway Parade, Linden, City of Blue Mountains, New South Wales, Australia. It was designed and built by William Cox from 1814, with the assistance of a convict road party.. It is also known as Old Bathurst Road and Coxs Road. It was added to the New South Wales State Heritage Register on 31 July 2015.

== History ==
The road from Emu Ford to Bathurst, a distance of 163.3 kilometres (101.5 mi) was completed in only six months during 1814 and 1815 by a working party composed mostly of convicts. Governor Lachlan Macquarie decided to have a carriage road constructed across the Blue Mountains, to the country which had been "newly discovered" by Europeans in 1813.

The so called "First Crossing" of 1813 took place on the traditional lands of the Dharug, Gundungurra and Wiradjuri people. Other routes through the ridges and valleys of the Blue Mountains had been used by Aboriginal people for tens of thousands of years.

Cox was born in Wimborne Minster, Dorset in 1764. He married Rebecca Upjohn at Clerkenwell, London in 1789. Cox arrived in NSW on board the "Minerva" in January 1800. Cox became Chief Magistrate at Windsor in 1810 and in July 1814 Governor Macquarie made William Cox the Superintendent of the works for a new road over the Blue Mountains. His first wife died in 1819 and Cox married Anna Blachford in 1821. He died on 15 March 1837.

Cox's road party reached the Linden area by late August 1814, and remained at Linden - Woodford until around mid-September 1814, by which time they had moved on to the present day vicinity of Hazelbrook. It was the first time they encountered the steep rocky platforms, and the ever-narrowing ridge. Cox's style of road-building was pragmatic and primitive. Confronted with rocky platforms and sharp drops, he generally had his men clear the flattest parts, removing an "immense quantity of rock" where necessary, and usually marking out the line with shallow chiselled gutters and utilising the rock platform as a pavement; where the road ran over the shallow soils, it was often marked out by rows or low walls of rough, broken stone.

The road was cut past 'Caley's' cairn of stones, built, it was thought, to mark the end of an earlier unsuccessful attempt to cross the mountains, but possibly a structure of Aboriginal origin.

The actual construction and completion of the road is recorded in Cox's Journal. The journal indicates that three areas in particular required extensive cutting through rocky outcrops, an activity especially likely to have left an "archaeological imprint" in the form of surviving physical evidence. These areas were Linden to Woodford, Wentworth Falls and the descent at Mount York. Entries in the journal indicate that the road party reached the Linden area at the end of August and constructed the road through the localities of Linden and Woodford during the first half of September, 1814.

Cox wrote describing the Linden - Woodford area as follows:

Sunday, 4 September 1814: Removed to the bridge the working road gang. Removed forward to Caley's pile. No water for stock near the bridge, nor a blade of grass. The water we get is near a mile distant, and that in a tremendous gully to the right. Went forward to Caley's pile, and from thence up the rock to Evans' cave. You get a view of the country from north-west round to south and SSW as far as the eye can carry you from hence. The land to the west is still higher. The country to the northward appears extremely hilly with nothing but rocks and timber. To the east there appears much level country. Windsor and various parts of cleared land is seen from hence'.

— Cox's journal, 1814

The actual building of the road involved the definition of a trafficable route which was then cleared of vegetation (trees being cut-off below ground level but rarely "grubbed out"), boulders and rocky outcrops. The formation of the road itself was as minimal as the terrain allowed, with low side-cuttings and embankments as necessary. In very rocky terrain cuttings were made into the mountain itself, the natural rock providing the road surface or pavement. It is possible that some of the stepped rock platforms may have initially been partly filled or levelled with earthen ramps, although Karskens (1988) suggests that Cox mostly left the road pavement in an unformed, natural state due to the haste with which the road was being constructed.

Even if it was initially partly filled or shaped, much of the original surface of the road weathered away quickly, as by 1819 it was reported that the stumps of the trees which had been left within the roadway were becoming exposed.

Well preserved sections and other scattered remnants of Cox's Road survive in the Linden and Woodford areas. These include isolated remnants such as single gutters and wedge-pits in the vicinity of the Linden Railway Station and near the Linden Reservoir (above Numantia Road). Neither of these sections is within this SHR Listing. There is also a well preserved section of Cox's Road which commences immediately west of the Hepburn Road and Great Western Highway intersection and continues west along Old Bathurst Road at Woodford.

Although the original line of Cox's Road crossed Tollgate Drive, the railway line and the Great Western Highway beyond the western end of the unsurfaced track at Railway Parade, Linden, construction activity has been intensive and no remnants of the road exist in this location.

From the 1820s onwards, the earlier lines of road were upgraded and although short sections of Cox's Road were later adopted as parts of the local road network (eg. part of Burke Road, Linden and Old Bathurst Road, Woodford) most of the original Cox's Road appears to have gradually gone out of use in the Linden area during the 1830s

== Description ==
William Cox had been instructed by Governor Macquarie only to open a rough cart road, so that the new lands found in the western plains would be symbolically open. The road from Emu Ford to Bathurst, a distance of 163 kilometres (101 mi) was completed in only six months. Macquarie's instructions specified that the road should be at least 3.7 metres (12 ft) wide in order that two carts would be able to pass each other, and that the timber should be cleared on each side so that the road corridor was 6.1 metres (20 ft) wide. Stumps were to be grubbed out and any holes should be filled in. This was the method adopted in relatively easy terrain, although later travellers reported that the stumps had not always been removed and the surviving physical evidence shows relatively few locations where the extant road conforms with the dimensions specified in the instructions.

The Tollgate Drive section of Cox's Road is the first of the more intact surviving sections of the 1814 road which are encountered within the Blue Mountains LGA. The 1814 road occupies the crest of the ridge. It extends for over 800 metres (2,600 ft) beside and overlapping with an unsurfaced access road along the top of the ridge and also partly within adjoining private properties. The modern roughly formed vehicular access track with some subsidiary diversions, leads off Tollgate Drive/Railway Parade. The modern unsurfaced tracks themselves cross, and in some places partly overlie, the earlier Cox's Road formation.

The western end of the access track commences at Railway Parade where it climbs a short steep rise surfaced with loose stones. Where there are rocky outcrops beside the road it features several sections of low hand-cut gutters and kerb-lines (33.7197°S 150.4932°E). The cuttings are between 10 and 60 centimetres (3.9 and 23.6 in) in height and where they mark both sides of the road they are 6 to 7 metres (20 to 23 ft) apart, roughly conforming with Governor Macquarie's requested width of "20 feet (6.1 m)". Most of the cuttings have vertical faces and feature sharp pointed marks indicating the use of chisels or pick-axes during construction. Other marks suggest the use of a long round iron spike which makes marks 2 centimetres (0.79 in) in diameter and 15 centimetres (5.9 in) long. A small section of rock-cut drain measuring 20 centimetres (7.9 in) wide and 1.5 metres (4 ft 11 in) long is also evident. In several places the low kerb cuttings adjoin sections of rock platform. These have generally been cut and smoothed at the edge of the road but in the centre remain very uneven, with natural cracks and crevices and evidence of deeply scored ruts made by the wheels of carts or other vehicles.

From the ridge there are extensive views on both sides of the road which conform with those described by early travellers, giving a sense of the experience of the early 19th century road even though the surrounding area has been recently subdivided and developed for residential house blocks.

The State Heritage Register listing of Cox's Road and Early Deviations includes six precincts of Cox's Road:

- Cox's Road and Early Deviations – Linden, Linden Precinct – HC Plan 2639
- Cox's Road and Early Deviations – Woodford, Old Bathurst Road Precinct – HC Plan 2640
- Cox's Road and Early Deviations – Woodford, Appian Way Precinct – HC Plan 2641
- Cox's Road and Early Deviations – Mount York, Cox's Pass Precinct – HC Plan 2642
- Cox's Road and Early Deviations – Hartley, Clarence Hilly Range / Mount Blaxland Precinct – HC Plan 2643
- Cox's Road and Early Deviations – Sodwalls, Fish River Descent Precinct – HC Plan 2644

=== Condition ===
As at 30 October 2014 the condition of the road was good and substantially intact. Numerous archaeological features from the 1814 road are evident including road fabric, gutters, cuttings. The road has high archaeological integrity.

== Heritage listing ==
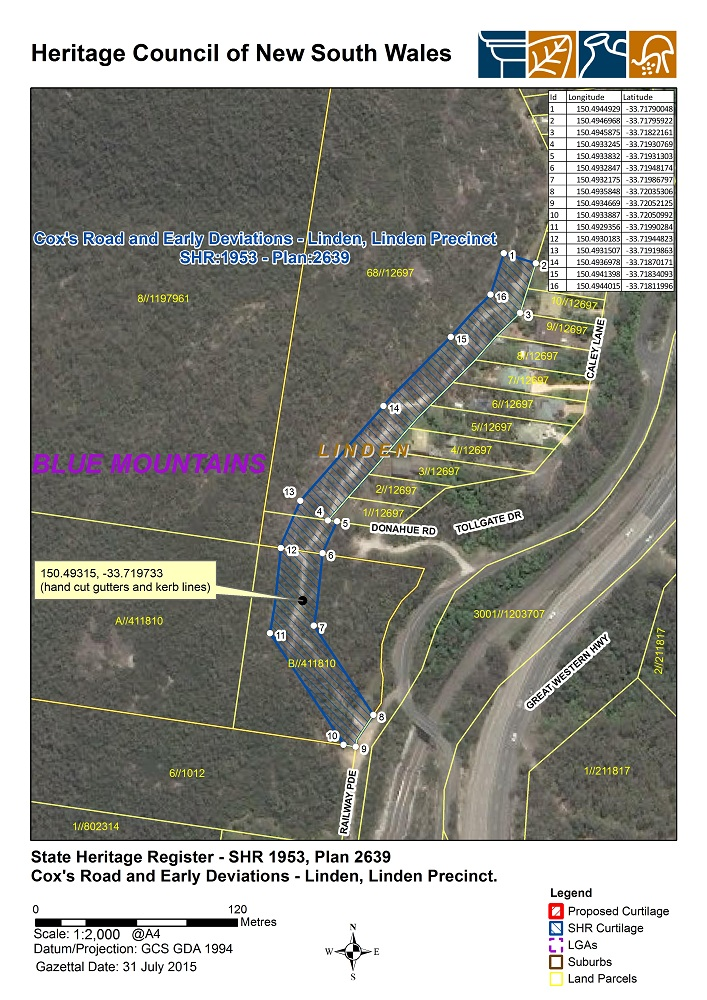
Heritage boundaries showing the route of the road

As at 27 January 2015, The surviving remnants of Cox's Road, built 1814 to 1815, have state significance as the earliest road across the Blue Mountains and the first structure built by Europeans west of the Blue Mountains. Building of this road followed from the prior exploration by Gregory Blaxland, William Lawson and William Wentworth, and the survey by George Evans. The successful construction of the road was symbolic of the conquest of the natural barrier created by the Blue Mountains, and represented Governor Macquarie's vision for the ongoing development of the colony beyond Sydney and its immediate surrounds. Cox's Road enabled the later opening of the hinterland beyond the Blue Mountains for subsequent settlement, pastoral and agricultural expansion, which then escalated the dispossession of Aboriginal peoples from their lands.

William Cox was well known among convicts for his power to recommend pardons and tickets of leave. Most of the convicts who volunteered for the work to open a track to the interior were emancipated, receiving Pardons or Tickets of Leave on completion of the work.

The surviving road fabric demonstrates the crude and hurried nature of Cox's work, and the techniques used in tracing, cutting and forming the road. In conjunction with later colonial road alignments on the mountains and elsewhere, Cox's Road also forms part of a suite of roads demonstrating the wide range of road building styles and standards employed during the colonial period.

Cox's Road and Early Deviations – Linden, Linden Precinct was listed on the New South Wales State Heritage Register on 31 July 2015 having satisfied the following criteria.

The place is important in demonstrating the course, or pattern, of cultural or natural history in New South Wales.

Surviving remnants of Cox's Road have state historical significance as physical evidence of the first road constructed across the Blue Mountains from Emu Plains to the Bathurst Plains (1814–15). Constructed in 1814–15 Cox's Road is one of the earliest Colonial-era road-lines surviving in Australia. The 1814 road is tangible evidence of the development of the colony at Sydney and of the expansion of white settlement into western NSW. The road symbolises the occupation of the country and Governor Macquarie's aspirations for the eventual opening of the interior to European settlement after the discovery of the Western plains by G. W. Evans in 1814. In this respect the 1814–1815 Cox's Road has considerable symbolic significance as an official public work which laid the foundations for future development. Cox's Road is linked with the foundation of Bathurst, the first inland settlement in NSW, which was proclaimed by Governor Macquarie on 7 May 1815 after his journey along the road.

The place has a strong or special association with a person, or group of persons, of importance of cultural or natural history of New South Wales's history.

The surviving remnants of Cox's Road have state significance for their close association with Governor Lachlan Macquarie who commissioned the building of the road into the interior, and with the magistrate and ex-army officer Captain William Cox, who supervised the building of the road. The road is also associated with the convicts who laboured on the road to obtain their liberty, and with the officers and men who assisted Cox such as Thomas Hobby, Richard Lewis, John Tighe and Samuel Ayres. The crossing of the Blue Mountains, the surveying of a route to Bathurst and the building of Cox's Road were significant events in the period of Macquarie's governorship. Governor Macquarie's view of the importance of the road is demonstrated by his reports to Earl Bathurst, the British Secretary of State for War and the Colonies, and by his journey to the Bathurst Plains immediately after its construction, where he proclaimed the site for the Bathurst township.

William Cox's achievement using a small group of convict men in a short period of time and with no loss of life caused by road-making or other substantial difficulties, was reflective of his reputation as a more humane employer and magistrate than many of his contemporaries. The leadership qualities, vision and skill he showed constructing the road would also be evident in later government contracts won by Cox for other public works .

The place is important in demonstrating aesthetic characteristics and/or a high degree of creative or technical achievement in New South Wales.

The surviving precincts of Cox's Road have state technical significance for their ability to demonstrate simple, pre 1820s road building techniques. Improvement of the 1814 route throughout the 1820s also provide important evidence of later road building techniques and demonstrates the ongoing use of this key route to the interior, before it was superseded by the new Great Western Road laid out by Sir Thomas Mitchell in the 1830s.

The Linden – Tollgate Drive/Railway Parade Precinct of Cox's Road is one of the more intact surviving sections of the 1814 road. It extends for over 800 metres (2,600 ft) beside and overlapping with an unsurfaced access road along the top of the ridge. From the ridge there are extensive views on both sides of the road which conform with those described by early travellers, giving a sense of the experience of the early nineteenth-century road even though the surrounding area has been recently subdivided and developed for residential house blocks.

The place has a strong or special association with a particular community or cultural group in New South Wales for social, cultural or spiritual reasons.

Cox's Road and its remnants are demonstrated as having social significance at a state level by the substantial interest in identifying and promoting Cox's Road for cultural tourism and education, and celebrating the bicentenary of the road by the general public, state and local government bodies and a range of community organisations. The road is of particular importance to Cox descendants. The William Cox Fellowship first nominated sections of Cox's Road for heritage listing in the 1980s.

The place has potential to yield information that will contribute to an understanding of the cultural or natural history of New South Wales.

Precincts of Cox's Road have research significance at a state level for their ability to demonstrate early nineteenth century road, culvert and bridge building techniques using basic skills and technologies. The remains of the 1814–15 road illustrate the conditions of the period and contribute to an understanding of the process of exploration and development, and of early colonial road building and road use. The remains represent a major physical, technological and engineering achievement and exhibit fine details of workmanship. Several precincts of the 1814–15 road have specific archaeological potential.

The place possesses uncommon, rare or endangered aspects of the cultural or natural history of New South Wales.

Surviving precincts of the 1814–1815 Cox's Road from Penrith to Bathurst are rare examples of early Colonial road building in NSW. The surviving remnants of Cox's Road have state significance as a rare example of pre 1820 road building based on the use of manual and primitive tools, and predating the more sophisticated road survey and construction techniques employed on the later "Great Roads" of the 1820s and 1830s.

== See also ==
- Cox's Road and Early Deviations – Hartley, Clarence Hilly Range and Mount Blaxland Precinct
- Cox's Road and Early Deviations – Mount York, Cox's Pass Precinct
- Cox's Road and Early Deviations – Sodwalls, Fish River Descent Precinct
- Cox's Road and Early Deviations – Woodford, Appian Way Precinct
- Cox's Road and Early Deviations – Woodford, Old Bathurst Road Precinct
- Convicts in Australia
