= Cox's Road and Early Deviations - Mount York, Cox's Pass Precinct =

Historic road in New South Wales, Australia

Cox's Road and Early Deviations – Mount York, Cox's Pass Precinct
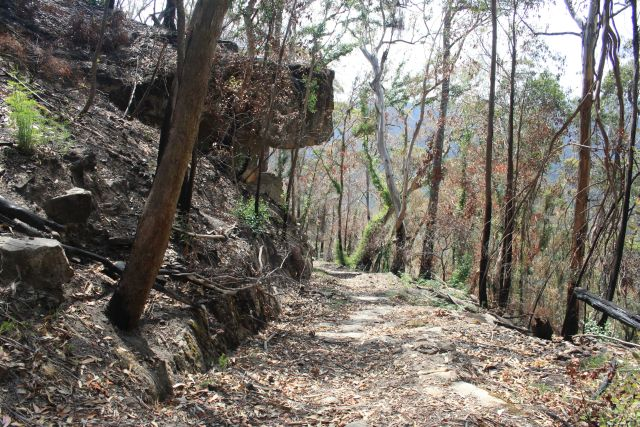

- Location within New South Wales Location within Australia
- 33°43′08″S 150°29′37″E
- Location: Mount York Road (off), Mount Victoria, City of Blue Mountains, New South Wales, Australia

History
- Built: 1814–

Site notes
- Architect: William Cox

New South Wales Heritage Register
- Official name: Cox's Road and Early Deviations – Mount York, Cox's Pass Precinct; Old Bathurst Road; Bathurst Road; Historic Crossings Walking Track; Coxs Road
- Type: State heritage (complex / group)
- Designated: 25 March 2015
- Reference no.: 1956
- Type: Road
- Category: Transport – Land
- Builders: William Cox; Convict Road Party

Cox's Road and Early Deviations – Mount York, Cox's Pass Precinct is a heritage-listed former colonial road and now walking track at Mount York Road (off), Mount Victoria, City of Blue Mountains, New South Wales, Australia. It was designed and built by William Cox from 1814, with the assistance of the convict road party. It is also known as Old Bathurst Road; Bathurst Road; Historic Crossings Walking Track and Coxs Road. It was added to the New South Wales State Heritage Register on 25 March 2015.

== History ==
The road from Emu Ford to Bathurst, a distance of 163 kilometres (101 mi) was completed in only six months during 1814 and 1815 by a working party composed mostly of convicts. Governor Lachlan Macquarie decided to have a carriage road constructed across the Blue Mountains, to the country which had been "newly discovered" by Europeans in 1813.

The so called "First Crossing" of 1813 took place on the traditional lands of the Dharug, Gundungurra and Wiradjuri people. Other routes through the ridges and valleys of the Blue Mountains had been used by Aboriginal people for tens of thousands of years.

Cox was born in Wimborne Minster, Dorset in 1764. He married Rebecca Upjohn at Clerkenwell, London in 1789. Cox arrived in NSW on board the "Minerva" in January 1800. Cox became Chief Magistrate at Windsor in 1810 and in July 1814 Governor Macquarie made William Cox the Superintendent of the works for a new road over the Blue Mountains. His first wife died in 1819 and Cox married Anna Blachford in 1821. He died on 15 March 1837.

Mount York is found at the end of a spur which projects westward from the main Blue Mountains ridge, on the edge of the western escarpment. It has a spectacular view westwards over the Hartley Valley, Kanimbla Valley and the Vale of Clywdd. The view from Mount York became a symbolic focus as a vista of the western lands revealed after the struggle and triumph of the First Crossing.

The construction of a descent from the bluff at Mount York took William Cox and his road party five weeks between 7 November and 14 December 1814. The actual building of the road involved the definition of a trafficable route which was then cleared of vegetation (trees being cut-off below ground level but rarely "grubbed out"), boulders and rocky outcrops. The formation of the road itself was as minimal as the terrain allowed, with low side-cuttings and embankments as necessary. The actual construction and completion of the road is recorded in Cox's Journal. Cox's journal indicates that three areas in particular required extensive cutting through rocky outcrops; at Linden to Woodford, Wentworth Falls and the descent at Mount York.

In early November 1814 Cox sent several different parties to examine the mountain "at the end of the ridge" and the adjacent ridges and gullies to seek the best line for the building of a road descent to the valley below. He described the route as "going down steep between immense large boulders" and "bounded both by steep gullies and rocks" and noted "it is with much difficulty a person can get down at all". He doubted it was possible to "make a good road to go down and up again" without great cost in labour, time and materials and therefore settled on making a basic road suitable for a light and unloaded cart, or for the driving of stock down the "Herculean mountain".

The present Mount York Road adopts a similar line to Cox's Road along the top of the ridge with minor deviations from the original route. Two signposted "Historic Wells" along this route about 500 metres south of Barden's Lookout, are unlikely to be original works associated with the 1814 road. Cox's Journal makes no reference to well-digging even though the road party was in this area for several weeks, but he does refer to water being transported in kegs "from the rocks below".

Cox referred in his Journal to "hard ground" full of "very large rocks" and he commented frequently on the amount of time, labour and gunpowder needed to complete the pass down the mountain with large rocks cut and "turned out" of the road line or blasted away. Examples of the Journal entries are as follows:

Monday, 7 November: Mr. Hobby joined me this morning. At 6 a.m. went forward with 10 men to commence operations for a road down the mountains. Light rain and heavy fog.

Tuesday, 8 November: Employed the same hands in the same manner. Light rain as before. The men very wet and uncomfortable, their clothes and bedding being also wet.

Wednesday, 9 November: Removed forward to the extreme end of the mountains as did also the whole of the party. The rocks here are so lofty and undermined that the men will be able to sleep dry and keep their little clothing dry also, which is what they have not been able to do this last fortnight. Left 12 men to finish up the road; all the rest employed with myself. Cold rain set in about noon. Wind S. West.

Thursday, 10 November: Rainy morning. Cleared up at 9 o'clock. Got a good day's work done. Evening fine and starlight.

Saturday, 12 November: A very fine day. Wind east and cold. Completed the road to the beginning of the large mountain where we have to descend to the forest ground. Measured it up; it is 48 miles 50 chains. Continued to clear away the timber and rubbish through the large rocks, and to the beginning of the bluff end of the mountains. Two men on the sick list.

Monday, 14 November: Sick list: James Dwyer, cold, pains in limbs; Samuel Freeman, cold, swelled face; Samuel Crook, cold, bad eyes; Patrick Hanrigan, cold, pains in limbs; Samuel Walters, hurt by a bullock. The extreme wet weather we had for a fortnight before we arrived here has given most of the men colds, but as they are now dry lodged, and in addition to their own ration have fresh kangaroo at least three times a week, it is to be hoped they will soon recover. So many men sick, and chiefly very useful ones, breaks in on our working party much, and the continuous rain also prevents so much work being done as I could wish. Fine morning, at noon thunder with rain and hail. Wind east, very cold. Steady rain all the evening. Got on erecting the bridge at the beginning of the descent off the mountain, and blowing up the rocks that are in the line of our intended road down to the forest. Find it difficult work, and will cost us much labour.

Friday, 18 November: Hard at work on the rocks this day. Kept our six pickaxes at work, and William Appledore (a sailor) fixed the tackle and blocks to trees and got a most capital purchase to turn out an immense large rock at the side of the mountain in the way of our road, which he performed well. Two men received slight hurts in doing it by one of the purchases slipping (John Tindall and T. Adams). This rock would have cost me at least 5 lb. of powder to have blown it up. Two carts arrived with provisions and brought a supply of gunpowder and a keg of spirits.

Monday, 21 November: Thick, misty morning. All hands at work on the mountain. At past 10 a.m. it began to thunder and rain. About noon it increased and continued the whole day, at times very heavy. Only four hours' work done this day. Issued to all hands yesterday afternoon a gill of spirits each

Tuesday, 22 November: Thick, moist morning. The sick list reduced to one (Samuel Davis). All hands again on the mountain. Light rains and heavy fogs during the day but the men continued out and did a good day's work. Turned out a great number of very large rocks this day; blew up one. The ground as we dig discovers many more rocks that we expected.

Tuesday, 29 November: A dirty misty morning. Got a tree 55 ft. long and 9 feet in circumference by the men from the woods into his place as a side piece below the bridge and joining the rock, which is the last we want for this job. Men stuck very hard picking and grubbing the rocks and forming the road. Fine evening.

Wednesday, 30 November: A fine day, thunder at noon but no rain. Men working as yesterday and got a very good day's work done. The rock pick extremely hard. Sick list: Thomas Adams, Robert Hanley, Stephen Parker, Thomas Watkins.

Tuesday, 6 December: Beautiful clear morning. Brought a cask of pork and two bars of iron down the mountain to carry forward. Removed after breakfast with the caravan, horse cart and bullock cart to the junction of the two rivulets about six miles.

This extensive work over a five-week period in late 1814 has left substantial physical remnants of old Cox's Road visible in this area, including cuttings, gutters, retaining walls, fence sockets, and two bridge sites. These obvious remnants made this section of Cox's Road one of the best known and most celebrated in the past.

Cox's Pass and Cox's River were both specifically named by Governor Macquarie in 1815. The Government and General Order of 10 June 1815, gave lavish praise to William Cox:

'The direction and superintendence of this great work was entrusted to William Cox, Esq., the chief magistrate at Windsor; and, to the astonishment of everyone who knows what was to be encountered, and sees what has been done, he effected its completion in six months from the time of its commencement, happily without the loss of a man or any serious accident. The Governor is at a loss to appreciate fully the services rendered by Mr Cox to this colony in the execution of this arduous work, which promises to be of the greatest public utility, by opening a new source of wealth to the industrious and enterprising. When it is considered that Mr. Cox voluntarily relinquished the comforts of his own house and the society of his numerous family, and exposed himself to much personal fatigue, with only such temporary covering as a bark hut could afford from the inclemency of the weather, it is difficult to express the sentiments of approbation to which such privations and services are entitled. ......[the road] ... suddenly terminates in nearly a perpendicular precipice of 676 ft. high, as ascertained by measurement. The road constructed by Mr Cox down this rugged and tremendous descent, through all its windings, is no less than three-quarters of a mile in length, and has been executed with skill and stability, and reflects much credit on him. The labour here undergone, and the difficulties surmounted, can only be appreciated by those who view this scene. In order to perpetuate the memory of Mr Cox's services, the Governor deemed it a tribute justly due to him to give his name to this grand and extraordinary pass; and he accordingly called it Cox's Pass.'

— Governor Lachlan Macquarie, 10 June 1815.

Governor Macquarie's own Journal of his 1815 Tour along the road also noted:

'... the Grand Termination of the Blue Mountains ... and this mountain being one of the most prominent and remarkable of the whole range, I have named it Mount York in honor of H. R. Highness the Duke of York, on account of it being the only one by which it is at all practicable to descend into the low country. The pass constructed here by Mr Cox and his party I have named Cox's Pass in honor of that gentleman and as a just tribute due to his indefatigable zeal and meritorious exertions in constructing and finally completing this grand and important pass.'

— Governor Lachlan Macquarie, 29 April 1815.

With this description of Mount York and Cox's Pass, Governor Macquarie used the kind of extravagant rhetoric which subsequently found favour with others who wrote about the history of the Western Road, wanting to invest it with symbolic meaning. Cox's Road was quickly modified and then superseded by alternative road descents from the Mount York ridge, initially Lawson's Long Alley in 1823/24, and then Lockyer's Road in 1829. The entire ridge was bypassed with the transfer of convicts to work on Mitchell's Pass and the Great Western Road during the 1830s.

The spectacular views over the Hartley Valley from the famous vantage point of Mount York and the presence of historic relics of the Cox's Road (also described as the old Bathurst Road) contributed to its selection as the major site for commemoration during the 1913 Centenary Celebrations for the "First Crossing" of the Blue Mountains. The speeches and publications prepared at that time used elaborate rhetoric about explorers, visionary Governors, road-builders and pioneers. The Mount York reserve was again the setting for the major civic event held in May 2013 as part of Bicentennial Commemorations of the Crossings of the Blue Mountains.

The Pass at Mount York remains one of the most intact and most significant surviving sections of the 1814–1815 Cox's Road, and it is accessible as a walking track from the public reserve at the end of Mount York Road.

== Description ==
William Cox had been instructed by Governor Macquarie only to open a rough cart road, so that the new lands found in the western plains would be symbolically open. The road from Emu Ford to Bathurst, a distance of 163.3 kilometres (101.5 mi) was completed in only six months. Macquarie's instructions specified that the road should be at least 3.7 metres (12 ft) wide in order that two carts would be able to pass each other, and that the timber should be cleared on each side so that the road corridor was 6.1 metres (20 ft) wide. Stumps were to be grubbed out and any holes should be filled in. The surviving physical evidence shows relatively few locations where the extant road conforms with the dimensions specified in the instructions.

A signposted walking track commences from the public reserve at the end of Mount York Road. Near the summit, intermittent low cuttings are evident, with much later steps cut or built into the line of the actual road. (loc: –33.552892,150.220082). There is also a section of low stone wall running beside the track for about 20 metres (66 ft), giving the road formation a width of about 7 metres (23 ft). The physical evidence at the top of the pass is heavily overlaid by much more recent activity related to construction of the modern walking track and other erosion control and bush regeneration activities. Much modern work including low rock walling and new sandstone steps confuse and obscure the original nature of Cox's Road. About 100 metres (330 ft) from the summit the road divides, the early road continuing on the north (left) side and another early 1820s deviation to avoid the rocky outcrops to the south (right). The two descents rejoin after about 120 metres (390 ft).

The 1814 road features a very clear "Cox gutter" which curves down the hill. The gutter is up to 60 centimetres (24 in) high and is identified with an inset metal plaque. Slightly lower down the hill on a boulder to the left of the road, are three distinct rectangular sockets cut into the rock. Another plaque identifies these as likely to be sockets to take the rails for a timber fence. (loc –33.553019,150.222457). A timber-railed fence is shown in several of the early views of Cox's Pass, including three by J. W. Lewin in 1815 (showing two rails) and another by Pellion in 1819 (showing three rails). Cox's Journal also refers to the men and the carpenter splitting posts and rails "for fencing the road down the mountain". Close to the fence sockets, the same large boulder features a large area of rock cutting. This bears a plaque which states that the pick marks evident were made to allow Governor Macquarie's coach to pass along the route in 1815. This appears to be a fanciful interpretation made by the early reserve trustees as none of the journals for the Macquarie expedition mention such an event which would be expected to have delayed the journey for some time.

The 1814 road continues through a series of large rock outcrops, several with deep overhangs (loc: –33.553734,150.222437) which are apparently those Cox described as so "lofty and undermined" that the men of the road party were able to take shelter in them and "sleep dry". Dramatic large rock overhangs appear in several early views showing travel down Cox's Pass in the 1820s (possibly based on earlier drawings by Lewin). The distinctively shaped rocks illustrated in these images may still be seen on the Pass today.

About 30 metres (98 ft) below where the two road loops rejoin, the site of Cox's second "land bridge" is evident. (loc: –33.553548,150.223882). Another metal sign identifies this location. There is a flat stone outcrop which has rock-cut sockets and trenches 5.2 metres (17 ft) apart into which timber supports/ beams would have been placed. Cox's Journal also refers to two "large trees", 14-and-15-metre (45 and 50 ft) long respectively, which were "fixed as side pieces to the bridge". At the southern end of the bridge site there is also a 25-centimetre-wide (9.8 in) rock-cut drain which would have directed any water run-off from the steep hillside away from the bridge.

The bridge would have been finished with slabs as primitive decking fixed to the beams (effectively crude log stringers) the whole probably resting on a fill of earth and large broken stones quarried and "turned out" of the mountainside. The last work on this bridge was the placement of another tree 17 metres (55 ft) long and 2.7 metres (9 ft) in circumference which was "fixed as a side piece below the bridge and joining the rock". Cox records that the stonemason also completed some rock-work below the bridge. This is evident as a low rock retaining wall supporting the road below the bridge where there is a cutting on the upper side but the width of the road formation decreases from 5.2 to 4.0 metres (17 to 13 ft) wide.

The road continues to descend to the base of the hill in a northerly direction and on a steep gradient with a cut and fill formation, the fill comprising earth and remnants of possible stone rubble pavement. There are some areas of retaining wall and also of picked or chiselled cuttings, some of which are up to four metres (thirteen feet) high. One cutting bears the distinct letters WRP. It has been suggested that this inscription stands for "Western Road Party". It is unclear whether this inscription was related to the actual 1814 road party or to a slightly later phase, although its roman serif lettering is very similar in style to other inscriptions found on Colonial-era roads.

The road turns east to follow the natural contours of the topography and at the base of the hill the road line commences a series of zig-zag turns. It is in this vicinity, from the first curve to the base of the zig-zag turn, that the Lewin paintings showing the descent of Cox's Pass are likely to have been sketched. Upon reaching the valley floor the old road line diverges from the modern walking track. The modern track continues north to meet the line of Lockyer's Road, whilst Cox's Road turned to the northwest where it enters private property. The walking track continues past the Lockyer's Road track junction to emerge in a picnic area beside the Hartley Vale Road.

Within the private property Lot 102 DP 751644 there are two sections of early road formation present within an area of grassed paddock.

A section of early road is cut into a small rise with a part rock and part earth- faced cutting and a crude, low rubble stone retaining wall. This section extends for approximately 75 metres (246 ft) and is between 3 and 4 metres (9.8 and 13.1 ft) wide, that is approximating the "4-metre (12 ft)" width given in the instructions for the 1814 road. A number of mature trees have now grown within parts of the old road formation. From the top of the small rise the 1814 road would have turned to the west to skirt around the base of Mount York. Due to the swampy nature of the ground in parts of this area it is unlikely that any clear evidence of the 1814 road survives until the line re-joins the present-day Fields Road/Mid Hartley Road.

By the time that the road was re-surveyed by James McBrien in 1823, Cox' s Road had been deviated away from the problematic, wet and swampy ground. The 1823 survey shows the road heading further north and forming a much larger curve away from the base of Mount York.

Evidence of a slightly later road line also exists within private property. This comprises another earth formation benched into a hillside with another low stone retaining wall which is present about 70 metres (230 ft) northeast of the 1814 road. Whilst the earlier road has mostly unworked field stones, the walling of the later road includes better prepared, roughly hammered, squared and shaped blocks which form up to three courses of walling, sometimes only placed as stack-bonding. This walling has characteristics typical of early 1820s work. Up to 100 metres (330 ft) of road is clearly evident, which turns northwest to follow the contour around a small hill, before heading further north into adjacent private property.

The State Heritage Register listing of Cox's Road and Early Deviations includes six precincts of Cox's Road:

- Cox's Road and Early Deviations – Linden, Linden Precinct – HC Plan 2639
- Cox's Road and Early Deviations – Woodford, Old Bathurst Road Precinct – HC Plan 2640
- Cox's Road and Early Deviations – Woodford, Appian Way Precinct – HC Plan 2641
- Cox's Road and Early Deviations – Mount York, Cox's Pass Precinct – HC Plan 2642
- Cox's Road and Early Deviations – Hartley, Clarence Hilly Range / Mount Blaxland Precinct – HC Plan 2643
- Cox's Road and Early Deviations – Sodwalls, Fish River Descent Precinct – HC Plan 2644

=== Condition ===
As at 1 December 2014, the road is substantially intact. Numerous archaeological features from the 1814 road are evident including road fabric, gutters, cuttings, rock-cut drains, bridge sites and inscriptions.

=== Further information ===
During 2013 extensive work was undertaken in the Mount York Reserve to refurbish existing monuments and install interpretative signage. That work included a sign specifically related to Cox's Road.

== Heritage listing ==
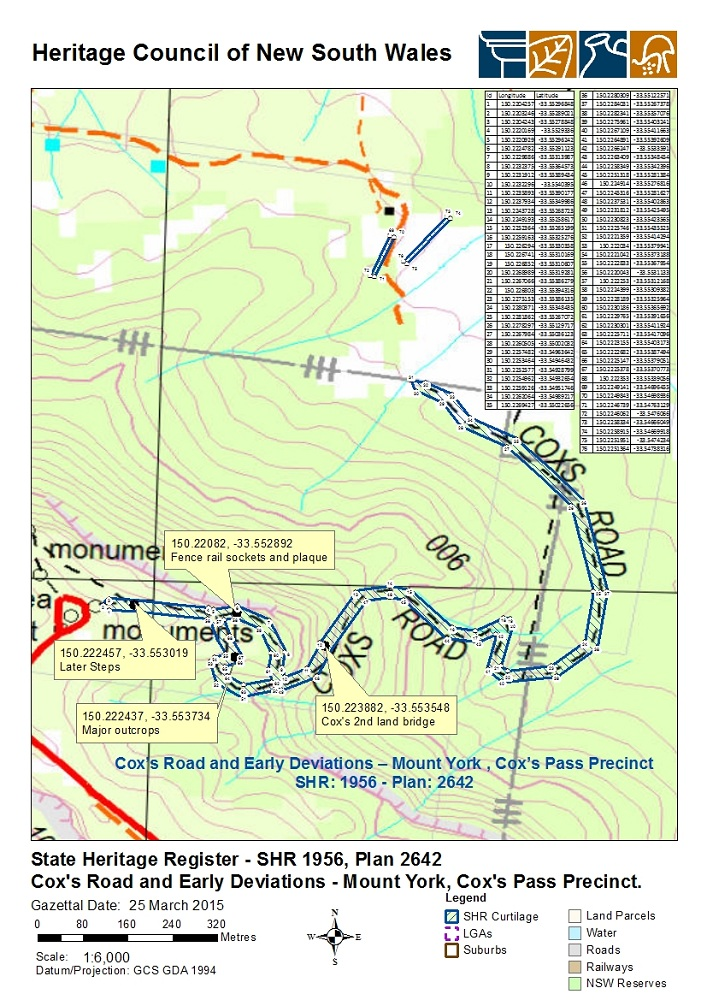
Heritage boundaries show the route of the road

As at 10 February 2015, the surviving remnants of Cox's Road, built 1814 to 1815, have state significance as the earliest road across the Blue Mountains and the first structure built by Europeans west of the Blue Mountains. Building of this road followed from the prior exploration by Gregory Blaxland, William Lawson and William Wentworth, and the survey by George Evans. The successful construction of the road was symbolic of the conquest of the natural barrier created by the Blue Mountains, and represented Governor Macquarie's vision for the ongoing development of the colony beyond Sydney and its immediate surrounds. Cox's Road enabled the later opening of the hinterland beyond the Blue Mountains for subsequent settlement, pastoral and agricultural expansion, which then escalated the dispossession of Aboriginal peoples from their lands.

William Cox was well known among convicts for his power to recommend pardons and tickets of leave. Most of the convicts who volunteered for the work to open a track to the interior were emancipated, receiving Pardons or Tickets of Leave on completion of the work.

The surviving road fabric demonstrates the crude and hurried nature of Cox's work, and the techniques used in tracing, cutting and forming the road. In conjunction with later colonial road alignments on the mountains and elsewhere, Cox's Road also forms part of a suite of roads demonstrating the wide range of road building styles and standards employed during the colonial period.

Cox's Road and Early Deviations – Mount York, Cox's Pass Precinct was listed on the New South Wales State Heritage Register on 25 March 2015 having satisfied the following criteria.

The place is important in demonstrating the course, or pattern, of cultural or natural history in New South Wales.

Surviving remnants of Cox's Road have state historical significance as physical evidence of the first road constructed across the Blue Mountains from Emu Plains to the Bathurst Plains (1814–15). Constructed in 1814–15 Cox's Road is one of the earliest Colonial-era road-lines surviving in Australia. The 1814 road is tangible evidence of the development of the colony at Sydney and of the expansion of white settlement into western NSW. The road symbolises the occupation of the country and Governor Macquarie's aspirations for the eventual opening of the interior to European settlement after the discovery of the Western plains by G W Evans in 1814. In this respect the 1814–1815 Cox's Road has considerable symbolic significance as an official public work which laid the foundations for future development. Cox's Road is linked with the foundation of Bathurst, the first inland settlement in NSW, which was proclaimed by Governor Macquarie on 7 May 1815 after his journey along the road.

Historically, Cox's Pass at Mount York became heavily imbued with symbolic cultural meaning commencing with the lavish praise given by Governor Macquarie in 1815 and then through the series of traveller's accounts and artworks which featured the Pass in subsequent years. This was further exemplified in the extravagant rhetoric about explorers, visionary Governors, road-builders and pioneers during the "First Crossing" Centenary Celebrations held at Mount York in 1913 which was partially repeated in recent Bicentennial commemorations in May 2013.

The place has a strong or special association with a person, or group of persons, of importance of cultural or natural history of New South Wales's history.

The surviving remnants of Cox's Road have state significance for their close association with Governor Lachlan Macquarie who commissioned the building of the road into the interior, and with the magistrate and ex-army officer Captain William Cox, who supervised the building of the road. The road is also associated with the convicts who laboured on the road to obtain their liberty, and with the officers and men who assisted Cox such as Thomas Hobby, Richard Lewis, John Tighe and Samuel Ayres. The crossing of the Blue Mountains, the surveying of a route to Bathurst and the building of Cox's Road were significant events in the period of Macquarie's governorship. Governor Macquarie's view of the importance of the road is demonstrated by his reports to Earl Bathurst, the British Secretary of State for War and the Colonies, and by his journey to the Bathurst Plains immediately after its construction, where he proclaimed the site for the Bathurst township.

William Cox's achievement using a small group of convict men in a short period of time and with no loss of life caused by road-making or other substantial difficulties, was reflective of his reputation as a more humane employer and magistrate than many of his contemporaries. The leadership qualities, vision and skill he showed constructing the road would also be evident in later government contracts won by Cox for other public works .

Cox's Pass at Mount York was specifically named by Governor Macquarie to 'perpetuate the memory of Mr Cox's services' and as "a just tribute due to his indefatigable zeal and meritorious exertions".

The place is important in demonstrating aesthetic characteristics and/or a high degree of creative or technical achievement in New South Wales.

The surviving precincts of Cox's Road have state technical significance for their ability to demonstrate simple, pre 1820s road building techniques. Improvement of the 1814 route throughout the 1820s also provide important evidence of later road building techniques and demonstrates the ongoing use of this key route to the interior, before it was superseded by the new Great Western Road laid out by Sir Thomas Mitchell in the 1830s.

Cox's Pass at Mount York is one of the most significant and intact precincts of Cox' s Road for its ability to demonstrate the methods and approaches adopted, and the results achieved, by William Cox and the convicts of the 1814 road party. Cox's Pass also has primary physical evidence which records and displays later attempts to improve some of the most difficult sections before the 1814 road was superseded by new road lines in the 1820s.

The place has a strong or special association with a particular community or cultural group in New South Wales for social, cultural or spiritual reasons.

Cox's Road and its remnants are demonstrated as having social significance at a state level by the substantial interest in identifying and promoting Cox's Road for cultural tourism and education, and celebrating the bicentenary of the road by the general public, state and local government bodies and a range of community organisations. The road is of particular importance to Cox descendants. The William Cox Fellowship first nominated sections of Cox's Road for heritage listing in the 1980s.

The place has potential to yield information that will contribute to an understanding of the cultural or natural history of New South Wales.

Precincts of Cox's Road have research significance at a state level for their ability to demonstrate early nineteenth century road, culvert and bridge building techniques using basic skills and technologies. The remains of the 1814-15 road illustrate the conditions of the period and contribute to an understanding of the process of exploration and development, and of early colonial road building and road use. The remains represent a major physical, technological and engineering achievement and exhibit fine details of workmanship. Several precincts of the 1814-15 road have specific archaeological potential.

The place possesses uncommon, rare or endangered aspects of the cultural or natural history of New South Wales.

Surviving precincts of the 1814–1815 Cox's Road from Penrith to Bathurst are rare examples of early Colonial road building in NSW. The surviving remnants of Cox's Road have state significance as a rare example of pre 1820 road building based on the use of manual and primitive tools, and predating the more sophisticated road survey and construction techniques employed on the later "Great Roads" of the 1820s and 1830s.

== See also ==
- Cox's Road and Early Deviations – Hartley, Clarence Hilly Range and Mount Blaxland Precinct
- Cox's Road and Early Deviations – Linden, Linden Precinct
- Cox's Road and Early Deviations – Sodwalls, Fish River Descent Precinct
- Cox's Road and Early Deviations – Woodford, Appian Way Precinct
- Cox's Road and Early Deviations – Woodford, Old Bathurst Road Precinct
- Convicts in Australia

== Bibliography ==
- "Government and General Orders, 10 June 1815". 1815.
- Whitaker, A H C (2014). William Cox and Cox's Road: A Bicentenary Souvenir.
- Karskens, G. (1988). 'Cox's Way: An Historical and Archaeological Study of Cox's Road and Early Crossings of the Blue Mountains, NSW'.
- L.Macquarie (1979). Journals of His Tours in New South Wales and Van Diemens Land 1810-1822.
- Lavelle, Siobhan (2013). 1813: A Tale that Grew in the Telling.
- Cox, William (1901). Memoirs of William Cox, JP.
- Cox, William. "('Journal Kept by Mr Cox in making a road across the Blue Mountains from Emu Plains to a new country discovered by Mr Evans to the Westward'".
