= Cox's Road and Early Deviations - Woodford, Old Bathurst Road Precinct =

Historic road in New South Wales, Australia

Cox's Road and Early Deviations – Woodford, Old Bathurst Road Precinct
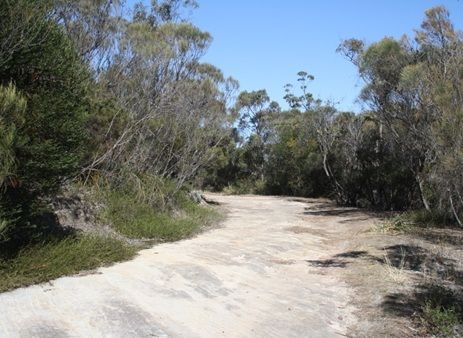

- Location within New South Wales Location within Australia
- 33°43′42″S 150°29′27″E
- Location: Old Bathurst Road, Woodford, City of Blue Mountains, New South Wales, Australia

History
- Built: 1814–

Site notes
- Architect: William Cox

New South Wales Heritage Register
- Official name: Cox's Road and Early Deviations – Woodford, Old Bathurst Road Precinct; 1814 Road; Old Bathurst Road; Old Western Road; Coxs Road
- Type: State heritage (complex / group)
- Designated: 31 July 2015
- Reference no.: 1954
- Type: Road
- Category: Transport – Land
- Builders: William Cox; Convict Road Party

Cox's Road and Early Deviations – Woodford, Old Bathurst Road Precinct is a heritage-listed former colonial road and now fire trail and road located at Old Bathurst Road, Woodford in the City of Blue Mountains local government area of New South Wales, Australia. It was designed and built by William Cox from 1814, with the support of a convict road party. It is also known as 1814 Road, Old Bathurst Road, Old Western Road and Coxs Road. It was added to the New South Wales State Heritage Register on 31 July 2015.

== History ==
The road from Emu Ford to Bathurst, a distance of 163.3 kilometres (101.5 mi) was completed in only six months during 1814 and 1815 by a working party composed mostly of convicts. Governor Lachlan Macquarie decided to have a carriage road constructed across the Blue Mountains, to the country which had been "newly discovered" by Europeans in 1813. Cox assembled a team of thirty convicts and eight guards to build the road across the Blue Mountains. He was assisted by two Aboriginal men: Colebee from the Darug Tribe and the Boorooerongal Clan and Joe from the Mulgoa Clan.

The so-called "First Crossing" of 1813 took place on the traditional lands of the Dharug, Gundungurra, and Wiradjuri people. Other routes through the ridges and valleys of the Blue Mountains had been used by Aboriginal people for tens of thousands of years.

Cox was born in Wimborne Minster, Dorset in 1764. He married Rebecca Upjohn at Clerkenwell, London in 1789. Cox arrived in NSW on board the "Minerva" in January 1800. Cox became Chief Magistrate at Windsor in 1810 and in July 1814 Governor Macquarie made William Cox the Superintendent of the works for a new road over the Blue Mountains. His first wife died in 1819 and Cox married Anna Blachford in 1821. He died on 15 March 1837.

Cox's road party reached the Linden area by late August 1814, and remained at Linden–Woodford until around mid-September, by which time they had moved on to the present day vicinity of Hazelbrook. It was the first time they encountered the steep rocky platforms and the ever-narrowing ridge. Cox's style of road-building was pragmatic and primitive. Confronted with rocky platforms and sharp drops, he generally had his men clear the flattest parts, removing an "immense quantity of rock" where necessary, and usually marking out the line with shallow chiselled gutters and utilising the rock platform as a pavement; where the road ran over the shallow soils, it was often marked out by rows or low walls of rough, broken stone.

The construction and completion of the road are recorded in Cox's Journal. Cox's journal indicates that three areas, in particular, required extensive cutting through rocky outcrops, at Linden to Woodford, Wentworth Falls and the descent at Mount York.

Cox wrote describing the Linden–Woodford area as follows:

Sunday, 11 September: Went 3 miles forward to examine the road with Mr Hobby and Lewis. From the bridge [at Linden] it continues rocky over two or three small passes to Caley's pile; from thence at least two miles further, the mountain is nearly a solid rock. At places high broken rocks; at others is very hanging and shelving, which makes it impossible to make a good level road. The more the road is used the better it will be. Friday, 16 September: Removed forward; found the road completed to 21 miles. At the latter end of this the ground was completely covered with gum roots. Was obliged to turn all hands to grubbing and finishing the road, and with very hard labour nearly completed the 22nd mile by Saturday night.

— William Cox's journal, 1814.

The actual building of the road involved the definition of a trafficable route which was then cleared of vegetation (trees being cut-off below ground level but rarely "grubbed out"), boulders, and rocky outcrops. The formation of the road itself was as minimal as the terrain allowed, with low side-cuttings and embankments as necessary. In very rocky terrain cuttings were made into the mountain itself, the natural rock providing the road surface or pavement. It is possible that some of the stepped rock platforms may have initially been partly filled or levelled with earthen ramps, although Karskens (1988) suggests that Cox mostly left the road pavement in an unformed, natural state due to the haste with which the road was being constructed.

By 1817, (and for two decades after) the Linden to Woodford section was according to botanist, Allan Cunningham, "the most rugged and oppressive stage of the whole journey on account of the sandstone rocks on which the road is formed". He also noticed that the NSW Government carters had already created "small circuitous routes in the bush".

Even if it was initially partly filled or shaped, much of the original surface of the road weathered away quickly, as by 1819 it was reported that the stumps of the trees which had been left within the roadway were becoming exposed. Numerous accounts of subsequent journeys over the Cox's Road in the "Twenty Mile Hollow" area (between Linden and Woodford) describe the difficult passage over the slippery sandstone surface and the uncomfortable jolting over the stepped rock platforms. It also appears that some minor secondary routes and deviations from the main track were also developed from an early period in order to avoid some of the more difficult descents. In 1824 it was reported that: "Four miles beyond Springwood [the road] becomes rough, rocky and at times very difficult. It has been necessary to cut it through rocks, and sometimes to fill the hollows of the gullies. The road is often made of the sandstone itself, and so it is slippery and difficult for horses and vehicles."

From the 1820s onwards, the earlier lines of the road were upgraded and although short sections of Cox's Road were later adopted as parts of the local road network (eg. part of Burke Road, Linden and Old Bathurst Road, and Taylor Road, Woodford) most of the original Cox's Road appears to have gone out of use with the completion of new road deviations by convict gangs during the 1820s and 1830s. When Mrs Louisa Meredith travelled through the area in 1839 she still endured the jolting and bumping over the "jumpers", the rock steps of Cox's Road and she wrote also that 'The track we are now traversing usually winds "terrace-wise along the side of a steep mountain, and is barely wide enough anywhere to allow of two vehicles passing each other".

== Description ==
William Cox had been instructed by Governor Macquarie only to open a rough cart road, so that the new lands found in the western plains would be symbolically open. The road from Emu Ford to Bathurst, a distance of 163.3 kilometres (101.5 mi) was completed in only six months. Macquarie's instructions specified that the road should be at least 3.7 metres (12 ft) wide in order that two carts would be able to pass each other, and that the timber should be cleared on each side so that the road corridor was 6.1 metres (20 ft) wide. Stumps were to be grubbed out and any holes should be filled in. This was the method adopted in relatively easy terrain, although later travellers reported that the stumps had not always been removed and the surviving physical evidence shows relatively few locations where the extant road conforms with the dimensions specified in the instructions.

The Old Bathurst Road section of Cox's Road at Woodford is one of the most easily accessible, largely intact, and still clearly recognisable surviving sections of the 1814 road within the Blue Mountains. It extends for over a kilometre beside and overlapping with an unsurfaced local road along the top of the ridge. It can be accessed either from Hepburn Road or from Old Bathurst Road and Taylor Road, Woodford.

The remains of the 1814 road are the central feature of the ridge-top landscape. They relate historically, physically, and visually to the undisturbed bush landscape to the east and to the various later transport and settlement developments to the west. From the apex of the ridge near the Woodford Trig Station, there are extensive views on both sides of the road which conform with those described by early travellers giving a sense of the experience of travel along the early 19th-century road even though parts of the surrounding area have been gradually developed with infrastructure such as sewerage pumping stations, pipelines and electricity power poles.

This section of the 1814 Cox's Road extends for approximately 1.2 kilometres (0.75 mi). The 1814 road occupies the crest of the south running ridge, partly within the line of a more modern unsealed access track which leads from Hepburn Road to the Woodford Trig station and partly within adjoining private property allotments, most of which remain undeveloped. From the Woodford Trig Station the road continues past the Rockcorry Cottages where it is known as Old Bathurst Road. The road then coincides with modern Taylor Road for at least 650 metres (2,130 ft).

Once the modern roughly formed vehicular access track leads off Hepburn Road at Linden, the remains of the Cox's Road evident consist primarily of a series of intermittent kerb-lines or low side-cuttings, some with shallow gutters or drains, which have been cut into the surface of the exposed sandstone rock platforms of the ridge. On the basis of the generally intended width of the road noted in the documentary evidence, and by observation of the topography, it is also possible to infer the probable position and line of the early road formation.

Between Hepburn Road and the Woodford Trigonometrical Station (TS483) at least sixteen sections of side-cutting or kerbing relating to Cox's Road are present, along with a taller picked rock-face and curved side drain apparently associated with, but slightly away from, the road formation.

Immediately west of the Woodford Trig Station, kerb-lines are cut on both sides of the road which extend here for 25 metres (82 ft), but mostly the kerb appears to be marked on only one side of the road formation. A fence marks private property here, where the road lies within Lot 2, DP 1083452, but the old road can be clearly viewed from outside. (loc: –33.726737,150.49331).

The width of the old road formation varies between 6.6 metres (22 ft) in the area between the two side kerb-lines near the Woodford Trig station, to about 4 metres (13 ft). These are wider dimensions than those specified in Macquarie's road building Instructions. The height of most kerb-lines is in the range of 5 to 10 centimetres (2.0 to 3.9 in) but may reach a maximum of about 40 centimetres (16 in). Most of the kerbs are cut with vertical faces. Two types of marks are evident, implying the use of different tools during the cutting. Tools used would have included picks and mallets with pointed chisels or gads; as well as crow-bars, sledgehammers and wedges. Karskens (1988) has commented that the very low kerbs would "serve little practical purpose except as slight drainage, but they marked the edge of the road for the guidance of travellers in these wild, barren and isolated expanses." The most extensive, but often quite shallow, kerb-line occurs on the western side of the road, towards the northern end of the extant 1814 road formation. This section extends for a total length of about 40 metres (130 ft), although not all of the kerb is fully exposed. (loc: –33.724190,150.494412).

Two types of pavement are evident along this surviving section of Cox's Road. Much of the road in this area utilises the natural rock platform, some areas of which appear to have been partly "knocked-off" or picked away. Some areas also have deep ruts, apparently caused by both early and more recent traffic along the road. At the northern end, parts of the road formation or pavement appear to have been partly filled with small rock pieces or broken stone packing and the naturally occurring sandy earth loam.

South of the Woodford Trig station past the Rockcorry Cottages, there is a cutting along the south side of the road and a solid sheet stone pavement. As the road continues south there are sections of early stone retaining wall on the east side of Old Bathurst Road. Two sections of walling are about 20 metres (66 ft) long. The stonework is of two types, basic rubble work and very primitive coursed work, suggesting that there may be more than one phase of construction. It is likely that the better quality coursed work might relate to later 1820s improvements made to the earlier road. From Taylor Road the 1814 formation makes a brief dog-leg, then heads further west, continuing close to the southern side of the railway line before re-emerging near Woodford Railway Station.

In the vicinity of the Woodford Trig station in addition to the line of the 1814 road, there are a number of other early tracks including a loop to the east. It is likely that these are some of the early diversions made to avoid jolting over the slippery rock platforms of the original 1814 road. These were described by numerous travellers.

The proposed State Heritage Register listing of Cox's Road and Early Deviations includes six precincts of Cox's Road:

- Cox's Road and Early Deviations – Linden, Linden Precinct – HC Plan 2639
- Cox's Road and Early Deviations – Woodford, Old Bathurst Road Precinct – HC Plan 2640
- Cox's Road and Early Deviations – Woodford, Appian Way Precinct – HC Plan 2641
- Cox's Road and Early Deviations – Mount York, Cox's Pass Precinct – HC Plan 2642
- Cox's Road and Early Deviations – Hartley, Clarence Hilly Range / Mount Blaxland Precinct – HC Plan 2643
- Cox's Road and Early Deviations – Sodwalls, Fish River Descent Precinct – HC Plan 2644

=== Condition ===
As at 17 November 2014, the condition of the road was good and substantially intact. Numerous archaeological features from the 1814 road are evident including road fabric, gutters, cuttings.

=== Modifications and dates ===
- 1817; 1824

== Heritage listing ==
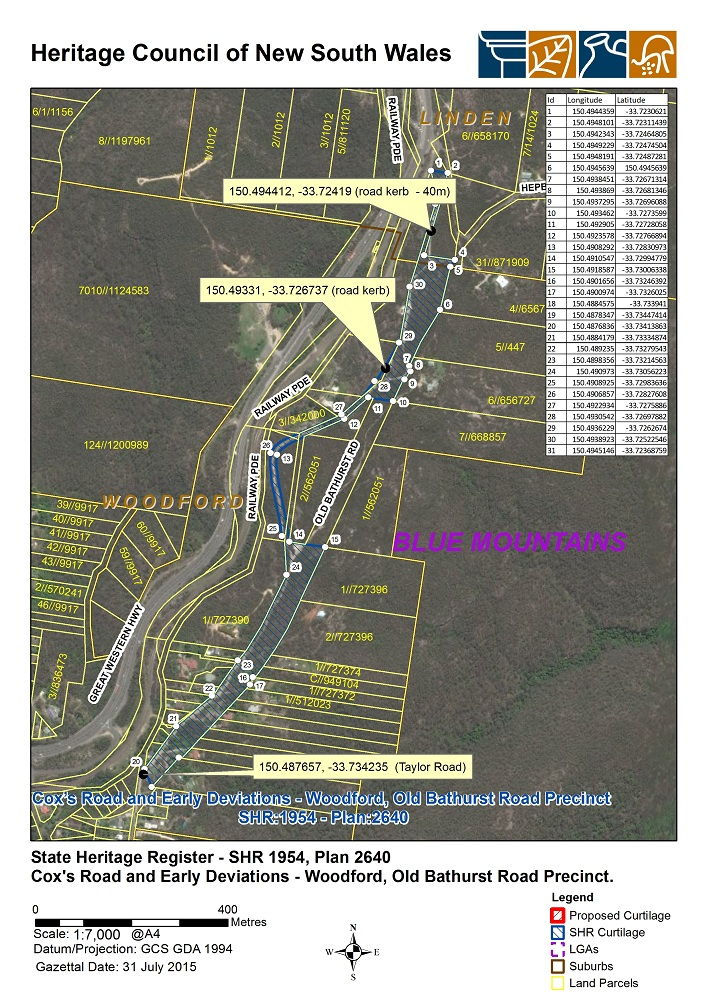
Heritage boundaries shows the route of the road

As at 5 August 2015, The surviving remnants of Cox's Road, built 1814 to 1815, have state significance as the earliest road across the Blue Mountains and the first structure built by Europeans west of the Blue Mountains. Building of this road followed from the prior exploration by Gregory Blaxland, William Lawson and William Wentworth, and the survey by George Evans. The successful construction of the road was symbolic of the conquest of the natural barrier created by the Blue Mountains, and represented Governor Macquarie's vision for the ongoing development of the colony beyond Sydney and its immediate surrounds. Cox's Road enabled the later opening of the hinterland beyond the Blue Mountains for subsequent settlement, pastoral and agricultural expansion, which then escalated the dispossession of Aboriginal peoples from their lands.

William Cox was well known among convicts for his power to recommend pardons and tickets of leave. Most of the convicts who volunteered for the work to open a track to the interior were emancipated, receiving pardons or Tickets of Leave on completion of the work.

The surviving road fabric demonstrates the crude and hurried nature of Cox's work, and the techniques used in tracing, cutting and forming the road. In conjunction with later colonial road alignments on the mountains and elsewhere, Cox's Road also forms part of a suite of roads demonstrating the wide range of road building styles and standards employed during the colonial period.

Cox's Road and Early Deviations – Woodford, Old Bathurst Road Precinct was listed on the New South Wales State Heritage Register on 31 July 2015 having satisfied the following criteria.

The place is important in demonstrating the course, or pattern, of cultural or natural history in New South Wales.

Constructed in 1814–15 Cox's Road is one of the earliest Colonial-era road-lines surviving in Australia. The 1814 road is tangible evidence of the development of the colony at Sydney and of the expansion of white settlement into western NSW. The road symbolises the occupation of the country and Governor Macquarie's aspirations for the eventual opening of the interior to European settlement after the discovery of the Western plains by G. W. Evans in 1814. In this respect the 1814–1815 Cox's Road has considerable symbolic significance as an official public work which laid the foundations for future development. Cox's Road is linked with the foundation of Bathurst, the first inland settlement in NSW, which was proclaimed by Governor Macquarie on 7 May 1815 after his journey along the road. Surviving remnants of Cox's Road have State historical significance as physical evidence of the first road constructed across the Blue Mountains from Emu Plains to the Bathurst Plains (1814–15).

The place has a strong or special association with a person, or group of persons, of importance of cultural or natural history of New South Wales's history.

The surviving remnants of Cox's Road have State significance for their close association with Governor Lachlan Macquarie who commissioned the building of the road into the interior, and with the magistrate and ex-army officer Captain William Cox, who supervised the building of the road. The road is also associated with the convicts who laboured on the road to obtain their liberty, and with the officers and men who assisted Cox such as Thomas Hobby, Richard Lewis, John Tighe and Samuel Ayres. The crossing of the Blue Mountains, the surveying of a route to Bathurst and the building of Cox's Road were significant events in the period of Macquarie's governorship. Governor Macquarie's view of the importance of the road is demonstrated by his reports to Earl Bathurst, the British Secretary of State for War and the Colonies, and by his journey to the Bathurst Plains immediately after its construction, where he proclaimed the site for the Bathurst township.

William Cox's achievement using a small group of convict men in a short period of time and with no loss of life caused by road-making or other substantial difficulties, was reflective of his reputation as a more humane employer and magistrate than many of his contemporaries. The leadership qualities, vision and skill he showed constructing the road would also be evident in later government contracts won by Cox for other public works.

The place is important in demonstrating aesthetic characteristics and/or a high degree of creative or technical achievement in New South Wales.

The surviving precincts of Cox's Road have state technical significance for their ability to demonstrate simple, pre 1820s road building techniques. Improvement of the 1814 route throughout the 1820s also provide important evidence of later road building techniques and demonstrates the ongoing use of this key route to the interior, before it was superseded by the new Great Western Road laid out by Sir Thomas Mitchell in the 1830s.

The Old Bathurst Road Precinct of Cox's Road is one of the longest, largely intact and still legible surviving sections of the 1814 road. It extends for over a kilometre beside and overlapping with an unsurfaced local road along the top of the ridge. The remains of the 1814 road are the central feature of the ridge-top landscape. They relate historically, physically and visually to the undisturbed landscape to the east and to the various later transport and settlement developments to the west. From the apex of the ridge near the Woodford Trig Station there are extensive views on both sides of the road which conform with those described by early travellers giving a sense of the experience of travel along the early nineteenth century road even though parts of the surrounding area have been gradually developed with infrastructure such as sewerage pumping stations, pipelines and electricity power poles.

The place has a strong or special association with a particular community or cultural group in New South Wales for social, cultural or spiritual reasons.

Cox's Road and its remnants are demonstrated as having social significance by the substantial interest in identifying and promoting Cox's Road for cultural tourism and education, and celebrating the bicentenary of the road by the general public, state and local government bodies and a range of community organisations. The road is of particular importance to Cox descendants. The William Cox Fellowship first nominated sections of Cox's Road for heritage listing in the 1980s.

The place has potential to yield information that will contribute to an understanding of the cultural or natural history of New South Wales.

Precincts of Cox's Road have research significance at a State level for their ability to demonstrate early nineteenth century road, culvert and bridge building techniques using basic skills and technologies. The remains of the 1814–15 road illustrate the conditions of the period and contribute to an understanding of the process of exploration and development, and of early colonial road building and road use. The remains represent a major physical, technological and engineering achievement and exhibit fine details of workmanship. Several precincts of the 1814–15 road have specific archaeological potential.

The place possesses uncommon, rare or endangered aspects of the cultural or natural history of New South Wales.

Surviving precincts of the 1814–1815 Cox's Road from Penrith to Bathurst are rare examples of early Colonial road building in NSW. The surviving remnants of Cox's Road have State significance as a rare example of pre 1820 road building based on the use of manual and primitive tools, and predating the more sophisticated road survey and construction techniques employed on the later "Great Roads" of the 1820s and 1830s.

== See also ==
- Cox's Road and Early Deviations – Hartley, Clarence Hilly Range and Mount Blaxland Precinct
- Cox's Road and Early Deviations – Linden, Linden Precinct
- Cox's Road and Early Deviations – Mount York, Cox's Pass Precinct
- Cox's Road and Early Deviations – Sodwalls, Fish River Descent Precinct
- Cox's Road and Early Deviations – Woodford, Appian Way Precinct
- Convicts in Australia
