= Cox's Road and Early Deviations - Woodford, Appian Way Precinct =

Historic road in New South Wales, Australia

Cox's Road and Early Deviations – Woodford, Appian Way Precinct
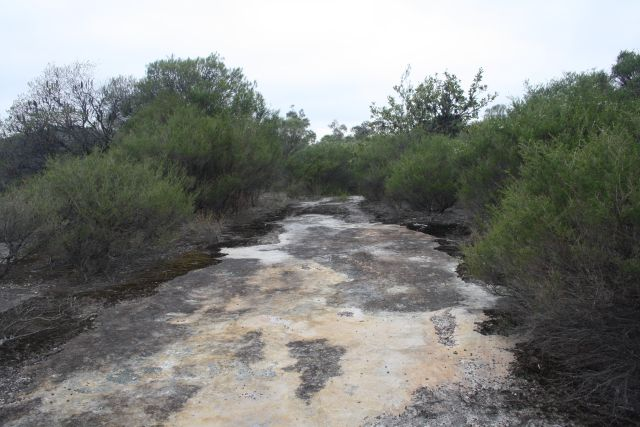

- Location within New South Wales Location within Australia
- 33°44′03″S 150°29′03″E
- Location: The Appian Way (off), Woodford, City of Blue Mountains, New South Wales, Australia

History
- Built: 1814–1825

Site notes
- Architect: William Cox

New South Wales Heritage Register
- Official name: Cox's Road and Early Deviations – Woodford, Appian Way Precinct; Bathurst Road; Old Bathurst Road; Coxs Road
- Type: State heritage (complex / group)
- Designated: 25 March 2015
- Reference no.: 1955
- Type: Road
- Category: Transport – Land
- Builders: William Cox; Convict Road Party

The Cox's Road and Early Deviations – Woodford, Appian Way Precinct is a heritage-listed former colonial road and now access road off The Appian Way, near Woodford, in the City of Blue Mountains local government area of New South Wales, Australia. It was designed and built by William Cox between 1814 and 1825, with the assistance of a convict road party. It is also known as Bathurst Road; Old Bathurst Road and Coxs Road. It was added to the New South Wales State Heritage Register on 25 March 2015.

== History ==
The road from Emu Ford to Bathurst, a distance of 163.3 kilometres (101.5 mi) was completed in only six months during 1814 and 1815 by a working party composed mostly of convicts. Governor Lachlan Macquarie decided to have a carriage road constructed across the Blue Mountains, to the country which had been "newly discovered" by Europeans in 1813.

The so-called "First Crossing" of 1813 took place on the traditional lands of the Dharug, Gundungurra and Wiradjuri people. Other routes through the ridges and valleys of the Blue Mountains had been used by Aboriginal people for tens of thousands of years.

Cox was born in Wimborne Minster, Dorset in 1764. He married Rebecca Upjohn at Clerkenwell, London in 1789. Cox arrived in NSW on board the "Minerva" in January 1800. Cox became Chief Magistrate at Windsor in 1810 and in July 1814 Governor Macquarie made William Cox the Superintendent of the works for a new road over the Blue Mountains. His first wife died in 1819 and Cox married Anna Blachford in 1821. He died on 15 March 1837.

Cox's road party were in the Woodford area from early to mid-September 1814. The road-building in this area was pragmatic and primitive. Confronted with rocky platforms and sharp drops, Cox had his men clear the flattest parts, removing an "immense quantity of rock" where necessary, and usually marking out the line with shallow chiselled gutters and utilising the rock platform as a pavement; where the road ran over the shallow soils, it was often marked out by rows or low walls of rough, broken stone. The actual building of the road involved the definition of a trafficable route which was then cleared of vegetation (trees being cut-off below ground level but rarely "grubbed out"), boulders and rocky outcrops. The formation of the road itself was as minimal as the terrain allowed, with low side-cuttings and embankments as necessary.

The actual construction and completion of the road is recorded in Cox's Journal. The journal indicates that three areas in particular required extensive cutting through rocky outcrops; at Linden to Woodford, Wentworth Falls and the descent at Mount York.

The Appian Way Precinct is the last of the extant precincts located at Linden and Woodford where the Cox's Road was cut into the rocky ridge in 1814. It was superseded in the 1830s by a new road alignment, below and to the north. In 1831, when Surveyor W. R. Govett drew his "Trace of Blue Mountains Road and Range from Springwood to near Pembrokes hut" the new line near Twenty Mile Hollow was marked.

Discoveries of convict-built retaining walls and other features exposed by large-scale highway reconstruction during the 1990s, indicated that extensive work was undertaken in the Woodford area from about 1827 which escalated in the mid-1830s, when a new road line was selected, cut into the mountainside and reinforced by extensive convict-built masonry retaining walls. These were recorded and either relocated; reburied, part-reburied or demolished as the "Woodford Bends" Reconstruction of the Great Western Highway was completed.

A deep railway cutting was made alongside the Appian Way Precinct of Cox's Road it the 1860s, and this was re-used for the Great Western Highway realignment in the 1990s. A second railway cutting was made in 1896 which sheared off the western end of Cox's Road. That cutting was widened for the railway duplication in 1902 and is still in use as part of the Blue Mountains and Main Western Railway Line. The construction of The Appian Way road in 1912 also cut off the eastern end of Cox's Road. Nevertheless, a small section of 1814 road survived, which is now within operational railway land.

== Description ==
William Cox had been instructed by Governor Macquarie only to open a rough cart road, so that the new lands found in the western plains would be symbolically open. The road from Emu Ford to Bathurst, a distance of 163.3 kilometres (101.5 mi) was completed in only six months. Macquarie's instructions specified that the road should be at least 3.7 metres (12 ft) wide in order that two carts would be able to pass each other, and that the timber should be cleared on each side so that the road corridor was 6.1 metres (20 ft) wide. Stumps were to be grubbed out and any holes should be filled in. The surviving physical evidence shows relatively few locations where the extant road conforms with the dimensions specified in the instructions.

The section of road evident to the west of The Appian Way at Woodford, curves gently, enclosed by two deep cuttings for the railway and highway. Cox's Road is visible as a cleared section of broad and flat sheet stone pavement. A large shelved section of rock has an earthen embankment carrying the road over it. This illustrates the manner in which the other shelved sections may have originally (and subsequently) been made traversable.

At the east end, where the Cox's Road commences in this precinct, there is a cutting up to 1 metre high. This has a rough, irregular face, pitted with irregular chisel or pick marks and, here and there the thin (2-centimetre-wide (0.79 in)) semi-circular shafts, though scattered rather than in parallel formation. An area of similar rock-cutting reappears at the end of the precinct, where it curves but is cut off abruptly by the deep railway cutting to the south. In form this cutting is similar to examples on other Cox's Road precincts at Old Bathurst Road (Woodford) and Cox's Pass (Mount York).

As the road proceeds west, the slight embankment is supported by a low and rough rubble retaining wall (Type 1b) of 1–2 courses and up to 45 centimetres (18 in) high. It runs for approximately 40 metres and has a primitive stone box culvert at its centre (40 centimetres (16 in) wide by 20 centimetres (7.9 in) high) which comprises a single course of stone for the sides, a large roughly hewn stone as a lintel, and an earthen floor. The culvert is now silted up and the side drain which would have fed it is covered. It is not known whether Cox's men built culverts on the 1814-15 road. While the adjoining retaining wall matches other early sections in style, there are no other examples of stone culverts in the Cox's Road precincts on the mountains and two similar examples located on the Mount Blaxland precinct date from a later period. It is therefore possible that the culvert, and perhaps the retaining wall were part of post-1814 improvements and widening operations. The road is approximately 8 metres (26 ft) wide at the widest point. At the edge of the sheet stone pavement there are examples of rock-cut drainage lines. Given the extensive time and labour needed for these, they may also relate to road improvements after the original 1814 road or be related to later railway works.

The remains of a small rectangular stone structure (approx. 2 metres (6 ft 7 in) by 1 metre (3 ft 3 in)) are located 12 metres (39 ft) south of the road's edge. In 1988, Karskens noted that this resembled the station/stockade/hut remains found on the Great North Road, dating from the 1820s. Karskens also reported that an early hand-wrought iron tool, possibly the end of a pointed chisel or pick-axe was found on the surface of this mound, "strongly suggesting that it was connected with the early road works – perhaps a storage depot". There is also a series of other mounds of earth and stones approximately 2 metres in diameter closer to the edge of the road - these are possibly spoil heaps, either from early efforts to fill the rock-shelves or from later railway era works. The presence of the stone structure and other features gives this precinct of Cox's Road particular archaeological research potential.

The proposed State Heritage Register listing of Cox's Road and Early Deviations includes six precincts of Cox's Road:

- Cox's Road and Early Deviations – Linden, Linden Precinct – HC Plan 2639
- Cox's Road and Early Deviations – Woodford, Old Bathurst Road Precinct – HC Plan 2640
- Cox's Road and Early Deviations – Woodford, Appian Way Precinct – HC Plan 2641
- Cox's Road and Early Deviations – Mount York, Cox's Pass Precinct – HC Plan 2642
- Cox's Road and Early Deviations – Hartley, Clarence Hilly Range / Mount Blaxland Precinct – HC Plan 2643
- Cox's Road and Early Deviations – Sodwalls, Fish River Descent Precinct – HC Plan 2644

=== Condition ===
As at 1 December 2014, the road was substantially intact. Numerous archaeological features from the 1814 road are evident including road fabric, such as sheet rock pavement, a low wall and small culvert, rock cuttings and rock cut drains. There is also physical evidence of a small rectangular stone structure to the south of the road formation.

== Heritage listing ==
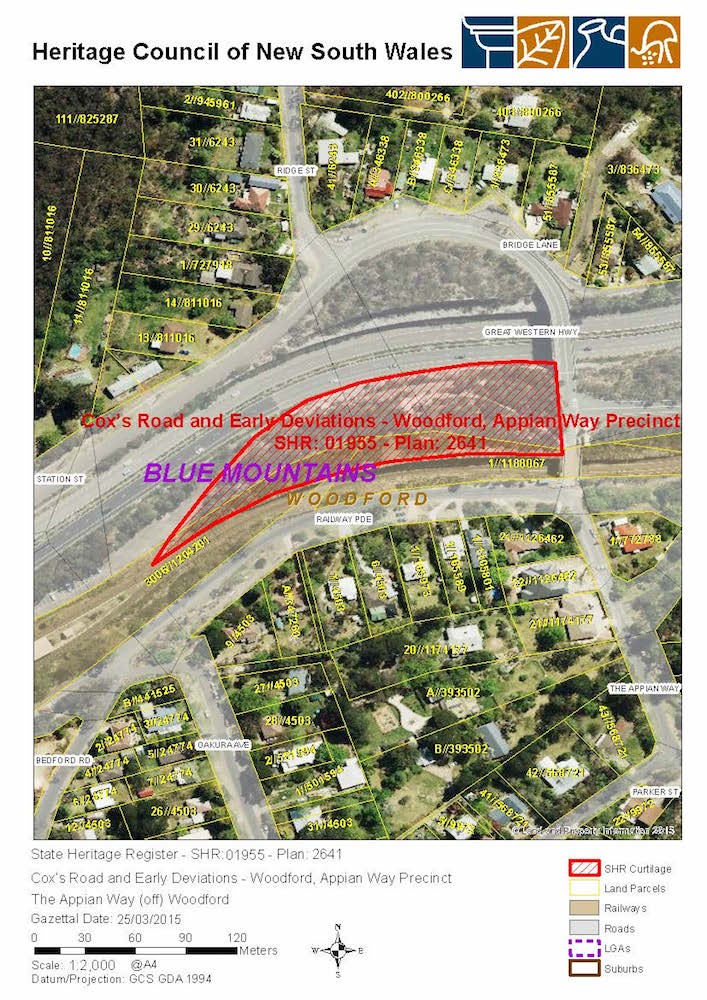
Heritage boundaries show the route of the road

As at 10 November 2014, the surviving remnants of Cox's Road, built 1814 to 1815, have state significance as the earliest road across the Blue Mountains and the first structure built by Europeans west of the Blue Mountains. Building of this road followed from the prior exploration by Gregory Blaxland, William Lawson and William Wentworth, and the survey by George Evans. The successful construction of the road was symbolic of the conquest of the natural barrier created by the Blue Mountains, and represented Governor Macquarie's vision for the ongoing development of the colony beyond Sydney and its immediate surrounds. Cox's Road enabled the later opening of the hinterland beyond the Blue Mountains for subsequent settlement, pastoral and agricultural expansion, which then escalated the dispossession of Aboriginal peoples from their lands.

William Cox was well known among convicts for his power to recommend pardons and tickets of leave. Most of the convicts who volunteered for the work to open a track to the interior were emancipated, receiving Pardons or Tickets of Leave on completion of the work.

The surviving road fabric demonstrates the crude and hurried nature of Cox's work, and the techniques used in tracing, cutting and forming the road. In conjunction with later colonial road alignments on the mountains and elsewhere, Cox's Road also forms part of a suite of roads demonstrating the wide range of road building styles and standards employed during the colonial period.

Cox's Road and Early Deviations – Woodford, Appian Way Precinct was listed on the New South Wales State Heritage Register on 25 March 2015 having satisfied the following criteria.

The place is important in demonstrating the course, or pattern, of cultural or natural history in New South Wales.

Surviving remnants of Cox's Road have state historical significance as physical evidence of the first road constructed across the Blue Mountains from Emu Plains to the Bathurst Plains (1814–15). Constructed in 1814–15 Cox's Road is one of the earliest Colonial-era road-lines surviving in Australia. The 1814 road is tangible evidence of the development of the colony at Sydney and of the expansion of white settlement into western NSW. The road symbolises the occupation of the country and Governor Macquarie's aspirations for the eventual opening of the interior to European settlement after the discovery of the Western plains by G W Evans in 1814. In this respect the 1814–1815 Cox's Road has considerable symbolic significance as an official public work which laid the foundations for future development. Cox's Road is linked with the foundation of Bathurst, the first inland settlement in NSW, which was proclaimed by Governor Macquarie on 7 May 1815 after his journey along the road.

The place has a strong or special association with a person, or group of persons, of importance of cultural or natural history of New South Wales's history.

The surviving remnants of Cox's Road have state significance for their close association with Governor Lachlan Macquarie who commissioned the building of the road into the interior, and with the magistrate and ex-army officer Captain William Cox, who supervised the building of the road. The road is also associated with the convicts who laboured on the road to obtain their liberty, and with the officers and men who assisted Cox such as Thomas Hobby, Richard Lewis, John Tighe and Samuel Ayres. The crossing of the Blue Mountains, the surveying of a route to Bathurst and the building of Cox's Road were significant events in the period of Macquarie's governorship. Governor Macquarie's view of the importance of the road is demonstrated by his reports to Earl Bathurst, the British Secretary of State for War and the Colonies, and by his journey to the Bathurst Plains immediately after its construction, where he proclaimed the site for the Bathurst township.

William Cox's achievement using a small group of convict men in a short period of time and with no loss of life caused by road-making or other substantial difficulties, was reflective of his reputation as a more humane employer and magistrate than many of his contemporaries. The leadership qualities, vision and skill he showed constructing the road would also be evident in later government contracts won by Cox for other public works.

The place is important in demonstrating aesthetic characteristics and/or a high degree of creative or technical achievement in New South Wales.

The surviving precincts of Cox's Road have state technical significance for their ability to demonstrate simple, pre 1820s road building techniques. Improvement of the 1814 route throughout the 1820s also provide important evidence of later road building techniques and demonstrates the ongoing use of this key route to the interior, before it was superseded by the new Great Western Road laid out by Sir Thomas Mitchell in the 1830s.

The Appian Way Precinct of Cox's Road provides an excellent and self-contained example of the type of work done on the stoney Woodford ridge. This precinct neatly encapsulates several key features of early road building, including cuttings, sheet stone pavements, low rock walling, and a very small and primitive culvert. The structural remains and mounds have considerable archaeological potential.

The place has a strong or special association with a particular community or cultural group in New South Wales for social, cultural or spiritual reasons.

Cox's Road and its remnants are demonstrated as having social significance at a state level by the substantial interest in identifying and promoting Cox's Road for cultural tourism and education, and celebrating the bicentenary of the road by the general public, state and local government bodies and a range of community organisations. The road is of particular importance to Cox descendants. The William Cox Fellowship first nominated sections of Cox's Road for heritage listing in the 1980s.

The place has potential to yield information that will contribute to an understanding of the cultural or natural history of New South Wales.

Precincts of Cox's Road have research significance at a state level for their ability to demonstrate early nineteenth century road, culvert and bridge building techniques using basic skills and technologies. The remains of the 1814–15 road illustrate the conditions of the period and contribute to an understanding of the process of exploration and development, and of early colonial road building and road use. The remains represent a major physical, technological and engineering achievement and exhibit fine details of workmanship. Several precincts of the 1814–15 road have specific archaeological potential.

The place possesses uncommon, rare or endangered aspects of the cultural or natural history of New South Wales.

Surviving precincts of the 1814–1815 Cox's Road from Penrith to Bathurst are rare examples of early Colonial road building in NSW. The surviving remnants of Cox's Road have state significance as a rare example of pre 1820 road building based on the use of manual and primitive tools, and predating the more sophisticated road survey and construction techniques employed on the later "Great Roads" of the 1820s and 1830s.

== See also ==
- Cox's Road and Early Deviations – Hartley, Clarence Hilly Range and Mount Blaxland Precinct
- Cox's Road and Early Deviations – Linden, Linden Precinct
- Cox's Road and Early Deviations – Mount York, Cox's Pass Precinct
- Cox's Road and Early Deviations – Sodwalls, Fish River Descent Precinct
- Cox's Road and Early Deviations – Woodford, Old Bathurst Road Precinct
- Convicts in Australia
