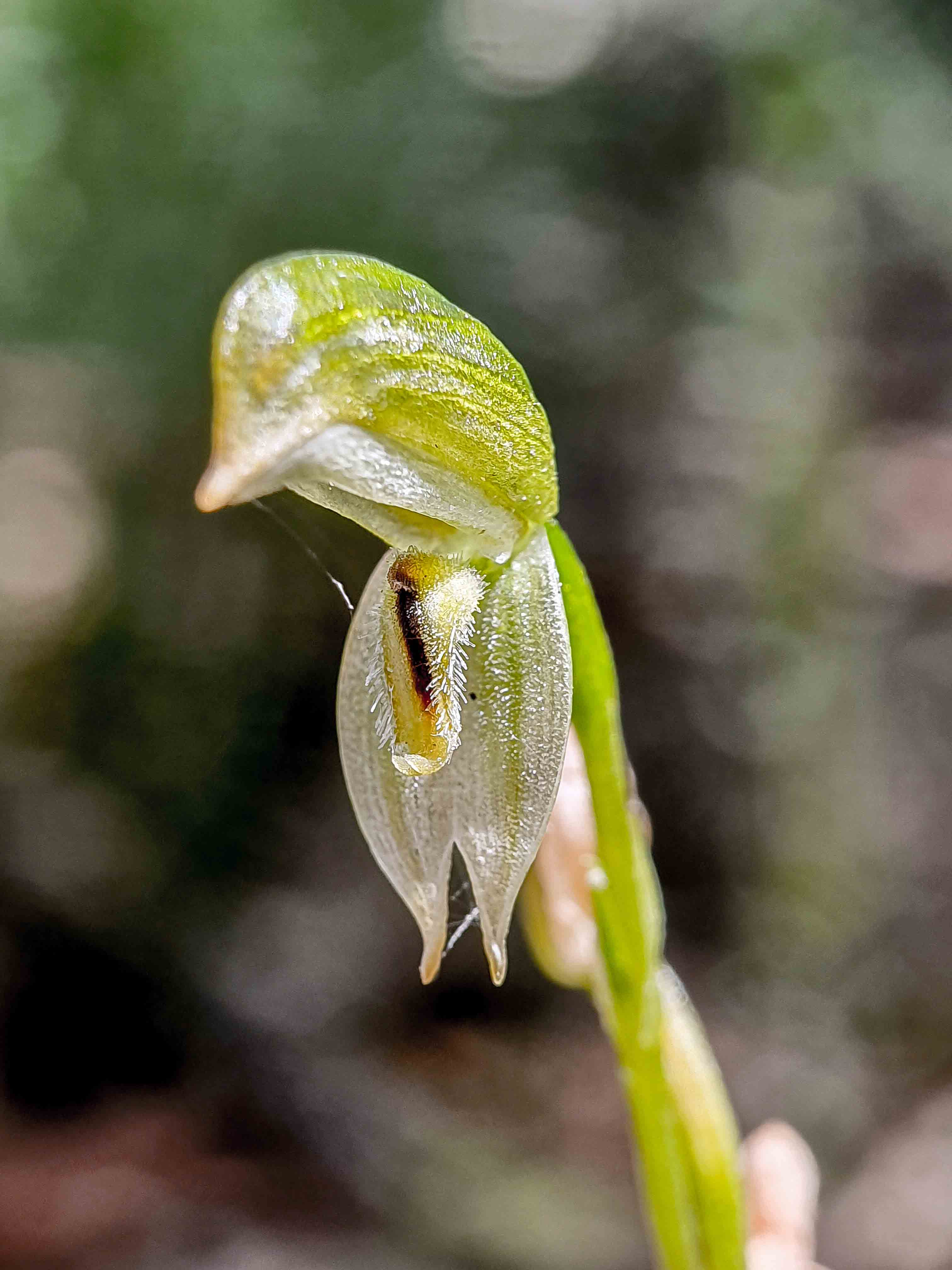
- Near Bells Line of Road

Scientific classification
- Kingdom: Plantae
- Clade: Tracheophytes
- Clade: Angiosperms
- Clade: Monocots
- Order: Asparagales
- Family: Orchidaceae
- Subfamily: Orchidoideae
- Tribe: Cranichideae
- Genus: Pterostylis
- Species: P. lineata

Binomial name
- Pterostylis lineata (D.L.Jones) G.N.Backh.

Synonyms
- Bunochilus lineatus D.L.Jones

= Pterostylis lineata =

Blue Mountains leafy greenhood

Species of orchid

Pterostylis lineata, commonly known as Blue Mountains leafy greenhood, is a plant in the orchid family Orchidaceae and is endemic to New South Wales. As with similar greenhoods, the flowering plants differ from those which are not flowering. The non-flowering plants have a rosette of leaves on a short stalk but the flowering plants lack a rosette and have up to seven dark green flowers with translucent "windows" on a flowering stem with stem leaves. The labellum is light brown with a black strip along its mid-line.

== Description ==
Pterostylis lineata, is a terrestrial, perennial, deciduous, herb with an underground tuber. Non-flowering plants have a rosette of between four and six leaves, each leaf 10–45 mm (0.4–2 in) long and 3–10 mm (0.1–0.4 in) wide on a stalk 20–100 mm (0.8–4 in) high. Flowering plants lack a rosette but have up to seven flowers on a flowering spike 150–400 mm (6–20 in) high with between four and seven stem leaves. The flowers are dark green with transparent sections and 17–20 mm (0.7–0.8 in) long and 5–7 mm (0.2–0.3 in) wide. The dorsal sepal and petals are joined to form a hood called the "galea" over the column. The lateral sepals turn downwards and are 12–13 mm (0.47–0.51 in) long, 5–7 mm (0.2–0.3 in) wide and joined for about half their length. The labellum is 6–7 mm (0.2–0.3 in) long, about 3 mm (0.1 in) wide and light brown with a blackish stripe along its mid-line. Flowering occurs from August to October.

== Taxonomy and naming ==
Blue Mountains leafy greenhood was first formally described in 2006 by David Jones who gave it the name Bunochilus lineatus. The description was published in Australian Orchid Research from a specimen collected near Woodford in the Blue Mountains. In 2010, Gary Backhouse changed the name to Pterostylis lineata. The specific epithet (lineata) is a Latin word meaning "marked with a linear line", referring to the markings on the labellum.

== Distribution and habitat ==
Pterostylis lineata grows in moist soil in wet forest from the western side of the Blue Mountains to Lithgow and on the southern part of the Northern Tablelands.
