= Cox's Road and Early Deviations - Hartley, Clarence Hilly Range and Mount Blaxland Precinct =

Historic road in New South Wales, Australia

Cox's Road and Early Deviations – Hartley, Clarence Hilly Range and Mount Blaxland Precinct
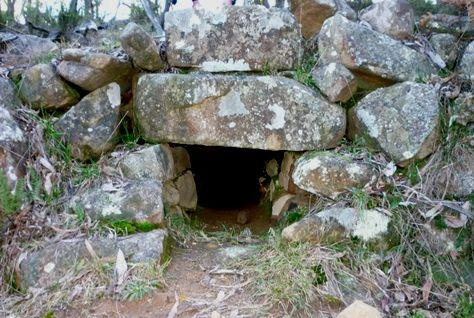
- Mount Blaxland Culvert

- Location within New South Wales Location within Australia
- 33°33′34″S 150°06′03″E
- Location: The Old Bathurst Road, Hartley, City of Lithgow, New South Wales, Australia

History
- Built: 1814–1826

Site notes
- Architect: William Cox

New South Wales Heritage Register
- Official name: Cox's Road and Early Deviations – Hartley, Clarence Hilly Range / Mount Blaxland Precinct; Coxs Road
- Type: State heritage (complex / group)
- Designated: 25 March 2015
- Reference no.: 1957
- Type: Road
- Category: Transport – Land
- Builders: William Cox, Convict Road Party

The Cox's Road and Early Deviations – Hartley, Clarence Hilly Range and Mount Blaxland Precinct is a heritage-listed road at The Old Bathurst Road, Hartley in the City of Lithgow local government area of New South Wales, Australia. It was designed and built by William Cox from 1814 to 1826 with the support of a convict road party. It is also known as Cox's Road and Early Deviations - Hartley, Clarence Hilly Range / Mount Blaxland Precinct and Coxs Road. It was added to the New South Wales State Heritage Register on 25 March 2015.

== History ==
The road from Emu Ford to Bathurst, a distance of 163.3 kilometres (101.5 mi) was completed in only six months during 1814 and 1815 by a working party composed mostly of convicts. Governor Lachlan Macquarie decided to have a carriage road constructed across the Blue Mountains, to the country which had been "newly discovered" by Europeans in 1813.

The ridges and valleys of the Blue Mountains, have been used as a transport corridor by people for tens of thousands of years. In the first 25 years of the settlement at Sydney Cove, several attempts were made to cross the mountains, but none resulted in a recognised successful crossing. Gregory Blaxland, William Lawson and William Charles Wentworth, searching for new pasturage made their famous "first" crossing of the Blue Mountains in 1813. The so-called "First Crossing" took place on the traditional lands of the Dharug, Gundungurra and Wiradjuri people. Other routes through the ridges and valleys of the Blue Mountains had been used by Aboriginal people for tens of thousands of years.

Cox was born in Wimborne Minster, Dorset in 1764. He married Rebecca Upjohn at Clerkenwell, London in 1789. Cox arrived in NSW on board the "Minerva" in January 1800. Cox became Chief Magistrate at Windsor in 1810 and in July 1814 Governor Macquarie made William Cox the Superintendent of the works for a new road over the Blue Mountains. His first wife died in 1819 and Cox married Anna Blachford in 1821. He died on 15 March 1837.

The hill now named Mount Blaxland is situated 11 kilometres (6.8 mi) south-west of Mount York and 8 kilometres (5.0 mi) south of Lithgow. In the published version of his journal, Gregory Blaxland wrote that on 31 May 1813:

'The party encamped by the side of a fine stream of water, at a short distance from a high hill, in the shape of a sugar loaf. In the afternoon, they ascended its summit, from which they descried all around, forest or grass land, sufficient in extent, in their opinion, to support the stock of the Colony for the next thirty years. This was the extreme point of their journey.' From the summit of Mount Blaxland the view westward is actually more confined than this "all around" description suggests, comprising the folds and valleys of the western slopes of the Great Dividing Range. There are, extensive views east over the Hartley Valley to the western side of the Blue Mountains escarpment towards Mount York, Mount Victoria, Mitchells Ridge and Mount Piddington.

Mount Blaxland was named by Surveyor G. W. Evans, sent by Governor Macquarie to confirm the discovery of a passage over the Blue Mountains, in November 1813. Evans also plotted the location of the three sugar loaf shaped hills (Mount Blaxland, Lawson's Sugarloaf and Wentworth's Sugarloaf) on the map he prepared showing the traverse of the route he had followed.

William Cox began to examine a route for the road in the vicinity of Mount Blaxland on 11 December 1814. He commented in his Journal as follows:

Sunday, 11 December: At 6 a.m. sent six men back to the mountain to complete the road. At 7 sent 10 men forward to encamp at Blaxland's Mount under Watson's charge. At 8 set out on horseback, with Mr. Hobby and Lewis (John Tye and a soldier having previously gone) to go as far as the Fish River to examine the ground for a road. After passing Mount Blaxland we ascended a high ridge and found it still continued to ascend until we got extremely high. Continued on until noon and found the ground very unfavourable for a road, when I made up my mind to return by the route Mr. Evans laid down on his chart; but to my great surprise found it impracticable to make a road even for a horse. I therefore returned and examined all the ridges and valleys for several miles and got back at sunset extremely fatigued and much disappointed.

— William Cox's journal, 1814.

A line which climbed a very long, steep and high ridge to the south of Mount Blaxland was selected and road-making commenced under the supervision of Mr Hobby by 13 December 2014. A few days later Cox noted that the road was completed 'except [for] turning some rock out of it after you ascend the hill at Blaxland's Mountain'. The road was finished as far as Jock 's Creek by 17 December and to around Mary Anne Creek by 24 December. Cox's Journal records that ten small bridges were built over creeks between Cox' s River and the Fish River.

During his tour over the newly completed Cox's Road in 1815, Governor Macquarie also described both Mount Blaxland and the road in the vicinity:

Mrs M. and myself mounted our horses at the foot of the first high hill near Mount Blaxland, it being excessively steep and long, for which reason I have named it Fag-Hill. A range of very lofty hills and narrow valleys, alternately form the tract of country lying between Cox's River and the Fish-River, which tract I have named Clarence's Hilly Range in honor of H.R. Highness, William, The Duke of Clarence.

— Gov. Lachlan Macquaire, 1815.

A survey of the route of the Bathurst Road was completed by James McBrien in 1823. McBrien's fieldbook for this survey included a note that the road begins a "descent at the end on [or of?] the highest point of Mount Blaxland".

Over the next few years minor deviations and improvements were made to Cox's Road in this area of hilly country. In 1827 letters describing a journey to Bathurst along Cox's Road were published in the Australian newspaper under the pseudonym "X.Y.Z", probably by Captain William Dumaresq who had been appointed Inspector of Roads and Bridges in 1826. Describing his journey, "X.Y.Z." wrote: The road from Cox's River is good enough, but every quarter of an hour you must dismount, either to walk your horse up or down the hills, which are tremendous and follow one another in rapid succession. Mount Blaxland is long and steep, and the road is taken over the very summit. The view does not repay you for the trouble of ascending, but ascend you must or stop and starve, for it is a desolate and barren place.

By 1829 Major Edmund Lockyer had selected a new line of road to Bathurst which completely abandoned the route via the Clarence Hilly Range and the Fish River. Lockyer's Road was soon superseded by that proposed by Major Thomas Mitchell, who had become Surveyor General in 1828. Mitchell re-surveyed the line of the road between Mount York and Bathurst, preparing a map showing a new line in 1830. This map showed the route of Cox's Road to Bathurst via the Fish River as the "Present Road by Mt Blaxland". Considering he had found a superior route, Mitchell ordered the transfer of the convict gangs from work near Mount York to the Mount Victoria descent in January 1830.

These developments meant that the old Bathurst Road "by Mount Blaxland" was little used, except as access to private properties, which in this area were being occupied from the 1830s.

== Description ==
William Cox had been instructed by Governor Macquarie only to open a rough cart road, so that the new lands found in the western plains would be symbolically open. The road from Emu Ford to Bathurst, a distance of 163 kilometres (101 mi) was completed in only six months. Macquarie's instructions specified that the road should be at least 3.7 metres (12 ft) wide in order that two carts would be able to pass each other, and that the timber should be cleared on each side so that the road corridor was 6.1 metres (20 ft) wide. Stumps were to be grubbed out and any holes should be filled in. The surviving physical evidence shows relatively few locations where the extant road conforms with the dimensions specified in the instructions.

A Crown Road is still reserved and shown on the cadastre in this area running from McKanes Falls Road to the Rydal-Hampton Road. Here the line of Cox's Road becomes more difficult to access as the road itself does not always align with the modern tracks or with what is noted as the "Old Bathurst Road". Therefore, the actual road itself crosses in and out of private property. The physical evidence of the 1814 road where it is present through this area at the beginning of the "Clarence Hilly Range" is also overlaid with later 1820s work, essentially upgrading, re-building and improvement of the older road for at least a decade (most undertaken c. 1825 to 1827) before it was by-passed by the new lines selected by Lockyer in 1829 and by Mitchell in 1830. Both Mount York and the road by Mount Blaxland were avoided by the new road route.

The evidence of road-building in this area includes more than one line, with most of the obvious extant fabric appearing to date from a later era than 1814. The modern unsealed farm track which coincides with the Old Bathurst Road runs some distance north of the line surveyed by McBrien in 1823. Cox's original road in this area likely required little cutting or forming over the easy grades, and therefore did not leave extensive physical evidence. There are remnants of pavement, quantities of cut stone, stone retaining walls of different sophistication and style, a constructed road zig-zag and stone box-culverts, all of which appear to relate to much later 1820s improvements.

The reserved Crown Road diverges from the unsealed farm track and begins to climb to the southwest through more thickly timbered country. Here parts are cut through pink granite and various partly worked stone is lying around with short sections of retaining wall and some early road pavement evident, generally with a width of about 3 metres (9.8 ft). At approximately 750 metres (2,460 ft) from the base of the hill, the road is formed into a substantial zig-zag which extends for 140 metres (460 ft). The zig-zag is supported by carefully constructed retaining walls which commence with a single course of roughly broken stone as edging and then rise steadily to about 2 metres (6 ft 7 in) in height, with some stones squared, many not, but with a relatively smooth face. The bonding is random with the largest stones at the bottom and an even coping course at the top.

The road here also features a packed stone pavement. Various piles of broken or worked stone left over from building operations scattered beside the road formation. There are also some sections of earth-faced cuttings and the road formation increases in width up to 6 or 7 metres (20 or 23 ft) wide. At approximately 30 metres (98 ft) from the end of the wall, a primitive stone box culvert is present, 45 centimetres (18 in) wide and 30 centimetres (12 in) deep, set on walls of two courses of squared stone, with a roughly cut lintel and an earthen floor. On the opposite side is a depression over the inlet area, and section of stone edged side drain is visible. The drain may continue further back down to the zig-zag, but it would need archaeological work to clear and excavate the area to determine this.

Although McBrien's 1823 survey follows the line of this zig-zag, Grace Karskens has argued that comparative archaeological evidence suggests that the stone walls, formation width and pavement were added later as part of improvements to the original Cox's Road. Karskens comments that:

'A very similar section on the Fish River Precinct (No. 16) was not in existence in 1823 – it appears that both sections were built by convict gangs just before and during William Dumaresq's term as Inspector of Roads and Bridges (1826). They were probably not commissioned by him, since he disapproved of the steep slopes and evidently sought to find a new line elsewhere. He did regard it as otherwise a "good enough road" and this, together with a reference to a road party stationed at Fish River, suggests that the improvements were underway or complete on the road. Thus these structures are thought to date from 1825–1826'.

In the vicinity of the "Old Bathurst Road" there are also a number of other road formations which appear to be early diversions and attempted improvements. Usually Cox's Road occupies the top or higher contours of the hillside. Cox's Road is characterised by steep unbroken climbs, narrow width, minimal cuttings and very rough simple retaining walls often using un-worked field stone or very crudely shaped boulders. The later road formations tend to be more curved and more carefully follow the contours or are actually built into the hillside in an attempt to improve the steep gradients of the original road. Further along the Old Bathurst Road there is another section of the c. 1826 walling which extends for almost one kilometre and features stone box culvert in the centre as the road climbs to the summit of the range at a height of more than 1000 metres above sea level. From the summit the line is indistinct, running directly down the grassy slopes of the ridge then passes over a saddle and descending through bushland and then more open and easier rolling countryside.

Cox's Journal also noted that a number of bridges were needed in this area, however, few definite 1814 bridge sites have been located at any of the small creeks crossed by the presently reserved Old Bathurst Road. Remains of an early bridge which had been exposed by recent flooding were previously noted at Mary Anne Creek by Karskens in 1988. That bridge was identified as being pre-1827 and possibly even dating to the first phase of road building. From Mary Anne Creek the road rises uphill again, simply following vehicle tracks to the gate beside the "Karawatha" property which fronts the Rydal-Hampton Road.

The reserved "Old Bathurst Road" then crosses the Rydal-Hampton Road where it becomes a modern local road, called Cut Hill Road. The general alignment and formation of the road is close to that of the original Cox's Road, although it has been straightened in some parts and therefore the old line crosses the modern road at some points. The current sealed modern road has also been re-graded and cut deeper. This section of modern local road is situated further west and it is not included in the Listing for Mount Blaxland Precinct.

The proposed State Heritage Register listing of Cox's Road and Early Deviations includes six precincts of Cox's Road:

- Cox's Road and Early Deviations – Linden, Linden Precinct – HC Plan 2639
- Cox's Road and Early Deviations – Woodford, Old Bathurst Road Precinct – HC Plan 2640
- Cox's Road and Early Deviations – Woodford, Appian Way Precinct – HC Plan 2641
- Cox's Road and Early Deviations – Mount York, Cox's Pass Precinct – HC Plan 2642
- Cox's Road and Early Deviations – Hartley, Clarence Hilly Range / Mount Blaxland Precinct – HC Plan 2643
- Cox's Road and Early Deviations – Sodwalls, Fish River Descent Precinct – HC Plan 2644

=== Condition ===
As at 1 December 2014, the condition of the road was good and substantially intact. Numerous archaeological features from early road lines are evident including road fabric, walling, culverts and road cuttings and formations. There is much physical evidence of various eras of Colonial road present.

=== Modifications and dates ===
- 1820s

== Heritage listing ==
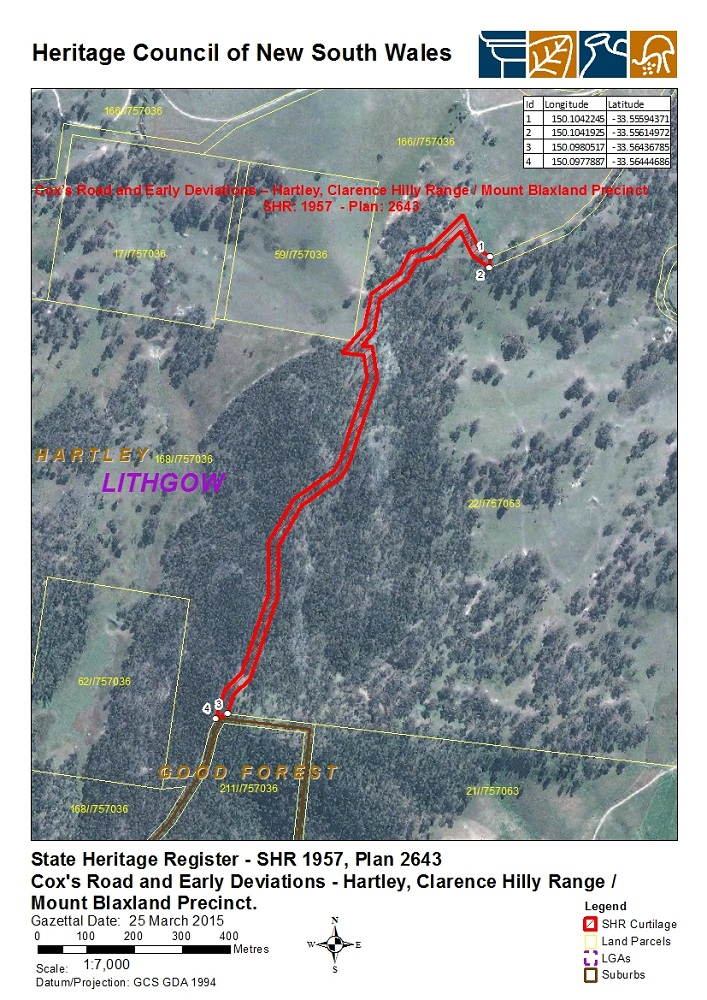
Heritage boundaries show the route of the road

As at 29 January 2015, the surviving remnants of Cox's Road, built 1814 to 1815, have state significance as the earliest road across the Blue Mountains and the first structure built by Europeans west of the Blue Mountains. Building of this road followed from the prior exploration by Gregory Blaxland, William Lawson and William Wentworth, and the survey by George Evans. The successful construction of the road was symbolic of the conquest of the natural barrier created by the Blue Mountains, and represented Governor Macquarie's vision for the ongoing development of the colony beyond Sydney and its immediate surrounds. Cox's Road enabled the later opening of the hinterland beyond the Blue Mountains for subsequent settlement, pastoral and agricultural expansion, which then escalated the dispossession of Aboriginal peoples from their lands.

William Cox was well known among convicts for his power to recommend pardons and tickets of leave. Most of the convicts who volunteered for the work to open a track to the interior were emancipated, receiving pardons or Tickets of Leave on completion of the work.

The surviving road fabric demonstrates the crude and hurried nature of Cox's work, and the techniques used in tracing, cutting and forming the road. In conjunction with later colonial road alignments on the mountains and elsewhere, Cox's Road also forms part of a suite of roads demonstrating the wide range of road building styles and standards employed during the colonial period.

Cox's Road and Early Deviations – Hartley, Clarence Hilly Range and Mount Blaxland Precinct was listed on the New South Wales State Heritage Register on 25 March 2015 having satisfied the following criteria.

The place is important in demonstrating the course, or pattern, of cultural or natural history in New South Wales.

Surviving remnants of Cox's Road have state historical significance as physical evidence of the first road constructed across the Blue Mountains from Emu Plains to the Bathurst Plains (1814–15). Constructed in 1814–15 Cox's Road is one of the earliest Colonial-era road-lines surviving in Australia. The 1814–15 road is tangible evidence of the development of the colony at Sydney and of the expansion of white settlement into western NSW. The road symbolises the occupation of the country and Governor Macquarie's aspirations for the eventual opening of the interior to European settlement after the discovery of the Western plains by G. W. Evans in 1814. In this respect the 1814–1815 Cox's Road has considerable symbolic significance as an official public work which laid the foundations for future development. Cox's Road is linked with the foundation of Bathurst, the first inland settlement in NSW, which was proclaimed by Governor Macquarie on 7 May 1815 after his journey along the road.

The place has a strong or special association with a person, or group of persons, of importance of cultural or natural history of New South Wales's history.

The surviving remnants of Cox's Road have state significance for their close association with Governor Lachlan Macquarie who commissioned the building of the road into the interior, and with the magistrate and ex-army officer Captain William Cox, who supervised the building of the road. The road is also associated with the convicts who laboured on the road to obtain their liberty, and with the officers and men who assisted Cox such as Thomas Hobby, Richard Lewis, John Tighe and Samuel Ayres. The crossing of the Blue Mountains, the surveying of a route to Bathurst and the building of Cox's Road were significant events in the period of Macquarie's governorship. Governor Macquarie's view of the importance of the road is demonstrated by his reports to Earl Bathurst, the British Secretary of State for War and the Colonies, and by his journey to the Bathurst Plains immediately after its construction, where he proclaimed the site for the Bathurst township.

William Cox's achievement using a small group of convict men in a short period of time and with no loss of life caused by road-making or other substantial difficulties, was reflective of his reputation as a more humane employer and magistrate than many of his contemporaries. The leadership qualities, vision and skill he showed constructing the road would also be evident in later government contracts won by Cox for other public works.

The place is important in demonstrating aesthetic characteristics and/or a high degree of creative or technical achievement in New South Wales.

The surviving precincts of Cox's Road have state technical significance for their ability to demonstrate simple, pre 1820s road building techniques. Improvement of the 1814 route throughout the 1820s also provide important evidence of later road building techniques and demonstrates the ongoing use of this key route to the interior, before it was superseded by the new Great Western Road laid out by Sir Thomas Mitchell in the 1830s.

The Mount Blaxland – Clarence Hilly Range Precinct illustrates Cox's 1814–15 road and the way it was modified through the 1820s to service increasing traffic, until it became superseded by new road lines after 1830. It is possible to discern and demonstrate the difference between Cox 's first rough track and the c. 1825–26 improvements to the alignment, gradient, width and stability of the road.

The Mount Blaxland – Clarence Hilly Range Precinct has considerable archaeological potential as remains of a very early bridge (1815–1827) were previously identified at Mary Anne Creek, and numerous other potential bridge sites exist through this precinct. It is also likely that further archaeological work to excavate and clear key parts of the road formations in this precinct may reveal more detail regarding the early structures and construction features such as currently silted up or buried side-drains.

The place has a strong or special association with a particular community or cultural group in New South Wales for social, cultural or spiritual reasons.

Cox's Road and its remnants are demonstrated as having social significance at a state level by the substantial interest in identifying and promoting Cox's Road for cultural tourism and education, and celebrating the bicentenary of the road by the general public, state and local government bodies and a range of community organisations. The road is of particular importance to Cox descendants. The William Cox Fellowship first nominated sections of Cox's Road for heritage listing in the 1980s.

The place has potential to yield information that will contribute to an understanding of the cultural or natural history of New South Wales.

Precincts of Cox's Road have research significance at a state level for their ability to demonstrate early nineteenth century road, culvert and bridge building techniques using basic skills and technologies. The remains of the 1814–15 road illustrate the conditions of the period and contribute to an understanding of the process of exploration and development, and of early colonial road building and road use. The remains represent a major physical, technological and engineering achievement and exhibit fine details of workmanship. Several precincts of the 1814–15 road have specific archaeological potential.

The place possesses uncommon, rare or endangered aspects of the cultural or natural history of New South Wales.

Surviving precincts of the 1814–1815 Cox's Road from Penrith to Bathurst are rare examples of early Colonial road building in NSW. The surviving remnants of Cox's Road have state significance as a rare example of pre 1820 road building based on the use of manual and primitive tools, and predating the more sophisticated road survey and construction techniques employed on the later "Great Roads" of the 1820s and 1830s.

== See also ==
- Cox's Road and Early Deviations – Linden, Linden Precinct
- Cox's Road and Early Deviations – Mount York, Cox's Pass Precinct
- Cox's Road and Early Deviations – Sodwalls, Fish River Descent Precinct
- Cox's Road and Early Deviations – Woodford, Appian Way Precinct
- Cox's Road and Early Deviations – Woodford, Old Bathurst Road Precinct
- Convicts in Australia
