= William Cox (pioneer) =

English soldier and early Australian pioneer

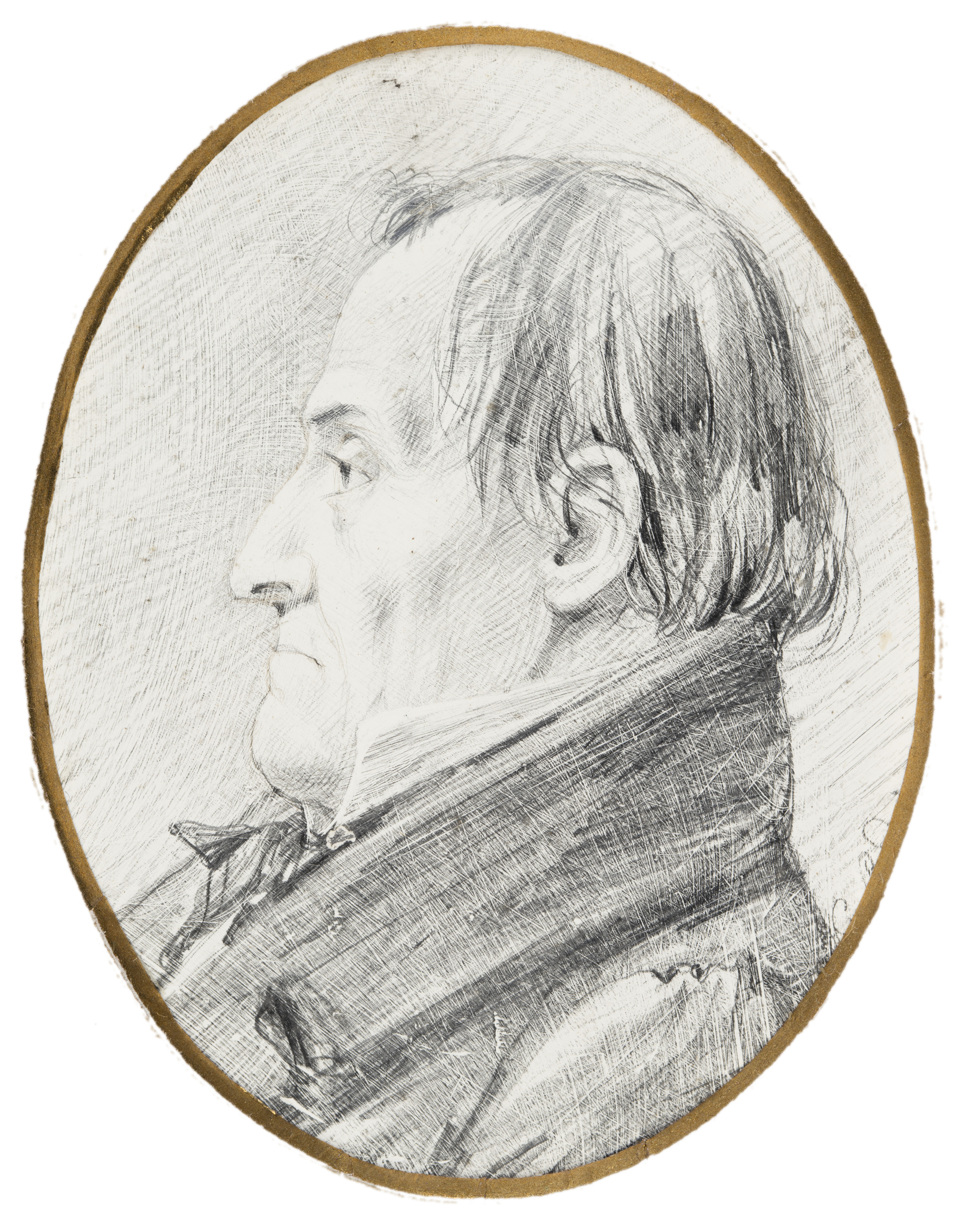
- Portrait of William Cox, 1830, by Charles Rodius
- Born: 19 December 1764; Wimborne, Dorset, England
- Died: 15 March 1837 (aged 72); Windsor, Colony of New South Wales
- Burial place: St Matthew's Church, Windsor
- Monuments: Cox's Road; Stained glass window in St Andrew's Cathedral; The Mount York Obelisk
- Education: Queen Elizabeth's Grammar School
- Occupations: Soldier; explorer; engineer; pioneer
- Known for: Construction of a navigable passage and road over the Blue Mountains
- Spouses: Rebecca Upjohn (m. 1789; dec'd. 1819); Anna Blachford (m. 1821)
- Parents: William Cox (father); Jane Reeks (mother)
- Military career
- Allegiance: United Kingdom
- Branch: British Army
- Service years: 1795 – c. 1807
- Rank: First lieutenant
- Units: 117th Regiment of Foot (1795–96); 68th (Durham) Regiment of Foot (1796–97); New South Wales Corps (1797-c. 1807)

William Cox (19 December 1764 – 15 March 1837) was an English soldier, known as an explorer, road builder and pioneer in the early period of British settlement of Australia.

== Early life ==
Cox was born in Wimborne Minster, Dorset, son of William Cox and Jane Harvey, and was educated at Queen Elizabeth's Grammar School in the town. He married Rebecca Upjohn in 1789.

== Military career ==
Cox had served in the Wiltshire militia before being commissioned as ensign (without purchase) in the 117th Regiment of Foot on 11 July 1795, transferring on 23 January 1796 to the 68th (Durham) Regiment of Foot. He was promoted to lieutenant in the 68th Foot on 21 February 1797. He transferred to the New South Wales Corps on 30 September 1797, having changed places with a certain Lieutenant Beckwith, and was made paymaster on 23 June 1798.

Cox sailed for New South Wales on 24 August 1799 on the Minerva, with his wife and four sons. Aboard the ship were around 160 convicts, including Joseph Holt and Henry Fulton who were among many political prisoners.

The Minerva arrived in Sydney on 11 January 1800. Cox purchased a 100-acre (40 ha) farm and made Holt its manager. Further land was purchased but in 1803 large liabilities led to Cox's estate being placed into the hands of trustees. He was suspended from office due to allegations that regimental accounts were involved. Cox returned to England in 1807 to answer allegations that he had misused army funds. The Dictionary of Australian Biography records that Cox was cleared in 1808, and was promoted to Captain of 102nd Regiment of Foot, and placed in charge of Irish political prisoners. However, the London Gazette of 19 April 1808 records, "Paymaster William Cox, of the New South Wales Corps, is dismissed the Service."

== Building career ==
In 1811 Cox returned to Australia. Once back there, he resigned his commission and became principal magistrate at Hawkesbury. He was also responsible for erecting many government buildings.

In 1814, Governor Lachlan Macquarie approved Cox's 'voluntary offer of your superintending and directing the working party' that would build a road crossing the Blue Mountains, between Sydney and Bathurst. The completed dirt track was 12 feet (3.7 m) wide by 101 1/2 miles (163.3 km) long, built between 18 July 1814 to 14 January 1815 using five free men, 30 convict labourers and eight soldiers.

Macquarie surveyed the finished road in April 1815 by driving his carriage along it from Sydney to Bathurst. He commended Cox and stated that the project would have taken three years if it had been done under a contract. As a reward Cox was awarded 2,000 acres (810 ha) of land near Bathurst. The road became known as Cox's Road and over time much of it has been bypassed in favour of easier grades.

== Treatment of Aboriginal People ==
As landowner, magistrate and commander of the Windsor Garrison, William Cox organised punitive & dispersive expeditions from July 1816 along the Nepean–Hawkesbury River in which he 'reported' the killings of four Aboriginal men. Unlike the military offensive of April of that year that resulted in the Appin Massacre, the events of these raids and killings were barely recorded. In response to ongoing Aboriginal resistance to settlers, Cox had sent Governor Lachlan Macquarie a grim manifesto for a final showdown on the Hawkesbury-Nepean. Whatever 'Friendship or good faith' existed between Aboriginal people and settlers, he declared, it did not protect settlers from 'Revenge and Murder whenever the former are Insulted or think themselves aggrieved by any White people.' Five punitive parties were to comb the country repeatedly - the period was unspecified. Three detachments of soldiers, each with a constable who knew the area, and a 'friendly native' as a guide, were to be posted at the Grose River, Windsor and downriver at Portland Head respectively. Young native-born men were also involved in these parties. Cox wanted the Aboriginal people to understand that, until the wanted men were captured or dead, 'no peace will be given them.' Cox's raids were eventually effective. On 1 November 1816 Macquarie published another grand proclamation announcing that hostilities had ceased. Silence then descended upon the Hawkesbury, effectively ending its frontier war.

At a public meeting in Bathurst in 1824 in response to frontier hostility on the other side of the Great Dividing Range where Cox had been given further large land grants by Macquarie, Cox is recorded as saying:

"The best thing that can be done is to shoot all the blacks and manure the ground with their carcasses. That is all they are fit for. It is also recommended that all the women and children be shot. That is the most certain way of getting rid of this pestilent race"

== Family ==
Rebecca Cox died in 1819, having borne five sons. In 1821, Cox married Anna Blachford, by whom he had another three sons and a daughter. Their son Alfred Cox was a large landholder in New Zealand and a member of the House of Representatives. Another son, Edward Cox, was a pastoralist who served on the New South Wales Legislative Council.

The BBC One television programme Who Do You Think You Are?, which aired on 30 August 2010, traced the ancestry of Australian soap and pop star Jason Donovan through his mother Sue Menlove's side of the family back to William Cox.

== See also ==
- Cox's Road and Early Deviations - Linden, Linden Precinct
- Cox's Road and Early Deviations - Woodford, Old Bathurst Road Precinct
- Cox's Road and Early Deviations - Woodford, Appian Way Precinct
- Cox's Road and Early Deviations - Mount York, Cox's Pass Precinct
- Cox's Road and Early Deviations - Hartley, Clarence Hilly Range and Mount Blaxland Precinct
- Cox's Road and Early Deviations - Sodwalls, Fish River Descent Precinct
