= Fire trail =

Road built for access by firefighters

A fire trail is a rural road built specifically for the purpose of access for "fire management purposes" including building containment lines and backburning operations.

The term is part of the vocabulary of Australian bushfire control and may also sometimes be known as a fireroad in US terminology. A fire trail may act as part of a control line or fire break, but a fire trail in itself does not constitute a fire break. In California, where "fire trail" is the preferred term, it frequently refers to the unpaved roads built for wildfire control on undeveloped urban hills and foothills rather than those in rural regions.

Local residents have been known to use fire trails for a range of recreational purposes, including hiking, cycling, and horse riding, where access is permitted. On shared-use fire trails, etiquette generally requires cyclists and walkers to give way to horse riders, and cyclists to give way to walkers.

As fire trails provide access to otherwise remote areas, they suffer from adverse effects including: erosion, noise pollution, weed invasion, stuck vehicles, and illegal activities like dumping.

As the fire trails are unpaved, contour banks are essential to control erosion and track degradation.

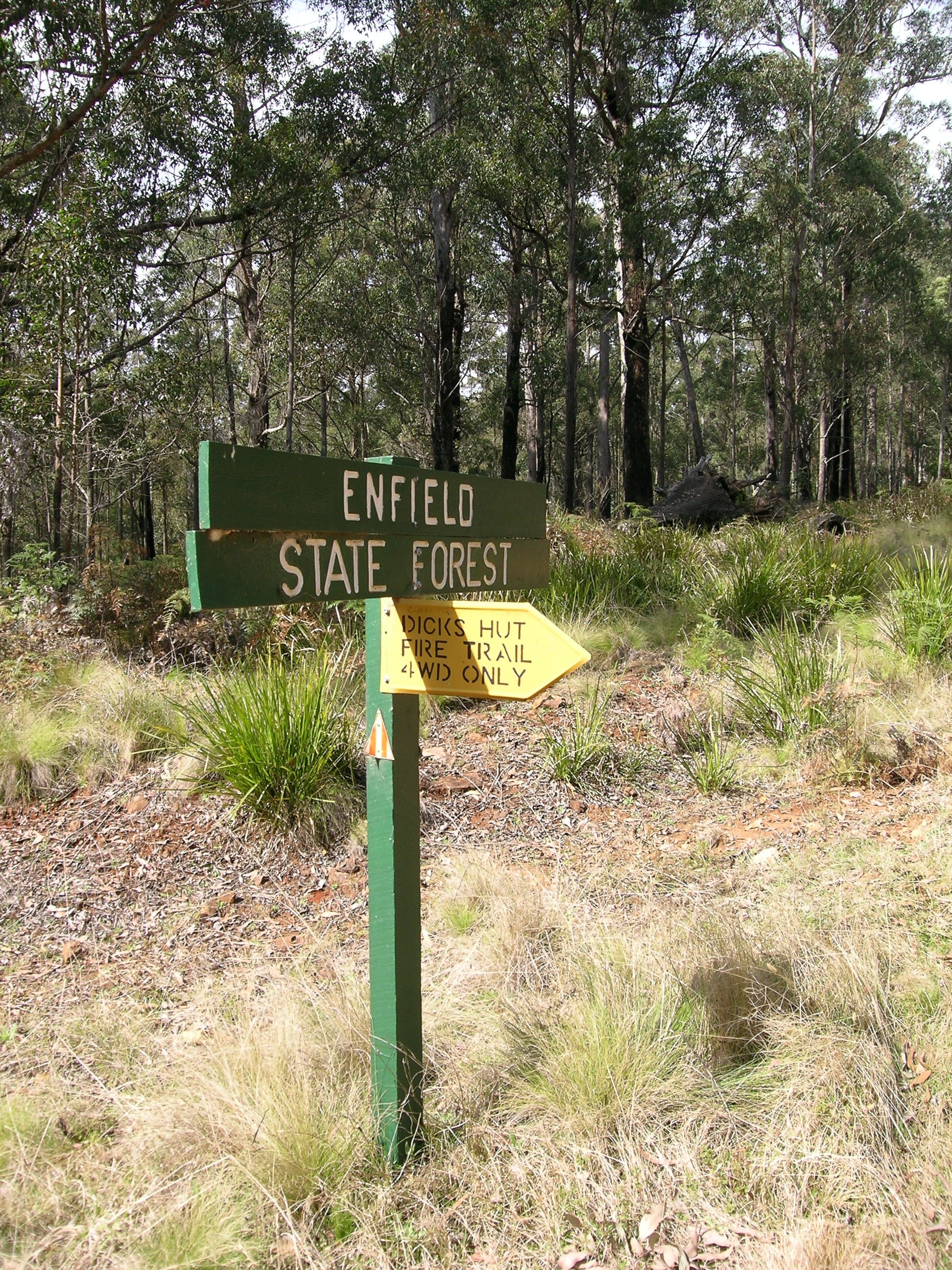
A fire trail sign in Enfield State Forest.
