= Woodford, New South Wales =

Woodford
- Town
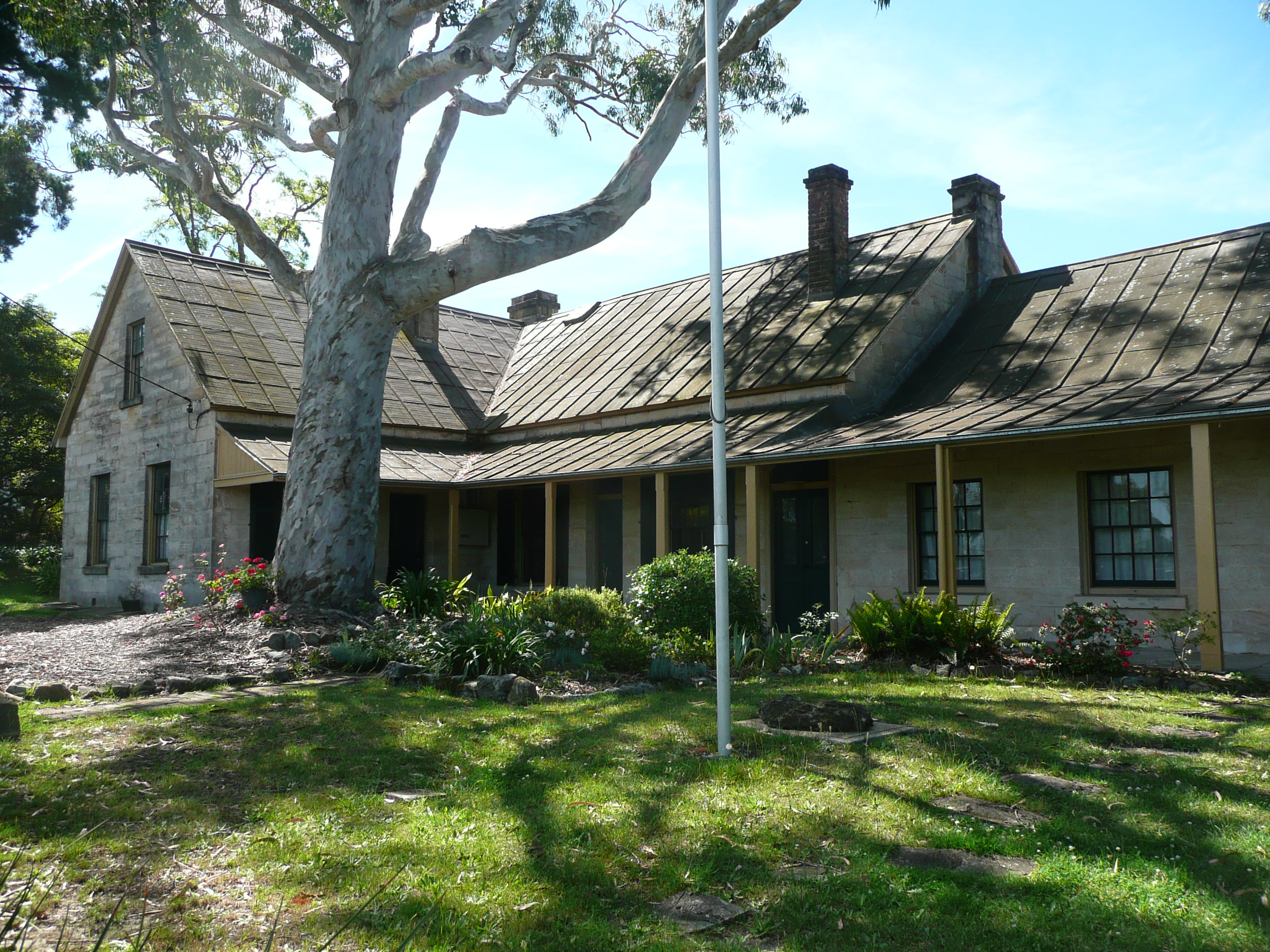
- Woodford Academy

- Interactive map of Woodford
- Coordinates: 33°44′08″S 150°28′42″E
- Country: Australia
- State: New South Wales
- City: Blue Mountains
- LGA: City of Blue Mountains
- Location: 87 km (54 mi) from Sydney CBD; 19 km (12 mi) from Katoomba
- Established: c. 1830s

Government
  - State electorate: Blue Mountains
  - Federal division: Macquarie
- Elevation: 609 m (1,998 ft)

Population
  - Total: 1,953 (2021 census)
- Postcode: 2778
Localities around Woodford
Hazelbrook	Blue Mountains National Park	Linden
Hazelbrook	Woodford	Linden

View from Woodford Station

Woodford is a village in the Blue Mountains in New South Wales, Australia, about 90 kilometres west of the Sydney CBD. Its elevation is 609 metres (1,998 ft) above sea level. It is situated on the Great Western Highway and has a railway station (opened in 1868 as Buss's Platform) on the Main Western railway line served by NSW TrainLink's Blue Mountains services. At the 2021 census, Woodford had a population of 1,953.

== History and description ==
The site was originally known as Twenty Mile Hollow. In the 1830s an inn called The Woodman was built there. Ten years later the inn became known as the King's Arms, later popularly known as Buss's Inn after 1855. Sydney businessman Alfred Fairfax converted the building into a private home some time later and renamed it Woodford House. The railway station adopted the name Woodford in 1871. Woodford House later became a private boys' school and is now a heritage-listed building.

Woodford actively developed public spaces, with efforts in the early 20th century, particularly around 1918-1919, to establish parks and reserves, creating Woodford Park from a railway reserve.

A centenary time capsule was buried at Woodford railway station on 14 December 2002 by Chris Parr, Woodford's station master at the time. He collected items from the locals which went into the capsule to be opened in a hundred years.

== Heritage listings ==
Woodford has a number of heritage-listed sites, including:

- 90–92 Great Western Highway: Woodford Academy
- Old Bathurst Road: Cox's Road and Early Deviations – Woodford, Old Bathurst Road Precinct
- The Appian Way (off): Cox's Road and Early Deviations – Woodford, Appian Way Precinct

== Sports ==
Woodford is well known to mountain bike riders and walkers as the start point for the renowned Oaks and St Helena tracks. It is also the finish point for Andersons and Ingar fire trails, also popular with mountain bike riders and walkers. Each June or July, CareFlight raises money by conducting the Woodford to Glenbrook Classic, a cycling and running race from Woodford railway station to Euroka picnic area at Glenbrook in the Blue Mountains National Park. The Classic follows the Oaks and Bennetts Ridge fire trails, and is 25 km in length.

== Tourism ==
The area also presents opportunities for bushwalking and photography in places like Murphys Glen and Wilson Glen (on the south side) and Mabel Falls Reserve (on the north side).

Mural at Woodford Station

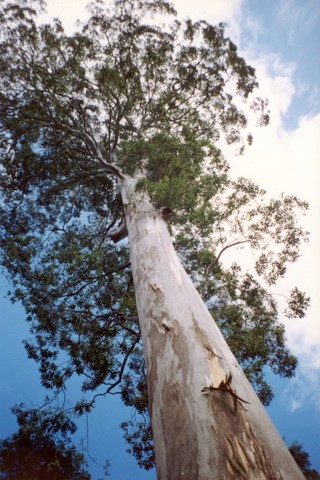
Giant Mountain Blue Gum near Woodford, over 70 metres tall

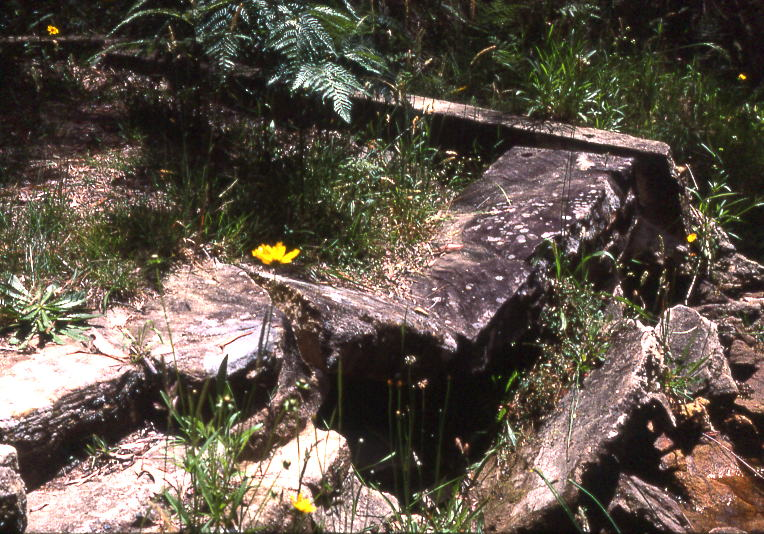
Ruins at Gypsy Pool, Wilson Glen
