= Linden, New South Wales =

Linden
- Suburb
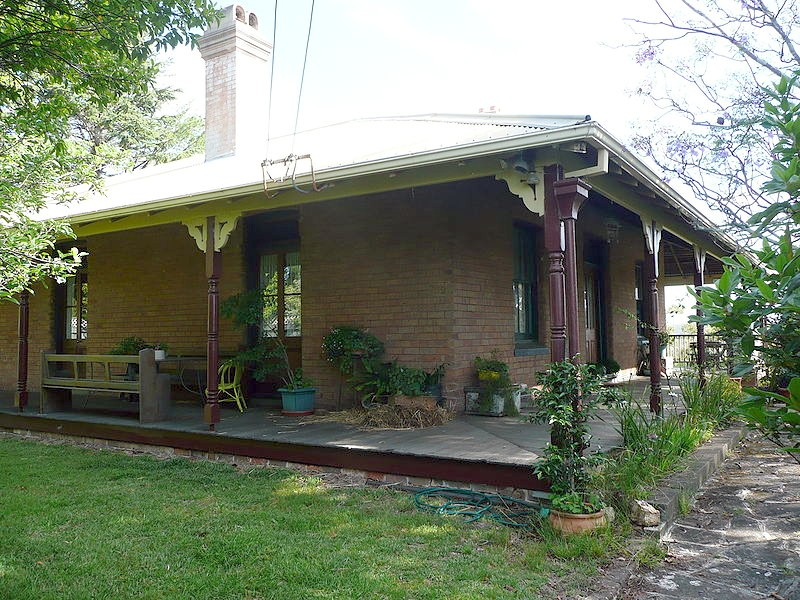
- Linden Lodge (1865)

- Interactive map of Linden
- Coordinates: 33°42′56″S 150°29′46″E
- Country: Australia
- State: New South Wales
- City: Blue Mountains
- LGA: City of Blue Mountains
- Location: 82 km (51 mi) W of Sydney CBD; 23 km (14 mi) E of Katoomba

Government
  - State electorate: Blue Mountains
  - Federal division: Macquarie
- Elevation: 526 m (1,726 ft)

Population
  - Total: 471 (2021 census)
- Postcode: 2778
Suburbs around Linden
Blue Mountains National Park		Faulconbridge
Woodford	Linden
	Blue Mountains National Park

Linden is a village in the Blue Mountains of New South Wales, Australia. It is in the City of Blue Mountains, 82 km west of Sydney and 23 km east of Katoomba. The village is on the Great Western Highway and has a railway station on the Main Western railway line served by NSW TrainLink's Blue Mountains Line. It shares a post office, and therefore the 2778 postcode, with adjoining Woodford. In the 2021 census, its population was 471, including 16 indigenous people (3.2%).

== Description and history ==
The railway station at Linden was built in 1874 and was named after Linden Lodge, the home built in 1865 by local businessman William Jolley Henderson. Linden was originally known as Seventeen Mile Hollow because of its location 17 miles (27.35 km) from the Nepean River. It was originally the location of a tollhouse erected in 1849 and demolished in the 1860s during the construction of the railway.

The village is near the grave of John Donohoe, a road-gang convict who died on 25 June 1837. It is also near Caley's Repulse, a mound of rocks in the shape of a pyramid that was believed to have been constructed by Aborigines. However, some sources maintain that this is a fallacy and that the pile of rocks actually date back to 1912, when a group from the Royal Australian Historical Society made a pile of rocks in the wrong place. Other nearby attractions include King's Cave and Linden Observatory.

Linden Creek, which carves a deep valley on the north side of Linden, is a major tributary of the Grose River.

== Transport ==
Blue Mountains Transit operates two bus routes via Linden:

- 685H: Springwood to North Hazelbrook
- 690K: Springwood to Katoomba

== Heritage listings ==
Linden has a number of heritage-listed sites, including:

- Blue Mountains National Park: Blue Mountains walking tracks
- 91–111 Glossop Road: Linden Observatory Complex
- off Railway Parade: Cox's Road and Early Deviations – Linden, Linden Precinct

== Gallery ==
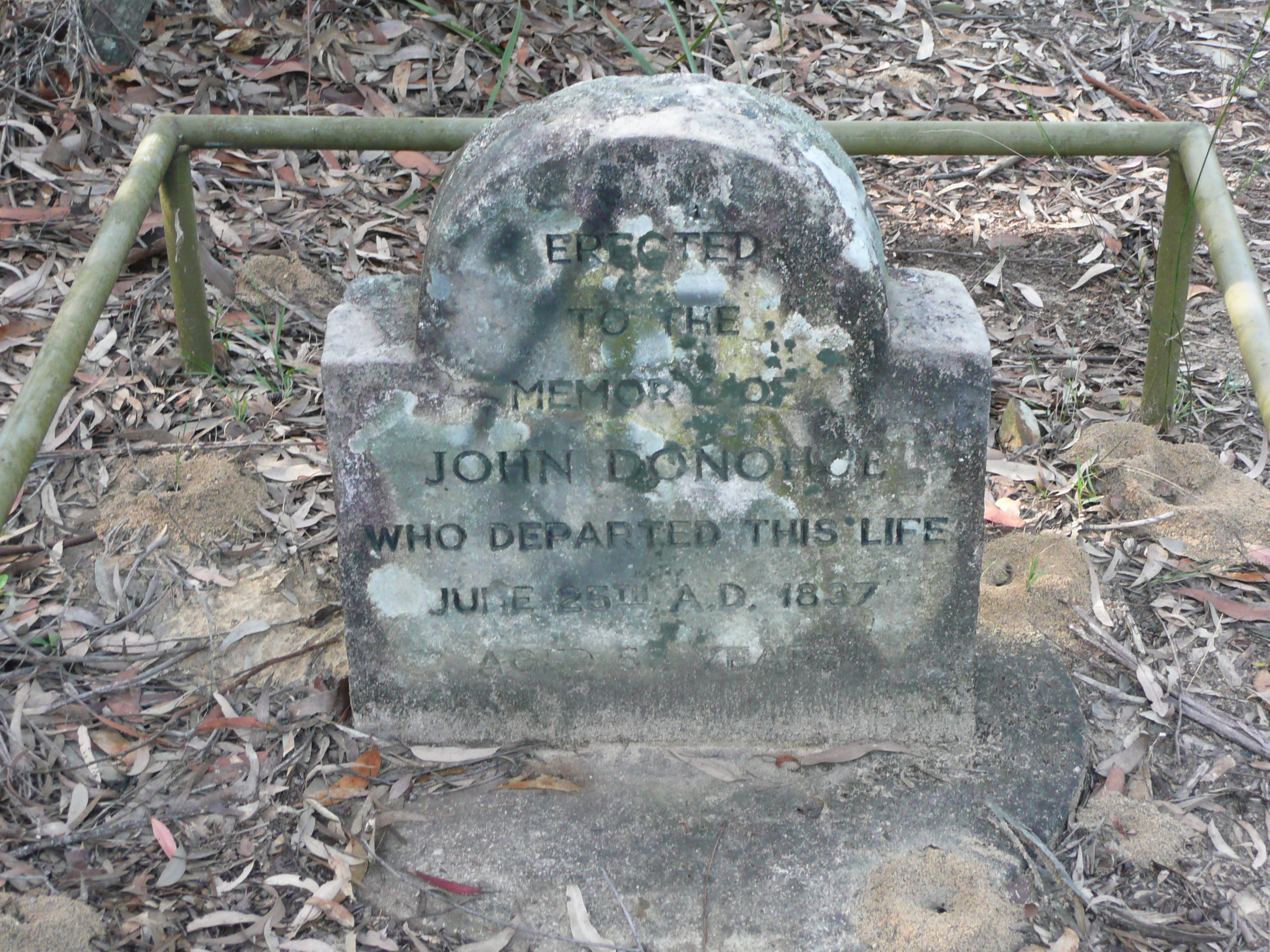
Donohoe's Grave

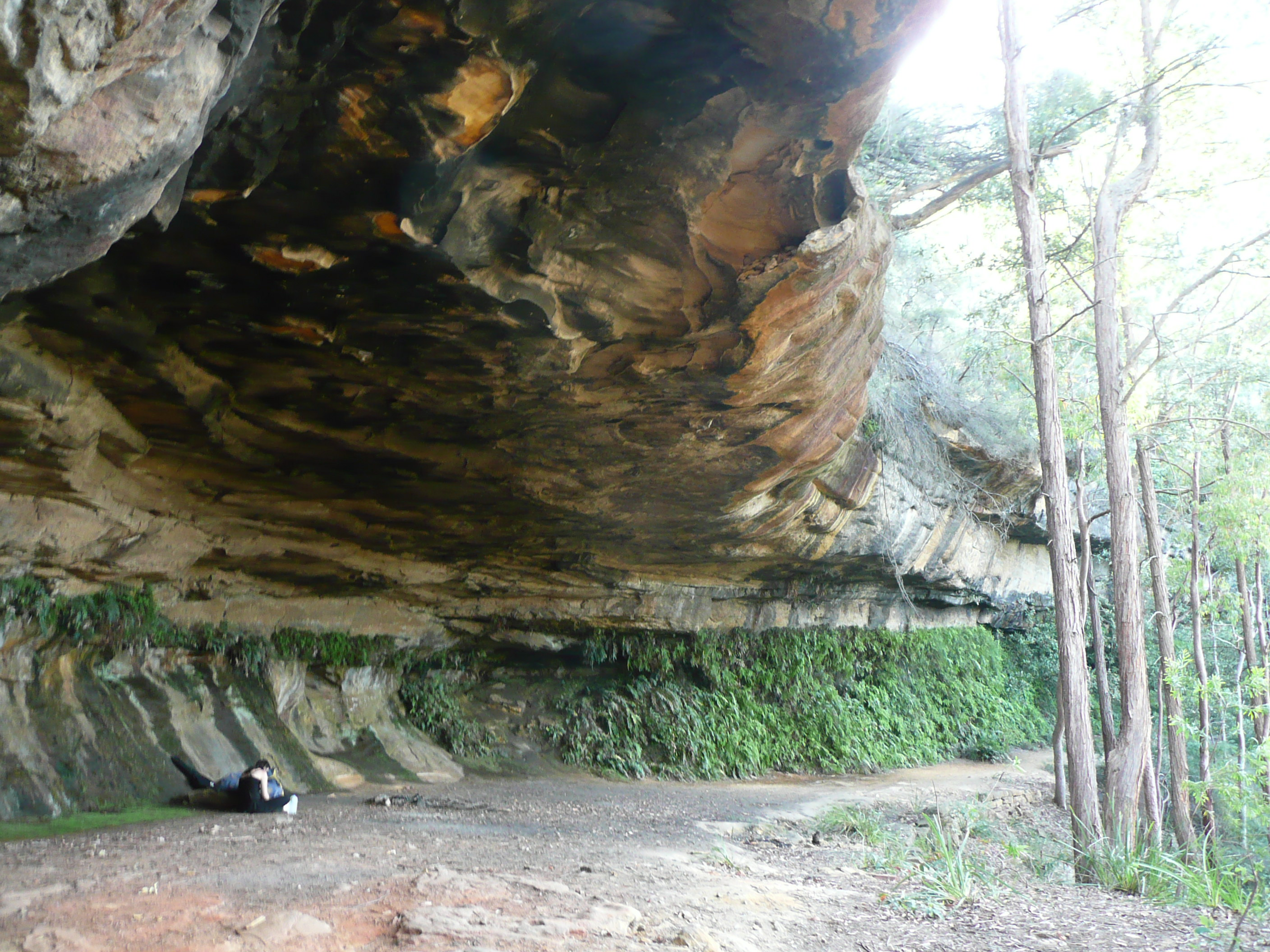
Kings Cave
