= City of Lithgow =

- Local government area
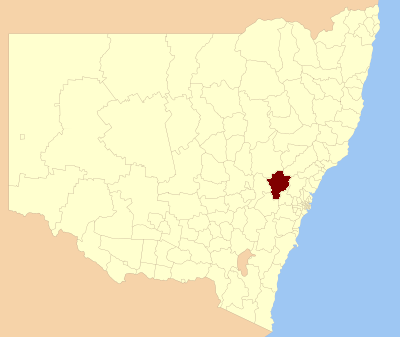
- Location in New South Wales

- Interactive map of City of Lithgow
- Coordinates: 33°29′S 150°09′E
- Country: Australia
- State: New South Wales
- Region: Central West
- Council seat: Lithgow

Government
  - Mayor: Maree Statham (Unaligned)
  - State electorate: Bathurst
  - Federal divisions: Calare; Macquarie

Area
  - Total: 4,551 km^{2} (1,757 sq mi)

Population
  - Totals: 20,842 (2021 census); 21,636 (2018 est.)
  - Density: 4.5797/km^{2} (11.8612/sq mi)
- Website: City of Lithgow
LGAs around City of Lithgow
Mid-Western	Singleton	Hawkesbury
Bathurst	City of Lithgow	Blue Mountains
Oberon	Oberon	Wollondilly

The City of Lithgow is a local government area in the Central West region of New South Wales, Australia. The area is located adjacent to the Great Western Highway and the Main Western railway line.

The mayor of the City of Lithgow Council is Maree Statham, who is unaligned with any political party.

== Main towns and villages ==
The council seat is located in the city of Lithgow, the largest regional centre. The area also includes the towns and villages of Bell, Ben Bullen, Bogee, Bowenfels, Capertee, Clarence, Cullen Bullen, Dargan, Glen Alice, Glen Davis, Hampton, Hartley, Hartley Vale, Little Hartley, Marrangaroo, Meadow Flat, Newnes, Portland, Rydal, Sodwalls, Tarana, and Wallerawang.

== Demographics ==
According to the Australian Bureau of Statistics on 2006 census night there were:

- 21,157 people living in the area, making the City the 77th largest Local Government Area in New South Wales. It was equal to 0.3% of the New South Wales population of 6,827,694
- 116 more people living in the area than the previous period, giving the City the 82nd largest population growth in a Local Government Area in New South Wales. It was equal to 0.2% of the 58,753 increase in the population of New South Wales
- in percentage terms, an increase of 0.6% in the number of people over the year, the 92nd fastest growth in population of a Local Government Area in New South Wales. In New South Wales the population grew by 0.9%
- was an increase in population over the 10 years of 733 people or 3.6% (0.4% in annual average terms), the 81st highest rate of a Local Government Area in New South Wales. In New South Wales the population grew by 622,966 or 10% (1.0% in annual average terms) over the same period.

== Council ==
=== Current composition and election method ===
Lithgow City Council is composed of nine councillors elected proportionally as a single ward. All councillors are elected for a fixed four-year term of office. The mayor is elected by the councillors at the first meeting of the council. The most recent election was held on 4 December 2021.

Party	Councillors
Independent and Unaligned	9
Total	9

== Election results ==
=== 2024 ===
2024 New South Wales local elections: Lithgow
Party	Candidate	Votes	%	±%
Independent	1. Martin Ticehurst (elected 1); 2. Elizabeth Fredericks (elected 8); 3. Ian Wamijo; 4. Greg Noble; 5. Rod Gurney	2,812	21.6	
Independent	1. Eric Mahony (elected 2); 2. Ray Smith (elected 6); 3. Dennis Limbert; 4. Diane Plaza; 5. Lucille Hoy	2,214	17.0	
Independent	1. Darryl Goodwin (elected 4); 2. Josh Howarth; 3. Johan Nilsson; 4. Greg Peveril-Guest; 5. Charlie Healey; 6. Melanie Palmer	1,901	14.6	−4.5
Independent	1. Cass Coleman (elected 3); 2. Jon Cronin; 3. Tenille Evans; 4. Kylie Holmes; 5. Mark McAuley	1,833	14.1	−2.4
Independent	1. Maree Statham (elected 5); 2. Col O'Connor; 3. Stuart McGhie; 4. Almudena Bryce; 5. Dianne O'Sullivan; 6. Catherine Rookyard; 7. David Adams	1,667	12.8	−29.3
Independent	1. Steven Ring (elected 7); 2. Matthew Conlon; 3. Natalie Foodey; 4. Louis Sander; 5. Michael Koleda	923	7.1	+2.2
Independent	1. Tommy Evangelidis (elected 9); 2. Macgregor Ross; 3. Marilyn Boundy; 4. Jacob Bray; 5. Karen Seita	719	5.5	
Independent	Stephen Lesslie	396	3.0	−4.5
Independent	1. Kyle Rollinson; 2. Matthew Palmer; 3. Scott Davies; 4. Daniel Mortell; 5. Samual Palmer	327	2.5	
Independent	Ann Thompson	159	1.2	
Independent	Will Hanby	67	0.5	
Total formal votes		13,018	93.8	
Informal votes		856	6.2	
Turnout		13,874	87.3	

=== 2021 ===
Elected councillor	Party
Maree Stratham	Team Maree
Col O'Connor	Team Maree
Stuart McGhie	Team Maree
Almudena Bryce	Team Maree
Darryl Goodwin	Good for Council
Deanna Goodsell	Good for Council
Cass Coleman	Cass Coleman
Eric Mahony	Cass Coleman
Stephen Lesslie	Independent

2021 New South Wales local elections: Lithgow
Party	Candidate	Votes	%	±%
	Team Maree	5,502	42.1	
	Good for Council	2,496	19.1	
	Cass Coleman Community Team	2,147	16.4	
	Independent	1,665	12.7	
	Ring's Independent Lithgow	633	4.8	
	Lithgow First	618	4.7	
Total formal votes		13,061	95.4	
Informal votes		636	4.6	
Turnout		13,697	86.4	

== Heritage listings ==
The City of Lithgow has a number of heritage-listed sites, including:

- Ben Bullen, Wallerawang-Gwabegar railway: Ben Bullen railway station
- Bowenfels, Great Western Highway: Fernhill, Bowenfels
- Bowenfels, via Kirkley Street: Lithgow Heavy Anti Aircraft Gun Stations and Dummy Station
- Bowenfels, Main Western railway: Bowenfels railway station
- Bowenfels, Main Western railway: Bowenfels rail viaducts
- Hartley, Great Western Highway: Hartley historic site
- Hartley, 200 Jenolan Caves Road: Military Station archaeological site
- Hartley, The Old Bathurst Road: Cox's Road and Early Deviations - Hartley, Clarence Hilly Range and Mount Blaxland Precinct
- Hartley Vale, Hartley Vale Road: Collits' Inn
- Lithgow, Bent Street: Lithgow Valley Colliery and Pottery Site
- Lithgow, Brewery Lane: Lithgow Zig Zag
- Lithgow, Gas Works Lane: Lithgow Coal Stage Signal Box
- Lithgow, Inch Street: Lithgow Blast Furnace
- Lithgow, Jenolan Caves Road: McKanes Falls Bridge
- Lithgow, Main West Line 156.334 km, James Street: Lithgow Underbridge
- Lithgow, Main Western railway: Eskbank railway station, New South Wales
- Lithgow, Main Western railway: Ten Tunnels Deviation
- Lithgow, Railway Parade: Lithgow railway station
- Lithgow, Top Points Zig Zag railway: Cooerwull railway footbridge
- Marrangaroo, Main Western railway: Marrangaroo railway viaduct
- Old Bowenfels, 70 Mudgee Street: Bowenfels National School Site
- Portland, Carlton Road: Raffan's Mill and Brick Bottle Kilns
- Portland, Williwa Street: Portland Cement Works Precinct
- Rydal, Main Western railway: Rydal railway station
- Rydal, Main Western railway: Rydal rail underbridges
- Sodwalls, off Cuthill Road: Cox's Road and Early Deviations - Sodwalls, Fish River Descent Precinct
- Tarana, Main Western railway: Tarana railway station
- Wallerawang, Main Street: St John the Evangelist Church, Wallerawang
- Wallerawang, Main Western railway: Coxs River railway bridges, Wallerangang
- Wallerawang, Main Western railway: Wallerawang railway station
- Wambool, Main Western railway: Wambool old-rail truss overbridges
