= Serhii Polubotko =

Ukrainian blacksmith (born 1962)

- Сергій Полуботько
- Born: 1962 (age 63–64); Ivano-Frankivsk, Ukrainian SSR, Soviet Union
- Other names: Serhiy Polubotko; Sergiy Polubotko; Sergii Polubotko; Sergey Polubotko
- Occupations: Artist blacksmith, cultural organizer
- Years active: 1988-present
- Organizations: Ukrainian Union of Blacksmith Masters; National Union of Architects of Ukraine; Kovalska Fabryka "ARMA"
- Known for: Founding and organizing the international blacksmith festival Sviato Kovaliv in Ivano-Frankivsk; initiating the With Love to Ukraine forged-cross project

Serhii Polubotko (Ukrainian: Сергій Полуботько; born 1962) is a Ukrainian artist blacksmith and cultural organizer. He is a founder and long-time organizer of the international blacksmith festival Sviato Kovaliv in Ivano-Frankivsk, Ukraine, and chairs the Ukrainian Union of Blacksmith Masters. He directs the workshop and company "Kovalska fabryka 'ARMA'" in Ivano-Frankivsk. Since 2022 he has coordinated the international With Love to Ukraine project, which gathered more than 175, and later over 200, forged crosses from over 25 countries for traveling exhibitions in Europe. He is a member of the National Union of Architects of Ukraine and the Union of Masters of Folk Art of Ukraine.

== Early life and education ==
Polubotko was born in Ivano-Frankivsk in 1962. He graduated from the local institute of arts in 1988, initially working as an artist. During the late 1980s he learned blacksmithing while assisting Oleg Boyko, one of the first local masters to revive the craft. In 1999 he helped stage a first regional blacksmithing exhibition in the city.

== Career ==
Polubotko became a leading organizer of Sviato Kovaliv (The Blacksmiths Festival, Ukrainian: Свято ковалів) in Ivano-Frankivsk in the early 2000s. City sources date the start to 2001 and describe it as one of the city's largest cultural events, while other materials note the first full festival in 2003. He served as chairman of the Ukrainian Union of Blacksmith Masters and continues to curate and host public forging programs, exhibitions, and lectures tied to the festival.

Beyond the festival he manages Kovalska Fabryka "ARMA", a company established in the late 1990s that designs and produces forged architectural and artistic metalwork.

== Work and themes ==
Polubotko's work spans architectural ironwork, sculptural metal, and public forging projects. He has been active as a lecturer and organizer in Ivano-Frankivsk and helped promote the city's participation in the Ring of European Cities of Iron Works. At the start of the 2022 full-scale invasion he joined the local volunteer blacksmith group producing defensive obstacles.

Polubotko has collaborated with local heritage activists on restoring historic metal doors and fittings in Ivano-Frankivsk. Examples include a 2017 project on Trusha street with curator Mariia Kozakevych.

Polubotko has given demonstrations and talks abroad, including appearances connected to Artist-Blacksmith's Association of North America (ABANA) in 2002 and the California Blacksmith Association in 2008, and as a demonstrator at the 2017 Mid-Atlantic Smith's Association Hammer-in (MASA) in Maryland.

In August 2022, after receiving a forged metal cross in a humanitarian parcel from Slovak blacksmith Daniel Miklos, Polubotko invited smiths worldwide to forge crosses up to 500 mm tall, combining steel with copper, bronze, or brass. the call gathered works from dozens of countries. exhibitions followed in Norway, the Netherlands, Belgium, Finland, and other venues. In October 2023 the war museum in Overloon hosted a large presentation of the collection, which then continued to other European sites. In 2025 Finnish partners announced further showings in Helsinki and Fiskars village, citing more than 200 crosses from 27 countries.

In 2024-2025 his work Glory to the Sunflower (Слава Соняху) made from brass ammunition casings and steel was shown in the Museum of International Folk Art's exhibition Amidst Cries from the Rubble: Art of Loss and Resilience from Ukraine.

Polubotko continues to create works from repurposed war materials while organizing touring exhibitions.
