= Lithgow Coal Stage Signal Box =

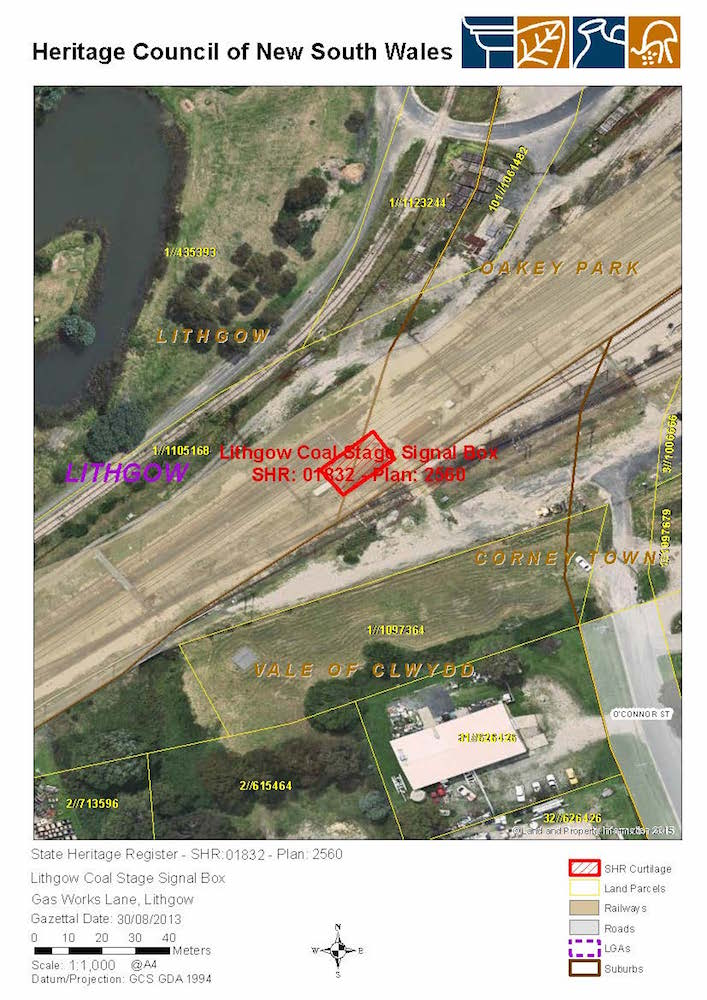
- Heritage boundaries
- Coordinates: 33°28′30″S 150°10′25″E
- Crosses: Main Western Line; Associated marshalling lines
- Locale: Gas Works Lane, Lithgow, City of Lithgow, New South Wales, Australia
- Owner: Transport Asset Manager of New South Wales

Characteristics
- Design: Elevated signal box
- Material: Timber / weatherboard / corrugated iron

Rail characteristics
- No. of tracks: 6 (perpendicular at that location)
- Track gauge: 4 ft 8 1/2 in (1,435 mm) standard gauge

History
- Contracted lead designer: New South Wales Government Railways
- Construction start: 1885
- Construction end: 1925

New South Wales Heritage Register
- Official name: Lithgow Coal Stage Signal Box
- Type: State heritage (built)
- Designated: 30 August 2013
- Reference no.: 1832
- Type: Signal Box
- Category: Transport – Rail
- Builders: NSW Government Railways

Location
- Interactive map of Lithgow Coal Stage Signal Box

The Lithgow Coal Stage Signal Box is a heritage-listed former railway bridge and now railway signal box at Gas Works Lane, Lithgow, City of Lithgow, New South Wales, Australia. It was designed by New South Wales Government Railways and built from 1885 to 1925 by NSW Government Railways. The property is owned by Transport Asset Manager of New South Wales, an agency of the Government of New South Wales. It was added to the New South Wales State Heritage Register on 30 August 2013.

== History ==
The line opened in 1869 but there was no station for Lithgow until 1877.

Lithgow Coal Stage Box is the third built in this locality and was constructed in 1925 to cater for the expanded marshalling yards and locomotive depot which replaced the original Eskbank locomotive depot. It was a standard design of the period. The box takes its name from the 1888 unique on-line overhead coaling bunker, now demolished, but which existed when the box was built and was situated immediately westwards. It controlled access to and from the locomotive depot, local colliery branch lines as well as locomotives using the 1888 on-line overhead coaling bunker. Initially, it contained 64 mechanical levers but now many of those are not in use. In 1957 with electrification of the Lithgow Yard its signalling system was adapted for changing technology including electric light signalling. The original timber steps have been replaced by metal steps.

== Description ==
The complex comprises a type 1, timber elevated coal stage signal box, erected in 1925.

Externally, the Signal Box is a large rectangular elevated timber framed traditional signal box of a standard design with a hipped corrugated iron roof, lapped timber weatherboard wall cladding and timber framed sliding multi-pane sash windows. At the east end there is a recent steel framed staircase with a landing above the ground floor entry door.

Internally, the signal control room's walls are clad with flat beaded edge boards with flat asbestos cement panels sheeting to the ceiling. The signal and point control level mechanism remains of 64 levers while 41 still operating levers have been sympathetically adapted to operate the power light signals, points and track diagram. Also retained is an older model of telephone system, bells and other signal tools. The ground floor has exposed timber frame and ceiling/floor with the chains and rods of the interlocking lever mechanism. The space is also used for storage purposes.

=== Condition ===
As at 10 December 2009, the condition of the building and equipment is good.

The Signal Box retains a high level of intactness, and its integrity is excellent due to its operational status.

=== Modifications and dates ===
- 1957: Signal system adapted for electric light signals.

== Heritage listing ==
As at 2 December 2008, the Lithgow Coal Stage Signal Box is significant as a large and imposing elevated timber signal box that has remained in continuous operation since 1925. The signal box retains most of its original equipment and is an excellent example of a traditional early 1900s elevated timber railway signal box, sympathetically adapted to operate electric light signals and power activated points mechanisms. It is now one of the largest signal boxes remaining from a relatively small sub-group of standard railway building types. Located close to Eskbank railway station, the signal box is an important part of the larger historic Lithgow railway corridor controlling access to and from Eskbank locomotive depot, local colliery branch lines as well as locomotives using the nearby 1888 on-line overhead coaling bunker. As such, the signal box has strong associations with the surrounding industrial history of Lithgow, and remains as an important element in the evolution of railway operations in the area.

Lithgow Coal Stage Signal Box was listed on the New South Wales State Heritage Register on 30 August 2013 having satisfied the following criteria.

The place is important in demonstrating the course, or pattern, of cultural or natural history in New South Wales.

Lithgow Coal Stage Signal Box is of historical significance as one of the largest and most intact traditional timber signal boxes remaining in the State and continues in operating condition dating from 1925. It is part of the larger Lithgow railway historic precinct and marks an important phase in the evolution of railway operations in the city.

The place has a strong or special association with a person, or group of persons, of importance of cultural or natural history of New South Wales's history.

The Coal Stage signal box has strong associations with the earlier coaling operations as well as the branch colliery and other industrial lines in particular the State Mine and Power Station line.

The place is important in demonstrating aesthetic characteristics and/or a high degree of creative or technical achievement in New South Wales.

Coal Stage Signal Box is of aesthetic significance as an excellent and intact example of the traditional larger timber elevated signal box.

The place has potential to yield information that will contribute to an understanding of the cultural or natural history of New South Wales.

The Signal Box has a high level of both technical and research potential for its ability to demonstrate characteristics and design requirements of standard elevated timber boxes of the 1920s as well as changing technology in the signalling system.

The place possesses uncommon, rare or endangered aspects of the cultural or natural history of New South Wales.

Coal Stage Signal Box is relatively rare as an operating box of this vintage.

The place is important in demonstrating the principal characteristics of a class of cultural or natural places/environments in New South Wales.

The Signal Box is a representative example of traditional timber elevated signal boxes of its design. Other examples at Homebush, Parramatta, Mount Victoria, Hamilton, (brick) Lithgow Yard, Katoomba, Newnes Junction (weatherboard).

== See also ==
- List of railway bridges in New South Wales
