= Lithgow, New South Wales =

Town in New South Wales, Australia

Lithgow
- City
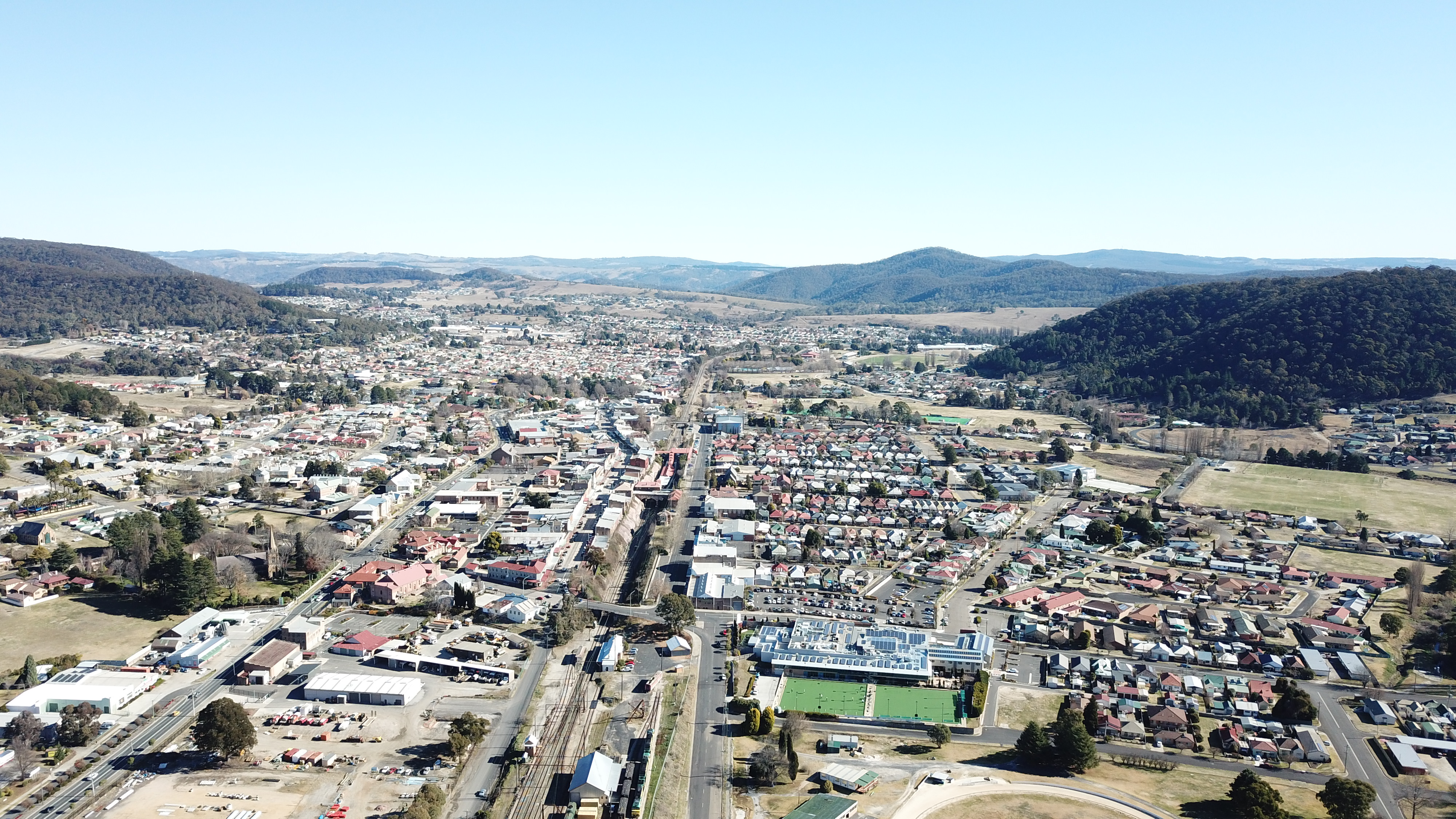
- Aerial view of Lithgow in June 2018, looking west

- Coordinates: 33°29′S 150°09′E
- Country: Australia
- State: New South Wales
- LGA: City of Lithgow
- Location: 150 km (93 mi) NW of Sydney; 39 km (24 mi) NW of Katoomba; 60 km (37 mi) E of Bathurst; 128 km (80 mi) SE of Mudgee
- Established: 1870s

Government
  - State electorate: Bathurst
  - Federal division: Calare
- Elevation: 950 m (3,120 ft)

Population
  - Total: 20,000 (2020)
- Postcode: 2790
- County: Cook
- Parish: Lett
- Mean max temp: 18.2 °C (64.8 °F)
- Mean min temp: 6.4 °C (43.5 °F)
- Annual rainfall: 860.1 mm (33.86 in)

Lithgow is a city in the Central Tablelands of New South Wales, Australia and is the administrative centre of the City of Lithgow local government area. It is located in a mountain valley named Lithgow's Valley by John Oxley in honour of William Lithgow, the Auditor-General of the colony of New South Wales.

Lithgow is on the Great Western Highway, about 150 km (95 mi) west of Sydney, or via the old mountain route, Bells Line of Road, from Windsor. At June 2021 Lithgow had an urban population of 11,197. Lithgow is surrounded by a varied landscape characterised by seven valleys which include national parks, one of which, the Blue Mountains National Park, is a World Heritage Area. The Wollemi National Park is home to the Jurassic-age tree the Wollemi Pine, which was found growing in a remote canyon in the park.

== Location ==
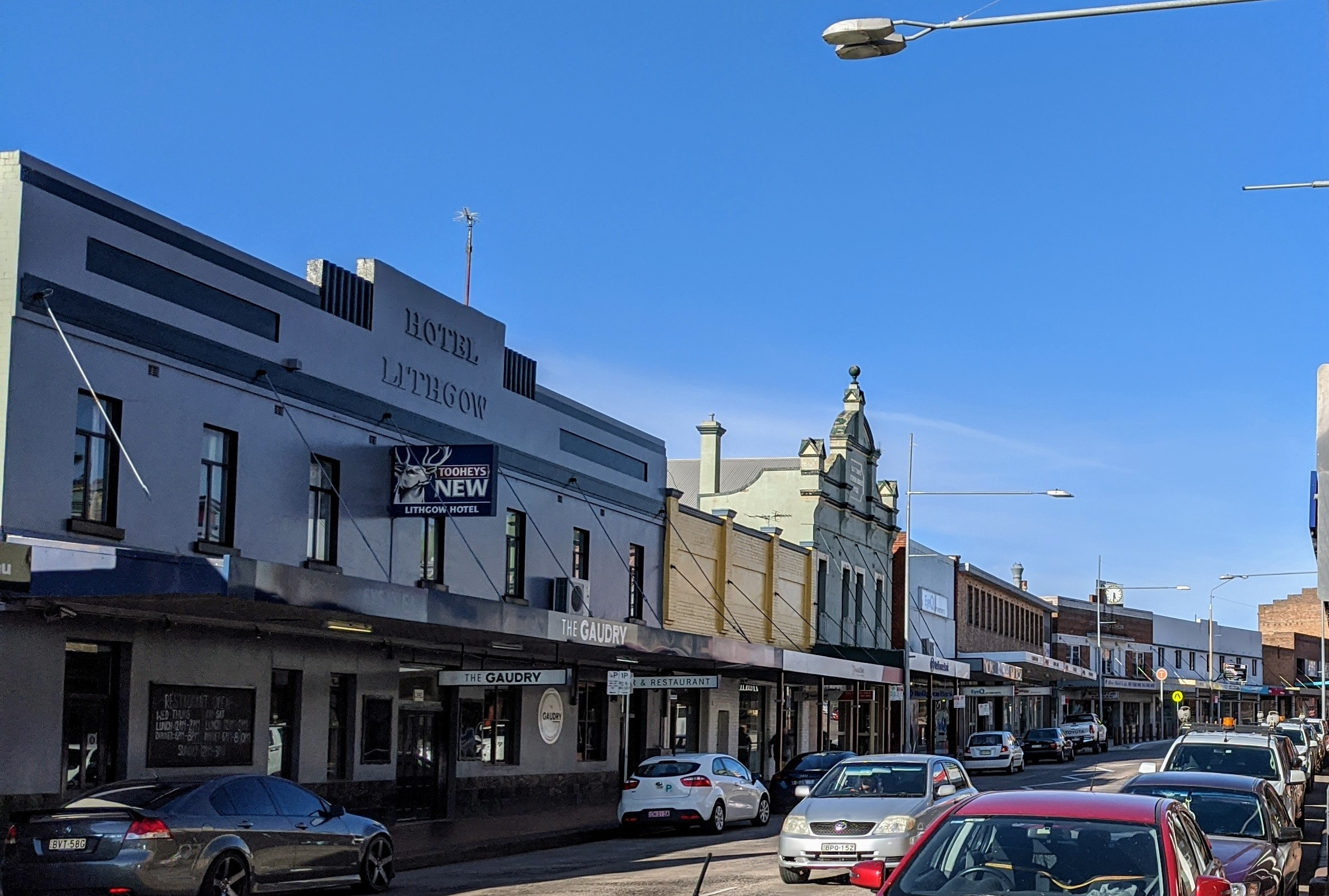
Main Street Shops in 2019

The city sits on the western edge of the sandstone country of the Blue Mountains and is usually considered the first true country town west of Sydney. Immediate surrounding areas include the old mining hamlet of Vale of Clwydd and Oakey Park, a famous iron and steel village, of which fiery night scenes have been depicted in many paintings, as well as large areas of bush and state forest. The next city to the west is Bathurst, 60 km (37 mi) away.

Lithgow is in the NSW State electorate of Bathurst, while federally it is part of electorate of Calare. Lithgow is the western terminus for the electric section of the Main Western railway line from Sydney. It is home to the Zig Zag Railway.

== History ==
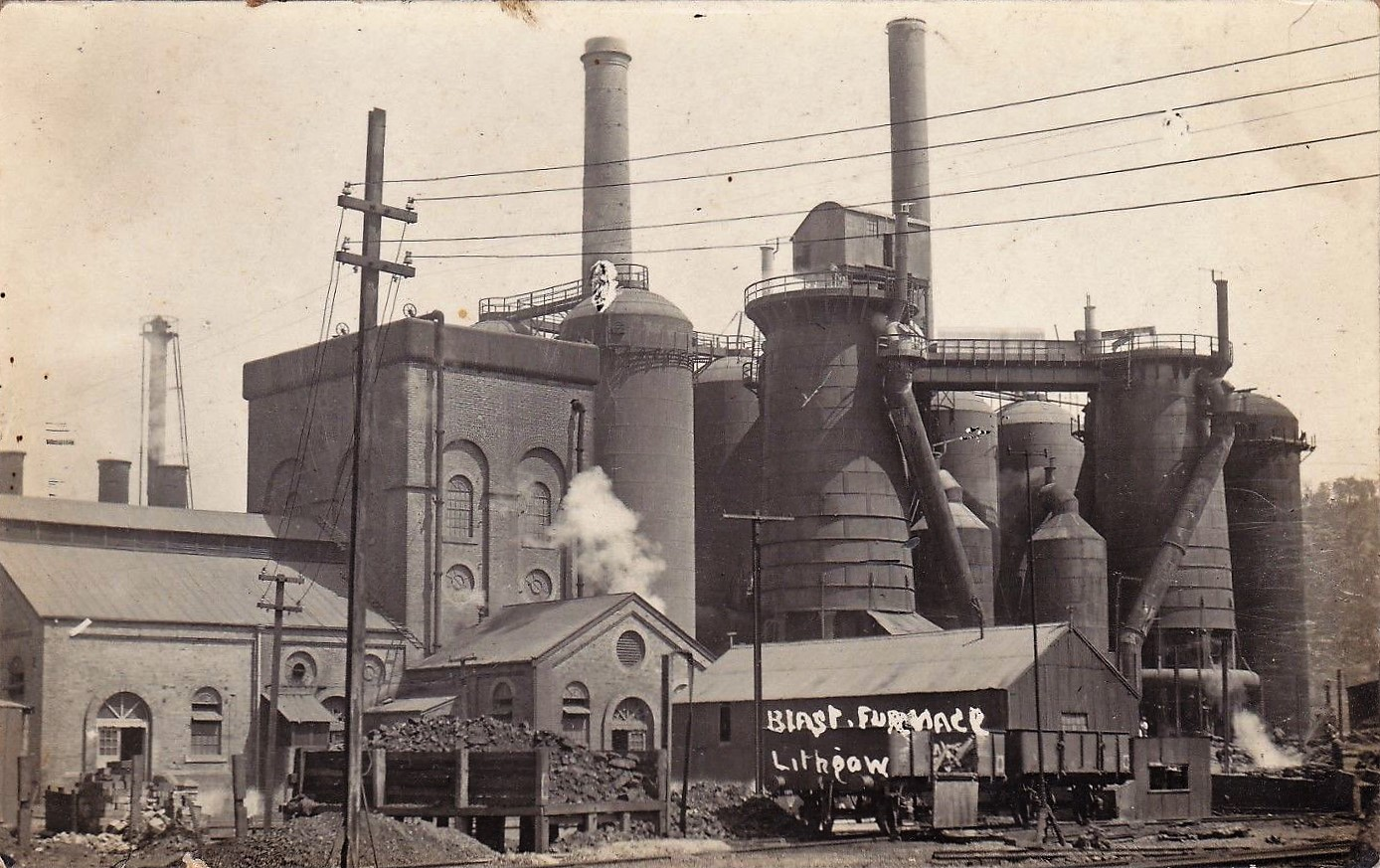
Lithgow Blast Furnace

The mountainous terrain of the Blue Mountains and the expense of building long tunnels required the construction of the Lithgow Zig Zag between 1866 and 1869. The line was opened as far as Bowenfels, just to the west, in 1869, but Lithgow station was not opened until 1877. Although it was superseded in 1910 by more modern engineering methods, including ten tunnels, parts of the Zig Zag have been developed into a popular tourist attraction. Following a period of industrialisation in the late 1860s and 1870s, the town of Lithgow boomed during the 1880s, and it was incorporated as a borough in 1889.

The town situated in the centre of a coal mining district and there is one coal-powered power station nearby. It is the site of Australia's first commercially viable steel mill, the ruins of which are open for inspection at "Blast Furnace Park". Due to the abundance of coal and relative proximity to Sydney, in the areas surrounding Lithgow is one of the largest power stations in NSW, the Mount Piper Power Station. The Wallerawang Power Station closed in 2014 and was subsequently demolished. The Lithgow Power Station was operational from 1928 to 1964.

== Population ==
At the 2021 census, there were 12,385 people in Lithgow.

- Aboriginal and Torres Strait Islander people made up 8.3% of the population.
- 82.2% of people were born in Australia. The most common other countries of birth were England 2.2%, New Zealand 1.1%, Philippines 0.7%, India 0.6% and Scotland 0.4%.
- 86.5% of people only spoke English at home. Other languages spoken at home included Italian, Thai and Mandarin, all at 0.3%.
- The most common responses for religion were No Religion 34.2%, Catholic 20.7% and Anglican 16.4%.

Historical population
Year	Pop.	±%
1921	13,275	—
1933	13,444	+1.3%
1947	14,461	+7.6%
1954	15,128	+4.6%
1961	14,229	−5.9%
1966	13,265	−6.8%
1971	13,146	−0.9%
1976	12,703	−3.4%
1981	12,793	+0.7%
1986	12,369	−3.3%
1991	11,968	−3.2%
1996	11,441	−4.4%
2001	11,023	−3.7%
2006	11,298	+2.5%
2011	11,143	−1.4%
2016	11,530	+3.5%
2021	11,197	−2.9%
Source: Australian Bureau of Statistics data.

== Heritage listings ==
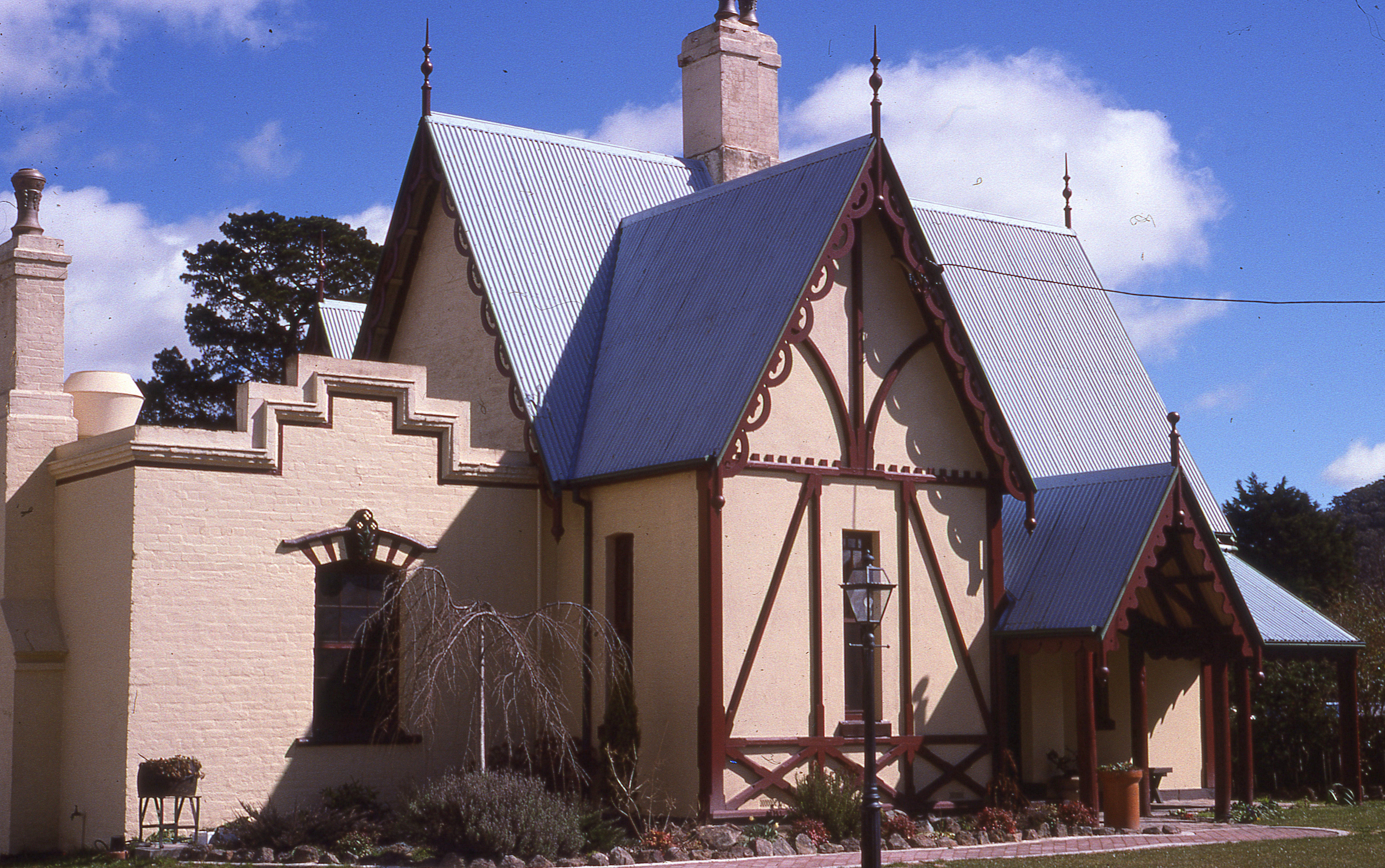
St Helens

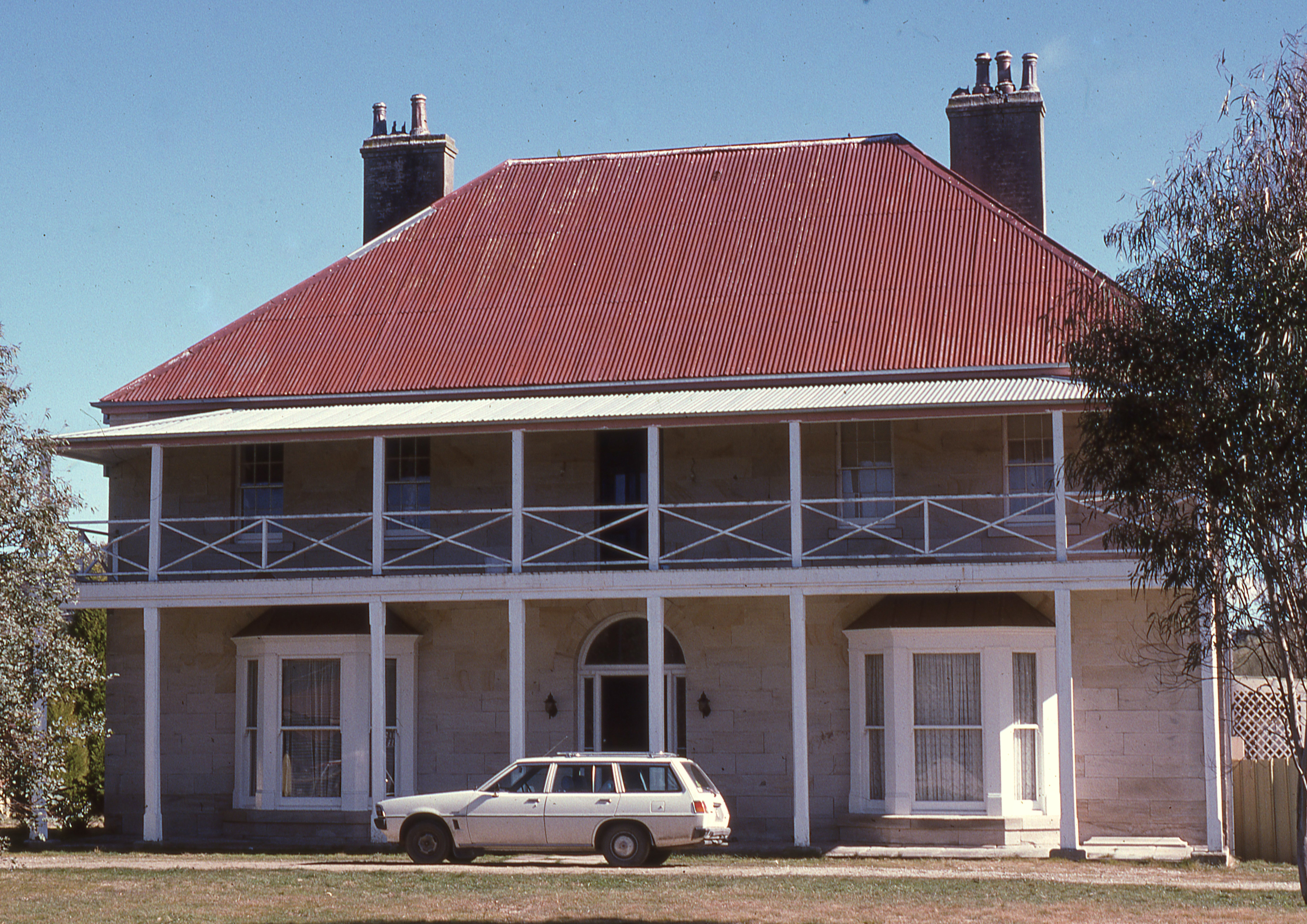
Methven

Lithgow has a number of heritage-listed sites, including the following listed on the New South Wales State Heritage Register:

- Bent Street: Lithgow Valley Colliery and Pottery Site
- Brewery Lane: Lithgow Zig Zag
- Gas Works Lane: Lithgow Coal Stage Signal Box
- Inch Street: Lithgow Blast Furnace
- 70 Inch Street: Eskbank House
- Jenolan Caves Road: McKanes Falls Bridge
- Main West Line 156.334 km, James Street: Lithgow Underbridge
- Main Western railway: Eskbank railway station
- Main Western railway: Ten Tunnels Deviation
- Railway Parade: Lithgow railway station
- Top Points Zig Zag railway: Cooerwull railway footbridge

In addition, the following sites were listed on the (now defunct) Register of the National Estate:

- Former Station Master's Residence (now Caddie's Restaurant), a sandstone cottage designed by John Clifton and built in 1869
- Eskbank House, Bennett Street, built by Thomas Brown in 1842
- Lithgow Valley Pottery Site Kiln, 1875 to 1908
- Lithgow Court House, corner Bridge and Mort Streets, a brick building in the Arts and Crafts style
- La Salle Cottage (formerly Cooerwull Academy), Rabaul Street, a stone building in the Victorian Gothic Revival style, built circa 1882
- Methven, Lidsdale Road, a sandstone house built by Andrew Brown in the 1870s
- Lithgow Small Arms Factory

Lithgow was also the location of an alleged assassination attempt on the life of Queen Elizabeth II in 1970.

== Climate ==
Lithgow features a moderate oceanic climate (Köppen climate classification Cfb) with mild to warm summers, cool to cold winters and generally steady precipitation year-round. Despite its location on highlands, Lithgow manages to have 90.3 clear days annually.

Lithgow is one of the few Australian cities to see appreciable snowfall, though mostly insignificant in quantity due to the winter rain shadow brought about by the ranges to the west of the city. One major event was the late-season snowfall in October 2014, where 20 centimetres (7.9 in) of snow fell.

Climate data for Lithgow (Birdwood St, 1912–2006, rainfall to 1889); 950 m AMSL; 33.49° S, 150.15° E
Month	Jan	Feb	Mar	Apr	May	Jun	Jul	Aug	Sep	Oct	Nov	Dec	Year
Record high °C (°F)	37.8 (100.0)	38.4 (101.1)	35.1 (95.2)	30.8 (87.4)	23.9 (75.0)	19.5 (67.1)	19.8 (67.6)	22.5 (72.5)	27.6 (81.7)	33.1 (91.6)	37.2 (99.0)	36.8 (98.2)	38.4 (101.1)
Mean daily maximum °C (°F)	25.5 (77.9)	24.7 (76.5)	22.4 (72.3)	18.4 (65.1)	14.3 (57.7)	11.1 (52.0)	10.4 (50.7)	12.0 (53.6)	15.4 (59.7)	18.7 (65.7)	21.5 (70.7)	24.5 (76.1)	18.2 (64.8)
Mean daily minimum °C (°F)	11.9 (53.4)	12.1 (53.8)	10.1 (50.2)	6.7 (44.1)	3.9 (39.0)	1.8 (35.2)	0.7 (33.3)	1.3 (34.3)	3.4 (38.1)	6.0 (42.8)	8.1 (46.6)	10.4 (50.7)	6.4 (43.5)
Record low °C (°F)	2.8 (37.0)	3.5 (38.3)	0.0 (32.0)	−4.0 (24.8)	−6.1 (21.0)	−7.0 (19.4)	−8.0 (17.6)	−8.0 (17.6)	−5.0 (23.0)	−2.3 (27.9)	−1.7 (28.9)	0.6 (33.1)	−8.0 (17.6)
Average precipitation mm (inches)	94.3 (3.71)	83.8 (3.30)	83.8 (3.30)	62.7 (2.47)	63.0 (2.48)	67.3 (2.65)	67.6 (2.66)	63.4 (2.50)	58.9 (2.32)	67.7 (2.67)	70.0 (2.76)	76.1 (3.00)	861.8 (33.93)
Average rainy days	10.6	10.2	10.6	9.1	10.4	11.7	11.7	11.1	10.2	10.3	10.0	9.8	125.7
Average snowy days	0	0	0	0.08	0.08	0.56	0.72	0.72	0.24	0.12	0	0	2.52
Average afternoon relative humidity (%)	54	58	60	59	66	67	66	56	54	51	53	50	58

== Iron and steel industry ==
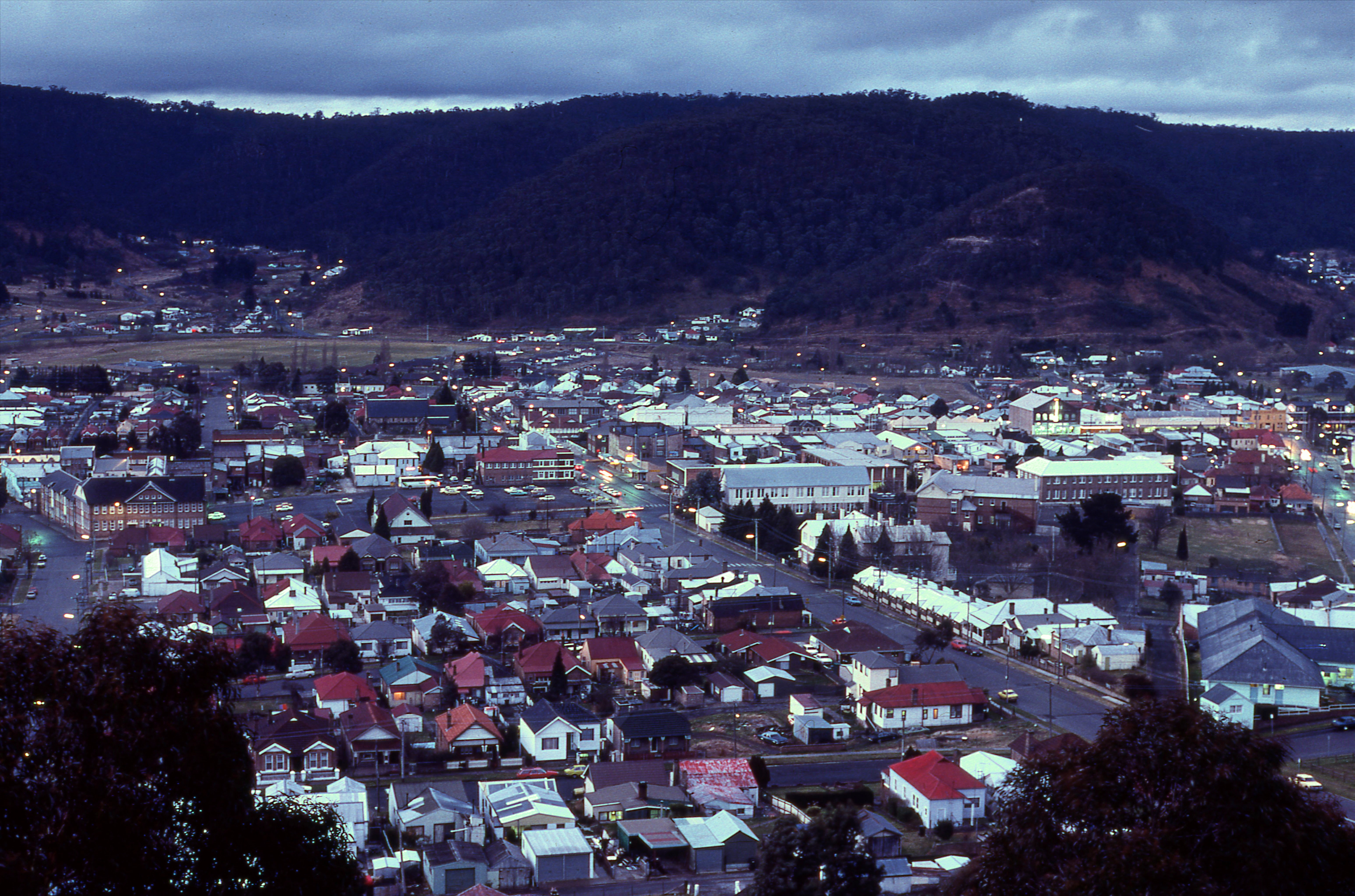
Lithgow at dusk c. 1989

In 1848, iron smelting began in Mittagong, Australia. It proved unprofitable for the remainder of the 19th century. This situation remained until the early 20th century when no iron ore was being smelted. The only iron being cast was by William Sandford in Lithgow. His works were bought by G. & C. Hoskins in 1907, who had previously been making iron pipes in Sydney. The Lithgow works acquired a reputation for industrial disputes.

== Retail ==
Lithgow has one major shopping centre—Lithgow Valley Plaza. Of which it contains parking spaces, a plaza with two anchor stores and over 30 speciality retailers.

Lithgow's Main Street is a central attraction of retail in Lithgow, containing common amenities like shops, boutiques, hairdressers, jewellers, and a florist. It is also the hub of many services such as banking, medical and dental care, and a gym and yoga centre.

== Tourist attractions ==
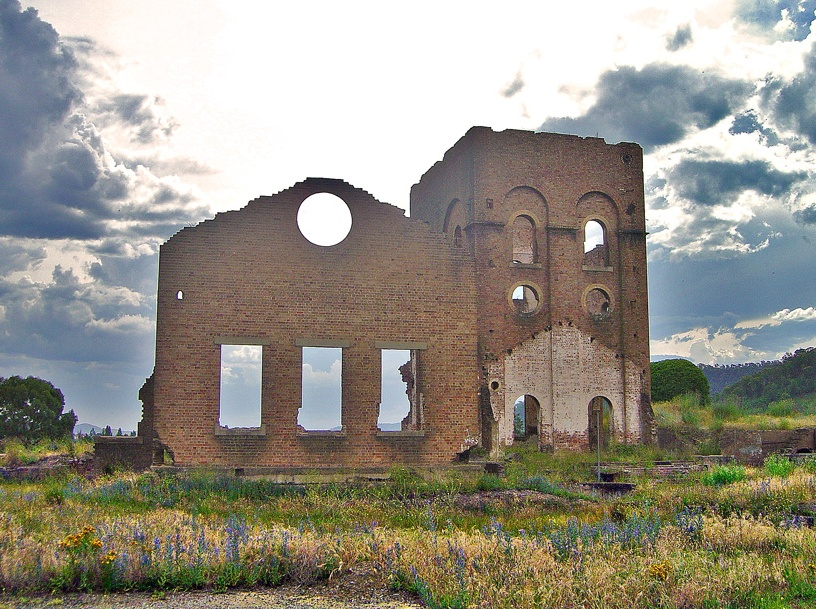
Blast Furnace park

Lithgow is adjacent to a number of national parks and other attractions. Places to visit include the Zig Zag Railway, Glow Worm Tunnel, Newnes in the Wolgan Valley and Glen Davis in the Capertee Valley, the second largest canyon in the world.

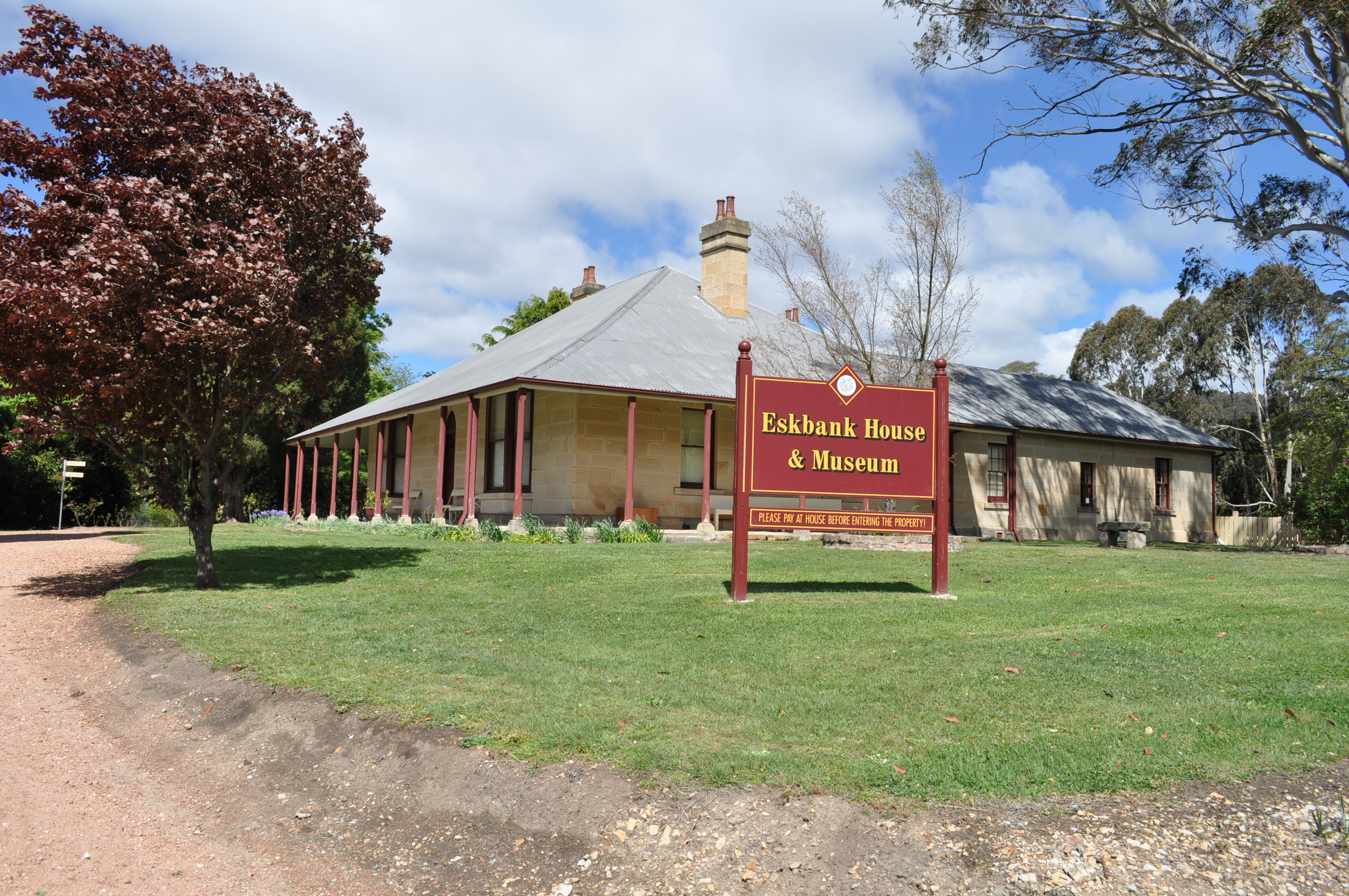
Eskbank House

Other attractions include the Hartley Historic Site, Lithgow Small Arms Factory Museum, Lithgow State Mine Heritage Park & Railway and the Eskbank House Museum. Lithgow is also close to Jenolan Caves, which are a World Heritage Area and lie to the south of Lithgow.

The most popular tourist event in Lithgow is Ironfest, an annual cultural heritage event that attracts over 10,000 visitors. Ironfest hosts the annual St George's Day Jousting Tournament which involves contestants from all around the world. The festival also features a colonial battle re-enactment, called the 'Battle of Lithgow' which involves over 120 participants, kitted out in fully authentic 19th century apparel, and involving cavalry, infantry and artillery. As well as these two historical re-enactment events Ironfest includes historical & auto displays, blacksmith demonstrations, art exhibitions, workshops and demonstrations, as well as live music and performances.

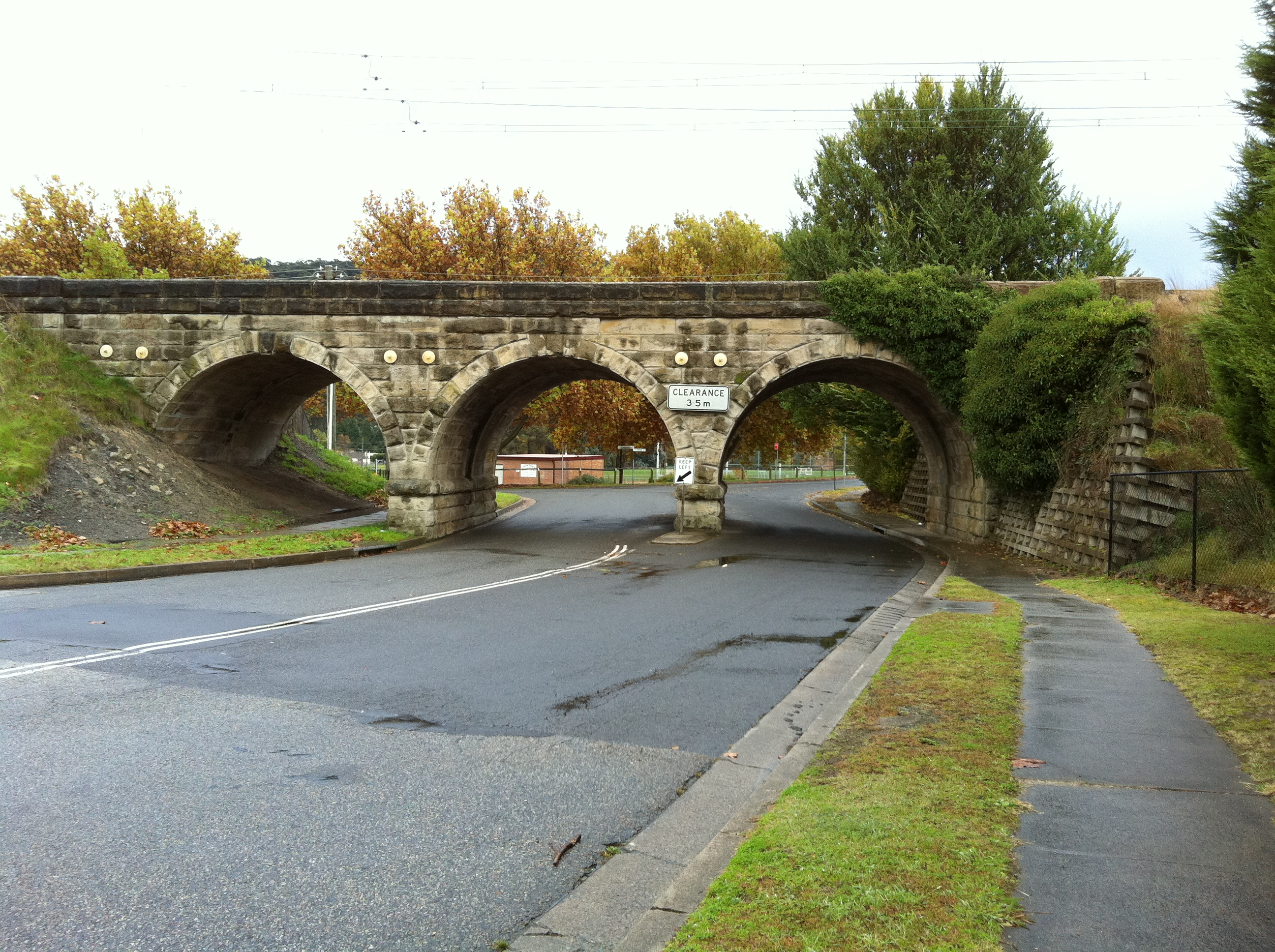
James St bridge

The Lithgow Greyhound Racing Club was established in 1928 and its Saturday race meetings are also a popular tourist attraction. The annual feature event is the Lithgow Golden Muzzle held every December, which is sponsored by the Lithgow Workers Club.

== Media ==
Electronic media in Lithgow is represented by ABC Central West and commercial radio stations 2LT and Move FM operated by the Midwest Radio Network, public broadcasters ABC and SBS, and commercial television networks Seven, WIN (Nine) and Channel 10, 7two, 7mate, 7flix, 9Gem, 9Go!, 9Life, 10 Drama and 10 Comedy.

There is a free fortnightly paper – The Central West Village Voice. The Lithgow Mercury is a newspaper published weekly.

== Transport ==
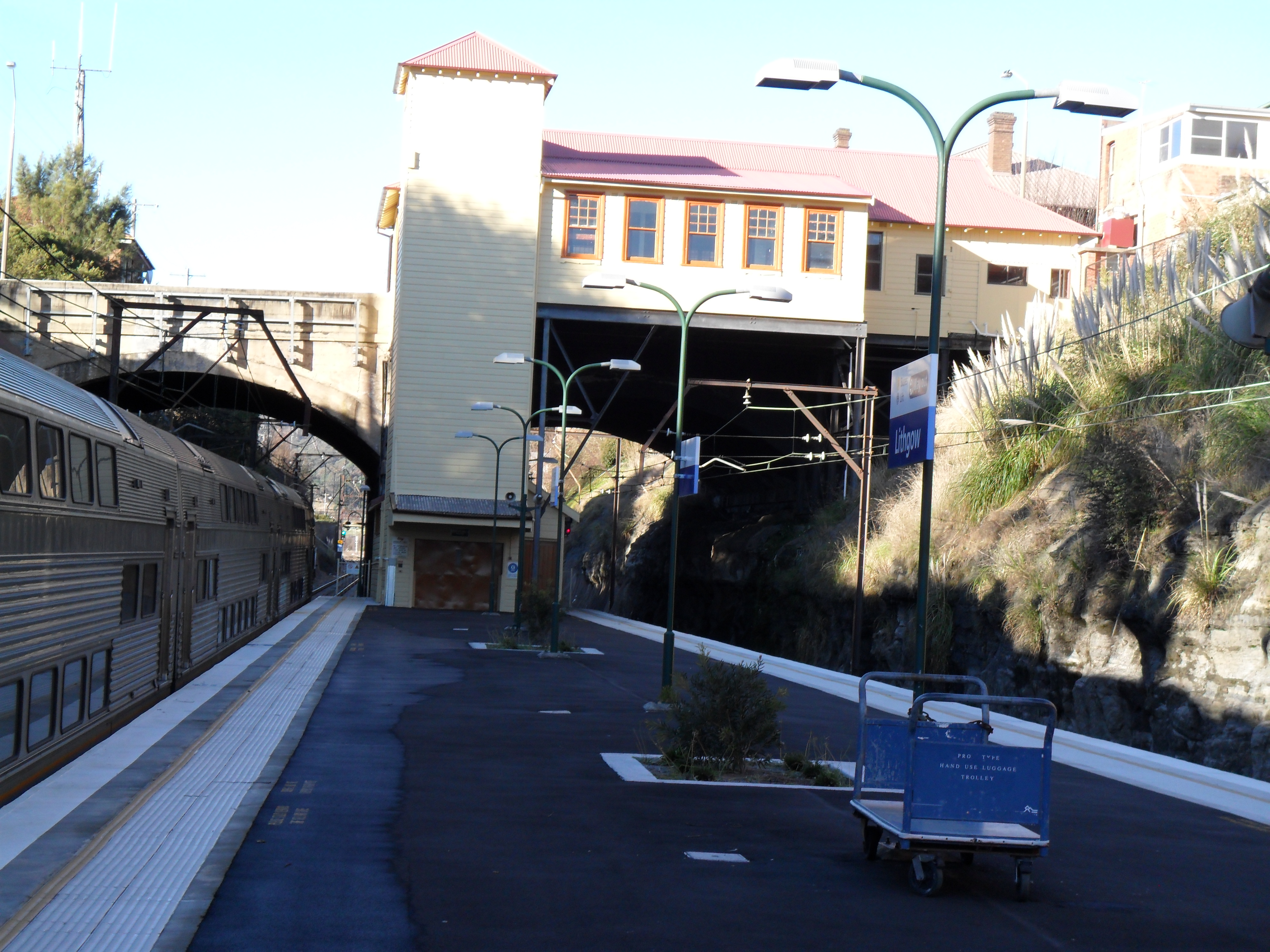
Lithgow railway station

Local bus services are operated by Lithgow Buslines.

Lithgow railway station on the Main Western railway line is the terminus for Sydney Trains intercity Blue Mountains Line services from Sydney. As well as being a calling point for the Bathurst Bullet, Central West Express and Outback Xplorer services to Bathurst, Dubbo and Broken Hill, it is the terminus for road coach services from Orange, Grenfell, Dubbo, Nyngan, Parkes and Coonabarabran.

In 1983, the State Rail Authority opened the Lithgow Locomotive Maintenance Centre at the eastern end of Lithgow. It is today operated by Pacific National. Southern Shorthaul Railroad has a maintenance facility at the Lithgow State Mine Heritage Park & Railway.

== Notable residents ==
- Robert Bartlett – rugby league and lawn bowls player.
- Andrew Brown – the first European settler of the Lithgow Valley and a prominent industrialist and philanthropist.
- Albert Burdus – rugby league player
- Cardinal Edward Clancy (1923–2014) – the seventh Roman Catholic Archbishop of Sydney, Australia (1983–2001) was born in Lithgow.
- Joseph Cook (1860–1947) – English Australian politician, resident of Lithgow and member for Hartley, and Parramatta. Sixth Prime Minister of Australia.
- John Doyle – a comedian of the duo Roy & HG, was born in Lithgow.
- Wayde Egan – rugby league player for the Penrith Panthers and the New Zealand Warriors.
- Roy Heffernan – professional Wrestler, Tag Team Champions The Fabulous Kangaroos, Mr Australia was born in Lithgow 1925.
- Nancy Hill – basketball player.
- Charles Hoskins – industrialist significant in the development of the iron and steel industry, lived at the former home of William Sandford, from 1908 to 1912.
- Marjorie Jackson-Nelson – athlete and Olympic gold medalist ("The Lithgow Flash") and later, Governor of South Australia, was raised in Lithgow.
- Nina Eva Vida Jones (1882–1966) – socialite and motor racing driver, married to John Alexander Stammers Jones (1870–1933) – brewer of Lithgow.
- Leon Morris (1914–2006) – Theologian and New Testament Scholar
- Laurie Oakes – journalist, was educated at Lithgow High School, being dux in 1961.
- David Palmer – squash player, was born in Lithgow.
- Ben Reynolds – rugby league player.
- Marty Roebuck – a former rugby union Wallabies fullback, was born in Lithgow.
- William Sandford (1841–1932) – industrialist and pioneer of the iron and steel industry, lived at 'Eskroy Park', now part of the clubhouse of the Lithgow Golf Club, from 1890 to 1908.
- Jordan Shanks – comedian and YouTuber
- William John Truscott (1886–1966) – Australian Rules footballer for the East Fremantle Football Club from 1913 to 1927.
