= Lithgow Valley Colliery and Pottery Site =

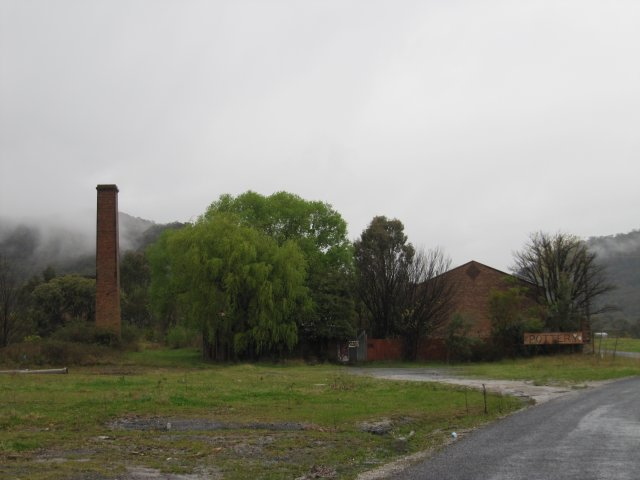

- Location within New South Wales Location within Australia
- 33°29′09″S 150°09′19″E
- Location: Bent Street, Lithgow, City of Lithgow, New South Wales, Australia

History
- Built: 1876–1945

New South Wales Heritage Register
- Official name: Lithgow Valley Colliery and Pottery Site; Lithgow Pottery and Brickworks
- Type: State heritage (built)
- Designated: 2 April 1999
- Reference no.: 78
- Type: Kiln Pottery
- Category: Manufacturing and Processing

The Lithgow Valley Colliery and Pottery Site is a heritage-listed former pottery and colliery and now pottery and visitor attraction at Bent Street, Lithgow, City of Lithgow, New South Wales, Australia. It was built from 1876 to 1945. It is also known as Lithgow Pottery and Brickworks. The property is privately owned. It was added to the New South Wales State Heritage Register on 2 April 1999.

== History ==
The site listed on the State Heritage Register No. 78 contains the archaeological remains of the clay products division of Lithgow Valley Colliery Co. Ltd. one of Lithgow's most significant and long-lived industrial companies. The rich and accessible coal seams in the Lithgow Valley were exploited vigorously after the rail link to the coast and to the west was opened in 1869. Thomas Brown, a Scottish pastoralist who owned the central and eastern part of the valley, himself opened two coal mines (Esk Creek and Eskbank); he also sold his southerly portions (54 and 87 in the original parish of Lett) to Bathurst entrepreneurs who established Lithgow Valley Colliery (LVC) in 1872-3.

=== Diversification ===
The three principal colliery companies in Lithgow all diversified in the later 1870s: Eskbank into iron and bricks, the Vale of Clwydd into copper and LVC into clay products. The area immediately to the east of the LVC mine was developed first by lease, then by direct investment. The name used by the LVC in all its surviving catalogues for clay products is the Lithgow Pottery and Brickworks which produced bricks, pipes, chimney-pots, tiles and, for a time, domestic pottery.

The brickworks was the first to be established in 1876 when a brickmaker called Aston was operating a clamp-kiln. This was followed by a pipe-making kiln in 1878, manufacturing both sanitary and agricultural pipes. In 1879 the first pottery kiln was built, operated by a skilful English potter, James Silcock.

==== Domestic pottery ====
The domestic products from the pottery have won justifiable acclaim, with major collections on display at Eskbank House's new gallery in Lithgow and at the Powerhouse Museum in Sydney. Under a succession of master potters, the pottery flourished aesthetically but was the least profitable part of the LVC business and was closed between 1896 and 1905. A brief, though celebrated, revival occurred under a lessee, Arthur Brownfield, another English potter, from 1905 to 1907, but thereafter there was no commercial production of domestic wares.

==== Pipes and bricks ====
Although the domestic pottery did not function after 1907, pipes, tiles, chimney-pots and bricks continued to be produced in large quantities, right through the Depression and during the Second World War. The competition from Fowlers in Sydney, which had a similar reliance on heavy industrial wares, was successfully met, while there was sufficient demand for bricks to make profitability possible for four or five brickworks in twentieth century Lithgow.

=== Spatial arrangement ===
In the nineteenth century the spatial arrangement of the clay products plant placed pipe-making to the north, the brick kilns to the west and the pottery to the south. In 1901 LVC same substantial capital into a state-of-the-art continuous brick-kiln, patented by Sercombe on the Hoffman model: this new and much larger kiln was inserted in the central area east of the pipe-kilns, close to the clay quarry.

In addition to these three sections (bricks, pipes, pottery) each with its own kilns, chimney-stacks, specialised work-sheds and, storage areas, there were general utilities such as a blacksmith's shop, engine house, boiler house and clay store which changed over time. The LVC company offices had been constructed in 1878 and still survive at 69 Bent Street, adjacent to a superior house for an executive at 67 Bent Street, at the extreme north of the site. The offices but not the house are covered by the State Heritage Register listing.

=== Clay supplies ===
Raw materials for all these products were on site. Just beyond the works to the east, clay and shale were excavated from the hillside, creating an ever larger clay-pit as well a quarry face. Clay was also brought in from leases at Clarence and at Marrangaroo but the combined quarry and pit on site remained in use and the quarry face is a striking feature of the modified landscape. The clay pit itself is filled in and submerged under large quantities of industrial materials.

=== Tramways ===
The tramway system which grew in complexity up to 1906 is barely visible. The last part to be built, leading from Bent Street to the east end of the Sercombe kiln, was visible as a drainage channel until the new Coalex offices and laboratory were built across it in 1981. The north end of this earlier tramway from Bent Street running south parallel to the original Hassan Street is now under Silcock Street and the tramway connecting the colliery with the clay-products section has been largely removed by works associated with the supermarket on the colliery site.

=== Closure ===
The entire production of clay products ceased in 1945 and the plant was auctioned off early in 1946. The millions of bricks manufactured on the site over 69 years built many of Lithgow's houses, can be seen in the major tunnels and deviation works on the eastern railway line and in many contexts throughout the state. The stoneware pipes met many government and municipal contracts both in the Lithgow and the metropolitan area: sewerage in many parts of the state commenced using Lithgow pipes and repair work keeps revealing these relics.

Since the auction in 1946 the clay-products site has been progressively cleared. The last surviving kiln, Big Ben, pipe-kiln no. 4, built around 1900, fell down in 1977 and since then most of the site has been cleared and/or used for dumping building materials. The only structures (other than the offices and company housing) from the industrial plant to survive are the store for patterns and pottery which also housed a sulky; the square pottery chimneystack; the rectangular clay-store with a water-tank on top, (all three in the south); and the more recent powder magazine away to the east. The colliery site to the west was systematically obliterated in 1972 to construct a supermarket, so these clay products buildings are the sole industrial relics of LVC.

=== Re-use ===
The storehouse was occupied by the distinguished local craft-potter, Bob Cunningham, in the 1970s and 1980s. Cunningham built a pottery kiln of brick in front of the store (to the east) and installed another kiln within the store. Since Cunningham left the premises in 1994, another craft-potter Cameron Williams and his wife Colleen have leased the store area, so the traditional use of the site is maintained.

==== Development ====
The north end of the Pottery and Brickworks site was developed in 1981 when the then owners Coalex Pty. Ltd. were allowed to construct new offices and laboratories on lots 2 and 3, immediately behind the original offices at 69 Bent Street. An archaeological investigation of lots 2 and 3 was undertaken by Dr Edward Higginbotham: his excavations established precise locations for the third and fourth of the four nineteenth-century pipekilns, for the two pipe-drying sheds, for the Sercombe brick-kiln of 1901 and for the last of the rail-sidings which served that brick-kiln. The legibility of the foundations was unexpectedly high and Higginbotham's photograph of the excavated foundations of part of pipe-kiln no. 3 was used as a poster by the then Department of Planning.

Following community representations from the National Trust of Australia (NSW) and the then Museum of Applied Arts and Sciences a section 136 order was placed over the site on 11 July 1979 to prevent demolition of remaining structures. An Interim Conservation Order was placed over the site on 10 August 1979 to provide to time to further investigate the significance of the site.

On 31 July 1981 the Heritage Council of NSW in recognition of the sites State heritage significance placed a Permanent Conservation Order over the site. The site was transferred to the State Heritage Register on 2 April 1999.

== Description ==
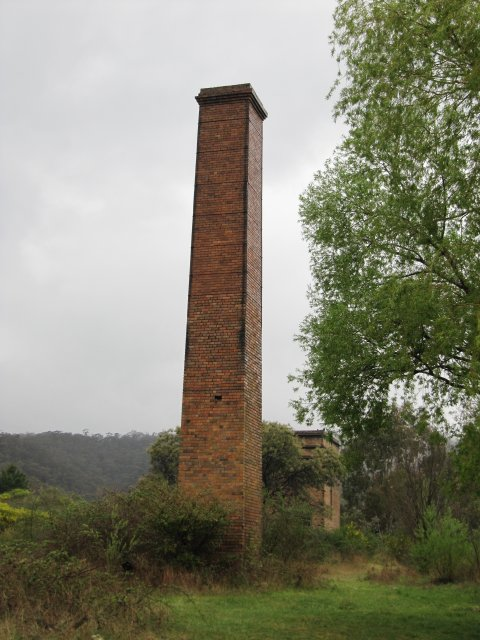
Chimney

The Lithgow Valley Colliery and Pottery Site listed on the State Heritage Register was once a part of a much larger site. The current site listed is 4.2 hectares. It contains the following:

- Pottery and Pattern Store - a brick building. Used to store pottery and patterns and also housed a sulky
- Square pottery chimney stack - brick construction. Served a number of kilns
- Clay Store - rectangular with water tank on top
- Magazine - 20th century powder magazine. Brick structure, sunk with brick protective walling and partly obscured by modern chitter
- Original Offices - Designed by a founder of Lithgow Valley Colliery, Edward Gell, a Pugin-trained architect from Yorkshire who practiced in Bathurst in the 1860s and 1870s until he moved to Lithgow as general manager of Lithgow Valley Colliery in 1880. The offices were convenient both to the colliery and the pottery. In the 1890s a new western wing, matching the gabled east wing, was added to the offices. They remained Coalex offices until the new block was built behind in 1980s and are now leased as a doctor's surgery.

=== Archaeological - condition ===
As at 27 September 2011, the archaeological potential is high.

=== Modifications and dates ===
- 1981 - New Office and laboratories constructed on lots 2 and 3.

== Heritage listing ==
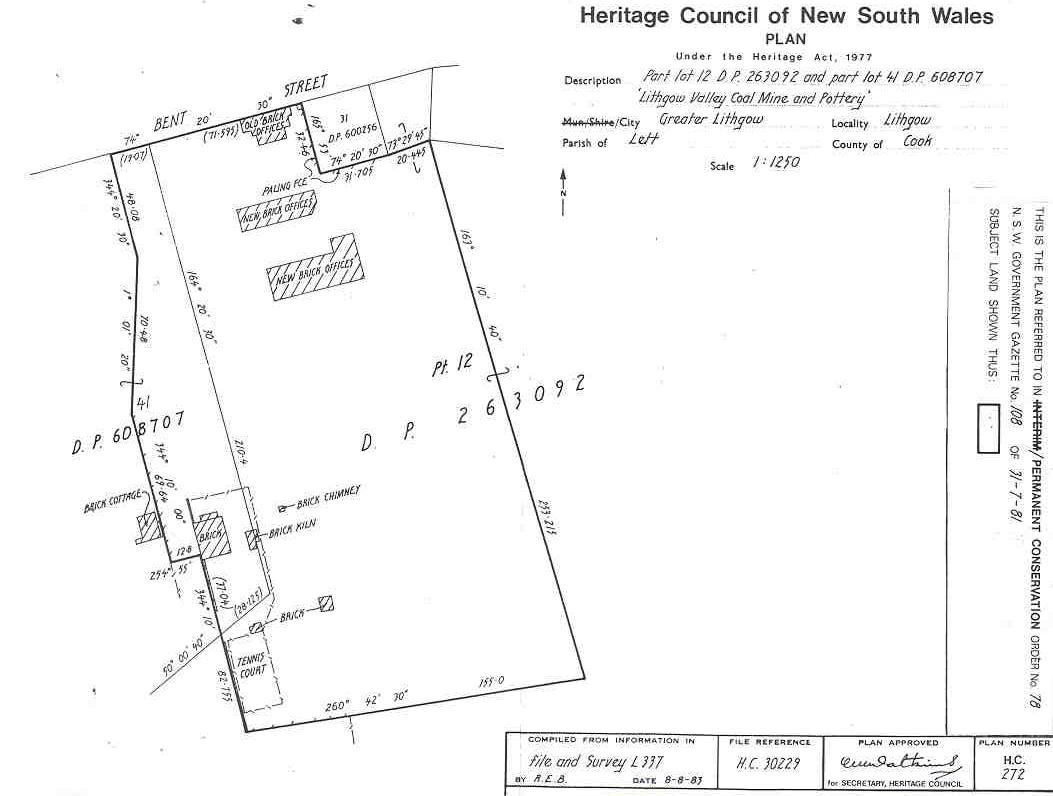
Heritage boundaries

As at 27 September 2011, Lithgow Pottery and brickworks is of State heritage significance as an important producer of basic industrial products for wide-ranging markets over a period of 69 years and distinguished tableware for 20 years. The pottery founded by James Silcock in 1879 continued by other skilled potters and refounded in 1905 by Arthur Brownfield, brought Staffordshire skills to create colonial wares capable of competing with British imports. However it was not a financial success and the high collectability of Lithgow wares today gives the pottery a higher national profile than it enjoyed whilst operating. Industrial and agricultural pipes remained an economic strength of the Lithgow Valley Colliery Co. for more than thrice the life of the pottery. Despite strong competition from Sydney makers of ceramic pipes and from the Hoskins firm's iron pipes, Lithgow products were used in many important drainage and sewerage plants throughout New South Wales. The brick production was very large, up to 50,000 bricks a day after the Sercombe kiln was installed in 1901 and is reflected in many major public works in the state as well as private houses in Lithgow.

The site is historically rare because of its relationship of clay products with a major colliery and an adjacent clay pit; the exceptionally high esteem in which its domestic pottery products are held and its economic importance within the Lithgow region. It is also representative of pipeworks and of successful brickworks in the state showing investment in up-to-date technology after 1901 as well as traditional brick-kiln technology.

The site's significance of its potential contribution to understanding clay-products technology in the period 1876 to 1945 is dependent entirely on the integrity of the subsurface archaeological record. A great deal of disturbance has diminished the practicality of realising the archaeological potential of much of the area. There are however two small areas containing substantial intact portions of brickwork an important concretion of pipewares and other industrial remains. These are probably not in-situ but should be investigated before any development takes place.

The pottery produced enjoys extremely high local esteem, as evidenced by the new building opened in 1996 at Eskbank House Museum in Lithgow specially to house its collection of pottery from this site. Although the pottery was in fact of minor economic significance and survived for only twenty years on a site used for other clay products for 69 years, its products are visible and collectable where pipes, chimney pots, tiles and bricks have for the most part remained functional and less well regarded. As an aspect of Lithgow Valley Colliery, the most long-lived of all Lithgow enterprises, the clay products division offered employment and company facilities (such as quoiting) which were a significant part of Lithgow life for a century.

Lithgow Valley Colliery & Pottery Site was listed on the New South Wales State Heritage Register on 2 April 1999.
