= Bogee =

Bogee New South Wales
- Coordinates: 32°57′54″S 150°6′4″E
- Population: 82 (2016 census)
- LGA(s): City of Lithgow
- State electorate(s): Bathurst
- Federal division(s): Calare

Bogee is a village in the Central West region of New South Wales, Australia. The village is located in the local government area of the City of Lithgow. It is located 233.8 km north-west of Sydney and approximately 96.4 kilometres north of Lithgow. At the 2016 census, Bogee had a population of 82.
