= Cooerwull railway footbridge =

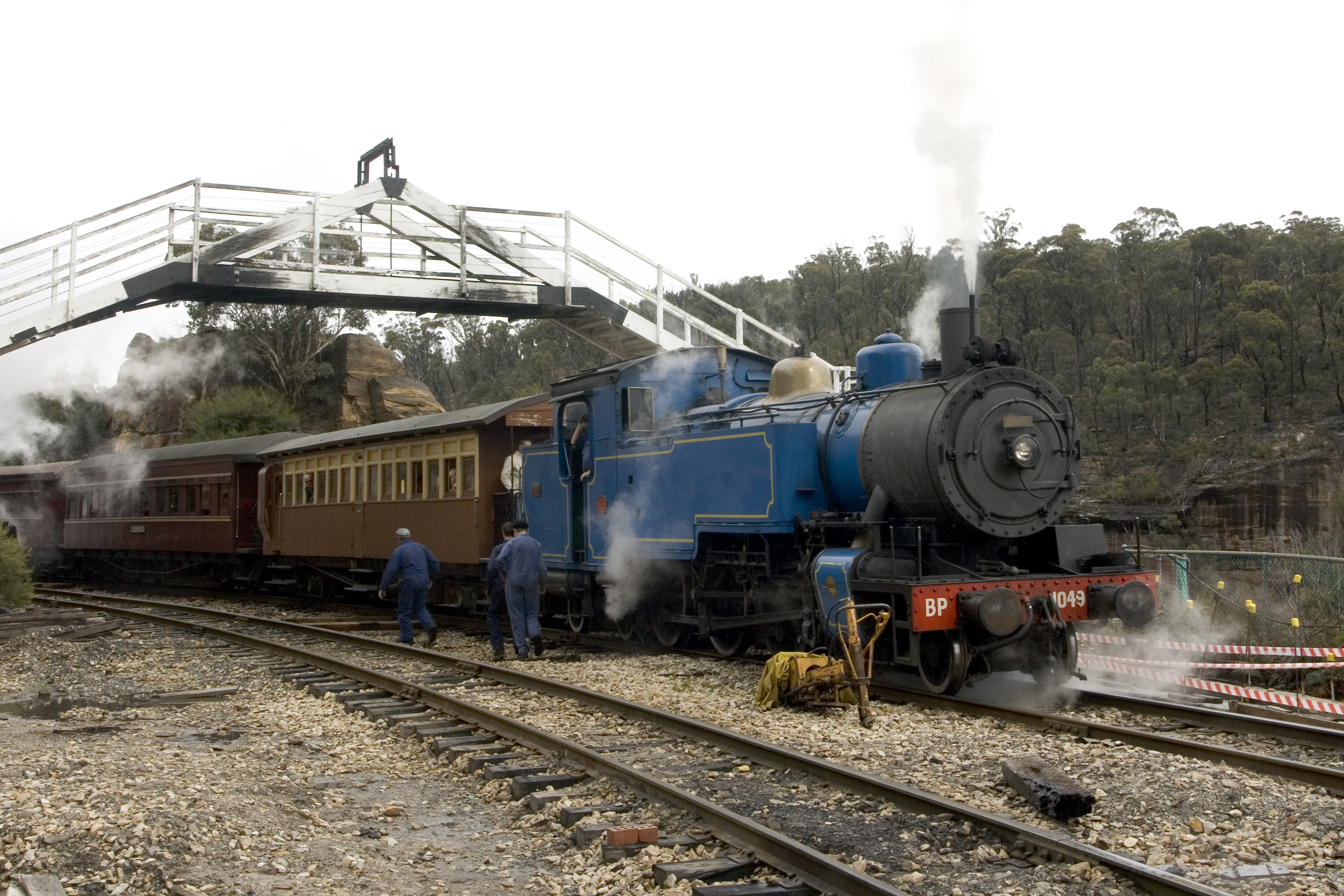
- The relocated A-frame timber footbridge, pictured at its new location at the Top Points site, Zig Zag Railway above Locomotive 1049, Stormin' Normin, in 2008.
- Coordinates: Cooerwull 33°29′01″S 150°08′36″E
- Carried: Pedestrian
- Crossed: Main Western line
- Locale: Lithgow

Characteristics
- Design: truss
- Material: Wood
- No. of spans: 1

History
- Construction start: 1941
- Construction end: 1941
- Collapsed: 2002
- Location within New South Wales
- Top Points Zag 33°28′18″S 150°11′23″E
- Location: Top Points, Zig Zag Railway, Lithgow, City of Lithgow, New South Wales, Australia

History
- Built: 2002

New South Wales Heritage Register
- Official name: Cooerwull Railway footbridge
- Type: State heritage (built)
- Designated: 2 April 1999
- Reference no.: 01115
- Type: Foot Bridge
- Category: Transport – Rail

Location
- Interactive map of Cooerwull railway footbridge

The Cooerwull railway footbridge is a heritage-listed pedestrian bridge located at Top Points Station on the Zig Zag Railway at Lithgow, New South Wales, Australia. It was built in 1941. It was added to the New South Wales State Heritage Register on 2 April 1999.

== History ==
Originally constructed in 1941 as a low-cost temporary wartime railway footbridge for workers at the nearby Lithgow Small Arms Factory. After closure of the Small Arms Factory in 1974 the footbridge was retained for public use and then replaced by a steel and concrete structure in 1995.

The State Rail Authority recognised the heritage significance of the A-frame structure and placed it, in its complete form, adjacent to its original site. Subsequently in 2002 the Zig Zag Railway negotiated removal to the footbridge to Top Points Station for display, use and preservation.

== Description ==
A timber A-frame railway footbridge at the Top Points site, Zig Zag Railway; originally located over tracks at Cooerwull.

== Heritage listing ==
As at 16 March 2006, this is the only A-frame timber bridge built in the State, built to the simplest design with local materials. It was built in 1941 as a low-cost temporary wartime railway footbridge for workers at the nearby Small Arms Factory. In 2002 it was relocated to the Top Points site of the Zig Zag Railway.

The Cooerwull railway footbridge was listed on the New South Wales State Heritage Register on 2 April 1999 having satisfied the following criteria.

The place is important in demonstrating the course, or pattern, of cultural or natural history in New South Wales.

This item is historically rare as the only A-frame timber footbridge in New South Wales.

The place has a strong or special association with a person, or group of persons, of importance of cultural or natural history of New South Wales's history.

This item is associated with the Small Arms Factory, Lithgow for which it was purpose built.

The place is important in demonstrating aesthetic characteristics and/or a high degree of creative or technical achievement in New South Wales.

This item is assessed as architecturally rare.

The place has strong or special association with a particular community or cultural group in New South Wales for social, cultural or spiritual reasons.

The footbridge has some social significance to those people who worked at the nearby Small Arms Factory.

The place has potential to yield information that will contribute to an understanding of the cultural or natural history of New South Wales.

This item is assessed as scientifically rare.

The place possesses uncommon, rare or endangered aspects of the cultural or natural history of New South Wales.

This item is rare on a state-wide basis as the only A-frame timber bridge in New South Wales.

The place is important in demonstrating the principal characteristics of a class of cultural or natural places/environments in New South Wales.

This item is representative of many "temporary" or "for the duration of the war" structures that remain in New South Wales.

== See also ==
- List of pedestrian bridges in Australia
