= Lithgow Underbridge =

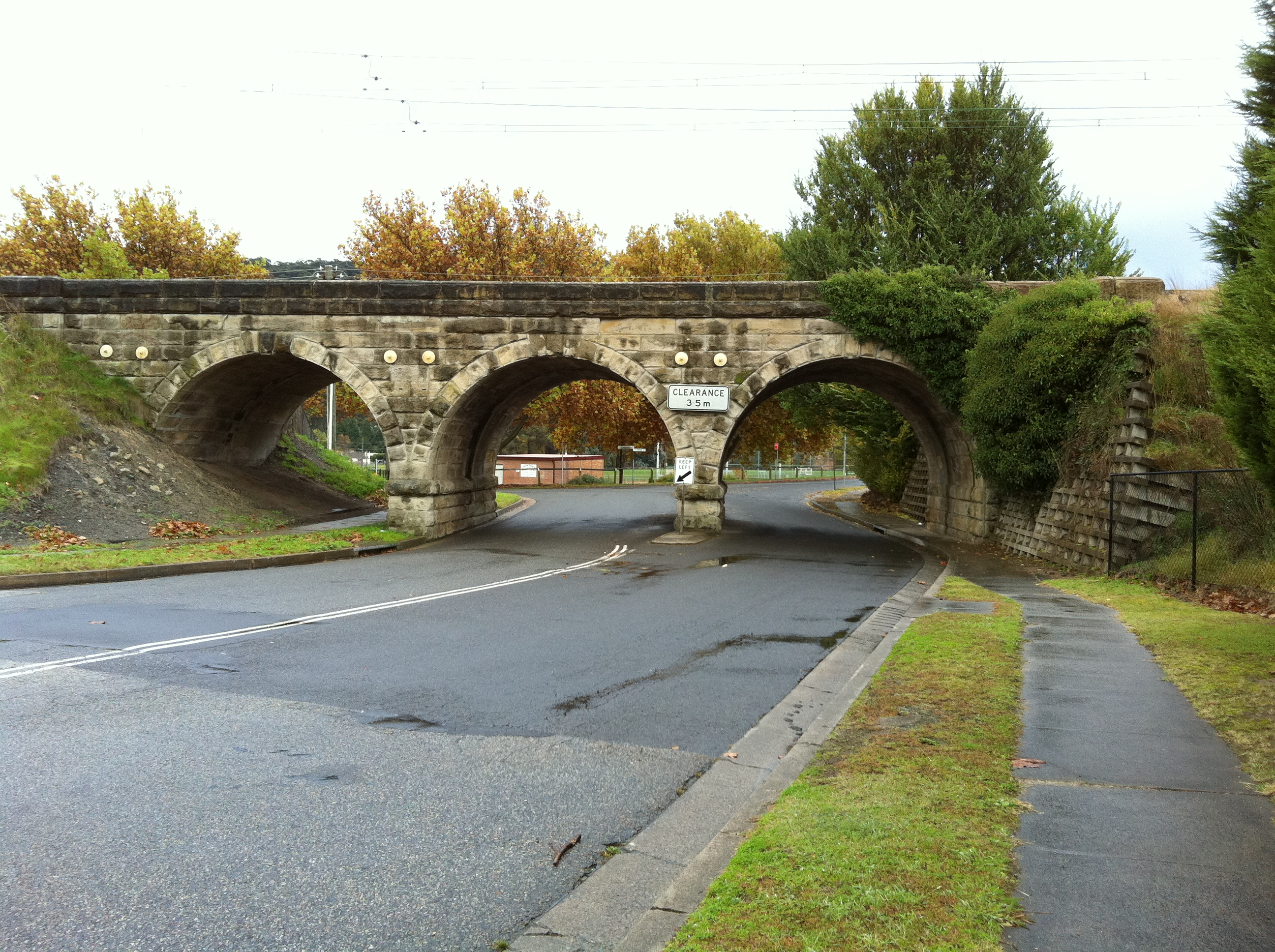
- The underbridge, pictured in 2011
- Coordinates: 33°28′55″S 150°09′07″E
- Carries: Main West Line
- Crosses: James Street
- Locale: Lithgow, City of Lithgow, New South Wales, Australia
- Other name: Lithgow (James St) Underbridge
- Owner: Transport Asset Manager of New South Wales

Characteristics
- Design: Arch underbridge
- Material: Sandstone
- Pier construction: Stone; Concrete
- Longest span: 6.1 metres (20 ft)
- No. of spans: 3

Rail characteristics
- No. of tracks: 2
- Track gauge: 4 ft 8 1/2 in (1,435 mm) standard gauge

History
- Designer: John Whitton; Engineer-in-Chief for Railways
- Construction end: 1869

New South Wales Heritage Register
- Official name: Lithgow (James St) Underbridge
- Type: State heritage (built)
- Designated: 30 August 2013
- Reference no.: 1831
- Type: Railway Bridge/Viaduct
- Category: Transport – Rail
- Builders: P. Higgins

Location
- Interactive map of Lithgow Underbridge

The Lithgow Underbridge is a heritage-listed railway underbridge that carries the Main West Line over James Street, in Lithgow, in the City of Lithgow local government area of New South Wales, Australia. The bridge is located approximately 156 kilometres (97 mi) from Central railway station. The bridge was designed by John Whitton as the Engineer-in-Chief for Railways and was built in 1869 by contractor, P. Higgins. It is also known as Lithgow (James St) Underbridge. The property is owned by Transport Asset Manager of New South Wales, an agency of the Government of New South Wales. It was added to the New South Wales State Heritage Register on 30 August 2013.

== History ==
The Main West Railway Line runs from Granville to Bourke and was completed in 1885. By 1900 certain sections of John Whitton's single track railway network were operating at or near saturation, these included the famous Zig Zag near Lithgow, the Main West from Emu Plains right through to Bathurst, the Main South from Picton as far as Harden and the Main North between Maitland and Muswellbrook. Also, the metropolitan railways were congested by the combination of suburban and freight traffic. The Line was duplicated through Lithgow to Bowenfels in 1891 and then onto Wallerawang in 1922.

John Whitton chose to use stone arch construction when denied sufficient funds to use imported wrought iron girders. It is the second oldest railway arch bridge in New South Wales built for two tracks.

The James Street railway bridge was built in 1869 as part of the Lithgow to Bathurst railway extension, which was completed in 1875. Economic constraints forced Whitton to build the others on this line for single track. They were progressively bypassed by double track brick arch bridges but the bridge at James Street continues its original function.

== Description ==
Three span, double track, sandstone arch railway bridge with 6.1 metres (20 ft) clear central span between solid stone piers and abutments, with a low stone parapet. The arches are half circles in elevation with sandstone imposts at the junction of the arches and piers.

=== Condition ===
As at 19 October 2009, the bridge is in moderate condition with the following defects: several cracks and erosion in the stone arches, and parapets out-of-line with missing mortar.

The James St Underbridge is of high integrity, retaining its original fabric in a good condition.

=== Modifications and dates ===
Anchors in spandrel walls added. Concrete retaining wall adjacent.

== Heritage listing ==
As at 9 October 2009, the James St Underbridge is significant as the second oldest stone arch railway bridge in New South Wales still in use. The bridge was designed by John Whitton, Engineer-in-Chief for the railways between 1856 and 1890, and is one of the only Whitton designed bridges remaining in use on the Main West Line. John Whitton has been described as the "Father of New South Wales Railways", responsible for the establishment of the basic framework of the NSW rail network. The bridge forms part of the larger historic Lithgow railway corridor, and exemplifies the style and technique used in construction of stone arch bridges, a form of construction which is relatively rare within the NSW rail network.

Lithgow Underbridge was listed on the New South Wales State Heritage Register on 30 August 2013 having satisfied the following criteria.

The place is important in demonstrating the course, or pattern, of cultural or natural history in New South Wales.

The James St Underbridge has historical significance as the second oldest stone arch railway bridge in New South Wales still in use, and as one of the only original Whitton-era bridges still in use along the Main West Line.

The place has a strong or special association with a person, or group of persons, of importance of cultural or natural history of New South Wales's history.

The James St Underbridge has associative significance as it was designed by John Whitton, Engineer-in-Chief for Railways between 1856 and 1890. When Whitton was denied funds to continue with bridge construction using the expensive, imported wrought iron girder bridges, he chose to use stone arch viaducts for his major bridge works. The James Street bridge is a typical example.

The place is important in demonstrating aesthetic characteristics and/or a high degree of creative or technical achievement in New South Wales.

The James St Underbridge has aesthetic significance as it exemplifies the style and technique used in construction of stone arch bridges, in a form highly representative of railway construction.

The place possesses uncommon, rare or endangered aspects of the cultural or natural history of New South Wales.

The stone construction of James St Underbridge is a comparatively rare technique within the NSW rail network.

The place is important in demonstrating the principal characteristics of a class of cultural or natural places/environments in New South Wales.

The James St Underbridge is representative of railway viaduct construction.

== See also ==
- List of railway bridges in New South Wales
