= Blacksmiths Festival =

Cultural event

Blacksmiths Festival is an annual blacksmith festival held in Ivano-Frankivsk, Ukraine

The festival is one of a number of cultural events that occur in Ivano-Frankivsk and contributed to the city winning the 2018 PACE Europe Prize. The festival was founded by Sergij Polbotko (Ukrainian Union of Blacksmith Artists).

== See also ==
- Ironfest (Lithgow)
