= Wambool old-rail truss overbridges =

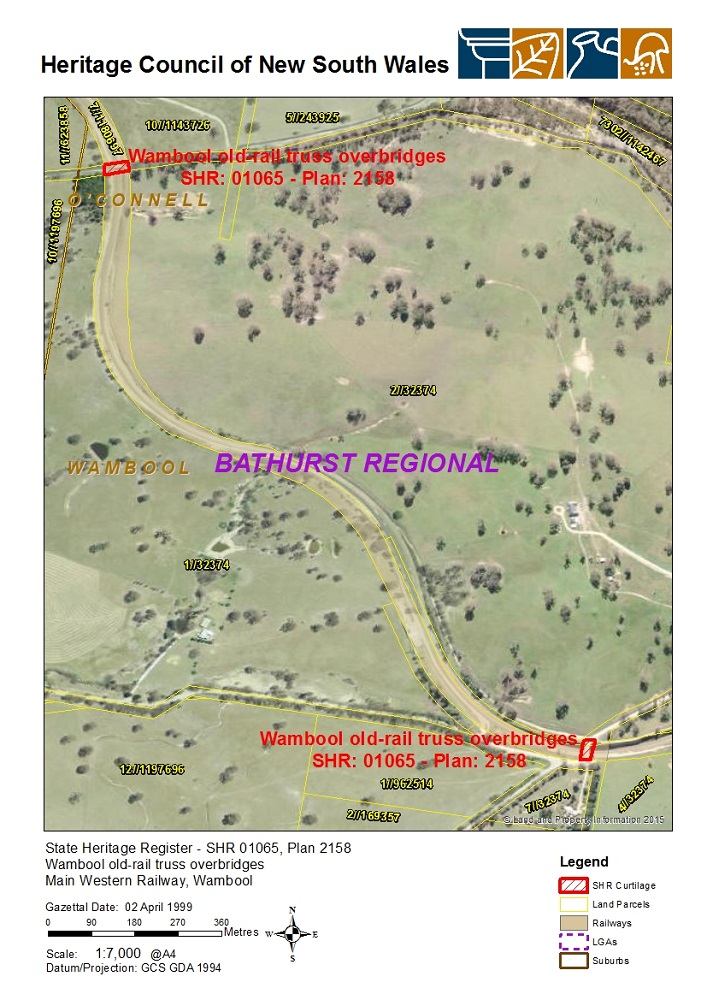
- Heritage boundaries with both bridges marked in red
- Coordinates: 33°30′07″S 149°44′54″E
- Crosses: Main Western line
- Locale: Wambool, Bathurst Region, New South Wales, Australia
- Owner: Transport Asset Manager of New South Wales

Characteristics
- Design: Pratt truss
- Material: Steel
- Pier construction: Brick
- Longest span: 24 metres (79 ft) (Wambool Road); 15 metres (49 ft) (Tarana-O'Connell Road)
- No. of spans: One span for each bridge

Rail characteristics
- No. of tracks: 2
- Track gauge: 4 ft 8 1/2 in (1,435 mm) standard gauge

History
- Construction end: 1896

New South Wales Heritage Register
- Official name: Wambool old-rail truss overbridges
- Type: State heritage (built)
- Designated: 2 April 1999
- Reference no.: 1065
- Type: Road Bridge
- Category: Transport – Land

Location
- Interactive map of Wambool old-rail truss overbridges

The Wambool old-rail truss overbridges are two heritage-listed railway bridges on the Main Western line in Wambool, Bathurst Region, New South Wales, Australia. It was built in 1896. The property is owned by Transport Asset Manager of New South Wales, an agency of the Government of New South Wales. It was added to the New South Wales State Heritage Register on 2 April 1999.

== History ==
Constructed in 1896 over a single-span line but to spans ready for duplication which occurred in 1916.

== Description ==
Two old-rail Pratt truss overbridges (vehicular bridges over a rail line) either side of Wambool. One bridge is located approximately 218 kilometres (135 mi) from Central railway station and carries the Wambool Road with a span of 24 metres (80 ft). The other bridge is located approximately 220 kilometres (140 mi) from Central and carries the Tarana-O'Connell Road with a span of 15 metres (49 ft). Both bridges are constructed of steel with brick abutments.

=== Condition ===
As at 20 March 2006, the physical condition is good.

== Heritage listing ==
As at 20 March 2006, the two old-rail Pratt overbridges that are good examples of bridge construction from the period of reconstruction of the line from Lithgow. Constructed in 1896 they represent the two major forms of bridge construction, steel and brick.

Wambool old-rail truss overbridges was listed on the New South Wales State Heritage Register on 2 April 1999 having satisfied the following criteria.

The place possesses uncommon, rare or endangered aspects of the cultural or natural history of New South Wales.

This pair of bridges are the only two old-rail Pratt truss overbridges in New South Wales.

== See also ==
- List of railway bridges in New South Wales
- Historic bridges of New South Wales
