= Ironfest (Lithgow) =

Festival in New South Wales, Australia

Ironfest is an historical and cultural event in Portland, New South Wales, created by Macgregor Ross, a local artist and festival director. It is a not-for-profit event that celebrates the relationship between humanity and iron, steel and other metals. Hosted as a series of events combined under one large theme, celebrating the cultural heritage and diversity of the Lithgow region, it brings together artists, designers/makers, blacksmiths, performers of all kinds, musicians, historical re-enactors, machine enthusiasts and hobbyists from all over Australia, and the world.

The last time Ironfest took place was in 2019. In March 2020 it was cancelled (just 4 weeks out) due to Covid, and there hasn't been a festival since. Plans, however, are now well under way to hold the first post-Covid event at its new home the Foundations in Portland, over the weekend of April 27 & 28, 2024

== History ==
Ironfest was first held in April 2000 to celebrate the 100-year anniversary of the birth of steel in Australia, which occurred in Lithgow, New South Wales. Since that time Ironfest has taken out numerous cultural, tourism and business awards, and has been acclaimed as a unique regional cultural experience.

It originally consisted of an exhibition of metal sculpture, paintings and drawings accompanied by blacksmith demonstrations by artist Harry Piers, and metal music by local band, The Mullpigs. Around 25 artists participated in this first event which was held at Blast Furnace Park in Lithgow.

In 2002 and 2003, it was held at the State Mine Museum, before moving in 2004 to the Lithgow Showground.

In 2007 Ironfest was recognized by the NSW government as an event of State significance, recognizing the valuable economic contribution that the event makes to the local Blue Mountains Central West NSW region.

Each year, it has grown on average by 20% both in terms of participants and visitors. In 2008 it involved close to 700 participants and attracted over 10,000 visitors. In 2009, it involved slightly more participants and again attracted in excess of 10,000 people.

In 2011 the theme for Ironfest was Steampunk which attracted a large new audience from the inner city suburbs of Sydney.

The festival went virtual in 2020 due to the COVID-19 pandemic

Ironfest 2024, refocussing on metal art and handmade products, is due to be held at the Foundations in Portland over the weekend of April 27 & 28 (hrs 10 - 5 Sat & 10 - 4 Sun)

== Gallery ==
Lithgow Ironfest 2005

Lithgow Ironfest 2008
