= Eskbank railway station, New South Wales =

Eskbank railway station
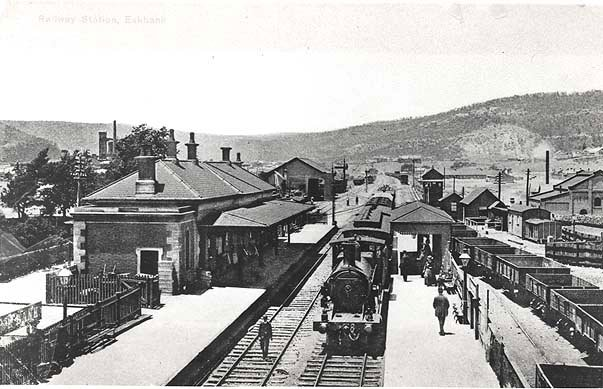
- Eskbank railway station, c. 1900

- Location within New South Wales Location within Australia
- 33°28′44″S 150°09′49″E
- Location: Main Western Line, Lithgow, City of Lithgow, New South Wales, Australia

History
- Built: 1882

Site notes
- Architects: John Whitton; New South Wales Government Railways
- Architectural style: Victorian Italianate
- Owner: Transport Asset Holding Entity

New South Wales Heritage Register
- Official name: Eskbank Railway Station group; Lithgow Goods Station/ Lithgow Site S1
- Type: State heritage (complex / group)
- Designated: 2 April 1999
- Reference no.: 1138
- Type: Railway Platform/ Station
- Category: Transport – Rail
- Builders: Goodsell & Wright (station building)

The Eskbank railway station is a heritage-listed former railway station and locomotive depot on the Main Western Line at Lithgow, New South Wales, Australia. It was designed by the New South Wales Government Railways and the station building was built by contractor Goodsell & Wright. The property was added to the New South Wales State Heritage Register on 2 April 1999, with the listing alternatively describing the site as Eskbank Railway Station group and Lithgow Goods Station/ Lithgow Site S1. It is now used as a venue for community groups.

== History ==
The Great Western Railway opened through Lithgow in 1869. As part of the rail construction a road overbridge was erected at Bells Line of Road (now called Bridge Street) at Eskbank. This was the first road overpass to be built outside Sydney. It was completed on 18 October 1869 and is one of the oldest surviving overbridges on the NSW railway system. It was modified in the 1880s when the line was duplicated and modified further when the deck width was increased to accommodate modern road traffic. The latter modifications can be seen in the brick extensions to the abutments on the Down side.

In 1875 a private stopping place was developed, near Coal Stage Hill (close to the site of the former Eskbank Locomotive Depot), for the use of Thomas Brown, owner of the property called Eskbank. This stopping place was originally called 'Brown's Siding'. The name was changed to Esk Bank in August 1876.

The new Eskbank Station was opened on 1 March 1882 following the duplication of the Western Line through Lithgow in October 1880. Two side platforms were erected but only a shelter was erected on the Bourke-bound platform. The present brick and stone structure on the Sydney-bound platform was opened for the duplication.

Eskbank played a role in the extensive trials which were undertaken during the 1880s and 1890s to ascertain the most suitable types of locomotives to be used for the haulage of freight and passengers on the Blue Mountains line. One of the most significant of these trials was the comparative assessment of the British built 373 class locomotive against the American 304 class which took place in 1887. These trials established the dominance of the American design features, which were to influence locomotive acquisitions in NSW for several decades.

The small, cramped Eskbank Locomotive Depot opened in 1882 and operated until 1915 when a new locomotive depot was established about one kilometre further to the east. It existed principally to stable and service locomotives operating between Eskbank and Sydney, Eskbank and Bathurst, and Eskbank and Mudgee. It was home to locomotives which provided assistance to trains on the steep grades of the Lithgow Zig Zag, and also to locomotives that operated the many industrial and colliery sidings in the Lithgow Valley. The new loco site to the east contained a 60-foot turntable, provision for two round houses, an engine shed, stores and coal loading ramps. In addition to these structures the depot had an enginemen's barracks situated at the north-west entrance to the depot site. Archaeological remains of the 1880s locomotive shed are extant.

The goods shed at Eskbank was also erected in 1882 and its "through" design provides some evidence to a notion that it had been relocated from Wallerawang. There is an open loading platform on the west end where the first goods loading crane once stood. Parts of this platform were originally enclosed on part of the building, but the extent is not clear. The current awning was constructed c.1960 when an earlier awning was removed. The goods shed suffered a major fire in 1996. Some timber roof framing members and parts of the roof sheeting were damaged and subsequently repaired. The shed was reduced in length at this time and one timber door was salvaged and stored in the building as a spare.

The yard also features a small workshop/ gangshed c. 1940; a 18-tonne (20-short-ton) Avery "cart" weighbridge and shed c. 1950; a gantry crane (TC707) c. 1960; and a "stiff-legged" or "tripod" crane (T499) c. 1940. There is a tank and water column south of the Inch Street bridge, thought to have been re-located in the 1990s. The items were transferred from Tarana and have no relationship to their current site where no watering facilities have stood before. The site also contains a number of ground level and sub-ground relics relating to past site activities and in particular steam railway activities. They include remains of the horse dock, loading banks, tracks and points and communications structures.

The signal box at Eskbank was opened in the same year and is the oldest signal box in use in NSW. It was built as a component of the provision of new passenger and goods facilities for Lithgow in the first half of the 1880s. It was a standard design of the period.

An overline coal stage was provided at Lithgow Coal Stage Box enabling engines to take coal on both main lines without detaching from their trains. The impending electrification to Bowenfels in 1957 saw the need for this facility greatly diminished and it was demolished, possibly prior to electrification to reduce the interaction between falling coal and the overhead wiring.

For more than four decades Eskbank was the centre of railway activities in the Lithgow Valley, and for steam operations in and out of the Valley. Trains started or terminated their journeys at Eskbank and through-trains were timed to stop there. However its importance waned in 1925 with the construction of Lithgow Station about 1 kilometre to the west. The new station was constructed in response to local agitation to establish one central station rather than to persist with two stations so close together. All buildings associated with the Locomotive Depot were removed from the site following the depot closure, and the turntable was relocated to Coolah.

The station was closed for passenger use in 1925 when the present Lithgow station was opened. Eskbank became the Lithgow Goods Depot and Station Master's headquarters from the mid-1920s until the 1980s. Since that time it has served as a depot for railway maintenance activities in the district.

The Eskbank platform building remained in use as an office for track staff until it was vacated c. 2005 and a lease for the premises was taken out by the State Mine Railway.

== Description ==
The complex comprises the following buildings and structures:

- Main Station Building (1882)
- Down Platform Shelter (c. 1890)
- Workshop/ Gang Shed (c. 1940)
- Weigh Bridge and Shed - 20 ton, post war (c. 1950s)
- Goods Shed (c. 1940, c. 1996)
- Yard Signal Box, type E, timber elevated (1885)
- Up Platform (c. 1882)
- Down Platform (c. 1890)
- Bridge Street Overbridge (1869)
- Culvert
- Tank and Water Column
- Former pedestrian entrance ramp
- Yard Crane- T499, (c. 1950/60s)
- Horse Dock, (c. 1882)
- Former Locomotive Depot including Gantry Crane (7 tons)

=== Main station building, erected 1882 ===
External: The 1882 station building is a fine example of the design adopted by John Whitton for stations at significant locations along the western, southern and northern railway lines during the first decades of NSW railway construction and is an example of the Victorian Italianate style. The design is based on a simple pavilion with a pitched gable roof. The principal design features, such as chimneys, windows and doors are arranged symmetrically in the classical manner, reinforced by the use of stone cornices, quoins, architraves and base course in an otherwise brick masonry building. The main façade features a pronounced breakfront with a pedimented stone window bay with large-section, sandstone architraves and finely worked sandstone dentils under the cornice of the pediment. The sandstone window bay is made up of full sections of stone in the lintel and architraves with a finely detailed dentilled cornice. The brickwork is laid in red bricks in Flemish bond and tuckpointed with fine white joints.

The northern side of the station was the principal entrance in the original design. It features the central breakfront, with the fine sandstone bay window, and originally a pair of symmetrical verandahs that protected visitors entering the station via the general waiting room. The verandahs were removed from the northern façade, and the doorways that provided access from the verandahs to the general waiting room were bricked up.

The platform awning is timber framed with columns set back from the platform edge and a large cantilever, corrugated iron roof. The supports are ornate cast iron Corinthian columns and ornate cast iron cantilever brackets. The verandah is intact in its authentic form. The main roof of the station is a hipped gable with a short transverse hipped gable over the northern breakfront and a segment in the roof over the smaller, southern breakfront. The roof is sheeted with corrugated steel. The former west end wall of the building was demolished to create a larger room by the addition of a timber extension.

Internal: The original linear floor layout arrangement remains intact. The planning arrangement is typical. The large central room was the general waiting room adjoined by a booking office with two ticket windows. The room on the Down side of the general waiting room was the telegraph office. At the Down end there were two additional rooms; a parcels office and the porter's and lamp room. On the Up end there was a ladies' waiting room with an adjoining toilet. The men's toilet and urinals were accessible from the platform. The function of the rooms changed following the conversion of the station to the goods depot and Station Master's headquarters. The traditional interior finishes are mostly plain including timber-boarded floors; plain plastered walls and ceilings; timber boarded ceilings in minor spaces and painted timber moulded joinery. These finishes remain largely intact although damaged by years of use and lack of maintenance. Fireplaces have been boarded up and the toilets fittings are relatively recent with tile wall cladding and flooring.

=== Down platform shelter, erected c. 1890 ===
The shelter is built in a style to match the main station building. It features plain stretcher bond brickwork on the brick and stone platform base with a low-pitched hip gable roof with corrugated iron or steel sheeting. It was built with two small, enclosed rooms with an open area between. The walls of the two rooms were subsequently demolished and the whole structure was altered to be entirely open on the trackside with a single solid wall on only the south side.

=== Workshop / Gang shed, erected c. 1940 ===
External: It is a simple timber-framed, gable roofed structure with corrugated steel roof sheeting and unpainted cliplock profile steel wall cladding that stands on the north-western side of the former station forecourt.

Internal: The interior is plain unlined and there are timber storage racks, generally relocated or reused items. There is evidence that the building was extended at the southwest end at some stage. The upturned edge on the concrete slab floor continues across the space and has evidence of external cladding.

=== Weighbridge and shed, erected c. 1950s ===
The AVERY 18-tonne (20-short-ton) weighbridge was made by W&T; Avery of Birmingham, England, and dates from the post war period. The scales were probably not enclosed originally but are now protected by a small structure clad with asbestos cement sheeting in a 1950s style. The scales are not extant.

=== The Goods Shed, erected c. 1940s, modifications in c. 1990s ===
Standard timber-framed, corrugated steel clad through goods shed with an elevated timber loading deck on the northern side with large timber sliding doors on the northern façade. A modern concrete platform has recently been built north of the loading dock where there would originally have been road vehicle access. There is an open loading platform on the west end where the first goods loading crane once stood. The current awning was constructed c. 1960 when an earlier awning was removed. The goods shed suffered a major fire in 1996. Some timber roof framing members and parts of the roof sheeting were damaged and subsequently repaired and the shed was reduced in length at this time.

=== Yard signal box, erected 1885 ===
External: A small relatively square shaped and elevated timber framed traditional signal box of early standard design with a gabled corrugated iron roof with cantilevered iron awnings above the windows. The walls are clad with rusticated timber weatherboards and the gable bargeboards are in the form of decorative scalloped shapes with timber turned finials. The sliding windows are small multi-paned and timber framed and sashed and the first floor landing containing a toilet is cantilevered on cast iron decorative brackets. Access to the signal control room is by a recent steel staircase. It is located on the Down side near the Eskbank Station.

Internal: Internally the walls and ceiling are clad with flat beaded edge lining boards. The signal and point control lever mechanism of 24 levers remain, of which 16 are still in use. The lever operations have been sympathetically adapted in some cases to operate the contemporary power light signals and associated track points while a number of them still operate mechanically to serve the nearby sidings. On the walls are fitted the original track diagrams and a number of signal tools extant.

=== Platforms, Up Platform erected c. 1882, Down Platform erected c. 1890 ===
The main station building (Up) platform is brick faced with bitumen paving and concrete deck. It has been secured by wire mesh and pipe fencing along the rail side. The Down platform is brick faced with projecting stone edge and aggregate surface. It extends as a ramp on one side.

=== Former locomotive depot and gantry crane ===
Originally located to the east of the station site, on the Up side, and consisting of a sixty-foot Sellars turntable and a three-road, timber-framed, corrugated iron-clad engine shed with a central ventilating ridge and separate smoke chutes over each road. Each of the three roads contained an inspection and servicing pit. The locomotive coaling facilities were located to the east of the locomotive depot on the site that is now called Coal Stage Hill. Watering facilities were located at the south-west corner of the depot, adjacent to the Main Western Railway Line. The gantry crane TC707 may have been installed in the 1960s. The only physical remains of the depot are water tank and building footings, pipes and the servicing and turntable pits. These had been filled with ash and partly covered with soil. The turntable pit has a sandstone coping.

=== The Bridge Street overbridge, erected 1869 ===
The overbridge is constructed of rusticated sandstone abutments and a plate iron deck. The modern concrete bridge deck on iron girders was constructed in 1957 to accommodate the overhead wiring when the line was electrified. The eastern abutments are believed to be substantially as-built while the southern abutments were reconstructed or encased within new brickwork to accommodate widening for modern road traffic requirements. The bridge has an open chainmesh balustrade and pipe railing, which replaced original low stone parapet.

=== Tank and water column ===
Located to the south of the Inch Street bridge at a new platform and thought to have been re-located in the 1990s. The items were transferred from Tarana and have little significance to their current site where no watering facilities have stood before.

=== Other structures ===
The overhead wiring portals and masts are simple unpainted steel structures that presumably date from the late 1950s. The overhead wiring is modern. These are minor structures that are generic to the railway environment and not specific to the site. There is a single white painted semaphore signal mast on the Down side of the Down track at the Sydney end of the Down platform. This might be the same as formerly located directly opposite on the Up side.

=== Yard crane, erected c. 1950 ===
A type 2 tripod crane No.T499 and is an example of the last type of tripod crane made of welded steel on a concrete base.

=== Horse dock, erected c. 1882 ===
Timber frame dock with timber post supports at the corners and sides with additional steel posts for strength. It is located near the yard crane.

=== Moveable items ===
Apart from one extant cast iron bubbler on the main Platform there are no known moveable items within the Eskbank Railway Precinct.

=== Landscape features ===
The site is generally in the form of an industrial area with a large number of remnant structures, bitumen parking areas and sidings associated with the early station and goods yard activities. Landscaping consists of overgrown garden, trees and shrubs of the surrounding sites around the perimeters.

=== Potential archaeological features ===
The archaeological remains of the locomotive depot may exist however; they have moderate technical significance for their connection to the evaluation and adaptation of comparative British and American technologies which took place in the 1880s and 1890s. The site also contains a number of ground level and sub-ground relics relating to past site activities and in particular steam railway activities. They include remains of loading banks, tracks and points and communications structures. The turntable pit has a sandstone coping that is rare and possibly the only remaining example of its type. It has not been modified since the 1920s.

=== Condition ===
- Station Building: Moderate. The masonry elements of the station building are generally sound although there is some deterioration in the decorative stonework quoins and dressings and surface soiling on the platform façade. The major cause of deterioration of the station building is the entry of water into the footings and sub-floor spaces. This comes from overland flows from the carpark and from downpipes which discharge onto the ground. The problem is exacerbated by raised ground levels, the demolition of the north verandahs and the installation of concrete slabs in some rooms. This has caused rising damp and associated salt attack of the stonework and encouraged termite infestation and related damage in the western addition.
- Down Platform Shelter: Moderate
- Workshop/Gang Store: Moderate
- Weighbridge and Shed: Good-Moderate
- Goods Shed: Moderate
- Yard SB: The condition of the building and equipment is good and have high archaeological potential.
- Locomotive Depot: Moderate to Poor
- Work is required to stabilise the masonry of the archaeological remains relaying loose and dislodged bricks and stone in lime mortar, preserving timber and metals and adjusting ground levels and clearing drains to ensure site drainage is functioning.
- Yard Crane: Good condition.

The Eskbank station building is largely intact and the precinct retains many of the original structures on site, including one of the oldest goods sheds in the State. The signal box retains a high level of intactness, and its integrity is excellent due to its operational status.

=== Modifications and dates ===
- c. 1900: Down Platform Shelter walls demolished and the whole structure altered
- c. 1922: Slate roof replaced with corrugated steel on station building
- 1957: Yard SB signal system partially adapted for electric light signals.
- 1996: Some timber frame elements and roof sheeting replaced in goods shed following a major fire
- c. 2000s: Minor internal modifications to station building for new use .
- N.d: Various minor changes, most of which have been removed since 1960.

Locomotive Depot: All buildings were removed from the site following the depot closure, and the turntable was relocated to Coolah. The yard was subsequently used for other railway purposes with further lines and structures.

== Heritage listing ==
As at 26 October 2010, The Eskbank Railway Precinct is of state significance as an early railway precinct, important in the course of NSW's history due to its key role in the industrial development of the Lithgow Valley. It was the first railway yard and locomotive depot in the Lithgow Valley and served as a major locomotive depot through the 1880s boom, the 1890s depression and the Federation era. Eskbank Railway Precinct is of further significance as the terminating place of locomotive trials undertaken in the 1880s and 1890s, which evaluated the technologies and design principles which were to influence locomotive design in New South Wales until the close of the steam era. The Eskbank station and the nearby remains of the locomotive depot, branch line and associated infrastructure demonstrate a class of first generation railway places. The site was established within the context of other economic and industrial developments including mining, housing, transportation of goods to Sydney and greater NSW, and it is from these that it draws its greater significance. The precinct retains most of the original structures including one of the oldest goods sheds in the State; however, the demolition of all above ground locomotive depot structures in the 1920s has compromised the overall value of the place.

Eskbank Railway Precinct is of aesthetic significance as a fine example of the first stations built on the NSW railway system. The station building is aesthetically significant as an example of a Victorian Italianate style station building utilising tuck pointed brickwork to the body of the wall and classically detailed stone quoins, cornices and a pedimented bay window. The masonry details and Victorian ironwork was both functional and decorative and was a forerunner to the next generation of grander stations in NSW.

The Eskbank station building is of state heritage significance as a largely intact example of the simple, classically inspired, masonry station building type introduced by John Whitton in the 1860s. Its history is closely associated with an area that is sometimes referred to as the cradle of Australian industry. As such it has a high level of significance due to its association with important developments in transport, technology and industry. The goods shed and the remains of the locomotive depot contribute to the overall value of the place, as well as the link to the State Mine site.

Eskbank Railway Precinct has research significance as a railway yard with varying buildings and infrastructure that remain partly intact and as an example of traditional country railway station yards in New South Wales. The weighbridge, yard crane, horse dock, gantry crane, two major bridges and the branch line contribute to the significance of the precinct. The archaeological remains of the locomotive depot have moderate technical significance for their connection to the evaluation and adaptation of comparative British and American technologies which took place in the 1880s and 1890s.

Lithgow Yard signal box is of state significance as a small and intact elevated signal box dating from 1885, and as the oldest operating in the state. The signal box retains most of the original equipment and still operates a number of original semaphore signals in the yard. It forms a classic 19th century railway structure in the historic Eskbank station yard. It is closely related to the early development of the Eskbank station precinct and branch colliery lines.

Eskbank railway station was listed on the New South Wales State Heritage Register on 2 April 1999 having satisfied the following criteria.

The place is important in demonstrating the course, or pattern, of cultural or natural history in New South Wales.
Eskbank Railway Precinct is of historical significance as an important place in the railway history of New South Wales and Lithgow. It was the first railway yard and locomotive depot in the Lithgow Valley and served as a major locomotive depot through the 1880s boom, the 1890s depression and the era of Federation. Eskbank Railway Precinct has high significance as the terminating place of locomotive trials undertaken in the 1880s and 1890s, which evaluated the technologies and design principles which were to influence locomotive design in New South Wales until the close of the steam era.
Eskbank Railway Precinct has high significance for its association with the state mining and industrial developments within the Lithgow Valley from the 1870s until the 1920s. The precinct played an important role in housing, maintaining and servicing the locomotives which operated on the railway lines in the Lithgow Valley and that transported goods to Sydney and greater NSW.
Lithgow Yard Signal Box is of historical significance as the oldest known surviving railway signal box in NSW remaining in near original condition with most of its equipment dating back to 1884. It is closely related to the early development of the Eskbank Station Precinct and branch colliery lines.

The place has a strong or special association with a person, or group of persons, of importance of cultural or natural history of New South Wales's history.
Eskbank Railway Precinct is of significance for its association with John Whitton, Engineer-in-Chief of the NSW Railways, and his colleagues and successors. Eskbank Station is one of the now small number of purpose-built railway stations introduced by John Whitton for a then new function.

The place is important in demonstrating aesthetic characteristics and/or a high degree of creative or technical achievement in New South Wales.
Eskbank Railway Precinct is of aesthetic significance as a fine example of the first stations built on the NSW railway system. The station building is aesthetically significant as an example of a Victorian Italianate style station building utilising tuckpointed brickwork to the body of the wall and classically detailed stone quoins, cornices and a pedimented bay window. The masonry details and Victorian ironwork was both functional and decorative and was a forerunner to the next generation of grander stations in NSW. Eskbank has significance as a relatively intact railway station that has more or less survived in the form it was in the 1920s. Lithgow Yard signal box is of aesthetic significance as an excellent and intact example of the traditional smaller timber elevated signal boxes.

The place has a strong or special association with a particular community or cultural group in New South Wales for social, cultural or spiritual reasons.
Eskbank Railway Precinct has social significance as an important site in the social history of Lithgow up to the 1920s. The place is now held in high esteem by the rail heritage groups, local council and volunteers who continue to be associated with the site and promote its conservation.

The place has potential to yield information that will contribute to an understanding of the cultural or natural history of New South Wales.
Eskbank Railway Precinct has research significance as a railway yard with varying buildings and infrastructure that remain partly intact and as an example of traditional country railway station yards in New South Wales. The weighbridge, yard crane, horse dock, gantry crane, two major bridges and the branch line contribute to the significance of the precinct.
The signal box has a high level of both technical and research potential for its ability to demonstrate characteristics and design requirements of standard elevated timber boxes of the 1880s as well as changing technology in the signalling system.
The archaeological remains of the locomotive depot have moderate technical significance for their connection to the evaluation and adaptation of comparative British and American technologies which took place in the 1880s and 1890s. The challenge of moving freight across the rugged Blue Mountains and through the demanding zig zags from Eskbank to Penrith led local engineers into a worldwide search for steam engineering solutions, which were tested between Sydney and Eskbank. The results of the trials were then translated into purchasing and design decisions which led to the creation of Australian locomotives which were an amalgam of British and American design and construction principles.

The place possesses uncommon, rare or endangered aspects of the cultural or natural history of New South Wales.
The Eskbank Railway Precinct has rarity significance for its collection of distinctive railway buildings and infrastructure. The goods shed has significance as an early, albeit altered, example of a through-shed and is one of only a few of its type that remain in the Metropolitan area. The Down platform structure has significance as an early and rare platform shelter. The locomotive depot is an archaeological site with remnants of a turntable pit that has been rimmed with sandstone coping. This gives the pit some significance, as it is possibly the only remaining pit of this type. The yard signal box is one of the oldest in NSW and one of only six similar boxes remaining in the State.

The place is important in demonstrating the principal characteristics of a class of cultural or natural places/environments in New South Wales.
The Eskbank Railway Precinct is of representative significance as one of a large number of purpose built railway stations in NSW built in the period of intense activity between the early 1860s and the late 1880s. It is a representative example of the first group of linear station buildings built in a simple but elegant domestic style with some decorative elements in the Victorian Italianate style. The station building is representative of the John Whitton style and the yard layout is typical of the period. The signal box is a representative example of traditional timber elevated signal boxes of its design.
The substantial archaeological remains of the locomotive depot are representative of a medium-sized locomotive servicing depot of the 1880s. They and the branch line also represent the link between industrial and railway development. It is not considered to be rare as many other locomotive depots of this era survive in a far more complete state but it enhances the value of the overall site.

== See also ==
- List of disused railway stations in regional New South Wales
