= McKanes Falls Bridge =

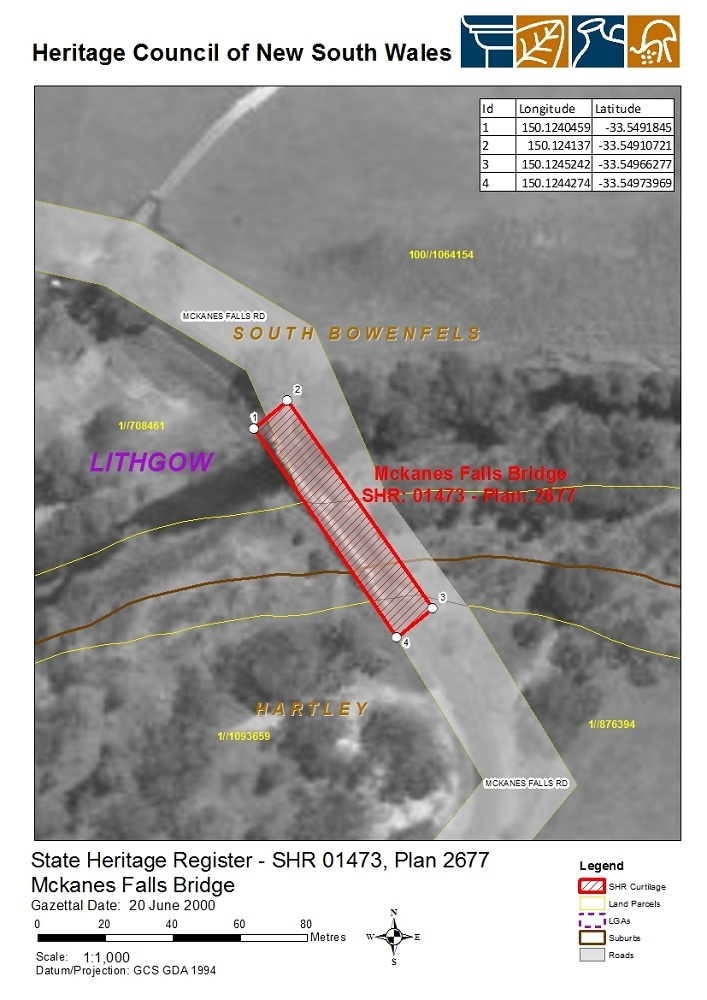
- Heritage boundaries
- Coordinates: 33°32′58″S 150°07′28″E
- Carries: McKanes Falls Road
- Crosses: Coxs River
- Locale: South Bowenfels, New South Wales, Australia
- Other name: McKanes Bridg
- Named for: Archibald McKane
- Owner: Transport for NSW

Characteristics
- Design: Truss bridge
- Material: Timber with sandstone abutments
- Trough construction: Concrete and stone
- Pier construction: Concrete
- Total length: 55 metres (180 ft)
- Width: 4.57 metres (15.0 ft)
- Longest span: 27 metres (90 ft)
- No. of spans: 2

History
- Engineering design by: John McDonald (NSW Engineer for Bridges)
- Construction start: 1892
- Construction end: 1893

New South Wales Heritage Register
- Official name: McKanes Falls Bridge; McKanes Bridge
- Type: State heritage (built)
- Designated: 20 June 2000
- Reference no.: 1473
- Type: Road Bridge
- Category: Transport – Land
- Builders: NSW Public Works

Location
- Interactive map of McKanes Falls Bridge

The McKanes Falls Bridge is a heritage-listed road bridge at McKanes Falls Road, South Bowenfels, New South Wales, Australia. It was designed by John McDonald and NSW Engineer for Bridges and built from 1892 to 1893 by NSW Public Works. It is also known as McKanes Bridge. The property is owned by Transport for NSW. It was added to the New South Wales State Heritage Register on 20 June 2000.

== History ==
The design of the McDonald Truss was greatly influenced by the needs of the time. During the period 1865-1885, the Public Works Department (PWD) was attempting to tap the resources of inland Australia and to redirect the line of trade from Melbourne to Sydney. To achieve this most funds were directed at the railways. As more people were moving to the rural areas it was necessary to link farms and towns to nearby railheads, with consequent road and bridge requirements. The McDonald Truss was designed by John A McDonald M.I.C.E. and was the answer to the need for more bridges, the technical faults of the old PWD design and limited funds. It is most probable that McKanes Falls, McKanes Crossing and McKanes Bridge are named after Archibald McKane. He was born in Edinburgh in 1807 and was trained as a joiner and ploughwright. He was convicted of cattle stealing in 1830 and transported to Australia for seven years. He was sentenced to another seven years for larceny in 1833. He was appointed as overseer of carpenters in the 1830s. He was involved in expeditions with Thomas Mitchell, and was commended for his duties as a carpenter. He was granted his certificate of freedom in 1844.

The road on which the bridge sits was built in the late 1870s to connect Bowenfels and Hampton. With the increase in road use in the early 1890s due to tourism at Jenolan Caves, but mainly farm production, especially wool, the road was upgraded and the bridge was built in 1893.

Tenders were called to erect a bridge over Coxs River in September 1891 and was under construction by 1892. The bridge was constructed to shorten the distance for traffic going from Bowenfels to Lowther, Hampton and Jenolan Falls. The earlier route had run via Hartley.

== Description ==
The bridge consists of two 27-metre (90 ft) truss spans supported at each end by sandstone masonry abutments. The centre pier was built as stone but replaced with a reinforced concrete pier in the 1980s following flood damage. The bridge is 4.57 metres (15.0 ft) between kerbs at its narrowest point. There is no footway. The deck is made up of lateral timber cross girders supporting longitudinal timber decking. The cross girders are bearing on the bottom chords of the trusses. The substructure consists of two sandstone abutments and a central concrete pier.

=== Condition ===
On 15 June 2005, the bridge was in good condition following major repairs carried out in the last few years. Elements of truss true to original design although most or all of the timbers have been replaced as part of routine maintenance as with other parts of the bridge. The central stone pier replaced with concrete pier.

=== Modifications and dates ===
- c. 1925 – brushbox decking laid
- 1934 – bridge screwed up
- 1941 – dismantling and erecting squared timber
- 1951-86 – repairs and maintenance
- 1986 – new reinforced concrete central pier replaced original stone pier after severe flooding.
- 1986 – a metal flashing has been placed over all top chords and principals to shed water. Regular maintenance by RTA.

== Heritage listing ==
On 15 June 2005, this bridge is a McDonald timber truss road bridge. Timber truss road bridges were extensively used in New South Wales because of the high quality of local hardwoods and the shortage of steel during the early decades of settlement of the state. The timber truss was highly developed for bridges in New South Wales, perhaps more so than anywhere else in the world at that time. The McDonald truss is a significant evolutionary link in the development of timber road bridges in New South Wales and has three standard span lengths, 20 metres (65 ft), 23 metres (75 ft), and 27 metres (90 ft). At March 1998 there were seven McDonald truss road bridges remaining in New South Wales, McKanes Falls Bridge being one of two with a 27.43-metre (90 ft) span and one of two in a double span configuration. The bridge has been assessed as having State significance.

McKanes Falls Bridge was listed on the New South Wales State Heritage Register on 20 June 2000 having satisfied the following criteria.

The place is important in demonstrating the course, or pattern, of cultural or natural history in New South Wales.

McDonald truss bridges have historical significance because timber truss bridges were developed and refined in Australia to achieve the highest level of timber bridge construction for the time of their design and the McDonald truss is an important recognisable design in the evolution of timber truss bridges in NSW. The bridge also has a historical link with the evolution of the local community. The probable association with Archibald McKane and his involvement with Mitchell's third expedition also lends some significance to the crossing itself. McKanes bridge is a relic of the NSW government's policies of the late nineteenth century which focused on the provision of land areas to facilitate an increase in production and trade throughout the state. Is associated with John A McDonald, designer of the McDonald Truss and a significant figure in the area of bridge design and construction in NSW.

The place is important in demonstrating aesthetic characteristics and/or a high degree of creative or technical achievement in New South Wales.

McDonald truss bridges have aesthetic significance because they are evocative of Australian methods of bridge construction, in their materials, scale and configuration they reflect and express nineteenth century technologies and experiences and for the time of their design and construction they demonstrate the best quality design available. The dark green painting and the valley setting complement the surrounding rural environment. McKanes Bridge is an excellent example of a twin span McDonald Truss type bridge The scale of the structure, the natural timber and other materials allow the bridge to meld with the surrounding landscape.

The place has a strong or special association with a particular community or cultural group in New South Wales for social, cultural or spiritual reasons.

McDonald truss bridges have social significance because their size and location contribute directly to the local area and they are a strong element in the local environment. McKanes Bridge is located in farming country and is isolated, with few residents nearby. For these reasons there is little contemporary community association. However, the bridge forms part of local school bus routes and consequently is well known to the children of the wider community. The bridge has been an important feature of one of the old routes to the Jenolan caves tourist area since its construction in 1893. Built to provide better access for traffic from Bowenfels to Lowther, Hampton and Jenolan Falls, it played a significant role for those people living, working and holidaying in the surrounding area.

The place possesses uncommon, rare or endangered aspects of the cultural or natural history of New South Wales.

One of six remaining McDonald truss bridges, one of two 27-metre (90 ft) span bridges. One of very few timber truss bridges remaining in the Lithgow area. The only surviving example of a twin span McDonald Truss road bridge in NSW and one of only five surviving in NSW and still in use.

The place is important in demonstrating the principal characteristics of a class of cultural or natural places/environments in New South Wales.

Representative example of a two span, 27-metre (90 ft) McDonald truss bridge. Representative of the first truss bridge design which can be considered uniquely Australian due to its local design and use of native timbers. Is an example of the design which led to a rapid expansion in bridge construction throughout NSW and an excellent example of a twin span McDonald Truss in good condition and easily accessible

== Engineering heritage award ==
The bridge received a Historic Engineering Marker from Engineers Australia as part of its Engineering Heritage Recognition Program.

== See also ==
- Historic bridges of New South Wales
- List of bridges in Australia
