= Bathurst, New South Wales =

Bathurst
- City
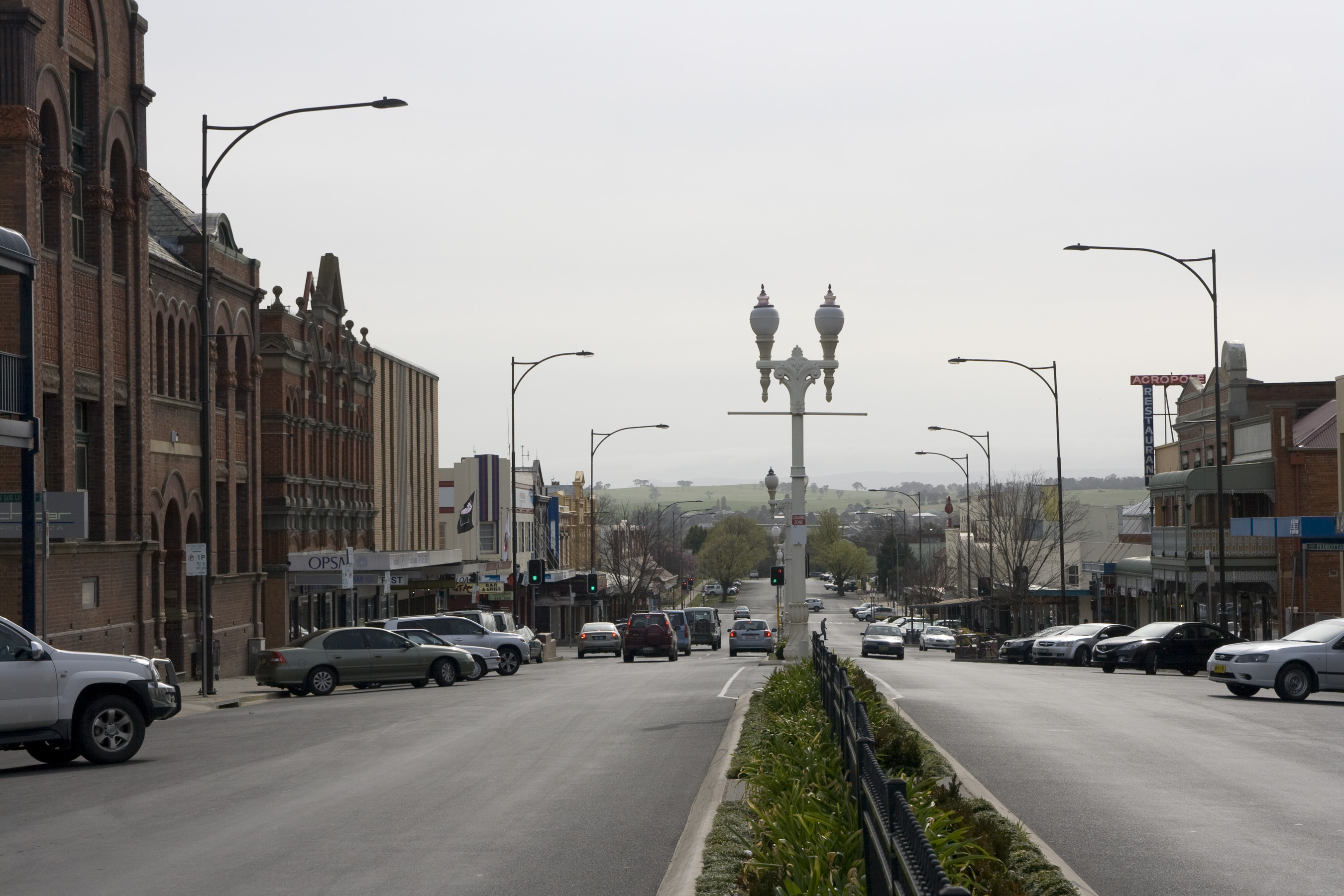
- William Street

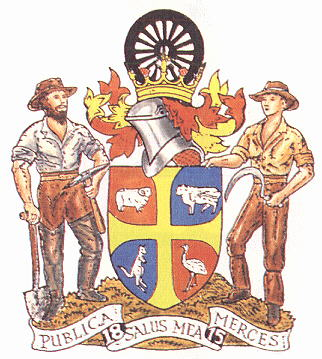

- Coordinates: 33°25′12″S 149°34′40″E
- Country: Australia
- State: New South Wales
- Region: Central West
- LGA: Bathurst Regional Council
- Location: 203 km (126 mi) WNW of Sydney; 60 km (37 mi) W of Lithgow; 55 km (34 mi) ESE of Orange; 186 km (116 mi) N of Goulburn; 280 km (170 mi) N of Canberra
- Established: 1814

Government
  - State electorate: Bathurst
  - Federal division: Calare
- Elevation: 650 m (2,130 ft)

Population
  - Total: 36,230 (UCL 2021)
- Postcode: 2795
- Mean max temp: 20.8 °C (69.4 °F)
- Mean min temp: 6.7 °C (44.1 °F)
- Annual rainfall: 647.8 mm (25.50 in)

Bathurst (/ˈbæθɜːrst/ BATH-erst, locally /ˈbæθəst/ BATH-əst) is a city in the Central Tablelands of New South Wales, Australia. It is about 200 kilometres (120 mi) west-northwest of Sydney and is the seat of the Bathurst Regional Council. Founded in 1815, Bathurst is the oldest inland settlement in Australia and had a population of 44,621 in 2023.

Bathurst is often referred to as the Gold Country, for the area was the site of Australia's first discovery of payable gold in 1851, and where Australia's first gold rush occurred. Today education, tourism and manufacturing drive the economy. The internationally known racetrack Mount Panorama is a landmark of the city which brings in a lot of tourism, especially during the week of the Bathurst 1000. Bathurst has a historic city centre, containing many ornate buildings remaining from the New South Wales gold rush in the mid-to-late 19th century.

== History ==
=== Wiradjuri ===
The area around what is now called Bathurst was originally occupied by the Muurrai clan of the Wiradjuri people. It was known as dalman or place of plenty. Yam fields were cultivated on the fertile floodplain and fire-stick farming was utilised to maintain grassy pasture for wild game. The Wiradjuri were noted by early colonists for their neat mandiyaba or possum-skin cloaks which were decorated with artistic etchings known as burwurr. British colonial settlement into this area began in 1815 and was expanded in 1818 when Governor Lachlan Macquarie removed restrictions that limited colonial settlements. Once these restrictions were removed the Wiradjuri people suffered major dislocation, death and disruption to their way of life.

=== Early British colonisation (1815–1850) ===
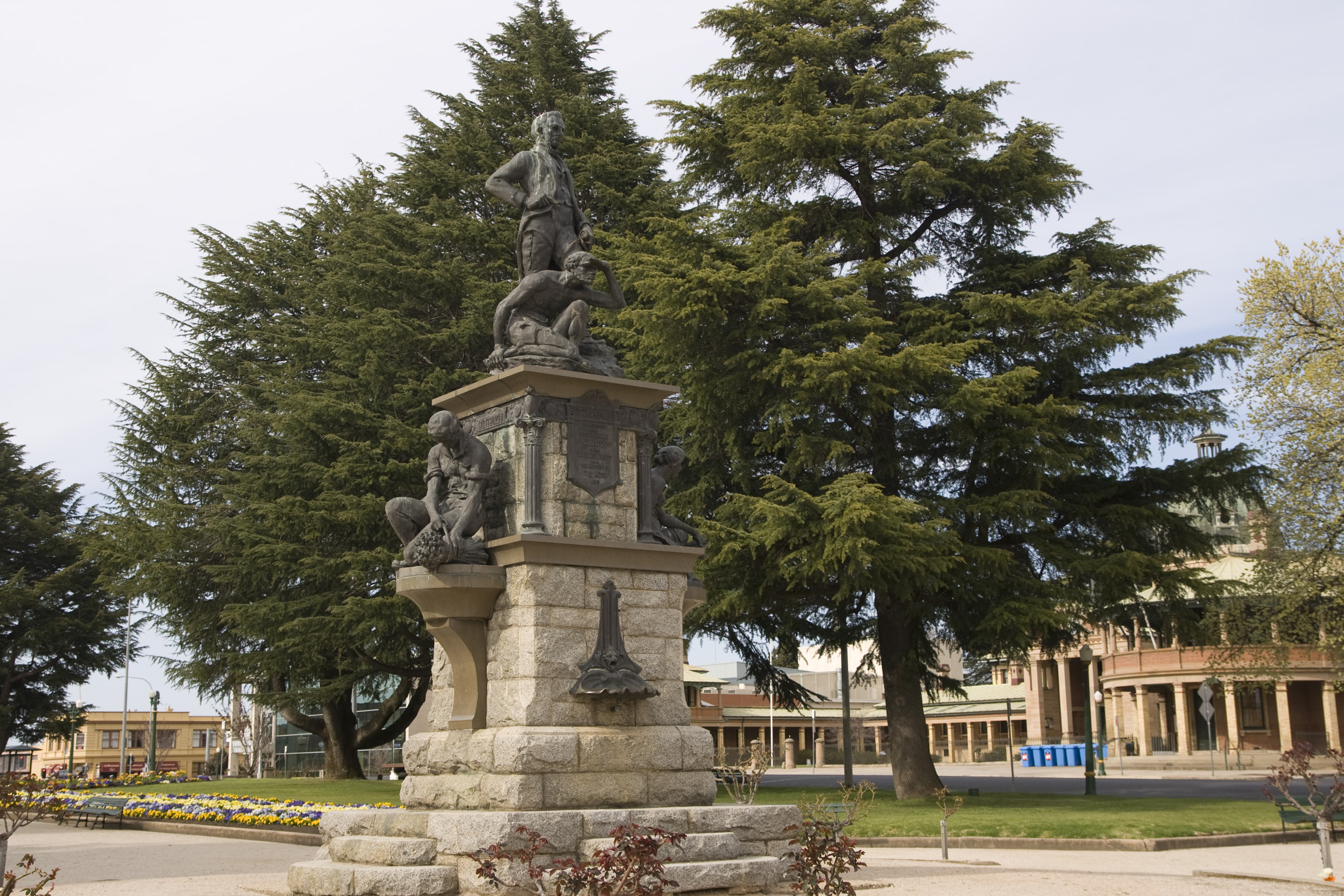
George Evans monument

The government surveyor, George Evans, was the first European to sight the Bathurst Plains in 1813, following the first successful British crossing of the Blue Mountains in the same year. In 1814, Governor Lachlan Macquarie approved an offer by William Cox to build a road crossing the Blue Mountains, from Emu Plains to the Bathurst Plains. This road was 3.7 metres (12 ft) wide and 163.3 kilometres (101 1/2 mi) long, built between 18 July 1814 and 14 January 1815 using 5 freemen, 30 convict labourers and 8 soldiers as guards. Twenty convicts and soldiers remained stationed at terminus of the road at the Bathurst Plains. These were the first non-Indigenous residents of what was to become Bathurst but was simply referred to until May 7 of that year as the Grand Depot. Governor Macquarie surveyed the finished road in April 1815, travelling along it to the Grand Depot with his wife and an entourage of 50 officials, soldiers and servants.

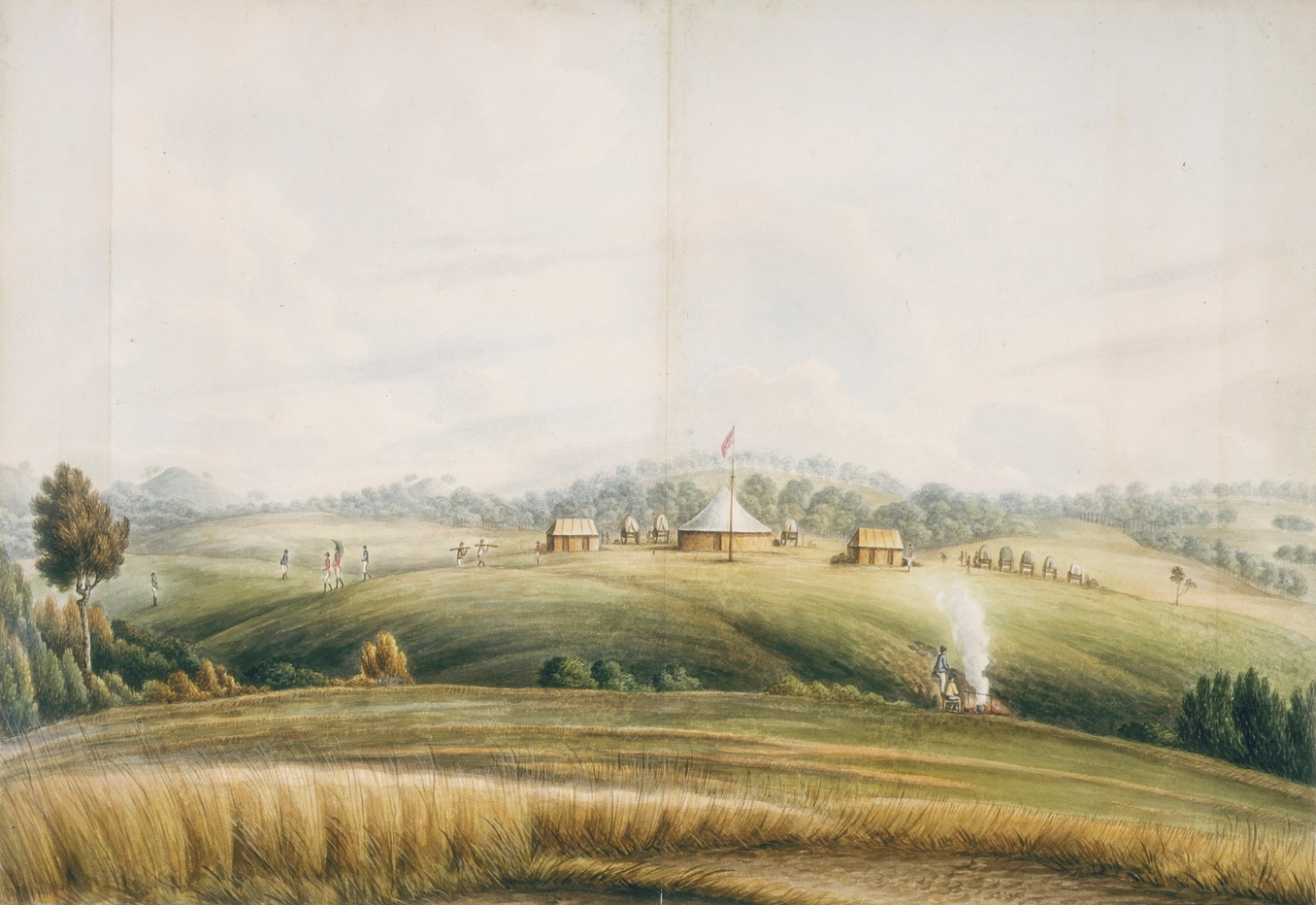
John Lewin, The Plains, Bathurst, watercolour drawing, ca. 1815

On 7 May 1815, Governor Macquarie raised the British flag at the Grand Depot, ordered a ceremonial volley to be fired and named the military outpost as Bathurst after the Secretary of State for War and the Colonies, Henry Bathurst, 3rd Earl Bathurst. Bathurst thereby became the oldest inland British settlement in Australia. William Cox, who was appointed the first Commandant of Bathurst, and William Lawson were promised large grants of land in the area and soon sent herds of their livestock to the region.

The Bathurst region was opened up to wider British settlement in 1818 when Macquarie granted ten men 20 hectares (50 acres) of land each. These men were William Lee, Richard Mills, Thomas Kite, Thomas Swanbrooke, George Cheshire, John Abbott, John and James Blackman, John Neville and John Godden. These grants were located at what is now White Rock and Kelso. In 1818, Governor Macquarie stated in his diary:

This morning I inspected 10 new settlers for Bathurst. I have agreed to grant each 50 acres of land, a servant, a cow, four bushels [141 litres] of wheat, an allotment in the new town, and to receive into the King's Store at Bathurst all the Wheat they can grow for the first 12 months.

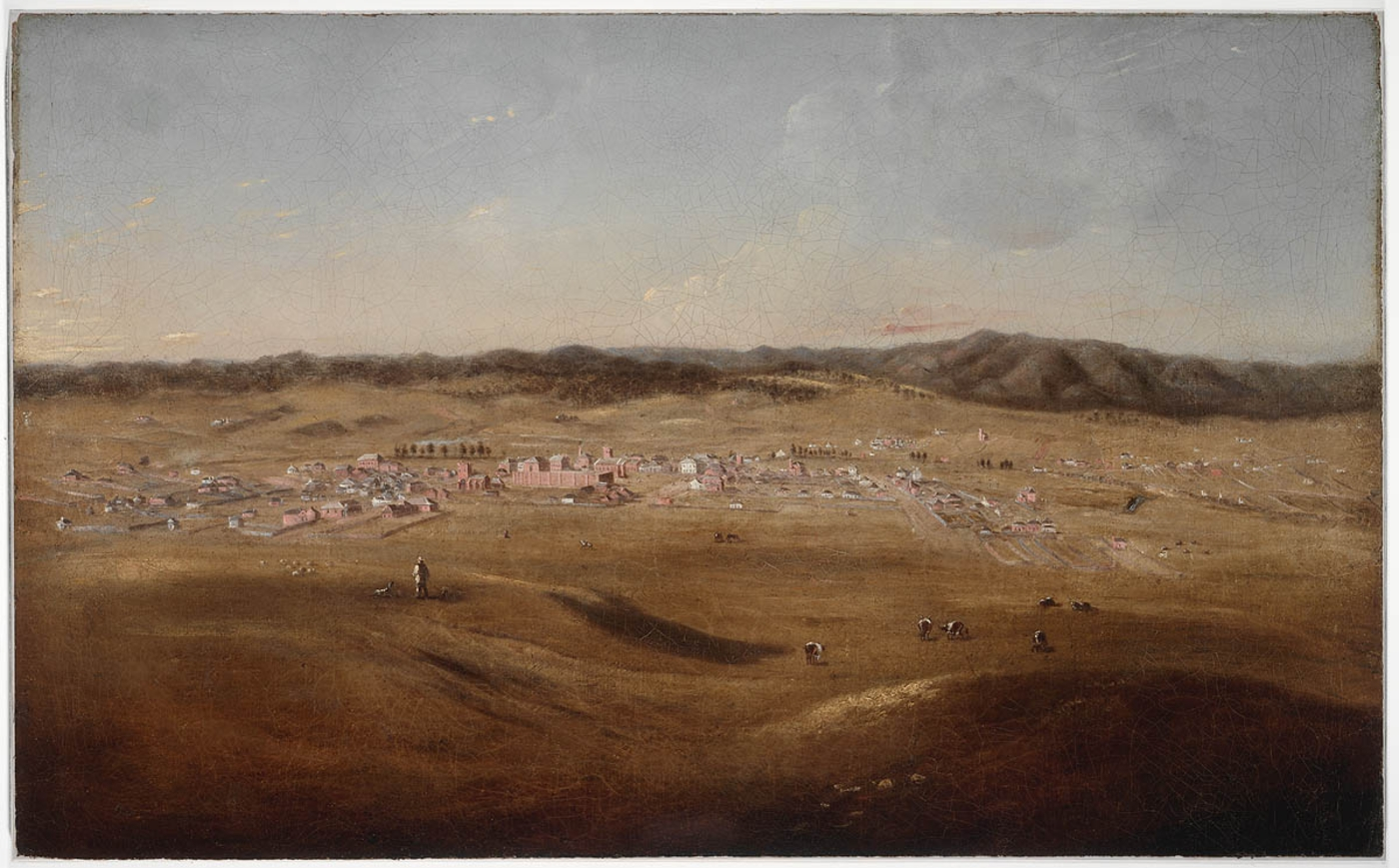
Bathurst, painted by Joseph Backler c.1847–1857

In the early years of settlement, Bathurst was a base for many of the early explorers of the NSW inland, including George Evans in 1815, John Oxley in 1817–1818, Allan Cunningham in 1823, and Thomas Mitchell during the 1830s.

In 1819, frontier conflicts between local Wiradjuri groups and encroaching settlers began when Aboriginal people were shot and others mauled by the colonists' dogs. When Governor Brisbane opened the Bathurst area to wider colonisation from 1822, the subsequent large influx of graziers led to a more intense conflict over land and resources known as the Bathurst War. The Wiradjuri, led by leaders such as Windradyne, continued to resist settler encroachment until martial law was declared in August 1824, after which settlers conducted several raids against Wiradjuri settlements; colonists such as Theophilus Chamberlain, the superintendent for William Cox, perpetrated several massacres. In response, Major James Thomas Morisset was appointed commandant of Bathurst to restore order, conducting several sweeps across the landscape. Martial law ended in December 1824 as the remaining Wiradjuri were forced to make peace with the colonial authorities.

The Bathurst Rebellion occurred in late September 1830, when a large group of over 80 escaped convicts known as the Ribbon Gang roamed the Bathurst district, ransacking villages and engaging in shootouts over the course of three weeks. They were eventually captured and charged with murder, bushranging and horse-thieving. On 2 November 1830, ten members of the Ribbon Boys were hanged in Bathurst for their crimes. The site of the first and largest public hanging in Bathurst is still marked by the laneway sign Ribbon Gang Lane in the CBD.

=== Gold rush era (1851–1860s) ===
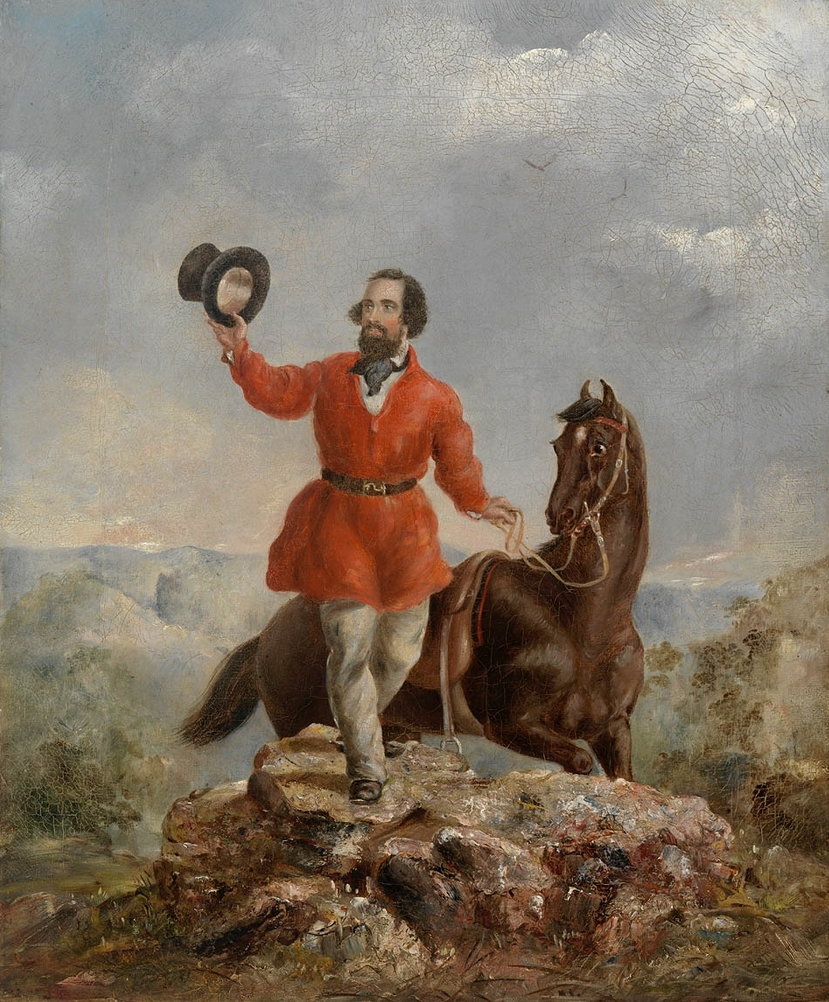
Painting of Edward Hargraves, credited with the first discovery of payable gold near Bathurst in 1851.

Bathurst became the first gold centre of Australia. Flecks of gold were first discovered in the Fish River in February 1823, but it was on 12 February 1851 in a Bathurst Hotel that Edward Hargraves announced the discovery of payable gold 26 miles (42 km) north-west at the confluence of two creeks, a spot soon named Ophir. Further discoveries followed quickly nearby in Sofala and Hill End, and by the 1860s Bathurst's economy was transformed by the discovery of the region's gold and began to boom. The area's fame grew even more in 1872 when Hill End became famous for Bernhardt Holtermann's finding of the 'Beyers-Holtermann Specimen', this being the world's largest specimen of native gold ever discovered, a record that still stands today.

One illustration of the prosperity gold brought to Bathurst is the growth and status of hotels and inns. The first licensed inn within the township was opened in 1835, the Highland Laddie. At the peak of hotel activity in 1875, coinciding with the gold rush period, there were 61 operating concurrently. A total of 89 hotel locations have been identified in the town of Bathurst, with 112 operating in the immediate district during the course of the history in Bathurst. Initially many pubs were simply a cottage with stables. As prosperity increased during the gold rush, the hotels became typical of architecture of pubs known today.

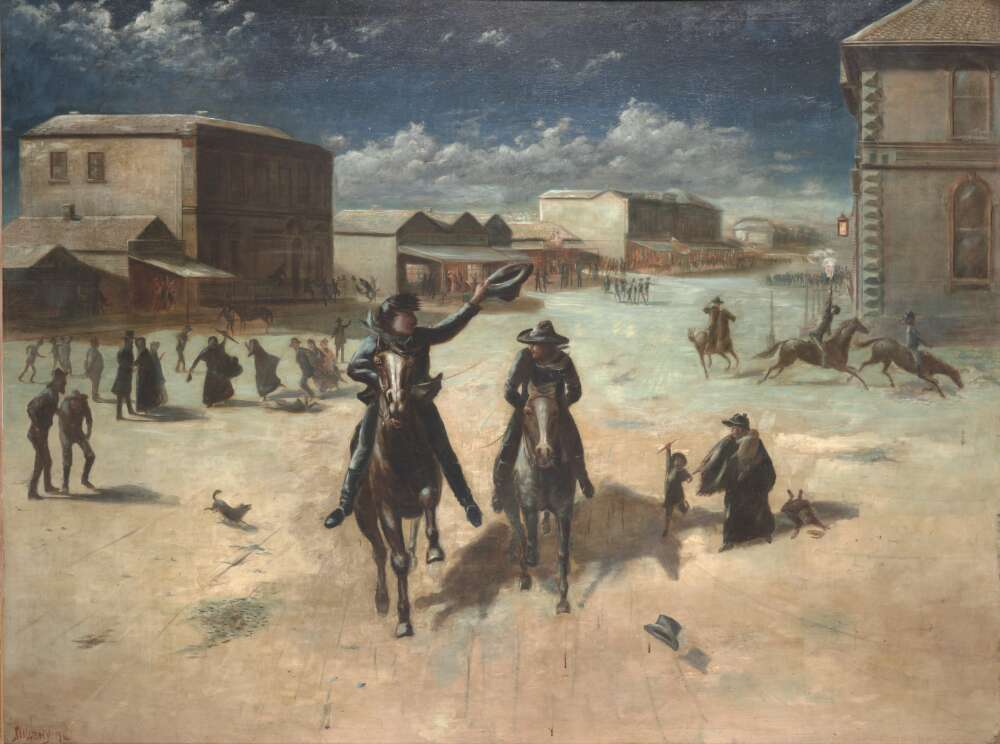
The Gardiner–Hall gang of bushrangers raiding Bathurst in 1863

Bathurst's position as a key transit point for transporting gold to Sydney made it an attractive target for bushrangers, causing a major problem for the authorities. Ben Hall, one of the period's most notorious bushrangers, was married in St Michael's Church at Bathurst in 1856. In October 1863, Hall and four other members of his gang raided Bathurst, robbing a jeweller's shop, bailing up the Sportsmans Arms Hotel, and engaging the police in a shootout. They returned three days later and held up more businesses. A few members of the gang spent time in Bathurst Gaol, including Fred Lowry and John Peisley, who was hanged there for murder in 1862.

=== Development to Federation (1860s–1910) ===
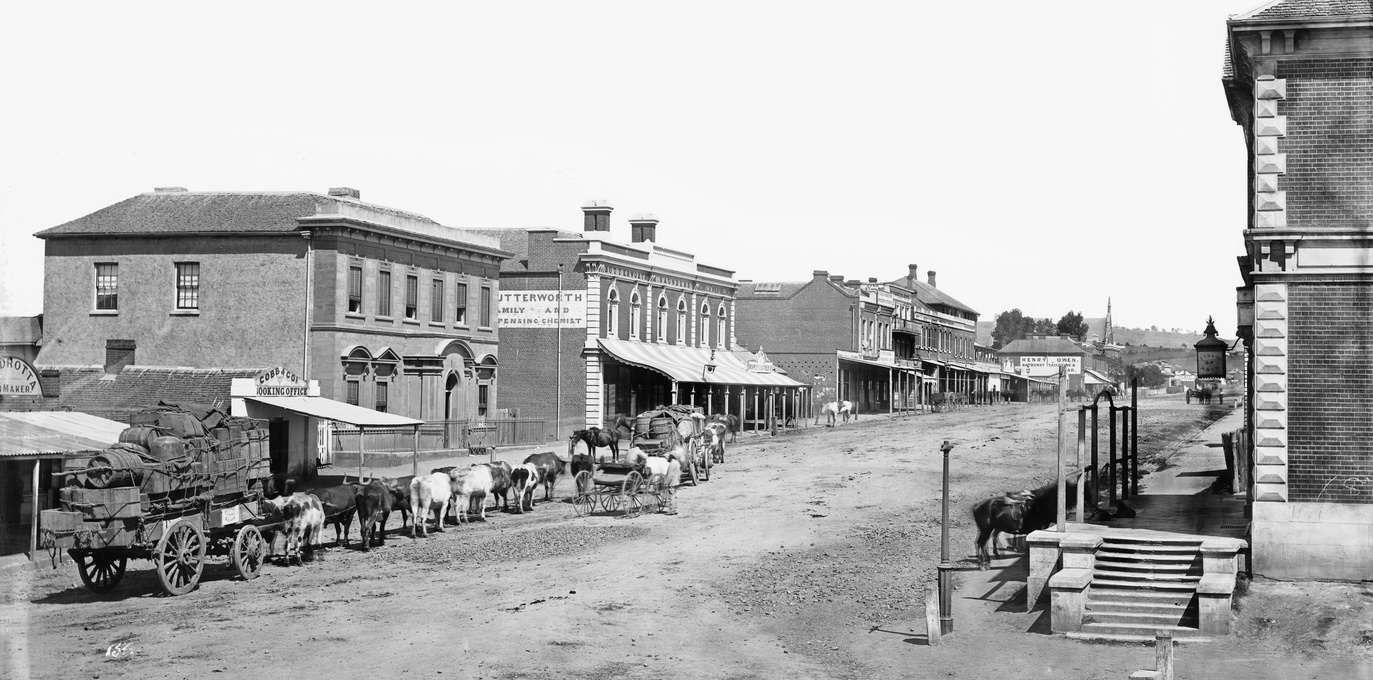
William Street in 1870

==== Coach network ====
The Cobb & Co business was a horse drawn coaching transport business originally established in Victoria but relocated to Bathurst in 1862 to follow the gold rush. The business provided gold escorts, mail services and passenger services to the towns and rural settlements. Cobb & Co. coaches were constructed in the coaching workshops located in Bathurst and the Bathurst Information Centre contains a restored Cobb & Co. coach.

Bathurst later became the centre of an important coal-mining and manufacturing region.

==== Railway ====
The Main Western railway line from Sydney reached Bathurst across the Macquarie River railway bridge in 1876. From that time, the town became an important railway centre with workshops, crew base with locomotive depot and track and signal engineering offices. It remains today as the railway regional engineering headquarters with a large rail component manufacturing facility.

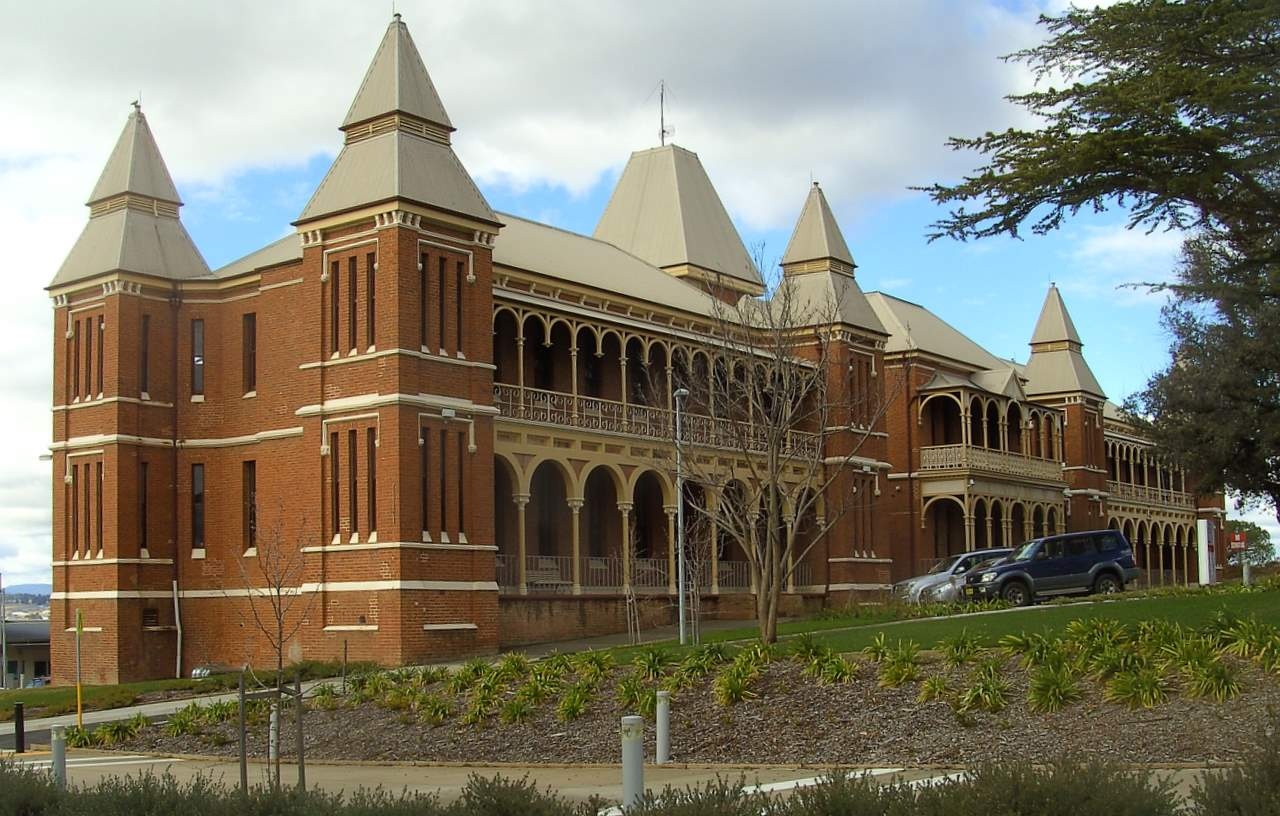
Bathurst District Hospital

The heritage listed Bathurst Courthouse, a predominant landmark of the city centre, was constructed in 1880 based on designs by the New South Wales Colonial and Government architects, James Barnet and Walter Liberty Vernon.

In 1885, Bathurst had a population of about 8,000 and an additional 20,000 people in the district. The town in 1885 was a hub for stores such as E.G. Webb & Co. with supplies and distribution occurring throughout large parts of western NSW and into Queensland and South Australia.

=== Early 20th century ===
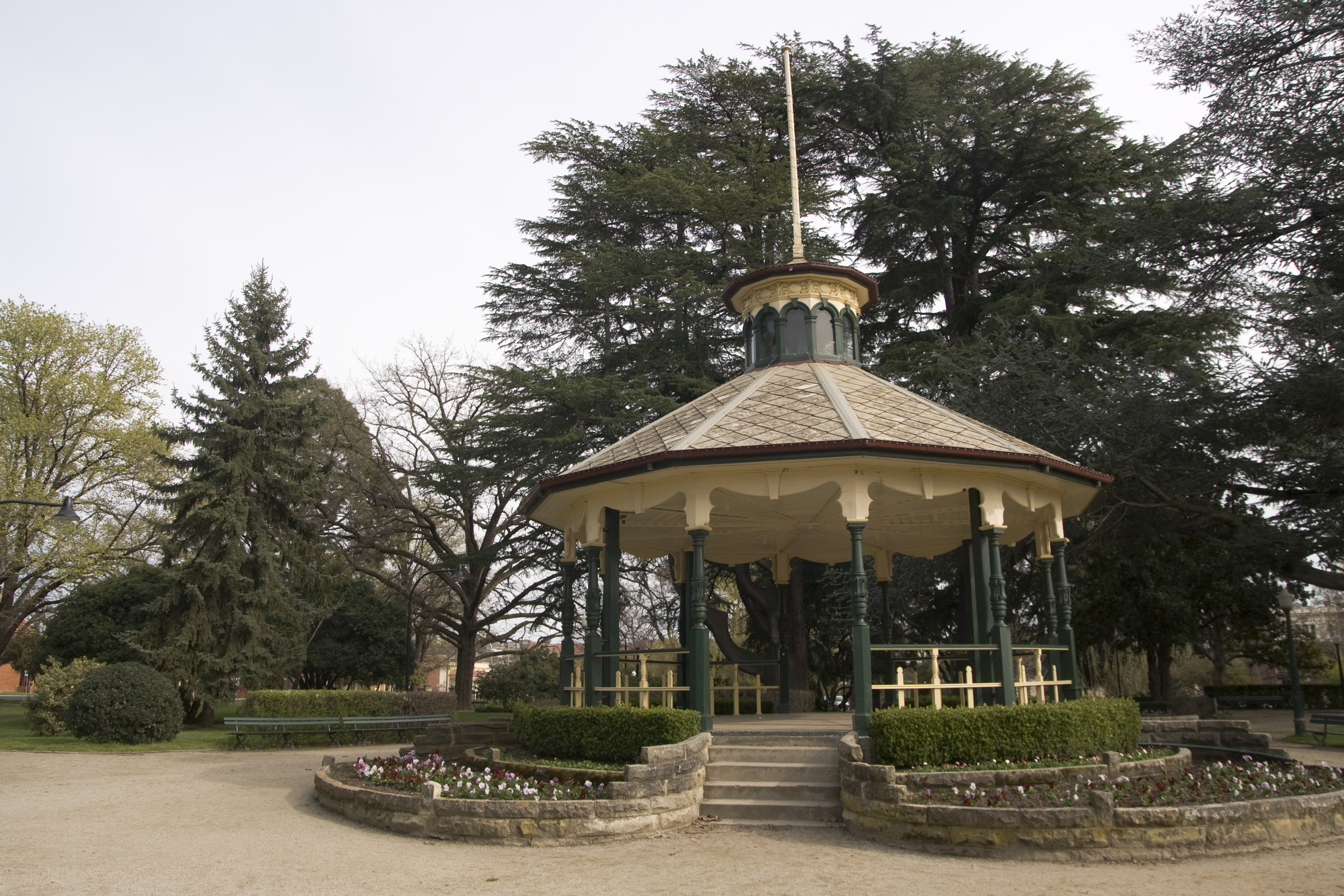
Rotunda at Machattie Park

This period is characterised by periods of slow to moderate population growth, with industrial and education industries developing and technology and services delivered to the town. Several major infrastructure developments arrive such as distributed town gas, electricity, town water supplies, and a sewage treatment system.

==== Town Gas ====
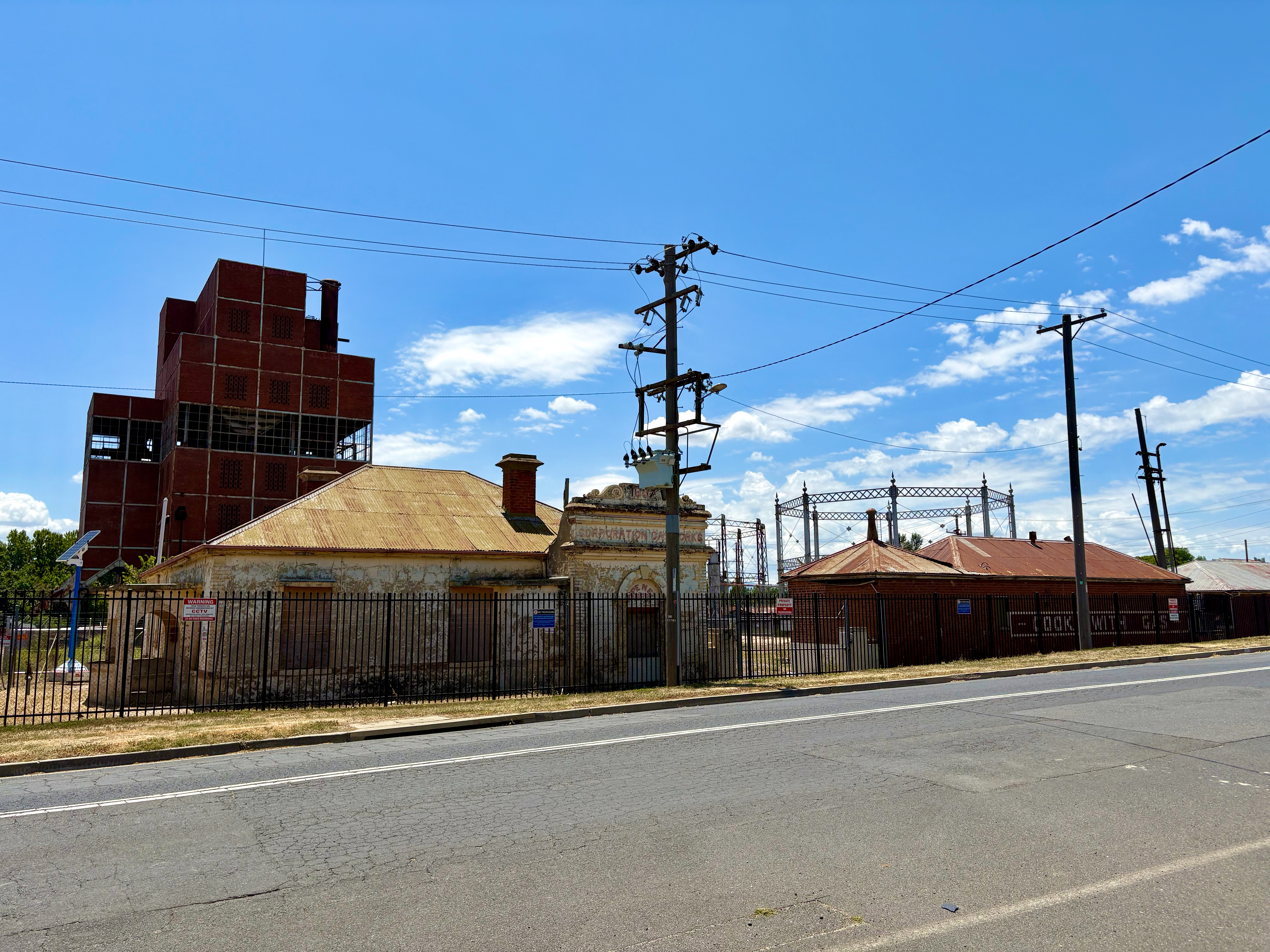
Russell Street Gas Precinct. Corporation Gas Building 1888. Cook with Gas Advertisement. Older and newer gasometer structures to the right. Newer gas plant to left rear.

Town gas had arrived in Bathurst courtesy of a private venture in 1872. Construction began on the 850 cubic metre per day (30,000 cubic feet) plant in September 1871. The streets were lighted with gas for the first time on Tuesday 14 May 1872.

The Council established a competing network from 1888. This set off fierce price competition. The private company had been charging 10s per thousand cubic feet (MCF). The Council decided on 15 March 1888 to charge 7s MCF. The private company then dropped their price to 5s which the Council matched. It was estimated that the Council would save £800 a year in street lighting costs. and that Bathurst had the cheapest gas in Australia.

[An indicative sense of the cost of this energy can be achieved by considering that a cubic foot of less energy dense coal gas is equivalent to up to ~0.5MJ of energy. 10sh in 1901 is ~$67 today. This suggests the Council was buying gas from the private company at ~$120 MJ. The cost saving on street lighting was worth ~$100,000 a year. Today gas costs ~5¢ MJ.]

On 30 June 1914, the Council purchased the Wark Bros gas system and combined the gas networks. The old gasworks plant on Russell Street (now out of use) was built in 1960. In 1987 natural gas arrived via a new 240 km spur pipeline off the Moomba to Sydney pipeline.

==== Electricity ====
The early part of the century saw electricity arrive initially for street lighting; the city converted from gas street lighting to electric lighting on 22 December 1924, when 370 electric lights at a cost of £40,000 were switched on. Lighting spread along streets through to 1935, over time to businesses and finally private houses. Sewage treatment was an early infrastructure project funded by the state government and built in 1915. Water supply started with private wells in backyards. Eventually a waterworks was built to the south of the town on the river with the water pumped through piping laid progressively to the businesses and private dwellings. In 1931, work started on the 1,700 ML Winburndale Dam project to gravity feed water through a wood stave pipe laid to the town. The scheme was opened by the Premier of New South Wales on 7 October 1933. Later, a new larger water supply dam was built on the Campbells River. Originally known as the Campbell River Dam scheme and later renamed the Ben Chifley Dam after the late Prime Minister Ben Chifley of Bathurst. It was opened in November 1956. The Ben Chifley Dam received a major storage upgrade designed to meet the cities needs to 2050; the work was completed in 2001 increasing the capacity by 30% to 30,800 megalitres (6.8×10^{9} imp gal; 8.1×10^{9} US gal).

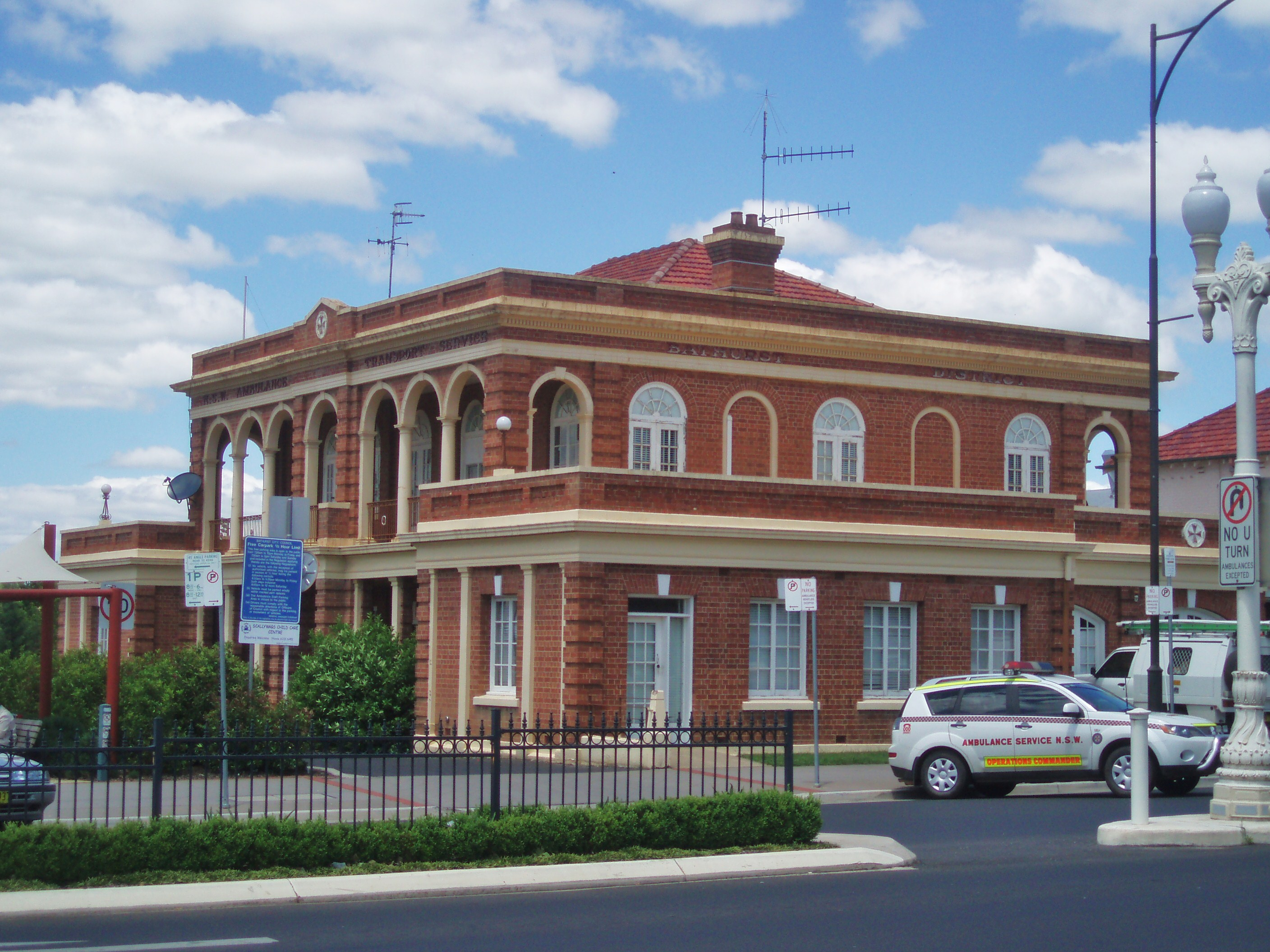
Bathurst District Ambulance Station

An ambulance service commenced on 6 June 1925 with a new Hudson ambulance. A new ambulance station was opened 2 March 1929 and is still used by the NSW Ambulance Service. Motor cars were becoming common in the early 20th century and the need for road service patrols commenced in 1927, provided by the NRMA using a motorcycle/sidecar response vehicle. The early electronic media age arrived with the opening of commercial radio station 2BS on 1 January 1937. Bathurst Aerodrome was opened in 1942, initially to benefit the war effort providing parking for aircraft overflowing from Richmond air force base. The first commercial airline service departed for Sydney on 16 December 1946.

A famous Australian brand name of frozen foods began in Bathurst. Robert Gordon Edgell arrived in Bathurst in 1902. By 1906, he was growing pears, apples and asparagus and experimenting with canning and preserving fruit and vegetables, eventually opening a small cannery in 1926. In 1930, he formed the company Gordon Edgell & Sons which became, and still is, a famous Australian food brand, now owned by Simplot.

Many attempts were made to start a university college, the earliest attempts were 1912 through to 1947 when real progress was made with plans for a state teachers college. The first intake of teacher students came at the beginning of 1951 with the official opening on 9 November 1951. The college has transformed over time into the Mitchell College of Advanced Education on 1 January 1970. The college grew and ultimately became the Charles Sturt University on 19 July 1989.

Bathurst was one of the locations to campaign to be the site of the new federal capital. In an essay prepared by a journalist with the Bathurst Times, Price Warung, in 1901 to promote Bathurst's candidacy, he responds to the federal committees key requirements for the capital to have: "centrality and accessibility of situation, salubrity, and capacity for impregnable defence". The proposed site for the capital city would have been slightly north-west of Bathurst, straddling the Macquarie River, at the locality known as Elrington.

=== World War II and Bathurst Migrant Camp ===
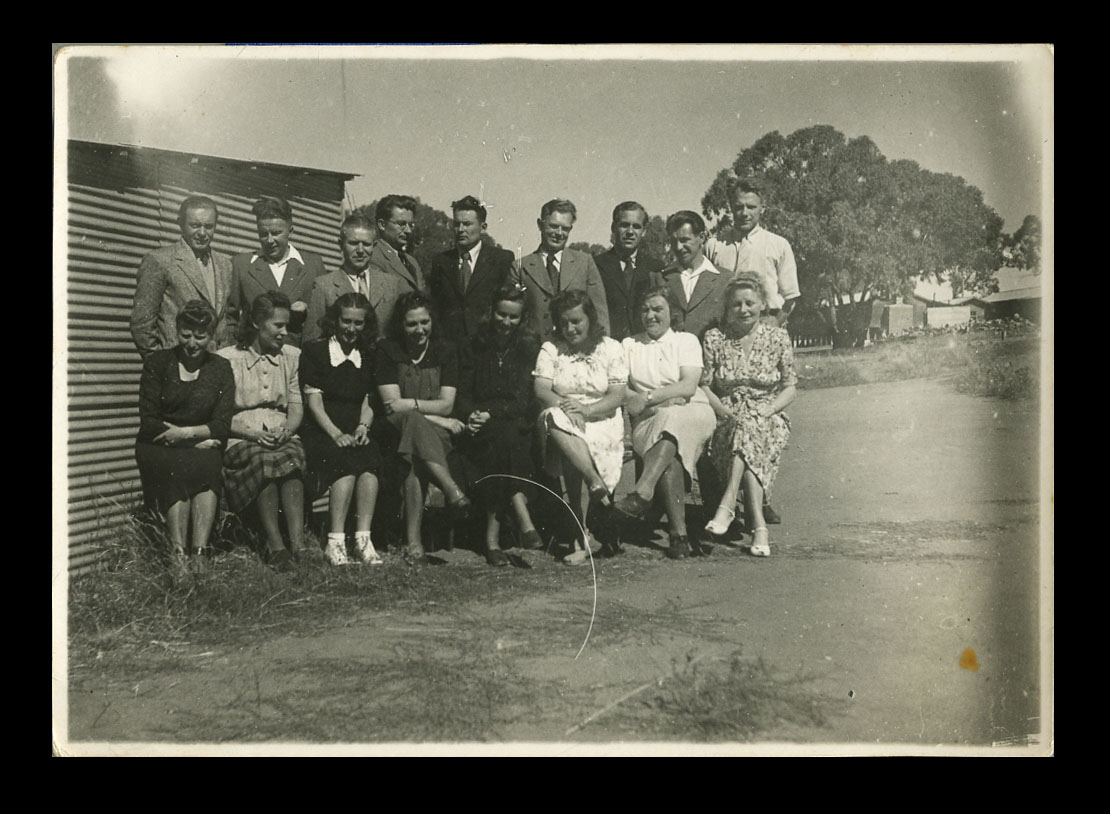
Post-war migrants at the Bathurst Migrant Centre, 1949

An Australian Army camp was established at Bathurst in early 1940, intended for the Second Australian Imperial Force's 1st Armoured Division; however, it was later converted to an infantry training centre due to the unsuitability of the closely settled area to armoured training. Following World War II, the camp was converted to a migrant reception and training centre, with the first group of migrants arriving in 1948. At times the centre had up to 10,000 residents at one time, taking in a total of around 100,000 migrants before its closure in 1952, when Villawood Migrant Centre was opened. Officially Bathurst Migrant Reception and Training Centre, it was usually referred to as Bathurst Migrant Camp.

=== Population growth ===
Bathurst's population has had rapid growth periods throughout its history; during the mid to late 19th century gold rush period, then post World War 2 when migrants from the war ravaged countries were settled in the area and returning soldiers were offered farming land, and at the start of this century has been another fast growth period corresponding in part to Sydney's congestion. Other periods have seen a slightly declining population, including the decade around the 1900s and during the 1960s. The following chart illustrates the growth from 1856 to recent times.

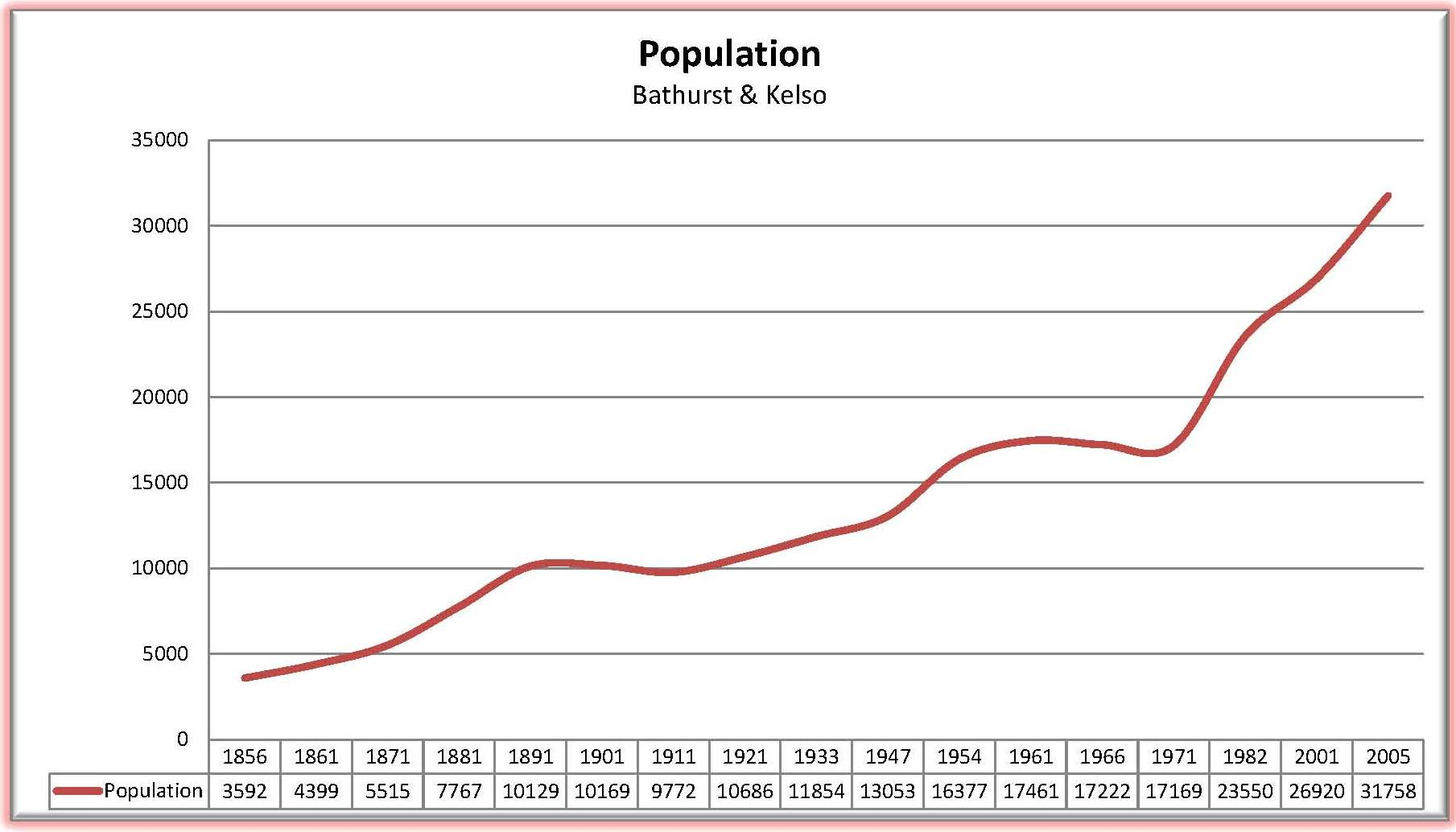
Bathurst population growth 1856 to 2005

The median age of the city's population is 35 years; which is particularly young for a regional centre (the state median is 38), and is related to the large education sector in the community. The city has had a moderate population growth of 1.29% year-on-year averaged over the five years until 2019, making Bathurst the tenth fastest-growing urban area in New South Wales outside Sydney. This growth over recent years has resulted in increased urban development, including retail precincts, sporting facilities, housing estates and expanding industrial areas.

== Geography ==
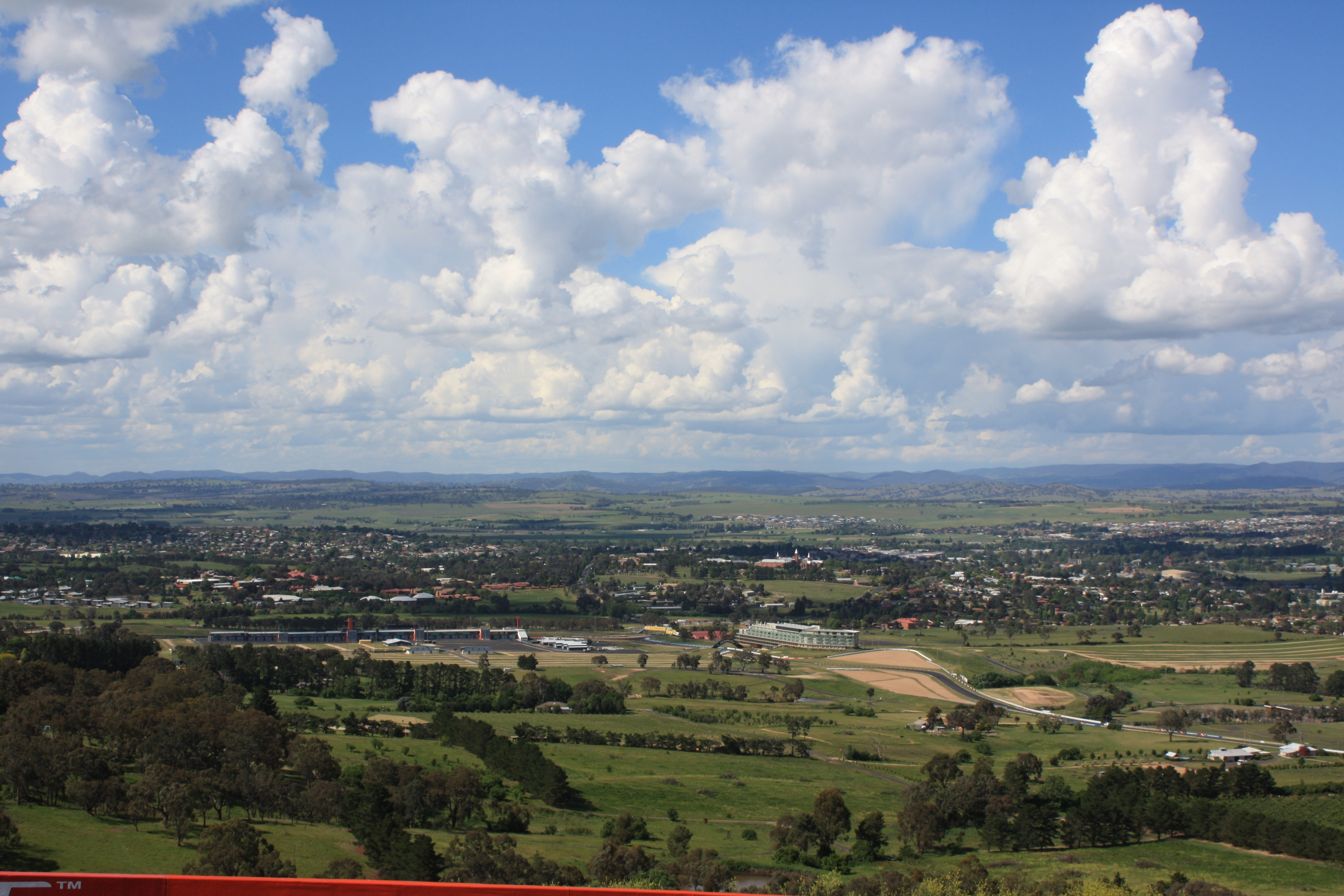
Bathurst and its surrounds from Mount Panorama

Bathurst is located on the western edge of the Great Dividing Range in the Macquarie River plain; also known as the Bathurst plains.

The Macquarie River, which is part of the Murray-Darling basin, the largest river system in Australia, runs through the centre of the city. A number of levee banks have been erected in Bathurst to protect the region from occasional flood events.

Mount Panorama is located 3 kilometres (1.9 mi) from the CBD and effectively within the city limits; it is 877 metres (2,877 ft) AMSL and rises 215 metres (705 ft) above the Bathurst CBD.

The Great Western Highway, which begins in the centre of the city of Sydney, ends at Bathurst. Two main state highways start at Bathurst: the Mitchell Highway to Bourke and the Mid-Western Highway to Hay. Bathurst is about mid-way along a regional road route from Canberra and Goulburn to Mudgee and the Hunter Region. Bathurst is also on the Main Western railway line that starts at Sydney Central and proceeds for 242 kilometres (150 mi) by rail to Bathurst.

The Macquarie River divides Bathurst with the CBD located on the western side of the river. Four road bridges and two rail bridges span the river within the city area. From the upstream side they are: Macquarie River Railway Bridge (built in 1876) closed in 2011 (replaced with a new concrete single track rail bridge structure alongside and brought into use in 2011); the four lane Evans Bridge which opened in 1995; the Denison Bridge opened in 1870 (closed to road traffic and now a pedestrian bridge); the Gordon Edgell Bridge, a low−level bridge located on George Street; and Rankens Bridge at Eglinton.

=== Landform ===
Two physical components comprise the Bathurst region; the Bathurst Basin and the Tablelands areas. They are drained by the Macquarie, Turon, Fish and Campbells Rivers to the north and Abercrombie and Isabella Rivers to the south. The central basin area of the Bathurst area is mainly granite soils while in the north area sandstone, conglomerates, greywacke, siltstones, limestones and minor volcanos predominate. The south is more complex geology with siltstones, sandstones, greywacke, shales and chert, basalt and granite intrusions and embedded volcanic and limestones. Underlying Bathurst is the dominant feature of Bathurst granite (intruded in the Devonian period) and at Mount Panorama and Mount Stewart basalt occurs.

Topography of the region ranges from slightly undulating to rough and very steep country, about 30 km to the east of Bathurst is the folded and faulted sedimentary and metamorphosed formations of the Great Dividing Range which runs roughly north–south.

=== Central business district and suburbs ===
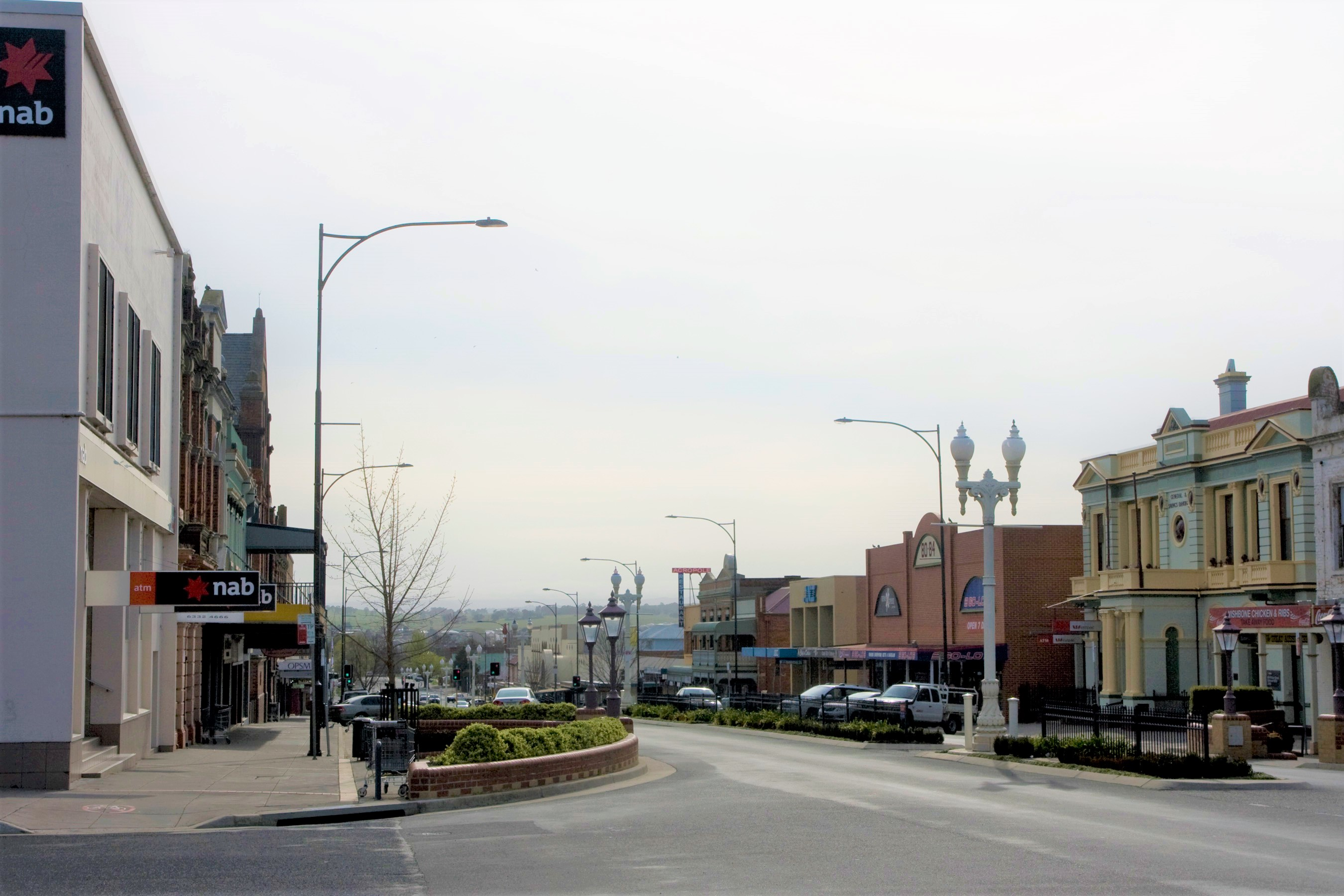
William Street; one of the main streets of Bathurst's central business district (CBD).

Bathurst's central business district (CBD) is located on William, George, Howick, Russell, and Durham Streets. The CBD is about 25 hectares (62 acres) in area and covers two city blocks. Banking, government services, shopping centres, retail shops, a park (shown) and monuments are in this area.

Bathurst has retained a mix of main street shopping along with enclosed shopping centres within the CBD, unlike other towns where the CBD focus has split between main street and new shopping centre developments located in the suburbs. Within the CBD lies Kings Parade; this is a park setting with several memorials of people and events in history. It is a popular location for locals to meet. Keppel Street is Bathurst's second commercial shopping area, removed from the CBD by two blocks to the south. This area developed once the railway arrived in 1876.

The main suburbs of Bathurst are: Kelso, Eglinton, West Bathurst, Llanarth, South Bathurst, Gormans Hill, Windradyne, Windradyne Heights and Abercrombie Estate. One of the newer suburbs is Marsden Estate, in Kelso.

=== Climate ===
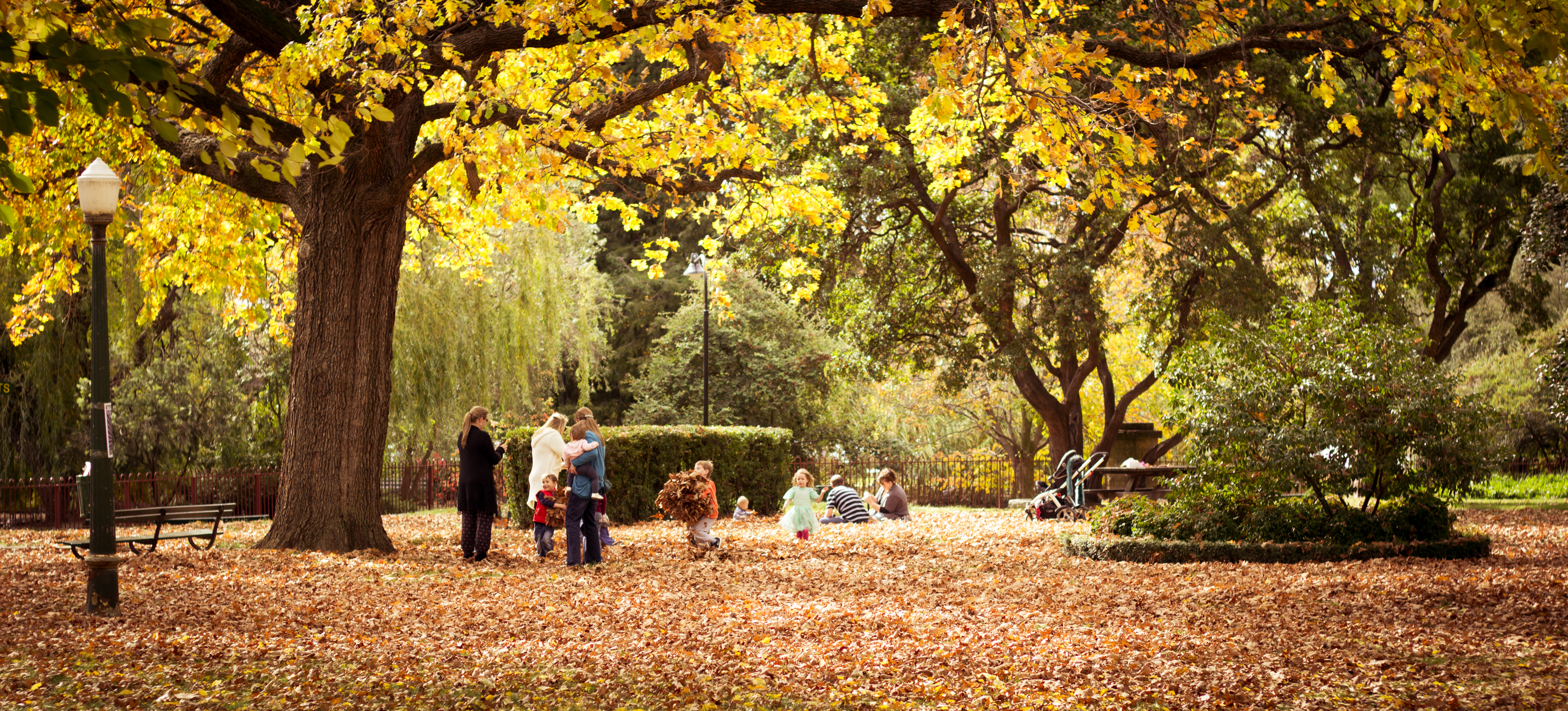
Autumn foliage in central Bathurst during May

Due to its elevation, Bathurst has an oceanic climate (Cfb), according to the Köppen climate classification. Bathurst is in Australia's cool temperate zone, having warm summers and cool to cold winters with four distinct seasons. Regular spring and summer thunderstorms are common, resulting from the flat plains country to the west, leading into the mountainous nature of the country around Bathurst and assisting the development of storm cells. These storms do not often strike the city and instead move either in a south-east or north-east direction away from Bathurst. Bathurst gets 106.9 clear days annually.

In winter, light to moderate snowfalls occur each year on the high country around Bathurst, while snow is relatively rare in the city itself due to its modest elevation at a northern latitude. On 5 July 1900, Bathurst received a freak snowfall measuring at 68 centimetres (27 in) in the main street. Bathurst is relatively dry year round as it lies in a rain shadow flanked by hills and ranges on all sides.

On 11 February 2017, Bathurst Ag recorded a new record high temperature of 41.5 °C (106.7 °F), although temperatures of 40 °C (104 °F) are exceedingly rare for Bathurst. There is a reading of 44.7 °C (112.5 °F) on 12 January 1878 at the Gaol, however such a reading may have been subject to overexposure. The highest minimum temperatures on record are 28.1 °C (82.6 °F) on 14 January 1939, and 27.8 °C (82.0 °F) on 20 November 1904.

The lowest recorded temperature was −10.6 °C (12.9 °F) on 31 July 1873; and the lowest maximum temperature was an extraordinary −0.8 °C (30.6 °F) on 18 June 1877, which is the only known daily maximum below 0 °C (32 °F) to have occurred in a major Australian city. Bathurst is one of only a handful of Australian towns to have recorded a sub-freezing maximum (others include Guyra and Nimmitabel), while at least one month has remained entirely free of air frosts, a trait common in broadly-temperate Laurasian (European, Asian, and North American) climates.

Climate data for Bathurst Agricultural Station (1991–2020, extremes 1908–2023); 713 m AMSL; 33.43° S, 149.56° E
Month	Jan	Feb	Mar	Apr	May	Jun	Jul	Aug	Sep	Oct	Nov	Dec	Year
Record high °C (°F)	41.0 (105.8)	41.5 (106.7)	36.7 (98.1)	32.0 (89.6)	25.0 (77.0)	21.4 (70.5)	20.5 (68.9)	23.5 (74.3)	31.2 (88.2)	34.3 (93.7)	39.7 (103.5)	40.3 (104.5)	41.5 (106.7)
Mean daily maximum °C (°F)	29.5 (85.1)	28.0 (82.4)	25.1 (77.2)	21.3 (70.3)	16.7 (62.1)	13.2 (55.8)	12.3 (54.1)	13.9 (57.0)	17.3 (63.1)	21.0 (69.8)	24.2 (75.6)	27.1 (80.8)	20.8 (69.4)
Mean daily minimum °C (°F)	14.0 (57.2)	13.5 (56.3)	10.5 (50.9)	6.3 (43.3)	2.9 (37.2)	1.7 (35.1)	0.6 (33.1)	0.8 (33.4)	3.1 (37.6)	5.9 (42.6)	9.2 (48.6)	11.6 (52.9)	6.7 (44.0)
Record low °C (°F)	1.8 (35.2)	2.8 (37.0)	−2.2 (28.0)	−5.0 (23.0)	−6.7 (19.9)	−9.2 (15.4)	−8.9 (16.0)	−7.5 (18.5)	−6.0 (21.2)	−3.9 (25.0)	−1.1 (30.0)	0.0 (32.0)	−9.2 (15.4)
Average rainfall mm (inches)	66.7 (2.63)	63.9 (2.52)	56.8 (2.24)	32.9 (1.30)	35.6 (1.40)	43.4 (1.71)	47.2 (1.86)	46.3 (1.82)	51.5 (2.03)	57.2 (2.25)	70.7 (2.78)	75.5 (2.97)	647.8 (25.50)
Average rainy days (≥ 0.2mm)	8.1	7.5	7.0	5.3	7.7	10.8	11.4	10.2	9.3	9.1	9.8	8.8	105.0
Average afternoon relative humidity (%)	41	46	45	47	55	64	61	53	50	46	48	40	50
Source: Bureau of Meteorology

Climate data for Bathurst Gaol (1858–1983); 704 m AMSL; 33.42° S, 149.55° E
Month	Jan	Feb	Mar	Apr	May	Jun	Jul	Aug	Sep	Oct	Nov	Dec	Year
Record high °C (°F)	44.7 (112.5)	41.1 (106.0)	37.7 (99.9)	33.3 (91.9)	26.7 (80.1)	21.7 (71.1)	21.1 (70.0)	25.0 (77.0)	30.0 (86.0)	35.6 (96.1)	39.7 (103.5)	41.8 (107.2)	44.7 (112.5)
Mean daily maximum °C (°F)	29.2 (84.6)	28.5 (83.3)	25.9 (78.6)	21.3 (70.3)	16.6 (61.9)	12.8 (55.0)	12.0 (53.6)	14.0 (57.2)	17.5 (63.5)	21.4 (70.5)	25.0 (77.0)	27.8 (82.0)	21.0 (69.8)
Mean daily minimum °C (°F)	13.2 (55.8)	13.0 (55.4)	10.6 (51.1)	6.2 (43.2)	2.7 (36.9)	1.3 (34.3)	0.1 (32.2)	0.8 (33.4)	3.1 (37.6)	5.9 (42.6)	8.7 (47.7)	11.2 (52.2)	6.4 (43.5)
Record low °C (°F)	−2.2 (28.0)	1.7 (35.1)	−2.8 (27.0)	−5.6 (21.9)	−7.2 (19.0)	−9.2 (15.4)	−10.6 (12.9)	−7.5 (18.5)	−6.1 (21.0)	−3.9 (25.0)	−6.4 (20.5)	−1.7 (28.9)	−10.6 (12.9)
Average rainfall mm (inches)	66.1 (2.60)	58.1 (2.29)	51.5 (2.03)	42.6 (1.68)	44.2 (1.74)	46.8 (1.84)	44.8 (1.76)	45.7 (1.80)	46.1 (1.81)	59.2 (2.33)	56.8 (2.24)	60.1 (2.37)	622.0 (24.49)
Average rainy days (≥ 0.2mm)	6.5	5.9	5.9	5.8	7.1	8.7	8.8	8.7	8.2	8.2	7.0	6.7	87.5
Average afternoon relative humidity (%)	43	46	48	53	58	64	63	57	52	49	45	43	52
Source: Australian Bureau of Meteorology; Bathurst Gaol

== Heritage listings ==
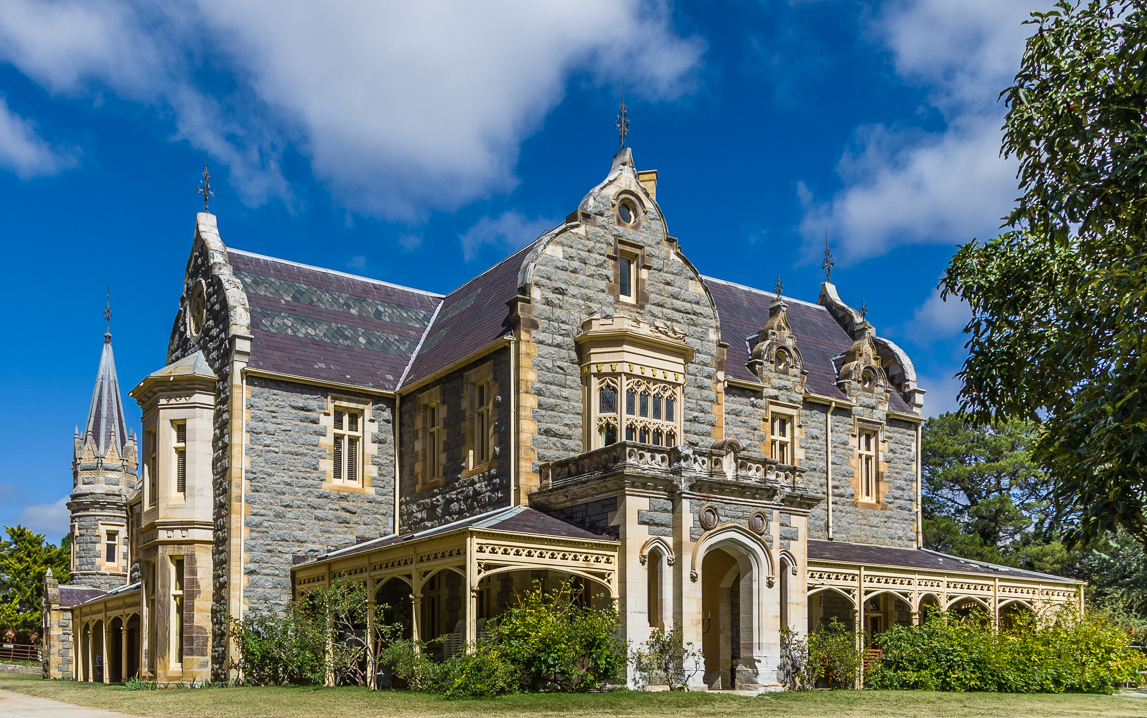
Abercrombie House; grand estates and residences were built by early settlers in Bathurst, especially during the height of the Gold Rushes.

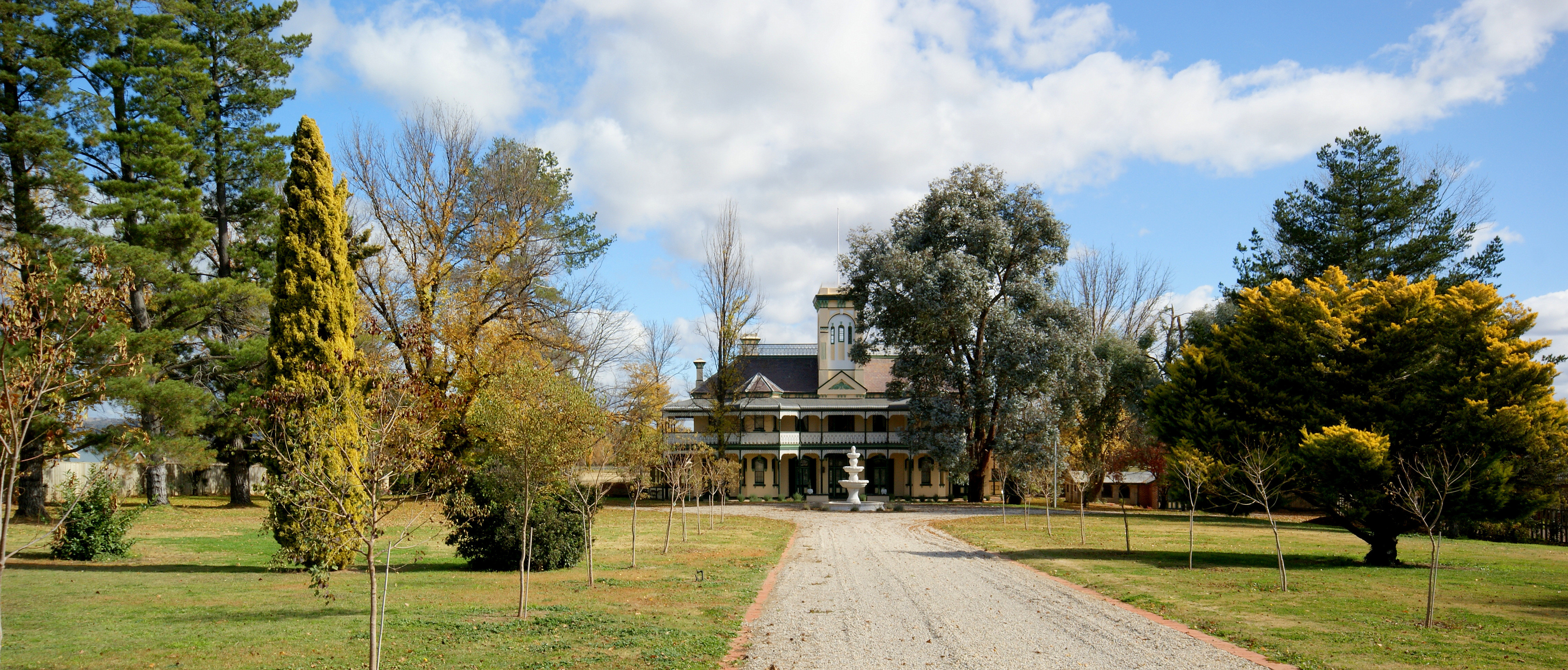
Woolstone House

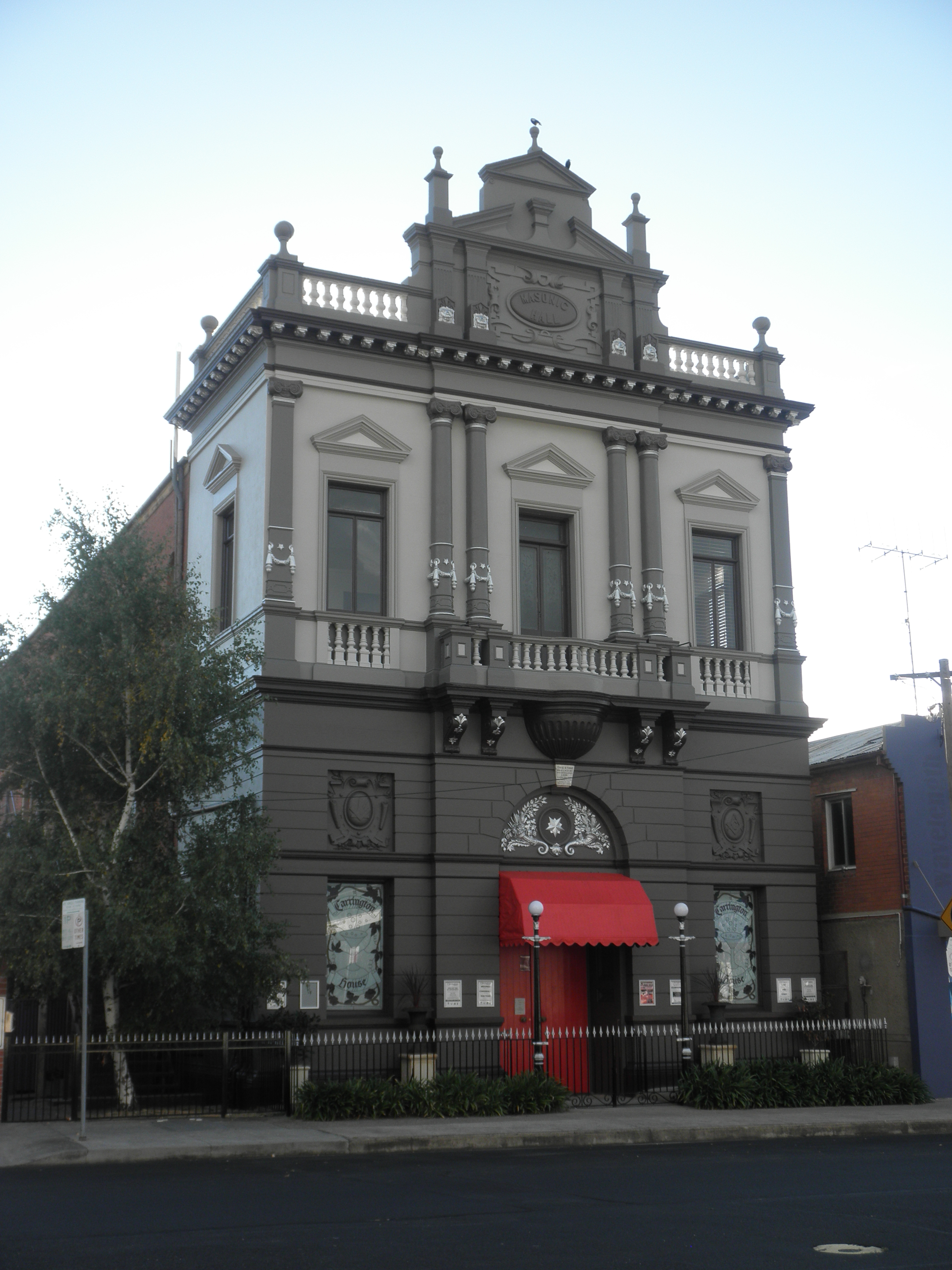
The former Masonic Hall

Bathurst has a number of sites listed on the New South Wales Heritage Register, including:

- All Saints Anglican Cathedral Church Street: All Saints Cathedral Bells
- Bathurst City Library 70–78 Keppel Street: Bathurst Old School of Arts Library Collection
- Bathurst Street Lamps, located throughout the central business district
- Bentinck Street: Bentinck Street Elm Trees
- 67 and 71 Bentinck Street: Bentinck Street houses
- Browning Street: Bathurst Correctional Complex
- 10 Busby Street: Ben Chifley's House
- 218 Gormans Hill Road: Merembra Homestead
- Havannah Street: Bathurst railway station
- Howick Street: Old Bathurst Hospital
- 194, 196, 198, 200 and 202 Howick Street: Howick Street houses
- Kendall Avenue (Great Western Highway): Bathurst Showground
- Macquarie River, Great Western Highway: Denison Bridge
- Main Western railway: Macquarie River Railway Bridge
- 3249 O'Connell Road: The Grange and Macquarie Plains Cemetery
- Russell Street: Bathurst Courthouse
- 321 Russell Street: Miss Traill's House
- 16 Stanley Street: Old Government Cottages Group
- 107 William Street: Cathedral of St Michael and St John
- 108 William Street: Royal Hotel

== Landmarks ==
Bathurst's place in Australia's history is evidenced by the large number of landmark monuments, buildings, and parks.

== Kings Parade ==
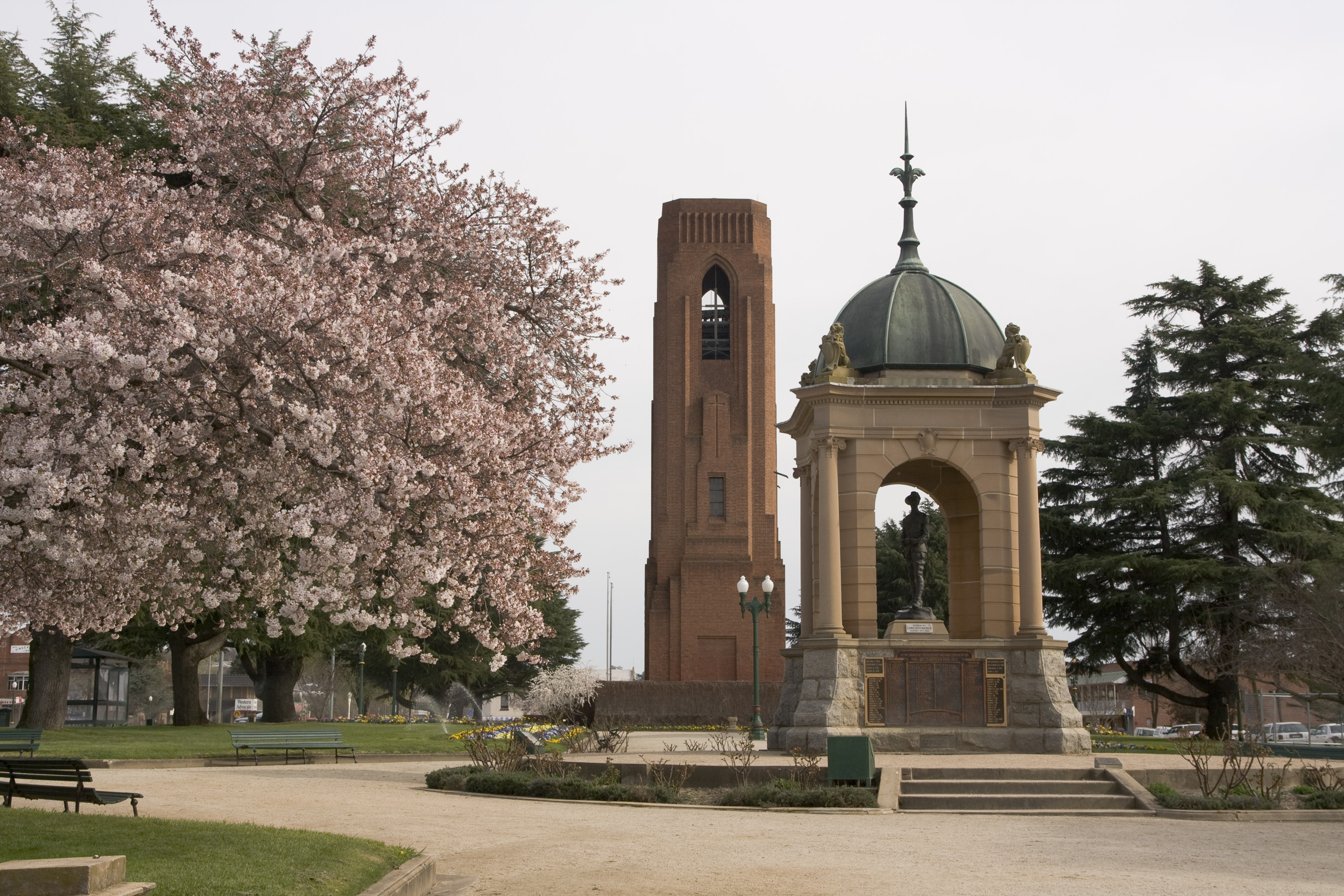
Kings Parade, South African War Memorial in foreground, Soldiers War Memorial in background

In the centre of the city is a square known as Kings Parade.

In around 1838 Surveyor Davidson drew up a town plan that included a Church Square. In June 1848, the Government granted a portion of the Church Square for the fruit, poultry, and vegetable Market. The land was redesignated as a public recreation ground and site for a soldiers memorial. Kings Parade now contains three memorials, an open space park and gardens.

=== The South African War Memorial ===
The South African War Memorial (Boer War) stands at the southern end of Kings Parade. On an overcast Empire Day (24 May) 1909, in what was then called Market Square in front of a crowd of thousands of adults and 1,500 children, Alderman Kenny, the Mayor of Bathurst with a silver trowel laid the foundation stone. The memorial was funded citizens 'in honor of the men from the district who fought in the South African war.'

The monument was unveiled by Lord Kitchener, then on a tour of Australia. Monday 10 January 1910 was declared a holiday in Bathurst. 'The crowd would have been a fair one even for Sydney, as it is estimated that 10.000 people were present.' 'I hope', said Lord Kitchener in his speech 'this monument will always be a testimony of how Australian soldiers fought and died for the Empire in a distant land.' It was thought that the plaza in the centre of the city would 'in all probability, henceforth be known as Memorial-place.'

=== The name of the square ===
In May 1910 the Parks committee of Council approved funds for the improvement of Market Square. Through a series of ballots they arrived at a preferred name having rejected Memorial Place, Central Avenue, Alexandra Place and The Parade, the committee agreed on the name of Kings Parade.

=== The Evans Memorial ===
The Evans memorial stands at the northern end of Kings Parade. The memorial commemorates the arrival in the Bathurst Plains in 1813 by George Evans, Assistant Surveyor of Lands. Governor Macquarie tasked Evans with the survey of a line of road over the Blue Mountains. Evans left Sydney on Friday 19 November 1813, arrived in the areas that would become Bathurst on 1 December and returned to Sydney on Saturday, 8 January 1814.

On Tuesday 30 November 1920 a large and enthusiastic crowd attended the unveiling of the memorial by the NSW Governor Walter Davidson. In his address the Governor said Bathurst was one of the most beautiful and best cared for cities he had ever seen.

=== The Bathurst War Memorial Carillon ===
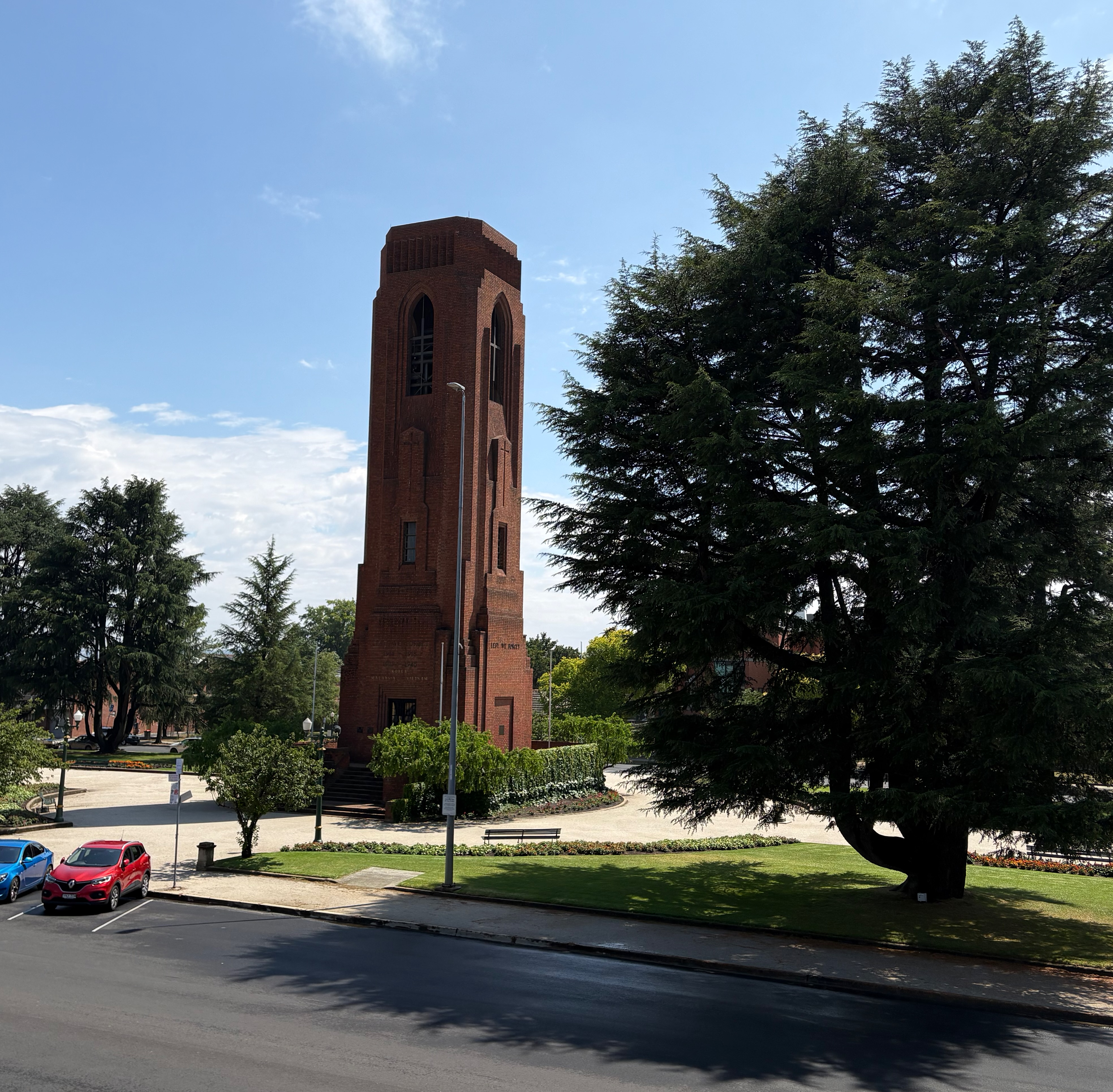
Bathurst War Memorial Carillon

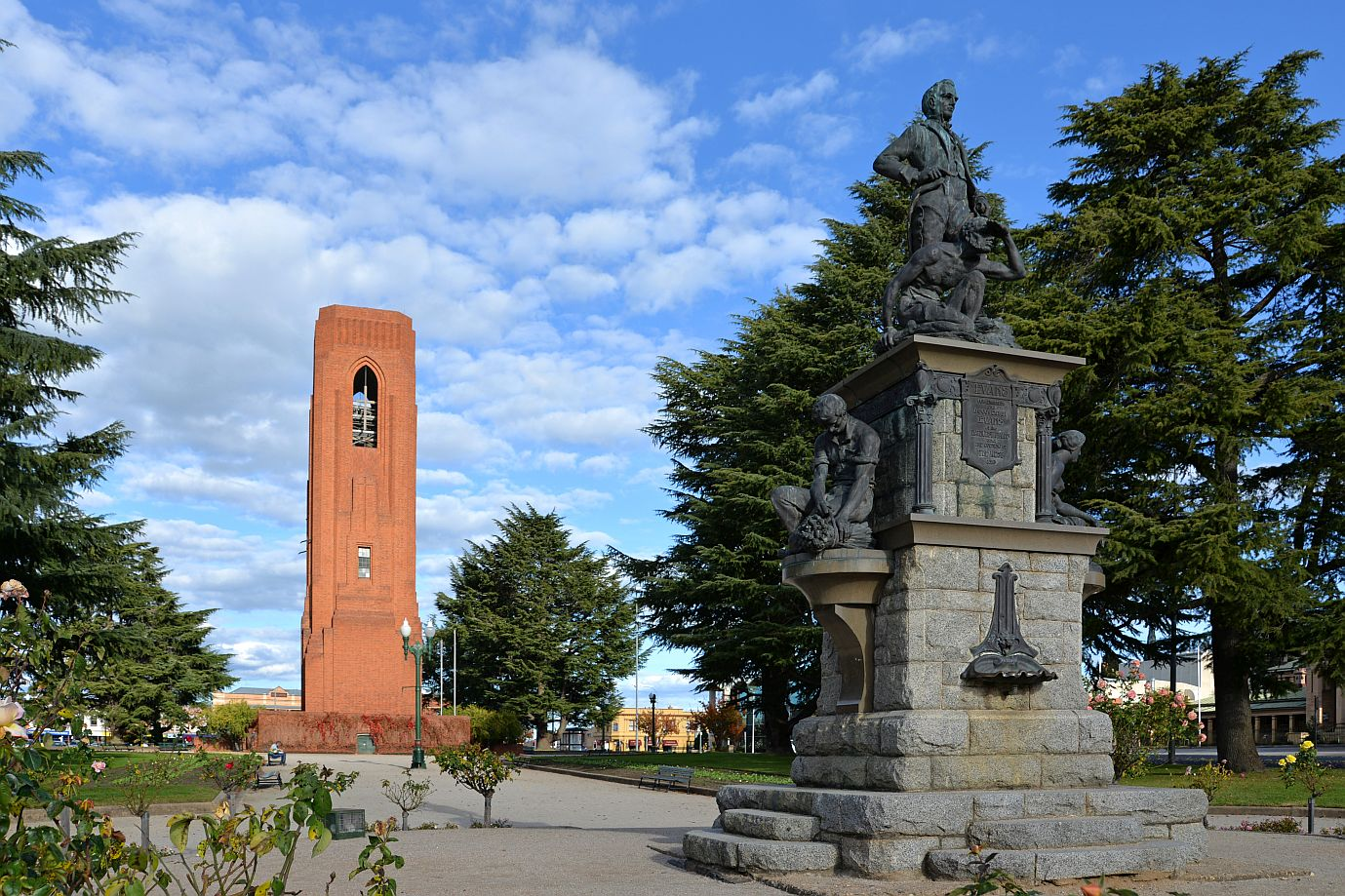
Evans Memorial in foreground. Soldiers War Memorial in background

The Bathurst War Memorial Carillon in the centre of Kings Parade is a 30.5 metres (100 ft) tall tower. The Carillon is a memorial to the soldiers who died in the two World Wars. The bell tower contains 49 bronze bells cast by John Taylor & Co in 1928 that are rung daily at lunchtime, and an eternal flame on the platform level of the structure. The Carillon was officially completed on Armistice Day, 11 November 1933 at a cost of £8,000. It was upgraded in 2020 to World Carillon Federation standards, making it only the third such carillon in Australia.

== Population ==
Historical population
Year	Pop.	±%
1921	9,440	—
1933	10,413	+10.3%
1947	11,871	+14.0%
1954	16,089	+35.5%
1961	16,938	+5.3%
1966	17,230	+1.7%
1971	17,196	−0.2%
1976	18,589	+8.1%
1981	19,640	+5.7%
1986	22,237	+13.2%
1991	24,682	+11.0%
1996	26,029	+5.5%
2001	26,920	+3.4%
2006	28,992	+7.7%
2011	31,294	+7.9%
2016	33,587	+7.3%
2021	37,396	+11.3%
Source: Australian Bureau of Statistics data.

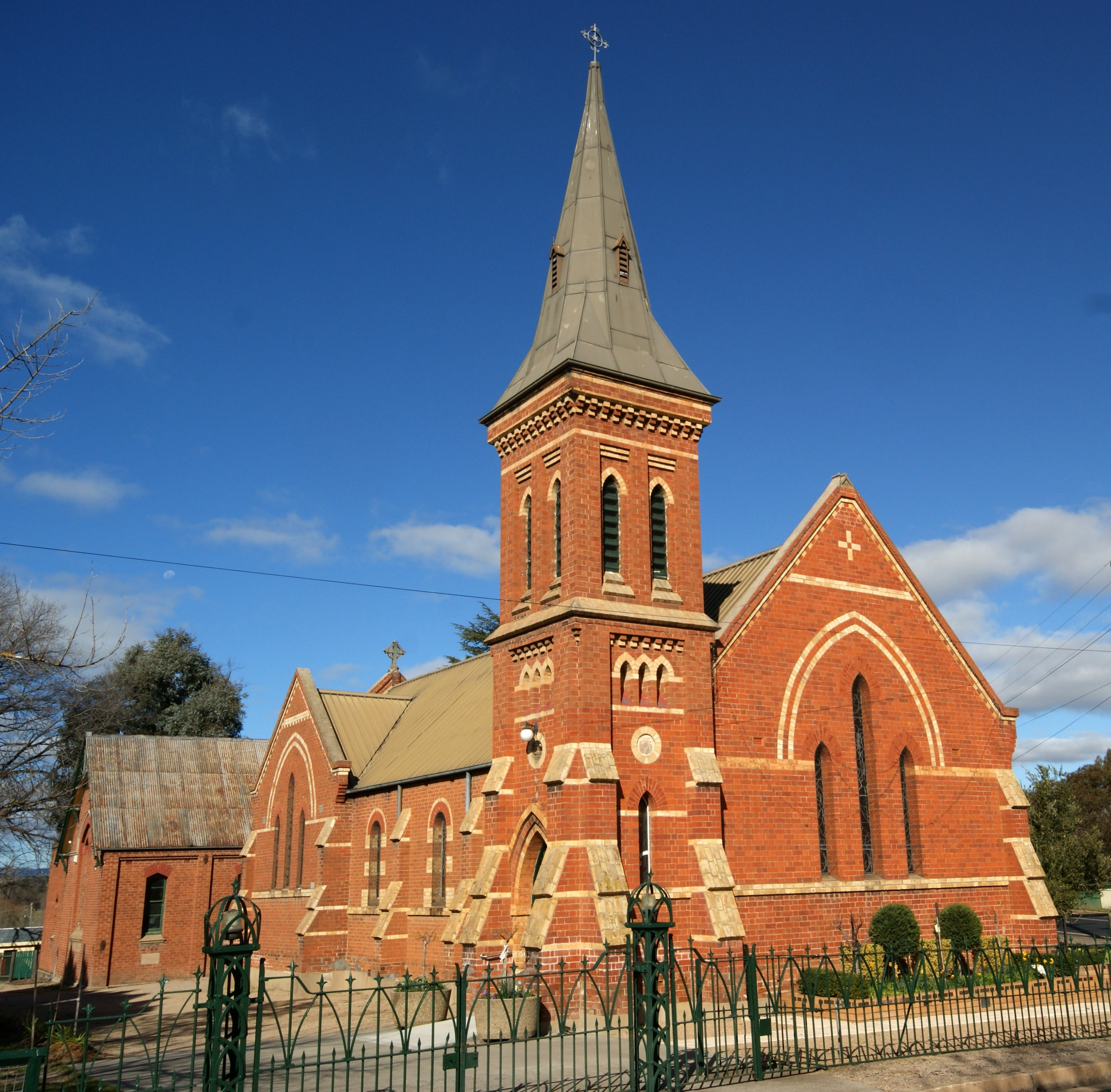
St Barnabas Anglican Church

In 2021, there were 37,396 people in Bathurst.

- Aboriginal and Torres Strait Islander people made up 7.7% of the population.
- Males make up 49.7% of the Bathurst population.
- 84.6% of people were born in Australia. The next most common countries of birth were England 1.8%, New Zealand 1.0%, India 0.9%, the Philippines 0.7% and Nepal 0.5%.
- 87.4% of people only spoke English at home.
- 9.2% of the population have been divorced.
- The most common responses for religion were No Religion 32.6%, Catholic 28.7% and Anglican 15.2%.

== Governance ==
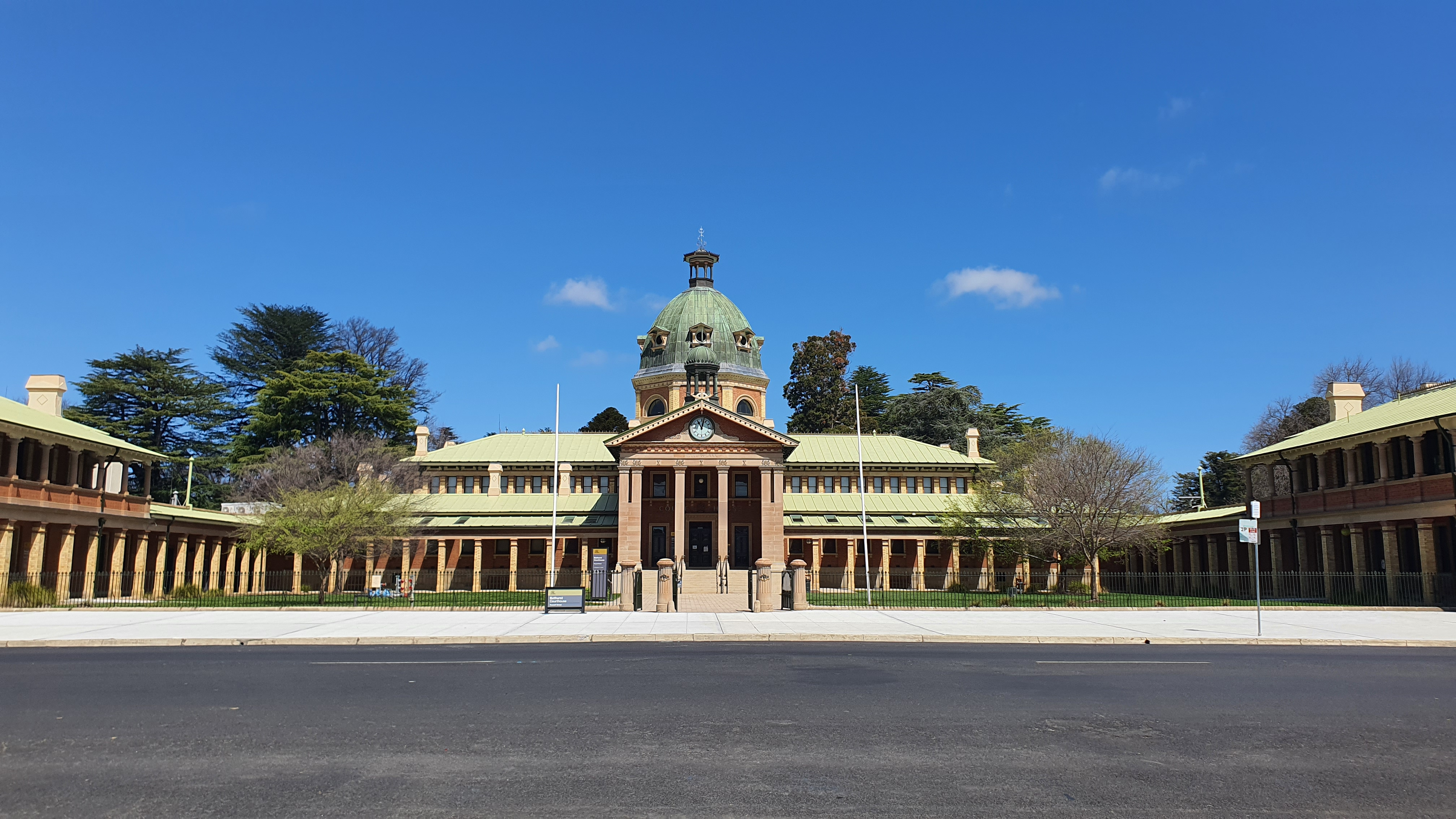
Bathurst Courthouse

=== Local ===
Local government was trialled in the new Colony with a 'Bathurst and Carcoar District Council' established on 12 August 1843, Bathurst was proclaimed a town in 1852 and incorporated as a borough in 1862, next a municipality in 1883, then gazetted a city in on 20 March 1885. the same day as Sydney was declared a city. Bathurst Regional Council was formed on 26 May 2004 following the amalgamation of the Bathurst City Council, most of Evans Shire and a small amount of land formerly included in Oberon Shire.

=== State ===
The Electoral district of Bathurst is the state seat in the NSW Parliament. This seat covers the major centres of Bathurst and Lithgow, and all or part of Bathurst, Blayney, Cabonne, Lithgow, Mid-Western and Oberon local government areas.

Since 1859, Bathurst has existed as an electoral district in the NSW Parliament. Prior to 1856, Bathurst was a part of the Electoral district of Western Boroughs. Before the 1920s, Bathurst was a single member constituency, in the 1920s it became a multimember district with proportional representation. During the middle part of the 20th century the seat was marginal between Labor and Country Parties, from 1981 when the strong Labor town of Lithgow moved from Blue Mountains to Bathurst, the seat was dominated by Labor, except for 1988 when it was won by the Liberal Party for one 3-year term, and the 2011 election when Paul Toole of the National Party won the seat.

=== Federal ===
Bathurst is currently within the federal electoral district of Calare which includes a large part of western NSW from Lithgow in the east to Tullamore in the west. Prior to the 2010 election, Bathurst was within the Macquarie federal electoral district which was more easterly based including the Blue Mountains area with Bathurst as the western boundary of the district.

== Economy ==
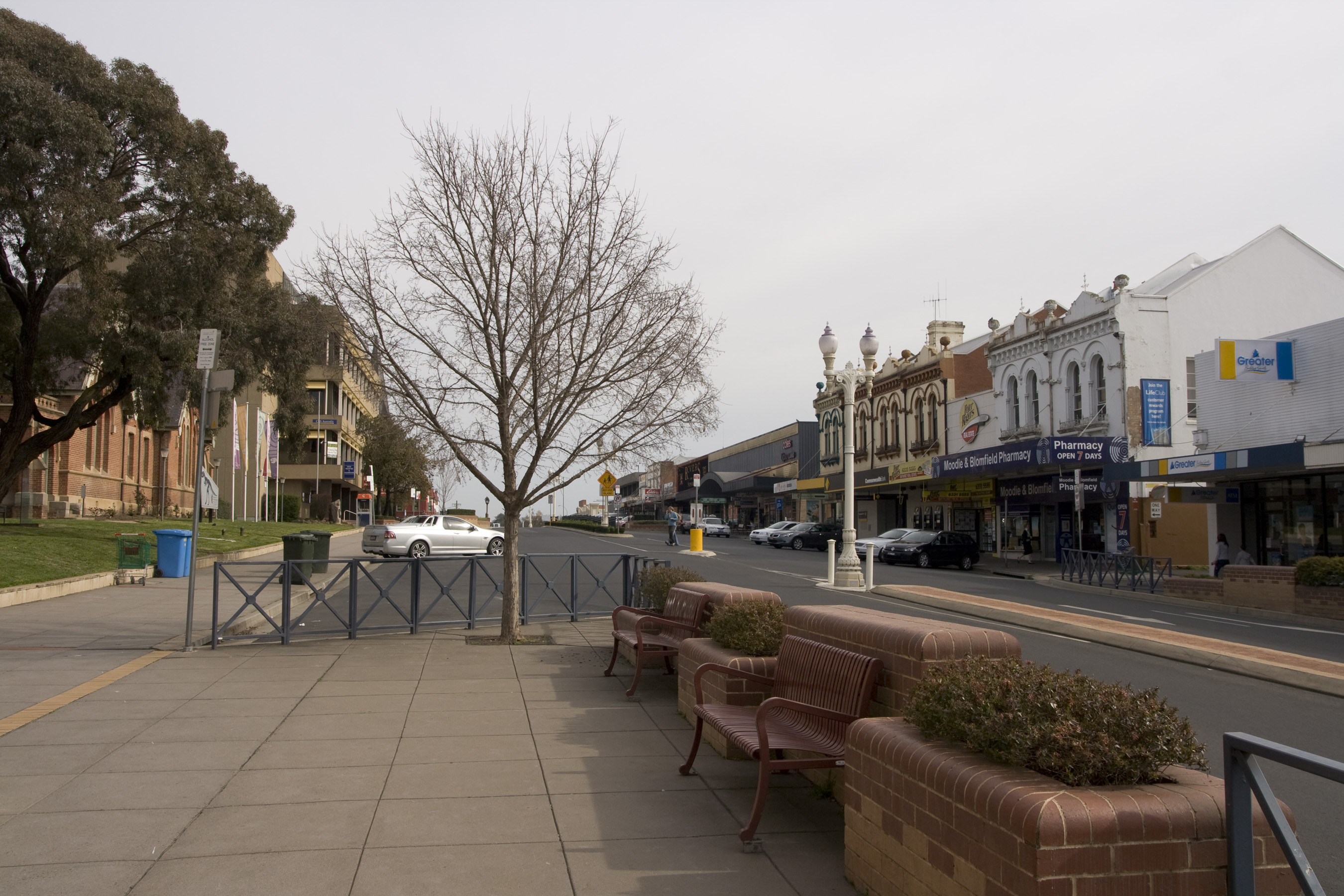
Retail lining Howick Street

Bathurst's economy is broad based with a manufacturing industry, large education sector (including agricultural) and government service sectors. In 2015, the Gross Regional Product was $1.96 billion representing 0.4% of the Gross State Product of New South Wales.

To capitalise on Bathurst's growth, education facilities and youthful population, in 2011 the Regional Council announced it was progressing plans for a new Australian Centre for Science, Technology and Emerging Industries (ACSTEI), also known as the Technology Park, to be established adjacent to the Charles Sturt University Campus with the centre featuring next generation emerging industries.

=== Manufacturing and food ===
Private sector employers with large workforces in Bathurst (according to statistics published in 2009) include Devro, an international company that produces food casing products and Mars Petcare manufacturing plant are the single largest private employers of labour. Companies such as Telstra's call centre, Simplot Australia's (more recognisable as brands such as Edgells, BirdsEye, Chiko Roll, and I&J Seafood products) food processing and canning plant and Burkes Transport a local trucking and distribution company. In 1982, Clyde Engineering opened a railway component facility in Kelso, initially producing electrical equipment under licence from Hitachi. In 1982 it began manufacturing locomotives. It closed in 2013.

=== Public sector ===
Government sector employers with large local workforces include Country Energy with their District Field Office and Corporate Office, Charles Sturt University, Bathurst Regional Council, the NSW Land Registry Services that provide mapping and survey data across NSW, the Western NSW Local Health District – Regional Office, Bathurst Correctional Centre, NSW Department of Education – Regional Office, New South Wales Police Force – Chifley Local Area Command, and NSW National Parks and Wildlife Service – Regional Office. In April 1982, the State Rail Authority opened a locomotive and wagon overhaul facility in Bathurst.

=== Agriculture ===
The Bathurst region's climate of cool winter weather lends itself to stone fruit production and cool variety grapes suitable for wine production.

Bathurst is the location for the Bathurst Primary Industries Centre, a government facility that has been operating since 1895 and originally known as The Experimental Farm. Originally established to study most facets of agriculture in the early growth years of the western inland, work included dairy, pigs, vegetable, cereal plantings, and fruit trees. The site is still one of the most important stone fruit research units in Australia.

Sheep and wool production are the main primary sector industries in the surrounding area with beef cattle a secondary production. Wool has been a significant part of the Bathurst rural scene since the 1850s when the industry was growing rapidly. Lambs for meat production are a common product of the region's farms. Beef cattle breeds are predominantly British, British cross and European cross; the Bos indicus types are present but not common.

=== Forestry ===
Bathurst is the site of a major timber processing facility, which uses timber harvested from the surrounding forests. There are large plantations of softwood timber (Pinus radiata) that are harvested for timber products; the main product being sawlogs, and some pulp. Bathurst is the headquarters for the Macquarie Region of Forestry Corporation of NSW (a NSW State Owned Corporation).

== Motorsport ==
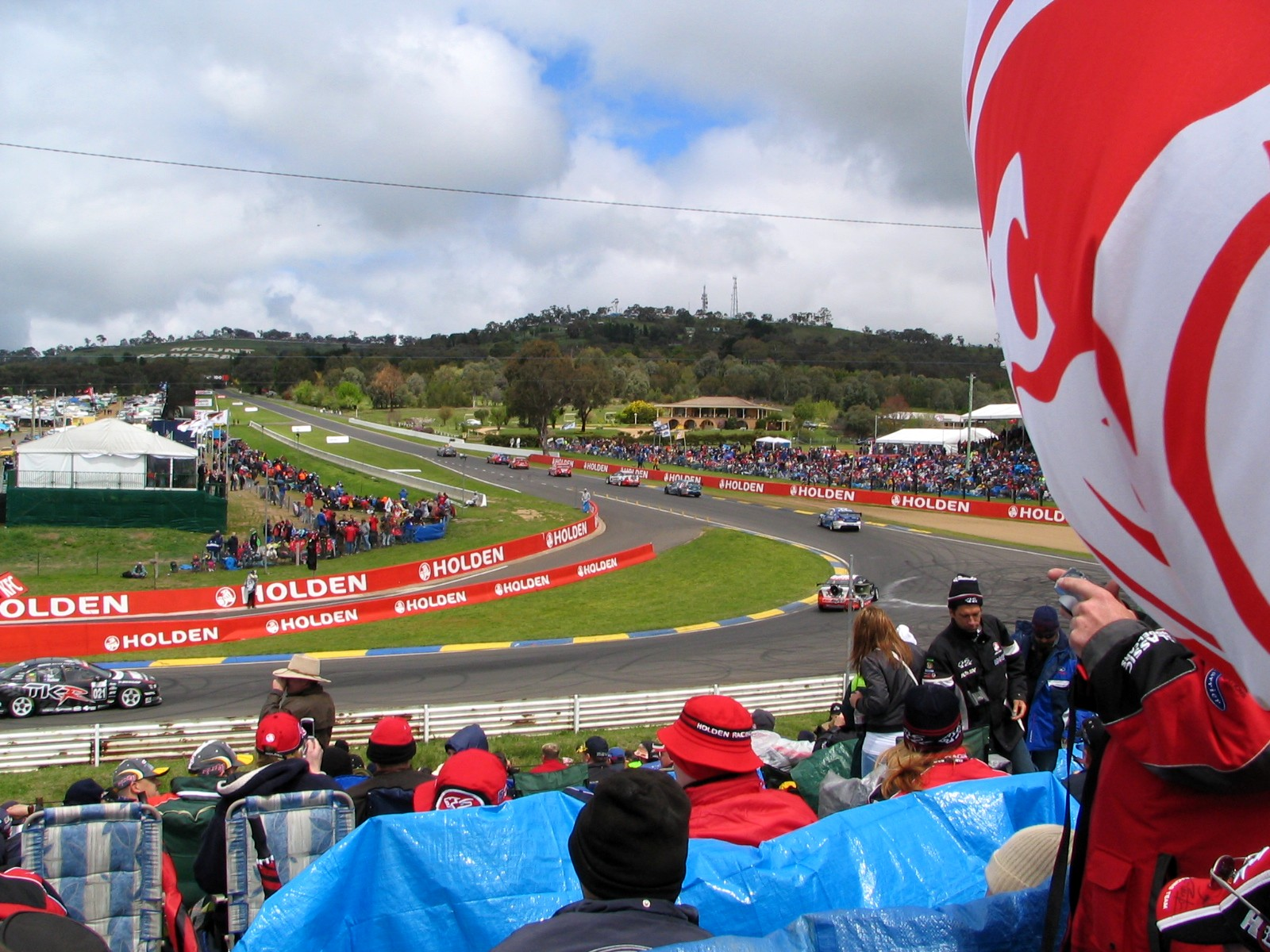
The Bathurst 1000

In the 21st century, Bathurst is known for motorsport, being the site of the Mount Panorama motor racing circuit. It hosts the Bathurst 12 Hour motor race each February, the Bathurst Motor Festival every Easter, and the Bathurst 1000 motor race each October. During these times, the population swells with tourists. The circuit is a public road when not being used for racing and is a popular tourist attraction for visitors to the city. Bathurst has a long history of racing, beginning with motorcycle racing from 1911. From 1931 to 1938, motorcycle racing was conducted at the Old Vale Circuit before moving to the newly created Mount Panorama Circuit in 1938. On 16 April 1938, Mount Panorama attracted 20,000 spectators to its first race, The Australian Tourist Trophy and in 2006 the crowd figure reached 194,000 for the 3-day Bathurst 1000 event.

A group known as 'Mount Panorama Second Circuit Action Group' is promoting and lobbying to incorporate additional track and facilities into the existing circuit to capture additional events and increase the use of the facility.

Beside the circuit is the National Motor Racing Museum. This museum was built to encourage visitors to the circuit all year round and includes motor cycles and cars, representing the racing history of Bathurst. Peter Brock, the race car driver, was synonymous with Mount Panorama racing and a memorial sculpture dedicated to him, is located in the museum grounds.

== Sport ==
Sports facilities in Bathurst include an aquatic center, an indoor sports stadium, hockey complex and the Mount Panorama circuit. The hockey complex includes water- and sand-based fields as well as grass fields.

The city provides dedicated sports facilities for motor racing, Rugby League (part of Group 10), Rugby Union, Australian Rules, Athletics, Cricket, Netball, Tennis, Football and Touch Football. There are over 70 different sporting groups and organisations in the region from the Academy of Dance, croquet, aero, pony clubs, through to the football, rugby, cricket and cycling. Cycling is increasingly considered a speciality sport of the Bathurst Region with ideal road and community facilities around the city. The Bathurst Cycling Club is one of the oldest sports clubs in Australia founded in 1884.

Sports grounds around Bathurst:

- Alan Morse Park – cricket and athletics
- Anne Ashwood Park – rugby union (Bathurst Bulldogs Rugby Union Club)
- Bathurst Sportsground – turf cricket pitch, rugby league / rugby union field, velodrome, and turf 'track and field' facilities – home of Bathurst Panthers Rugby League Club. From 1928 to 1951, there was a motorcycle speedway track around the pitch. It hosted significant events including the Australian Solo Championship in 1931 and the New South Wales Individual Speedway Championship in 1951.
- Bathurst Indoor Sports Stadium – basketball, volleyball, netball, soccer and badminton courts
- Brooke Moore Oval – 3 synthetic cricket nets, and 1 turf cricket pitch
- Carrington Park – rugby league, and rugby union
- Cooke Hockey Complex – 9 grass hockey fields, 3 synthetic hockey fields
- Cubis Park Facilities – 2 synthetic cricket pitches, and 2 full size rugby league / soccer fields
- Eglinton Oval
- George Park – Australian Rules, and cricket
- John Matthews Complex – 14 all weather netball courts, and tennis
- Kennerson Park, Upfold Street – Bathurst greyhound racing, opened 30 November 1935.
- Learmonth Park – 4 synthetic cricket pitches, and 9 touch football fields (turf)
- Marsden Estate – table tennis tournament
- Proctor Park – 12 turf soccer fields
- Police Paddock – 2 synthetic cricket pitches, and 4 full sized turf soccer fields
- Ralph Cameron Oval, Raglan – 2 tennis courts, 3 cricket nets, 2 synthetic cricket wickets
- Walmer Park
- Paddy's Hotel Sports Fields – turf cricket pitch, turf cricket nets and synthetic cricket nets

Gliding is a popular activity and there is a large gliding community in Bathurst. Gliding takes place at Pipers Airfield which is about 5 kilometres to the north of the city. Gliding also occurs most school holidays at the Bathurst Regional Airport where Australian Air Force Cadets (AAFC) from No.301 Air Training Flight learn to fly.

Bathurst, with its young demographic, has established modern sporting competitions such as the Newtons Nation event. At this event, held at Mount Panorama, young people can participate in modern sports such as BMX Dirt Bikes, Mountain Bikes, Wakeboarding, Parkour, Flatland BMX, Krumping, Skateboarding, and Luge.

== Culture ==
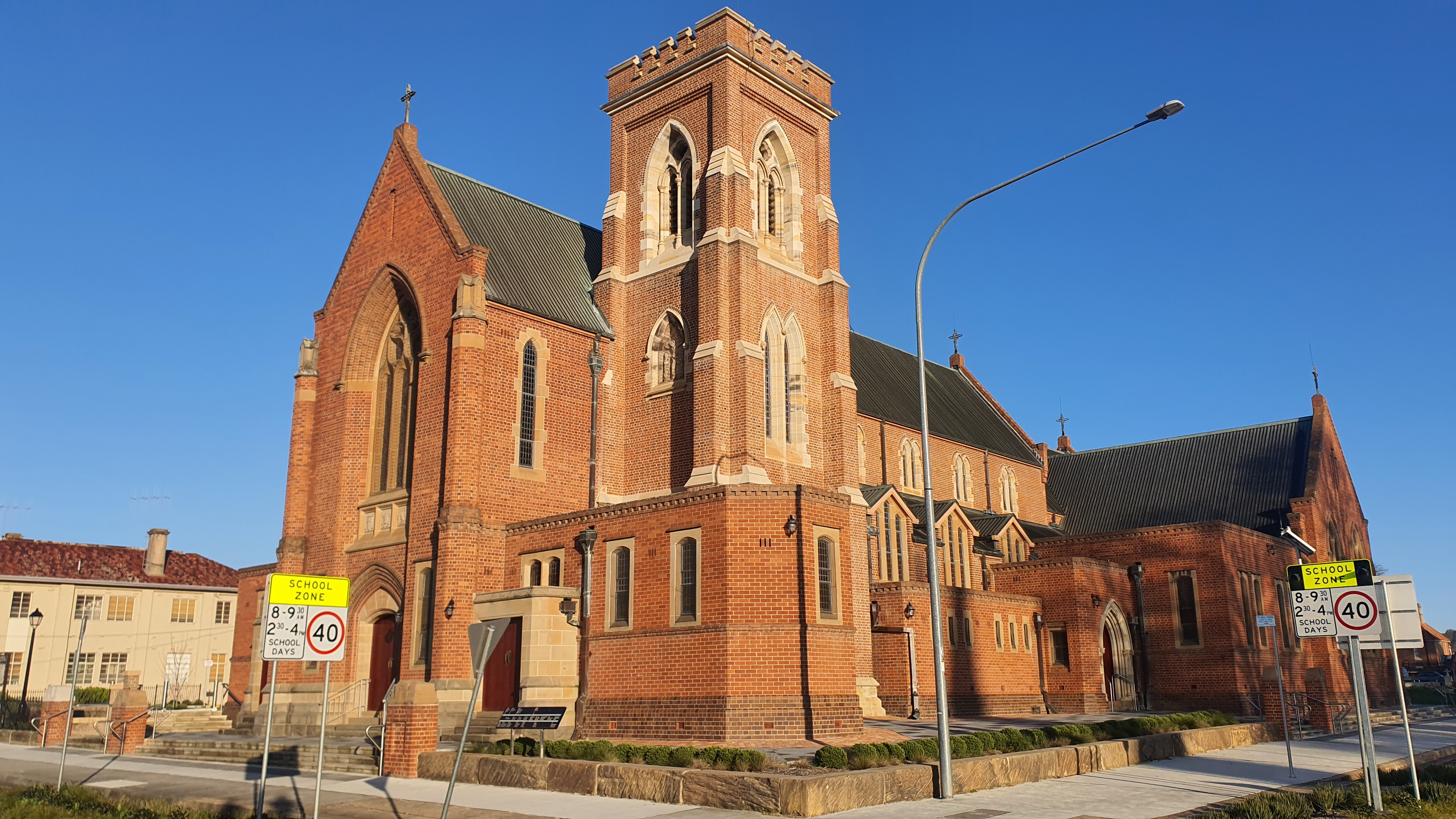
Cathedral of St Michael and St John, built in 1861

Bathurst is a cathedral city, being the seat for the Anglican and Roman Catholic bishops of Bathurst. The city is dotted with many churches and other religious buildings such as schools and halls. The cathedrals are All Saints' (Anglican), and St Michael and St John's (Catholic); then there are many churches and places of worship, including St Stephens Presbyterian Church & Hall, Assumption Church (Catholic), St Barnabas' South Bathurst (Anglican) that was partially fire-destroyed in 2014 and others.

Bathurst was also the home of wartime Labor Prime Minister Ben Chifley, who represented the area in the Federal Parliament and is buried in Bathurst. Each year, the Labor party celebrates his legacy with a function known as the Light on the Hill speech by a senior Labor figure. Bathurst has a collection of house museums representing different periods of its history from first settlement to the 1970s. The house museums include Old Government Cottage built 1837–1860, Abercrombie House a 40-room historic mansion built c. 1870s, Miss Traill's House built in 1845, and Chifley Home which retains the simple furnishings that demonstrated the lifestyle and image of Chifley as a 'plain man'.

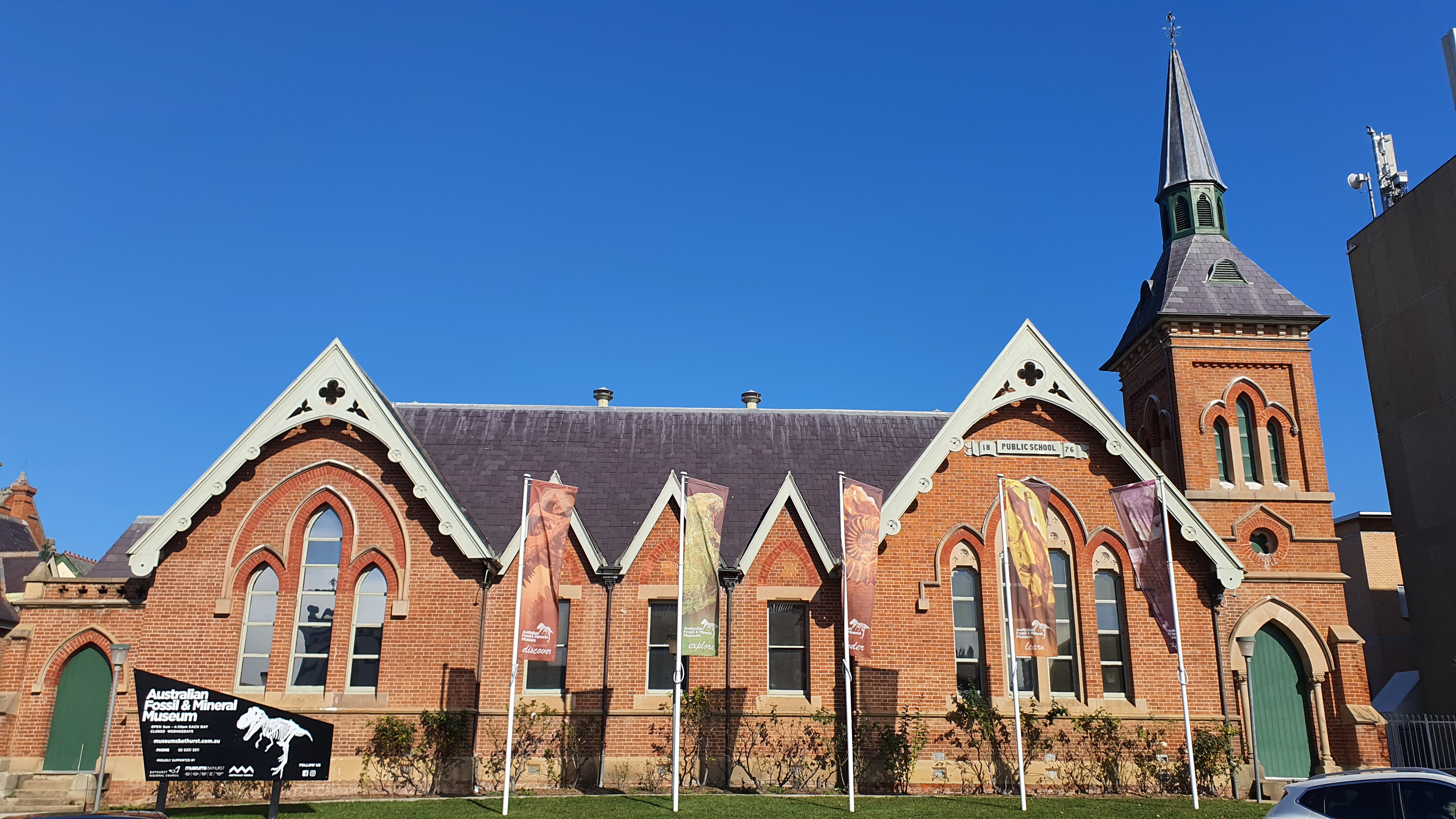
The Australian Fossil and Mineral Museum

Bathurst is home to several museums including the Bathurst Historical Society Museum located in the left wing of the historic courthouse. This museum includes in its collection a range of Aboriginal artefacts and large collections of documents relating to Bathurst's early history and collection of local items from Australia's early settlement. Central Bathurst is host to the Australian Fossil and Mineral Museum, which houses the Somerville Collection of fossils and minerals, and features Australia's only complete Tyrannosaurus rex skeleton. The Somerville Collection also consists of one of the largest collections of tourmaline in the Southern Hemisphere. The Fossil and Mineral Museum is located in the historic school building in the CBD.

Organisations that support the various arts are well catered for in Bathurst they include the Mitchell Conservatorium which was the NSW's first regional, community-based, pre-tertiary and non-profit music centre, it was established in May 1978. The Conservatorium provides musical education and performance opportunities to children and adults. The Bathurst Regional Art Gallery focuses on Australian art from 1955 and has a strong representation of local landscapes and particularly local villages and towns. The collection includes several Lloyd Rees paintings. The design of the gallery allows regular exhibitions with an average of 25 exhibitions per year. The gallery is owned by the Bathurst Regional Council and is located in a modern purpose built building incorporating the Regional Library. Another Arts group is the Macquarie Philharmonia, this professional and amateur orchestra annually brings together professional musicians living in western areas of NSW. Known as Australia's Inland Symphony Orchestra, throughout the year the Macquarie Philharmonia invites selected music students from the region's Conservatoriums to perform alongside professionals to audiences throughout the Region. Carillon Theatrical Society is an amateur theatrical society that has been performing musicals for the people of Bathurst since 1959. Recent shows include The Producers and Joseph and the Amazing Technicolor Dreamcoat. The NSW Government and Charles Sturt University supports the Arts in the area through Arts OutWest which is the peak arts and cultural body for the Central West area of NSW, operating since 1974. This group promotes and educates arts and cultural development for Bathurst and the region.

The Bathurst Memorial Entertainment Centre (BMEC) is a new purpose built building completed in 1999 that provides a venue for local and visiting performances. BMEC has an annual season of entertainment encompassing all forms of the performing arts from Australia and around the world.

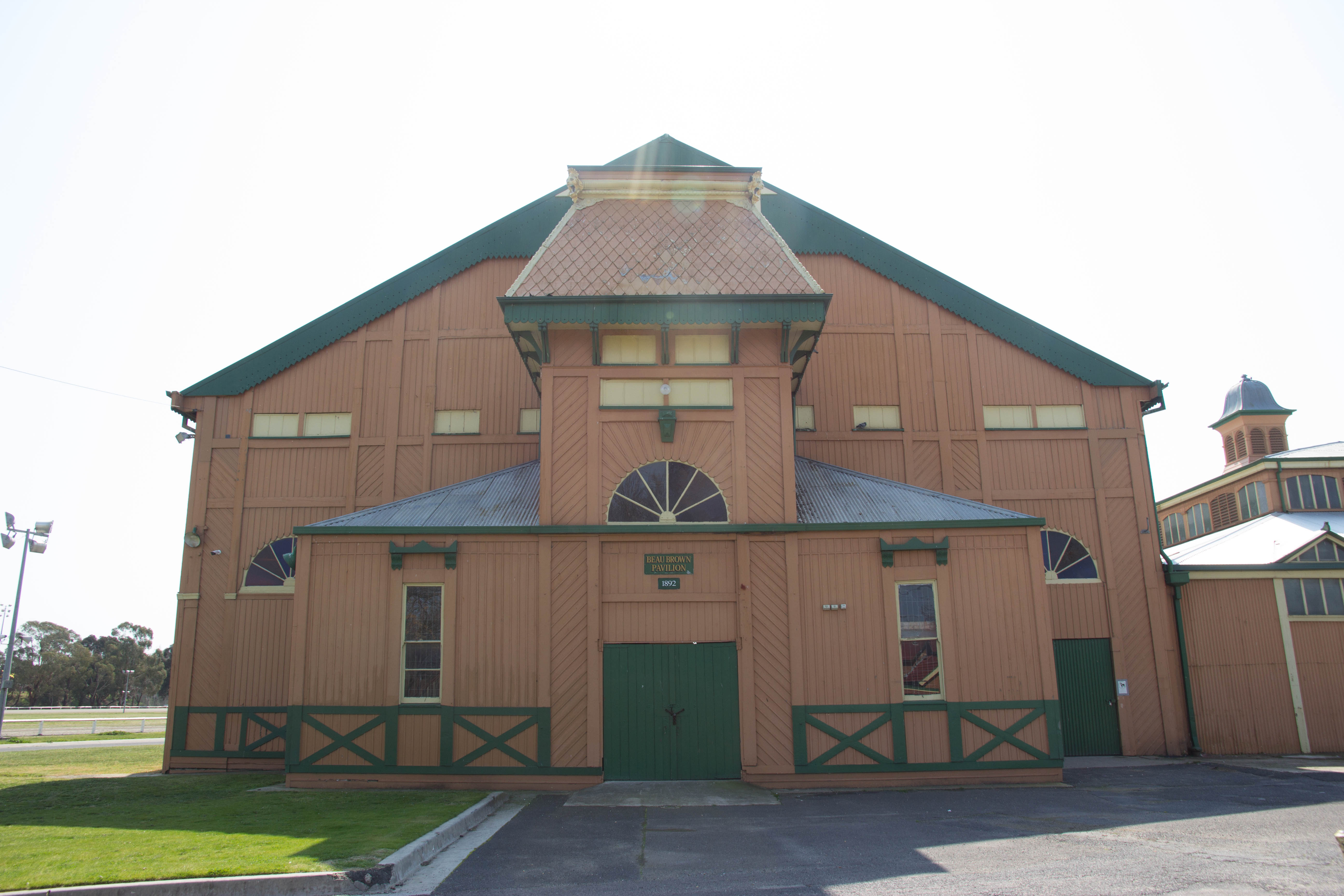
The pavilion at the Bathurst Showground

The historic Royal Bathurst Show is an Agricultural Show conducted by the Bathurst Agricultural, Horticultural & Pastoral Association since 1860 and promotes excellence in agriculture, industry and rural competition, encourages learning and provides entertainment. It is one of the largest regional shows in NSW. The show has been operating continuously from the present site since 1878 and attendances now typically reach 25,000 people over a three-day period. In 1994 approval was received from the Queen to use the title Royal Bathurst Show.

The Central Tablelands region is a location with a growing reputation as a producer of gourmet food and drink. A non-profit volunteer based organisation known as Bre&d was established in 2001 to encourage visitors and residents to experience the regions produce. The organisation operates the monthly Bathurst Farmers Markets held at the Bathurst Showground as well as the Bre&d Under the Stars and Bre&d on the Bridge annual events that showcase the regions chefs and local produce. The events are held on the historic Denison Bridge with the Macquarie River passing below.

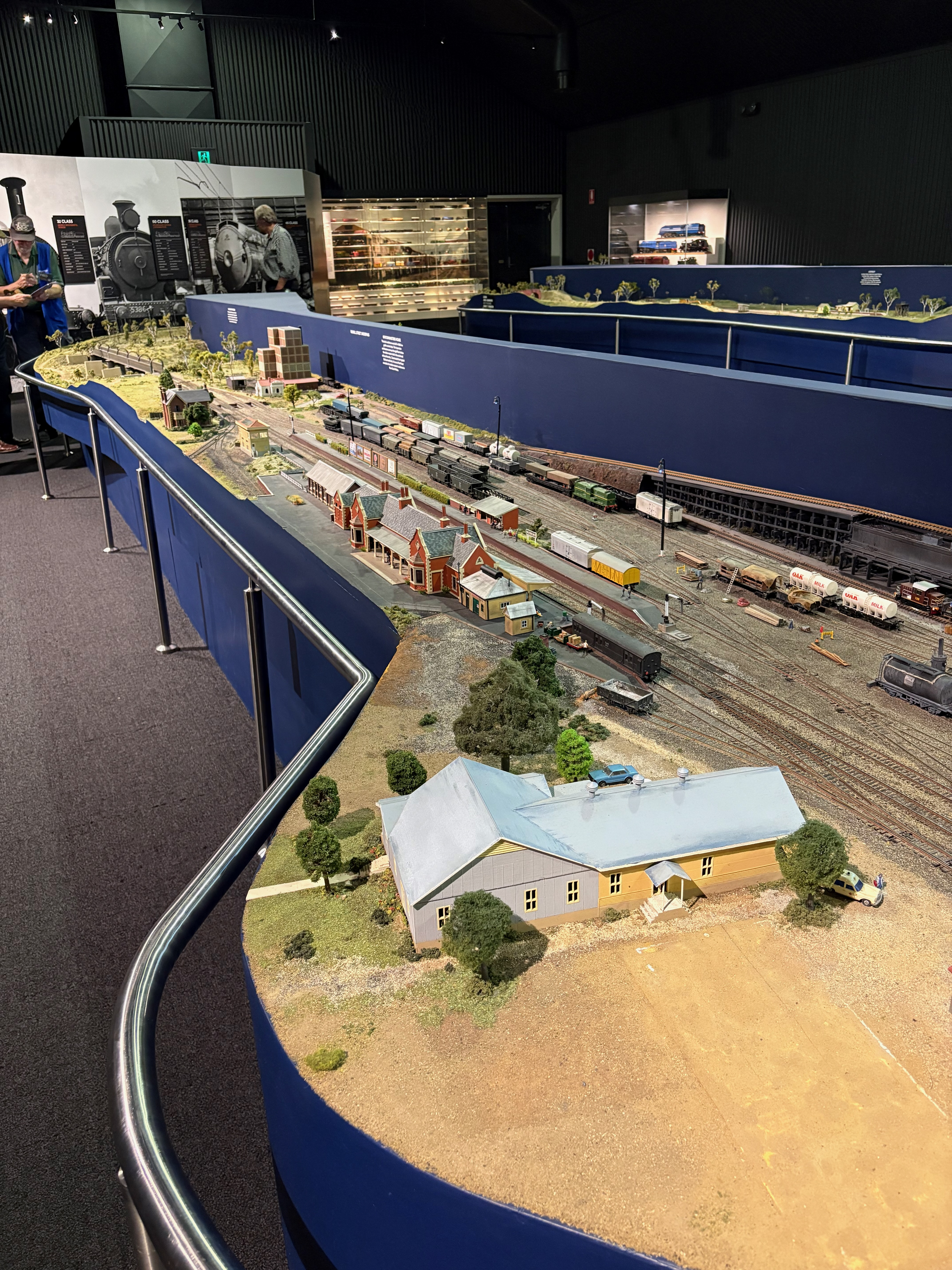
Bathurst HO Model Rail Museum

In 2020, the Bathurst Rail Museum was opened in the Railway Institute building. Bathurst local Ben Chifley, while employed as an engine driver, was an instructor at the Institute. The Museum claims to host the largest public HO scale model railway in Australia. The layout, built and maintained by volunteers, and currently the dimensions of a tennis court, models the Great Western Line from Tarana to Bathurst in the 1960s.

== Attractions ==
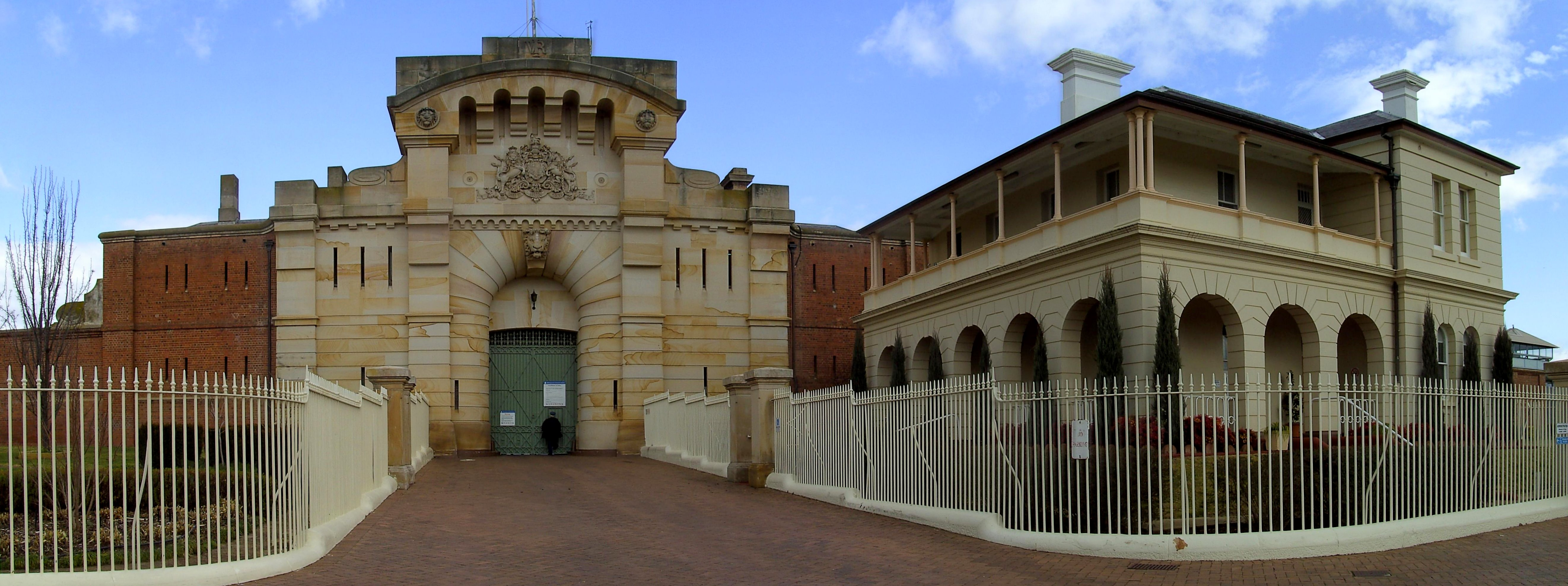
Bathurst Gaol

- Yerranderie Regional Park
- Evans Crown Nature Reserve
- Abercrombie House
- National Motor Racing Museum
- Trunkey Creek
- Abercrombie Caves
- Bathurst Regional Art Gallery

== Education ==
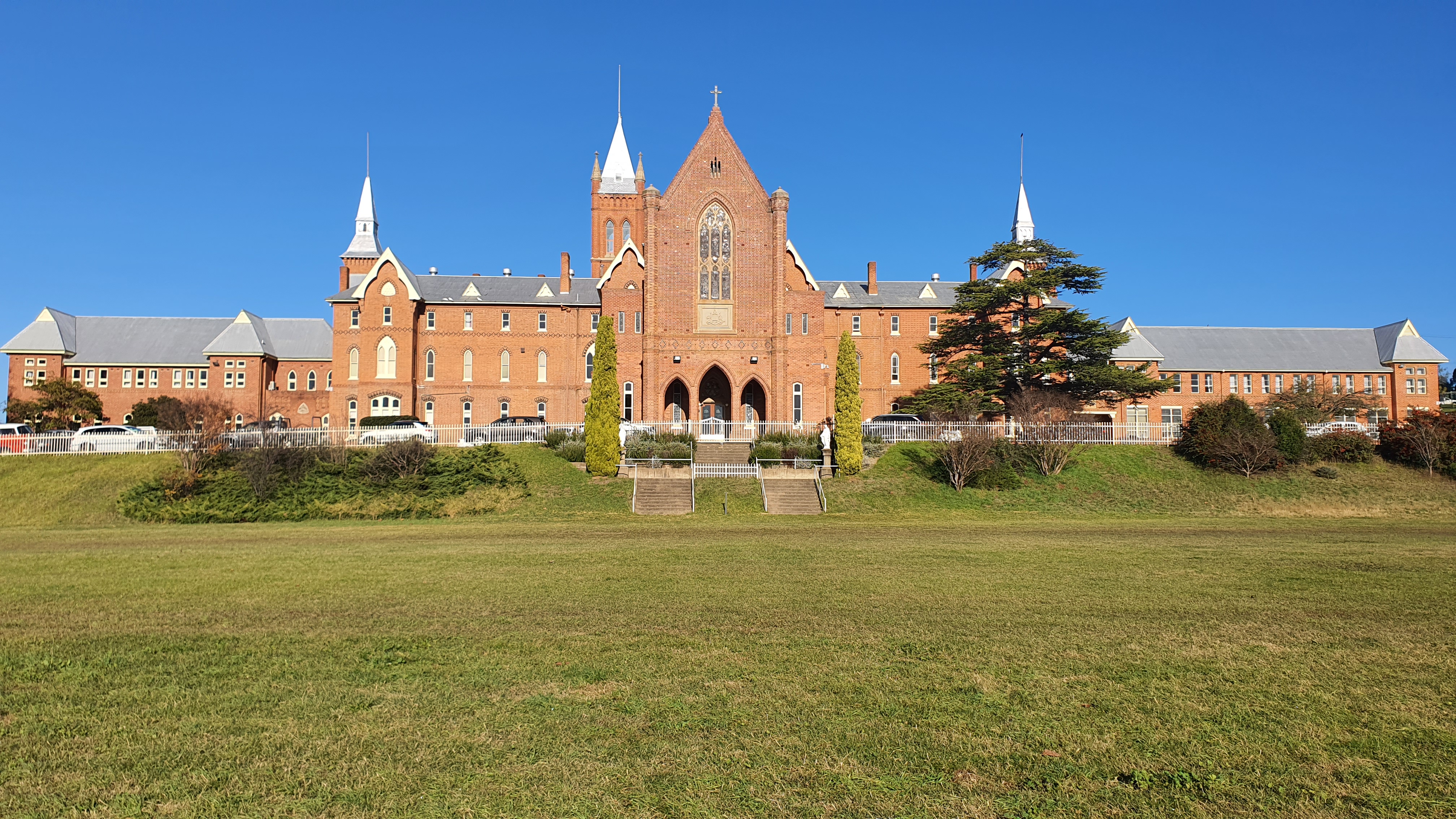
St Stanislaus' College

Education is Bathurst's largest industry with 60 education facilities that represent 7.6% of Bathurst's Gross Regional Product. The education range covers all levels including university, TAFE, secondary, primary both public and private. 12.1% of the local population are employed in the education sector; the NSW state average is 7.0%.

Bathurst is the headquarters for Charles Sturt University which has a major campus in Bathurst, complementing campuses in Wagga Wagga, Albury, Dubbo, Orange, Canberra, and Goulburn. It is a major provider of regional tertiary education. The university is renowned for its reputation in journalism.

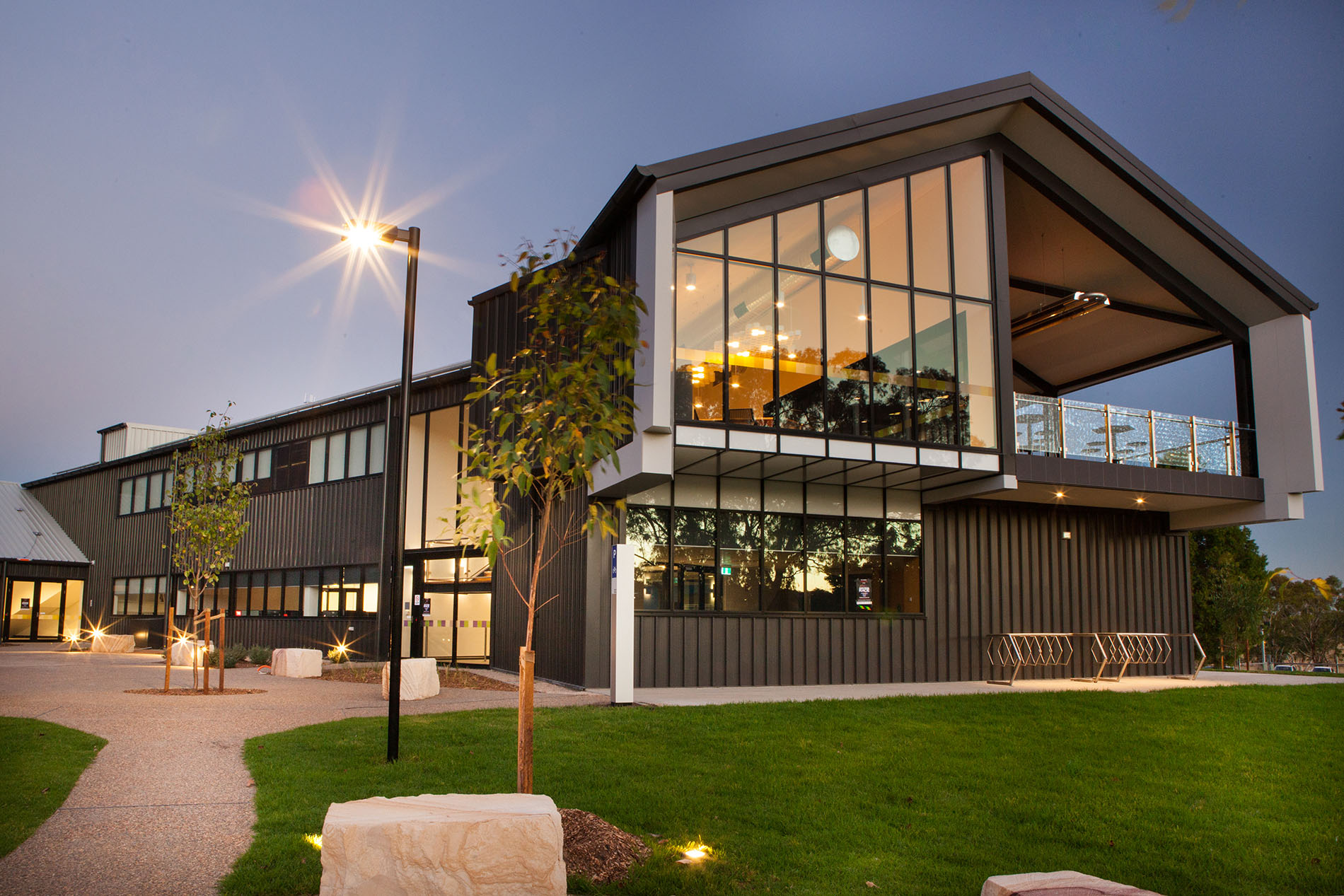
Charles Sturt University

The Western Institute of TAFE has two campuses in Bathurst. The college has 12 Industry Training Divisions including arts and media, building and construction, business services, computing and information services, engineering services, rural and mining services and tourism and hospitality.Western Sydney University has a clinical education facility, housed within Bathurst Hospital, open since June 2010 for its fourth year medical students.

Bathurst has numerous primary schools and high schools, both public and private. These include the Scots All Saint's College, Denison College of Secondary Education, MacKillop College, St Stanislaus College.

== Transport ==
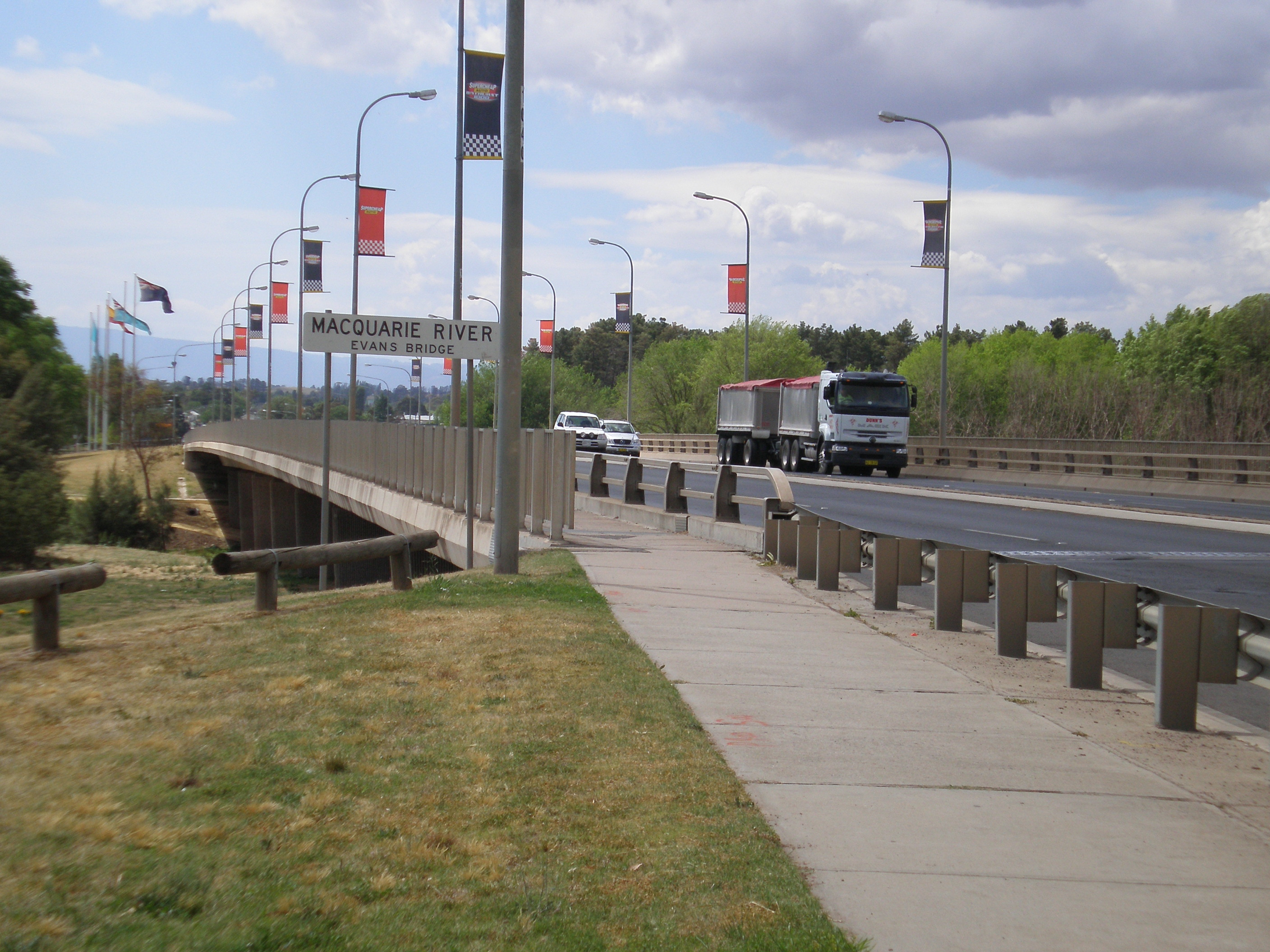
Evans Bridge, crossing the Macquarie River, connecting Kelso and Bathurst.

=== Roads ===
Bathurst is a regional highway hub. Several roads including the Great Western Highway, Mid-Western Highway, Mitchell Highway, O'Connell Road to Oberon and Bathurst-Ilford Road all start in Bathurst. Other major roads in Bathurst include Durham Street, Eleven Mile Drive, and Bradwardine Road.

=== Rail ===
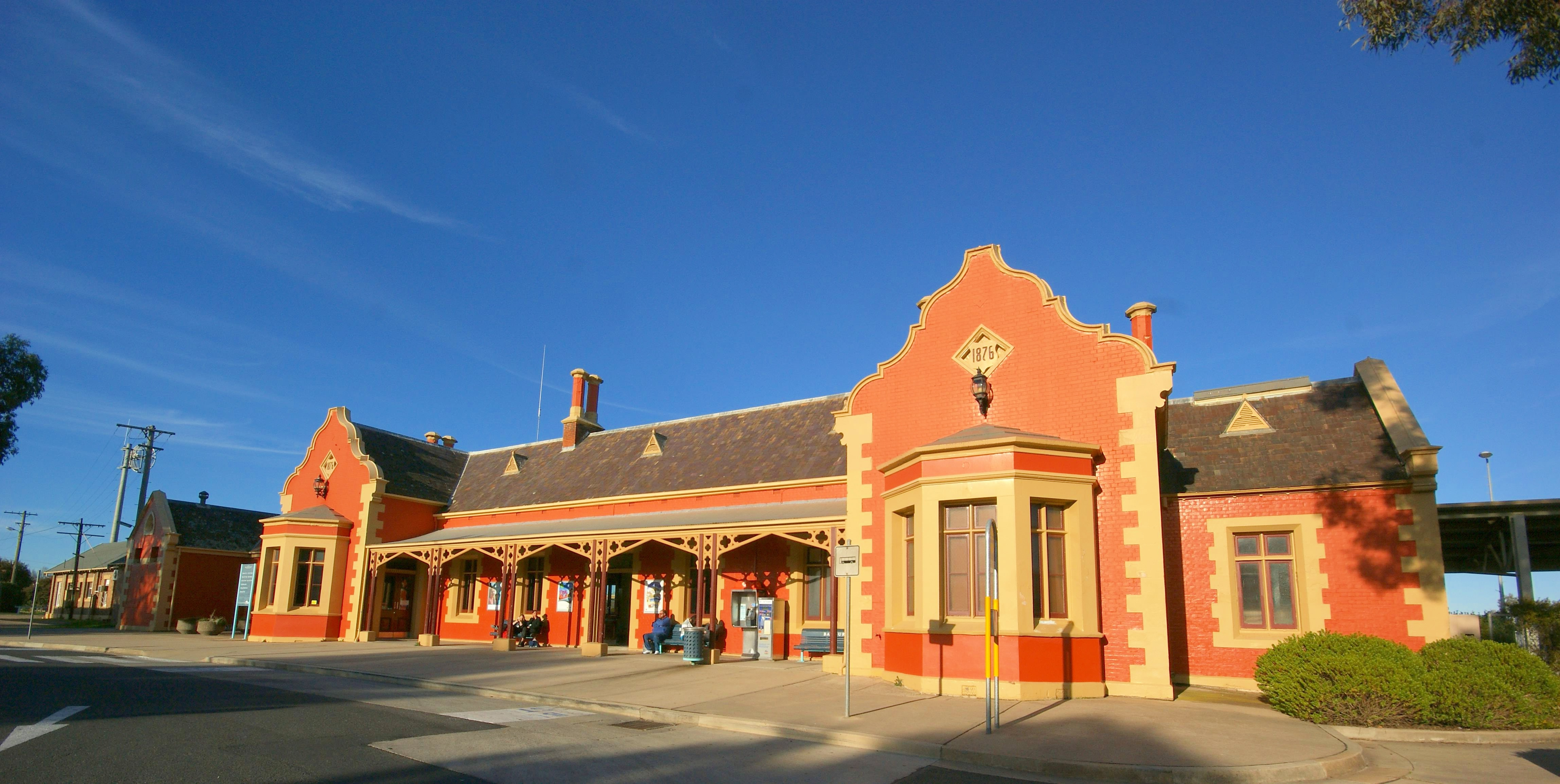
Bathurst railway station

Bathurst railway station is located ten minutes' walk from the city centre. It is serviced by daily NSW TrainLink trains and buses east to Lithgow then on to Sydney, north west to Dubbo, west to Parkes and south to Cootamundra.

=== Bus ===
Local bus services provided by Bathurst Buslines operate in the surrounding suburbs of Bathurst, with a bus interchange in Howick Street, opposite Armada Bathurst.

Interurban bus services are provided between Bathurst and Lithgow, Bathurst and Orange, and Bathurst and Oberon. A long-distance coach service is operated between Bathurst and Sydney by Australia Wide Coaches.

== Bathurst region development ==
Bathurst's location close to Sydney and on major highways placed it in a desirable position for decentralisation plans by various governments over the years. Several decentralisation plans relating to Bathurst can be identified:

1. in the late 1940s the Curtin Federal Government encouraged the NSW government to establish regions for regional development purposes. Bathurst and Orange were grouped as the Mitchell Region and established as such in 1945. Later the new Menzies federal government dropped support for the regionalisation scheme however the NSW Government continued, albeit modestly, promoting the regionalisation plan.
2. on 3 October 1972 the Federal Government and New South Wales Governments agreed on a plan to introduce a decentralisation policy to various regions in NSW. This plan included a pilot growth centre in the Bathurst-Orange area and was known as the Bathurst Orange Development Corporation (BODC). Initially 13 areas were proposed, however only four were established with Bathurst-Orange and Albury-Wodonga the only in rural regional NSW. The project would comprise domestic, commercial and industrial developments and would develop the area economically, raise new capital investment, bring population to the region and create new employment opportunities. A statutory body was established by Act of Parliament to manage the BODC. The Act was effective from 1 July 1974. A key focus for the BODC was the purchase of land and to that end it purchased 209 properties around Bathurst valued at $22 million. A decline in regional trade as a result of changing global trends and the international depression and the oil shock during the mid-70s resulted in a declining interest by developers in new facilities. The BODC progressively received less and less government support and suffered liquidity problems. Several large new employers moved to Bathurst as part of the BODC initiative, including Devro, Uncle Bens (now Mars), and Omya Minerals.
3. In 1989, the Greiner government promoted the regional hub strategy that encouraged regional centres that had natural growth potential. Bathurst was one of 12 regional hub locations in NSW that received support funding for development of university expansions, administration, health and general education sectors.
4. In 2010, a new plan to attract residents and therefore business to regional centres was launched. The marketing name is EVO Cities, a name coming from Energy, Vision and Opportunity (EVO). Seven NSW regional cities including Bathurst have developed the EVO City strategy at a local government level with funding provided by the NSW and Federal governments. The strategy largely relies on advertising in capital city markets to promote residents to relocate to the EVO Cities.

== Notable people ==
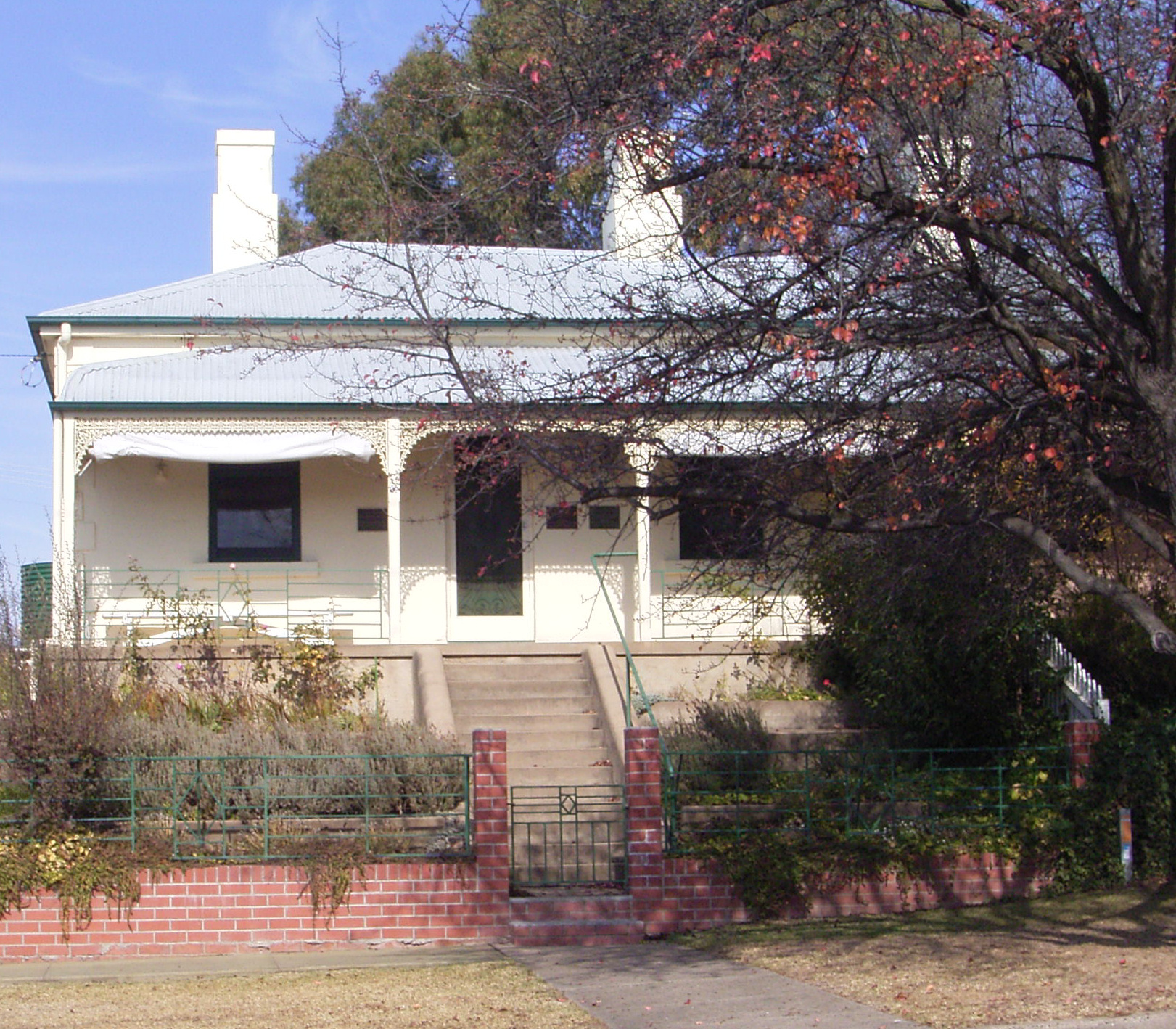
Home of Ben Chifley, now a museum, in Busby Street Bathurst

- Charles Bean (1879–1968), barrister, journalist, war correspondent and historian, born in Bathurst.
- George Bonnor, (1855–1912), Australian cricketer.
- Annabella Boswell, (1826–1914), diarist was born at Yarrows in the Bathurst plains.
- Brian Booth (1933–2023), test cricketer and Olympic hockey player.
- Keith Bremner (1947–2013), Australian Paralympic Shooter.
- Reg Campbell (1923–2008), Australian portrait painter.
- Ben Chifley (1885–1951), Australian Prime Minister and Bathurst loco driver.
- Brendan Cowell (1976–), actor, screenwriter and director.
- William Cox (1764–1837), engineer of the first road from Sydney to Bathurst.
- Andrew Denton (1960–), television presenter and producer, host of Enough Rope.
- Robert Gordon Edgell (1866–1948), founder of Edgells food processing.
- George William Evans (1780–1852), first European to reach site of Bathurst.
- Beatrice Grimshaw (1870–1953), noted for her writing about New Guinea, buried in Catholic portion of cemetery.
- Gus Kelly (1890–1967), Member for Bathurst for 38 years.
- Janelle Lindsay OAM (1976–), Australian Paralympic tandem cycling pilot.
- Kim Mackay (1902–1960), British Labour politician.
- Scott McGregor (1957–), television presenter, actor.
- James Thomas Morisset (1780–1852), was appointed Commandant at Bathurst in 1823.
- Matt Naylor (1983–), Australian field hockey player.
- Peter O'Malley (1965–), Australian professional golfer.
- Tommy Raudonikis (1950–2021), Australian rugby league player and coach.
- Mark Renshaw (1982–), Australian professional cyclist, born and educated in Bathurst
- Beau Robinson (1986–), Australian rugby union player.
- Rodney Keft (A.K.A. Rodney Rude) (1943–), Australian comedian.
- Zac Saddler (1999–), Australian rugby league player.
- Harry Siejka (1992–), Australian rugby league player.
- James Stewart (archaeologist) (1913–1962), archaeologist and academic.
- Gordon Neil Stewart (1912–1999), author and journalist.
- Major General William Stewart (1769–1854), Lieutenant Governor of New South Wales from 1825 to 1827.
- Tim Storrier (1949–), Australian painter, winner of the 2012 Archibald Prize. Resident of Bathurst 1995–2013.
- Sir Francis Bathurst Suttor (1839–1915), a local politician and pastoralist.
- William Henry Suttor, (1805–1877), a local politician and pastoralist.
- Archie Thompson (1978–), A-League record-holding footballer.
- Charles Turner (1862–1944), Australian cricketer.
- B. Linden Webb (1884–1968), Methodist minister and pacifist.
- Bluey Wilkinson (1911–1940), Australian speedway rider, Individual World Champion in 1938, known as the Bathurst Burr.
- Windradyne (c. 1788–1835), Wiradjuri Warrior.

== Media ==
=== Print ===
The local daily newspaper is the Western Advocate, published in Bathurst for 150 years. The publication has a circulation of 5,800 copies.

=== Radio stations ===
Bathurst-licensed stations include:

- 2BS FM 95.1 (commercial) – transmitted from the broadcaster's own tower in the northern suburb of Eglinton
- B-Rock FM 99.3 (commercial) – transmitted from the broadcaster's own tower in the Ovens Ranges near Yetholme
- 2MCE-FM 92.3 (community)
- Life FM 100.1 (Christian community) – transmitted from the Bathurst broadcast site Yetholme

National and other stations

- ABC Central West 549 AM
- NewsRadio 98.3
- Radio National 104.3/96.7
- Triple J 101.9/95.9
- ABC Classic 102.7/97.5
- SBS Radio 88.9 MHz – Special Broadcasting Service, (Multicultural)
- Vision Radio (UCB relay) 1629 AM
- Racing Radio 2KY 100.9

Some Orange-based radio stations, including Triple M and hit105.9, also service the Bathurst region.

=== Television stations ===
Television in the town area is transmitted from a tower on Mount Panorama 33°27′01″S 149°32′50″E

- Seven, 7two, 7mate, 7Bravo, 7flix, TVSN and Racing.com (Seven Network owned and operated station channels)
- WIN Television: Nine, 9Gem, 9Go, 9Life and GOLD (Nine affiliated channels)
- Network 10, 10 Drama, 10 Comedy, Nickelodeon, SBN and News24 Regional (Owned and operated station by Network 10)
- ABC TV, ABC Family, ABC Entertains and ABC News (Australian Broadcasting Corporation)
- SBS TV, SBS2, SBS World Movies, SBS Food, NITV and SBS WorldWatch (Special Broadcasting Service)
- Subscription Television services are provided by Foxtel.

Of the three main commercial networks:

- Seven News produces a half-hour local news bulletin for the Central West, airing each weeknight at 6pm. It is produced from local newsrooms in Orange and Dubbo and broadcast from studios in Canberra.
- WIN Television produces a half-hour local news bulletin for the Central West, airing each weeknight at 5:30pm. It is produced from its local newsroom in Orange and broadcast from studios in Wollongong.
- Network 10 produces short news updates of 10 News throughout the day from its Hobart studios.

== Twin cities ==
- Ōkuma, Japan, since 1991
- Iiyama, Japan

== See also ==
- History of infrastructure development in Bathurst a sequence of significant infrastructure building events in the growth of Bathurst
- Bathurst County one of the 141 Lands division areas within NSW, now only used for land titles and geographic surveying
- New South Wales gold rush

== Books ==
- Bathurst Progress Committee, ed. (1893), Bathurst guide: embracing particulars descriptive of the rise and progress of the city and its public institutions including illustrations of the principal buildings, parks and scenery of the district, John Sands
- Salisbury, T; Gresser, P J (1971), Windradyne of the Wiradjuri; martial law at Bathurst in 1824, Wentworth Books, ISBN 0-85587-017-6
- Greaves, Bernard, ed. (1976), The story of Bathurst (3rd ed.), Angus & Robertson, ISBN 0-207-13363-8
- Barker, Theo (1992), A history of Bathurst: The early settlement to 1862, Crawford House Press, ISBN 1-86333-056-9
- Raxworthy, Dorothy Sampson (1993), The making of a settlement: Bathurst Kelso NSW, 1813–1833, D.S. Raxworthy, ISBN 0-646-13920-7
- Barker, Theo (1998), A history of Bathurst: From settlement to city 1862–1914, Crawford House Press in association with Bathurst City Council, ISBN 1-86333-058-5
- Scaysbrook, Jim (2003), Bikes & Bathurst: a history of racing at Bathurst since 1931, Independent Observations, ISBN 0-9581758-0-2
