= Napoleon Reef, New South Wales =

Napoleon Reef New South Wales
- Coordinates: 33°23′30″S 149°44′50″E
- Population: 130 (2021 census)
- Postcode(s): 2795
- Elevation: 877 m (2,877 ft)
- Location: 194 km (121 mi) NW of Sydney; 52 km (32 mi) WNW of Lithgow; 23 km (14 mi) NE of Bathurst
- LGA(s): Bathurst Region
- State electorate(s): Bathurst
- Federal division(s): Calare
Localities around Napoleon Reef:
Clear Creek	Winburndale	Winburndale
Glanmire	Napoleon Reef	Yetholme
Glanmire	Walang	Walang

Napoleon Reef is a locality in the Bathurst Region, New South Wales, Australia.

Gold mining commenced at Napoleon Reef in late 1863. In early 1865, black sand, that had been ignored as rubbish, was found to contain quantities of both gold and silver.
