= Clear Creek, New South Wales =

Clear Creek
- Town
- Coordinates: 33°19′24″S 149°42′4″E
- Country: Australia
- State: New South Wales
- LGA: Bathurst Region
- Location: 199 km (124 mi) NW of Sydney; 60 km (37 mi) WNW of Lithgow; 14 km (8.7 mi) NE of Bathurst

Government
  - State electorate: Bathurst
  - Federal division: Calare
- Elevation: 773 m (2,536 ft)

Population
  - Total: 115 (2021 census)
- Postcode: 2795
Localities around Clear Creek
Peel	Limekilns	Winburndale
Peel	Clear Creek	Winburndale
Yarras	Glanmire	Napoleon Reef

Clear Creek is a locality in the Bathurst Region, New South Wales, Australia.

A rare tornado passed through the town of Clear Creek, along with the village of Meadow Flat, on the 30th of September 2021, resulting in damage to the properties in the town and injuries to three people, one of which required observation at Orange Hospital.
