= Great Western Highway =

Highway in New South Wales, Australia

Great Western Highway Broadway, Parramatta Road, Church Street New South Wales
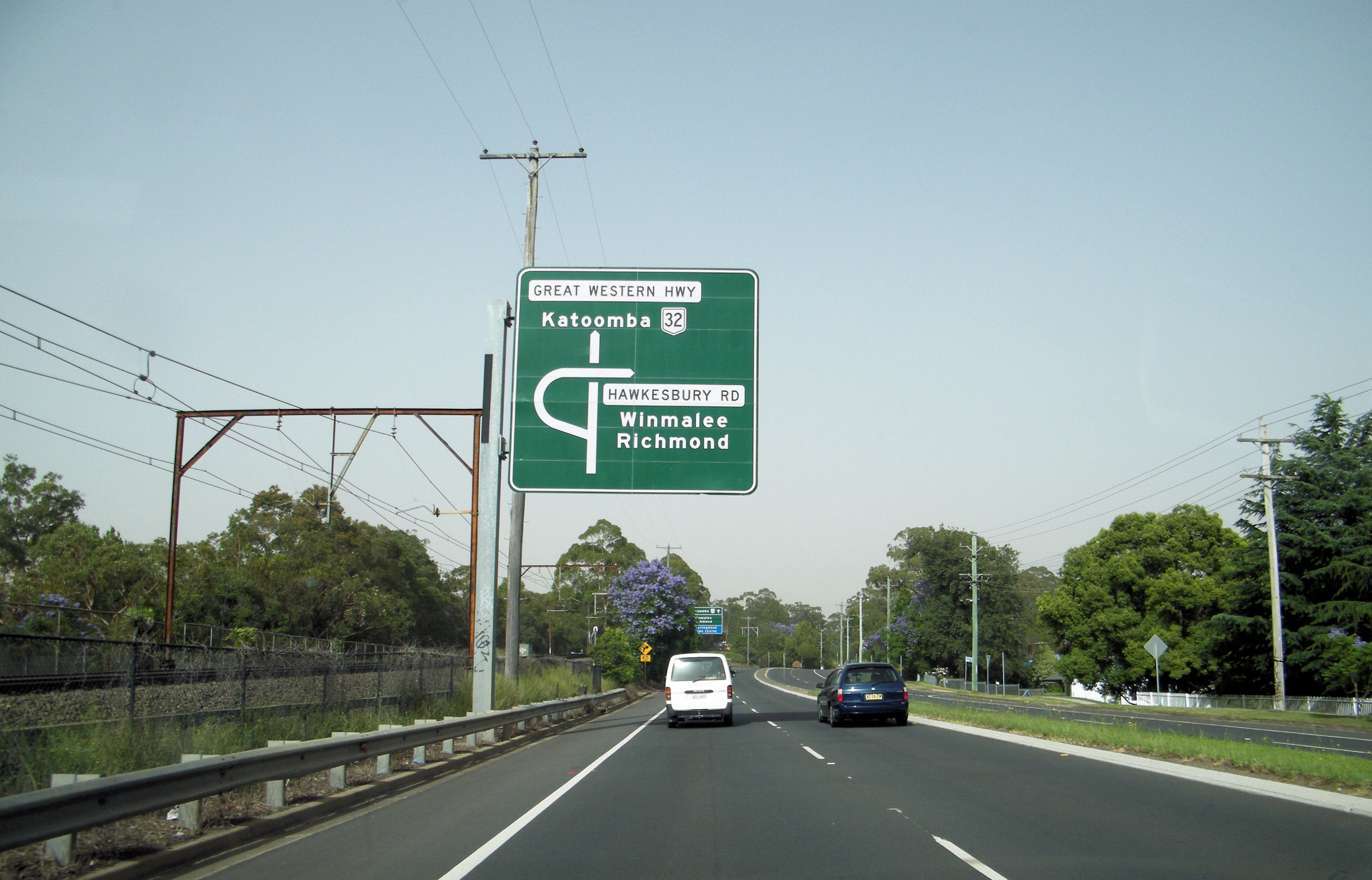
- Travelling westbound on Great Western Highway at Springwood

General information
- Type: Highway
- Length: 202 km (126 mi)
- Gazetted: August 1928 (as Main Road 5)
- Route number(s): A22 (2013–present) (Chippendale–Summer Hill); A44 (2013–present) (Ashfield–Emu Plains); A32 (2013–present) (Lapstone–Bathurst)
- Former route number: see Former route allocations

Major junctions
- East end: Railway Square; Haymarket, Sydney
- Liverpool Road; Wattle Street; M4 East; Centenary Drive; St Hilliers Road; Cumberland Highway; Westlink M7; The Northern Road; Western Motorway; Bells Line of Road; Castlereagh Highway; Mid-Western Highway
- West end: Mitchell Highway; Bathurst, New South Wales

Location(s)
- Major settlements: Petersham, Ashfield, Parramatta, Eastern Creek, St Marys, Penrith, Emu Plains, Glenbrook, Lawson, Katoomba, Mount Victoria, Lithgow

Highway system
- Highways in Australia; National Highway • Freeways in Australia; Highways in New South Wales

Great Western Highway is a 202-kilometre-long (126 mi) state highway in New South Wales, Australia. From east to west, the highway links Sydney with Bathurst, on the state's Central Tablelands. The highway also has local road names between the Sydney city centre and Parramatta, being: Broadway from Haymarket to Chippendale, Parramatta Road from Chippendale to Parramatta, and Church Street through Parramatta.

== Route ==
The eastern terminus of Great Western Highway is at Railway Square, at the intersection of Broadway with Quay Street, in the inner-city suburb of Haymarket and just south of the Sydney CBD. From Railway Square, the highway follows Broadway south and west, to the intersection with City Road (Princes Highway), where the highway changes name to Parramatta Road and heads generally west towards Parramatta. Hume Highway (Liverpool Road) branches south-west at Summer Hill/Ashfield, and a short distance further west the majority of traffic is diverted off the highway onto M4 Western Motorway via the WestConnex tunnel at Ashfield. A short distance further west, on the northern fringes of Ashfield, the City West Link arterial road ends at a major junction with the highway at Frederick Street (which proceeds south to join Hume Highway).

The highway continues west as Parramatta Road, with a major intersection at Homebush West with the A3 arterial road. Although the A3 road is called "Centenary Drive" in this area, the on-/off-ramps are separately named Marlborough Road, carrying on the name of the surface road that was replaced by Centenary Drive. Further west, on the boundary between Lidcombe and Auburn, the highway intersects the A6 arterial road (St Hillier's Road / Silverwater Road).

Just south of Parramatta, the highway meets Woodville Road and continues west onto an on-ramp for M4 Western Motorway, while the highway-designated route turns sharply to the north along Church Street, before turning west again at the southern fringe of the Parramatta central business district, continuing west across western metropolitan Sydney to Penrith, north of the central business district, where it crosses the Nepean River via the 1867 Victoria Bridge. At Leonay, M4 Western Motorway reconnects with the highway as it begins its ascent into the Blue Mountains. It intersects with Darling Causeway at Mount Victoria which heads north to connect with Bells Line of Road. From Mount Victoria, the highway descends via Victoria Pass into the Hartley Valley and then passes through the western suburbs of Lithgow where it is joined by the Chifley Road, which links eastward back to Bells Line of Road. The highway continues generally west, intersecting with Castlereagh Highway west of Marrangaroo, and crosses Coxs River to ascend the Great Dividing Range to reach its highest point (at 1,170 metres (3,840 ft) just east of Yetholme) and over the western ridge of the Sydney basin before dropping into the Macquarie Valley to reach its western terminus at Bathurst, at the junction of the Mitchell and Mid-Western Highways.

At numerous points along its journey, the highway transverses or is transversed by the Main Western railway line. Major river crossings occur east of Emu Plains (Nepean), near Wallerawang (Coxs), and east of Bathurst (Macquarie).

It consists of two of Australia's most historic roads – Parramatta Road, and the full length of the former Great Western Road, from Parramatta to Bathurst.

== History ==
=== Colonial establishment ===
==== Sydney CBD to Parramatta and Penrith ====
Initial travel between Sydney and the settlement of Parramatta was by water along the Parramatta River. Sometime between 1789 and 1791 an overland track was made to provide an official land route between the two settlements. Parramatta Road dates to the 1792 formation of a route linking Sydney to the settlement of Parramatta, formalised under the direction of Surveyor-General Augustus Alt in 1797. Parramatta Road became one of the colony's most important early roadways, and for many years remained one of Sydney's premier thoroughfares. By 1810, Parramatta Road had officially open to traffic and was financed during a large portion of the 1800s by a toll, with toll booths located at what now is Sydney University and the Duck River.

From Parramatta to Penrith, a road along the current alignment of the Great Western Highway (except at Prospect and Penrith) was constructed soon after completion of the Sydney–Parramatta Road.

==== Emu Plains to Mount Victoria ====
In 1813, acting on the instructions of Governor of New South Wales Lachlan Macquarie, Gregory Blaxland, William Lawson and William Wentworth led an 1813 expedition that travelled west from Emu Plains and, by staying to the ridges, were able to confirm the existence of a passable route directly west from Sydney across the Blue Mountains. The existence of other, less direct routes had been known as far back as 1797, but due to the need to prevent convicts from believing that escape from the hemmed-in Sydney region was possible, knowledge of the expeditions confirming the existence of routes across the Blue Mountains was suppressed. Blaxland, Lawson and Wentworth travelled as far west as the point they named Mount Blaxland, 25 kilometres (16 mi) southwest of where Lithgow now stands. From this point they were able to see that the worst of the almost impenetrable terrain of the Blue Mountains was behind them, and that there were easy routes available to reach the rolling countryside they could see off to the west.

==== Mount Victoria to Bathurst ====
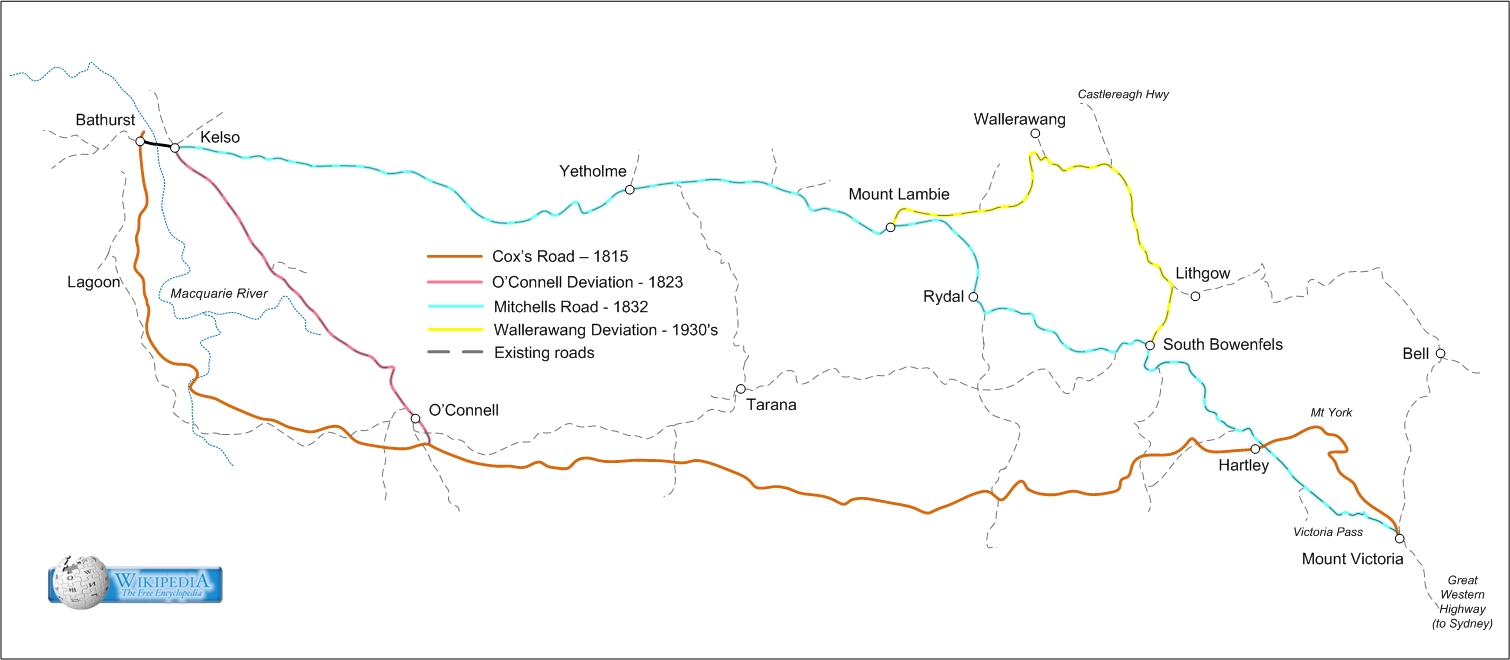
Diagram showing road routes Mount Victoria to Bathurst section of the Sydney to Bathurst Road – Cox's Road 1815, O'Connell Deviation 1823, Mitchell's Road 1832, and Wallerawang Deviation 1930's.

Macquarie then despatched Surveyor George Evans to follow Blaxland, Lawson and Wentworth's route and to push further west until he reached arable land. Evans travelled west until he reached the Fish River, and followed it downstream until he reached the site of Bathurst. Within a year, Macquarie commissioned William Cox to construct a road west from Emu Plains, following Evans' route, and this road was finished in 1815. Macquarie himself travelled across it soon after completion, established and named Bathurst, and named the road the Great Western Road.

The section of the Great Western Road as far west as Mount Victoria, with a small number of minor deviations, is still in use today as part of the Great Western Highway. West of Mount Victoria, Evans' route has been superseded, chiefly by Mitchell's new route constructed between 1832 and 1836.

=== Route development ===
Between present-day Flemington and Dog Trap Road (now Woodville Road), Parramatta Road travelled in a wide arc up to 1.25 miles (2.01 km) south of the present route, to avoid marshy areas around Haslams Creek and Duck River. Continuing due west from Flemington, it crossed Duck River near the present Mona Street bridge, turning north near the present Granville Park to finish at George Street in Parramatta, between Pitt and Church Streets. This was deviated circa 1840 to follow the present route. Few traces of the original route remain.

At Mount Victoria, at the western edge of the Blue Mountains, the route of Cox's road turned north to Mount York, from where it descended into the Hartley Valley. This pass was the major piece of engineering on the original route, and when Macquarie travelled the new road in 1815, he named it Cox's Pass in honour of the builder. From the foot of Mount York the road resumed its westerly direction to where Hartley now stands. However, from here it ran via the present-day Glenroy, Mount Blaxland, Cut Hill Road, Pitts Corner, Phils Falls, Mount Olive Road, Carlwood Road and Sidmouth Valley to a point 2 kilometres (1.2 mi) south of O'Connell. From here it continued westward, not crossing the Fish River, but crossing Campbells River 1,500 metres (4,900 ft) north of the present bridge at The Lagoon and ascending to another ridgeline where it turned north to Gormans Hill, to reach the future site of Bathurst from the south, not the east.

For the first one hundred years after this ceased to be the route of the Great Western Road it remained trafficable, but the destruction of the bridge at Phil's Falls on the Fish River in 1930 meant it was no longer a through route, and parts became untrafficable. However, most of this route remains in existence as a series of local roads.

The original route had only been in existence for eight years when, in 1823, Assistant Surveyor James McBrian identified an improved route on the approaches to Bathurst. This route turned north 2 kilometres (1.2 mi) south of O'Connell to run northwest to where Kelso is now located, then west across the Macquarie River into Bathurst. The section from south of O'Connell to Kelso is now part of the Bathurst-Oberon Road, and from Kelso into central Bathurst still remains as part of Great Western Highway.

When Major Thomas Mitchell was appointed as Surveyor-General in 1828, one of the first matters to which he turned his attention was the improvement of the Great Western Road. Mitchell's attention was focussed on providing a more direct and easily graded route for the Great Western Road. To this end, he surveyed a route running northwest from Hartley via Mt Walker to Meadow Flat, crossing the Great Dividing Range at Mount Lambie, then running in an almost straight line westward via Browns Hill to Kelso, to meet the pre-existing road. This road remains in existence – from Mount Lambie west it remains as the route of the current highway (with deviations) but the section adjacent to Cox's River was inundated by the construction of Lake Lyell for Wallerawang Power Station in the late 1970s.

Mitchell was also concerned to improve the worst sections of the road, which were the climb from the Cumberland Plain, on which Sydney sits, and the descent of Mount York, down the western side of the Blue Mountains.

In improving the eastern ascent Mitchell adhered largely to Cox's route, which follows the southern side of an east-falling gully to reach the plateau at where Blaxland is now located. However, he engaged Scottish engineer David Lennox to build a stone arch bridge, now the Lennox Bridge, across the mouth of a particularly deep side gully. This route, known as Mitchell's Pass, was completed in 1833 and superseded what is now called Old Bathurst Road, located to the north of the route. The Mitchell's Pass and Lennox Bridge served as the main route to the Blue Mountains for 93 years until 1926, when the Great Western Highway was re-routed via sections of the former Lapstone Zig Zag including the Knapsack Viaduct.

After protracted arguments first with Governor Ralph Darling and then his successor Richard Bourke, and ignoring orders, Mitchell surveyed, designed and had built what is now known as Victoria Pass, where the highway drops from the Blue Mountains into the Hartley Valley. Midway down the road had to be supported on a causeway formed by massive stone buttressed walls, where a narrow ridge connects two large bluffs. This ridge had to be widened and raised to give the highway a route from the upper to the lower bluff. Mitchell cut terraces into the sides of these bluffs to form a passage for the road. It is a testimony of Mitchell's vision and engineering skill that this route, almost unchanged, and using his 1832 stonework, is still in use. Because this pass brought the road into the Hartley Valley several kilometres south of the Mount York descent, it necessitated a new route as far west as Hartley to meet Cox's Road. This also is still in use as part of the highway.

In 1929 the Main Roads Board deviated the route north from Old Bowenfels to Marrangaroo, using Trunk Road 55 (Mudgee Road, today Castlereagh Highway). From Marrangaroo a new road was built westward, running south of Wallerawang to meet Mitchell's 1830 deviation immediately east of Mount Lambie. This route avoids the long, steep gradients either side of Cox's River, which were the main drawback of Mitchell's route.

Great Western Highway today therefore consists of Parramatta Road to Parramatta, the Great Western Road to Emu Plains, Coxs Road to Hartley (other than Mitchell's deviations at Lapstone and Mount York), Mitchell's route from Hartley to Old Bowenfels, the Main Roads Board route from Old Bowenfels to Mount Lambie, Mitchell's road from Mount Lambie to Kelso, and McBrian's road from Kelso to central Bathurst.

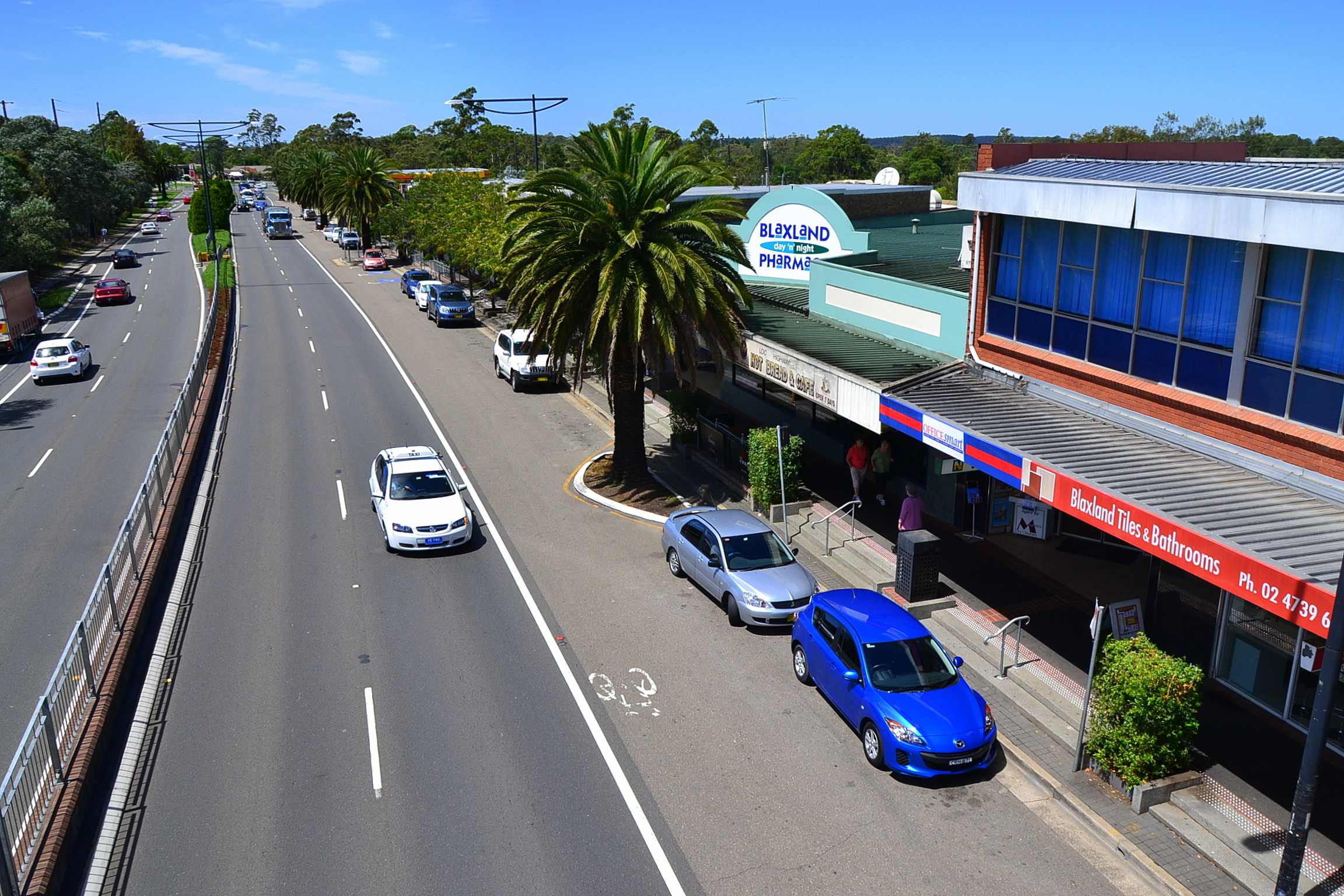
Great Western Highway at Blaxland, New South Wales

=== Road classification ===
The passing of the Main Roads Act of 1924 through the Parliament of New South Wales provided for the declaration of Main Roads, roads partially funded by the State government through the Main Roads Board (later Transport for NSW). Great Western Highway was declared (as Main Road No. 5) on 8 August 1928, from the interchange with Parramatta Road and City Road in the City of Sydney, via Penrith, Katoomba, and Lithgow to Bathurst; with the passing of the Main Roads (Amendment) Act of 1929 to provide for additional declarations of State Highways and Trunk Roads, this was amended to State Highway 5 on 8 April 1929. Its eastern end was extended to the intersection of Broadway and Wattle Street on 22 February 1967 (part of Sydney's Ring Road 1 at the time). It was extended east again to its current terminus at Railway Square in Haymarket on 22 January 1993.

As the main route for traffic from the Blue Mountains into Sydney was superseded from Great Western Highway to the Western Freeway/Motorway from the 1970s, the definition of Great Western Highway as State Highway 5 outside inner Sydney remained virtually untouched, until the western extension of Western Freeway from Emu Plains to Lapstone in June 1993, resulting in a roughly-2km gap between the beginning of the motorway and the interchange with Russell Street where the highway recommences.

The passing of the Roads Act 1993 updated road classifications and the way they could be declared within New South Wales. Under this act, Great Western Highway today retains its declaration as Highway 5, from the intersection of Broadway and Quay Streets at Railway Square in Haymarket to the interchange with M4 Western Motorway at Leonay, then from the end of Western Motorway at the interchange with Governors Drive at Lapstone to Bathurst.

=== 21st century ===
In March 2026, Mitchell's Causeway and Victoria Pass were found to be unsafe and were closed indefinitely by Transport for NSW. Traffic was diverted at Mount Victoria via the Darling Causeway and Bells Line of Road rejoining the Great Western Highway at Bowenfels. The government subsequently announced that Mitchell's Causeway would be closed for at least three months. In May 2026, two consortia led by Gamuda and Seymour Whyte were shortlisted to rebuild the causeway.

As of June 2026, the state government projects that Victoria Pass will reopen between April and June 2027, they also decided to extend the small business support package to $20 million. Seymour Whyte were selected as the contractors to rebuild this bridge.

== Improvements ==
=== During 19th century ===
The first recorded major improvement to the route of Great Western Highway was the construction in 1806 of ten bridges along Parramatta Road.

In attempts to improve the gradient of the descent from the Blue Mountains plateau to the floor of the Hartley Valley, Lawson's Long Alley was opened in 1824. This still did not prove satisfactory and construction of a second deviation, known as Lockyer's Pass, was commenced. However this route was not completed, as its construction was abandoned in favour of construction of Mitchell's route via Victoria Pass.

Originally the Great Western Road crossed the Nepean River at Penrith by means of a ferry adjacent to the Log Cabin Hotel. This was superseded in 1856 by a bridge which was destroyed by a flood in 1857. A second bridge was opened in 1860, and was destroyed by the record flood of 1867. In the same year a new bridge, Victoria Bridge, was nearing completion adjacent to the road crossing, as part of the Penrith-Weatherboard (Wentworth Falls) section of the Main Western Railway. Its deck was modified to accommodate road traffic as well as the single-track railway. This bridge continued in dual use until 1907 when the current steel truss railway bridge was built alongside, and the 1867 bridge was given over solely to road traffic. This bridge remains in use for Great Western Highway. The design of this bridge is almost identical to that of the 1863 Menangle Railway Bridge, also over the Nepean River.

In 1870 the Denison Bridge, a wrought iron truss bridge, was built across the Macquarie River at Bathurst. This replaced an earlier wooden bridge.

=== During early 20th century ===
In the first few years of the 20th century the railway overpasses between Lapstone Hill and Mount Victoria were replaced as part of the duplication of the Main Western railway. These bridges were of brick arch construction. They were in turn replaced in the mid-1950s to obtain the necessary height clearances for overhead wiring for the electrification of the Main Western Railway from Penrith to Bowenfels.

In 1912 Victoria Pass was superseded by Berghofers Pass, which followed a similar route to Victoria Pass, but below it. It was more winding and thus longer, thereby affording a less steep climb. However rapid improvements in motor vehicle performance meant that in 1920 Victoria Pass was rebuilt to become the main route again.

After the ascent of the eastern escarpment by the Main Western Railway was deviated for the second time in 1913 to its current route via Glenbrook Gorge, the Great Western Road was also deviated at this point for a second time in 1926 by the then Main Roads Board, which rerouted it via the disused 1867 stone arch railway viaduct across Knapsack Gully and around the southern side of Lapstone Hill to gain the first plateau in the ascent of the Blue Mountains. As this viaduct had held only a single railway track, its deck was widened in 1939 to its present two lane configuration. The viaduct was closed to motor traffic when the M4 Motorway was extended west from Russell Street to connect to the highway at Lapstone in 1994.

West of Knapsack Gully, although now widened to four lanes, the 1926 route of the highway is still in use. It uses a long stretch of abandoned railway formation – the section from Zig Zag Street to Blaxland station is located on the original 1867 railway alignment. An indication of the need to divert the railway can be gained from the gradient of the highway as it climbs west from Hare Street to Lovett Street.

A number of deviations were built in 1929:

- at Haslams Creek, Lidcombe, to straighten the road and provide a new bridge
- between Warrimoo and Valley Heights, to remove an underpass and an overpass of the railway from the route of the highway
- at Eusdale, Yetholme (in three sections) and Melrose (all west of Meadow Flat), to ease gradients.

In 1930 the level crossing at Bowenfels was replaced by an underpass.

Victoria Pass was upgraded in 1932 to give a constant width of 8.5 m, with a minor deviation built at the foot of the pass.

=== Upgrading since World War II ===
In 1957 a short deviation immediately west of Linden eliminated two narrow overpasses of the railway, both of which had right angle bend approaches from both directions. These bridges would have had to have been replaced in any event to allow for overhead wiring for the electrification to Bowenfels of the Main Western Railway. Such replacements occurred east of Linden, further west of Linden near Bull's Camp, east of Lawson, at Medlow Bath and east of Mount Victoria, and in these cases the replacement bridges were located at a skew angle to eliminate right angle bend approaches, with the earlier bridges left for pedestrian use.

In 1958 the 'Forty Bends’, where the Highway runs along the foot of Hassans Walls approaching Lithgow, were eased. The fact that this section of the highway is on the southern side of a very high escarpment poses severe ice problems during winter, due to the lack of sunlight.

In the early 1960s the highway was deviated east of Leura to cross under the railway at Scott Parade (which was itself part of the former highway route) and run along the north side of the railway to rejoin the previous route at Leura Mall.

In 1967, the highway was deviated to bypass Springwood shopping centre, eliminating two narrow underpasses of the railway from the highway route. The previous route remain in use for local traffic as Macquarie Road. In 1968 a dual carriageway 3 km deviation was opened at Prospect. This replaced the only winding section of the Highway between Parramatta and Penrith. The bypassed section was heritage-listed in 2014 as the best-preserved section of the 1818 alignment.

From the late 1960s to the early 1970s the highway was almost entirely realigned and constructed to three lanes, being deviated as necessary, between Kirkconnell and Glanmire. Ironically this included reinstatement of most of the parts of Major Mitchell's 1830 alignment which had been deviated in 1929 to ease gradients.

This work was extended eastward to Mount Lambie in stages during the late 1980s and early 1990s. A second Cox's River deviation, to replace the 1929 deviation, was completed in 1993, between Marrangaroo and Mount Lambie.

At Katoomba the highway was deviated in 1985 to travel along the eastern side of the railway station, whereas the original alignment crossed the railway via a level crossing at the north end of Katoomba Street and ran along the western side of the railway. Immediately west of where the highway now crosses the railway due to this deviation, the highway was realigned over a distance of 1 km in 2004 to remove the sharp bend at 'Shell Corner'.

In Bathurst, the Denison Bridge (1870) was bypassed in 1991 by a realignment of the Highway where it crosses the Macquarie River into Bathurst city centre. Because of its heritage value it was retained for use by cyclists and pedestrians.

During 1991–1993 a massive cutting was made to improve and widen the alignment of the highway immediately east of Woodford. At the top of the southern side of this cutting can be seen the rudimentary excavation of the rock for Cox's 1815 road. This was severed in 1868 by the construction of the Springwood-Mount Victoria section of the Main Western Railway. The railway itself was deviated at this point in the 1920s when it was duplicated, and a cutting on the original alignment of the railway now forms the top section of the southern face of the highway cutting, the terrace in the face of the cutting being the bed of the original cutting.

In June 1993 the highway route was severed at Emu Plains with the closure to road traffic of the Knapsack Gully Viaduct. This occurred in conjunction with the westward extension of the M4 Motorway from its terminus since 1971 at Russell Street, Emu Plains. This extension connects directly to the highway at Lapstone, bypassing the viaduct. The portion of Great Western Highway west from Russell Street to Mitchells Pass Road is now only used by local traffic to access residential properties. Mitchells Pass, travelling is now one way eastbound between Lennox Bridge and the highway, due to its narrowness. Great Western Highway traffic therefore has to use the M4 between Russell St and Governors Drive.

A major realignment west from Mount Boyce (the highest point on the highway) to eliminate the Soldiers Pinch and other nearby sharp curves was completed in 2002.

=== Duplication and widening ===
From Railway Square to Woodville Road, the highway was widened to its present width when it was reconstructed in reinforced concrete in the 1930s. From Woodville Road west to The Northern Road the highway was widened, generally progressively westward, from the mid-1960s to the late 1970s. This section is a combination of six lanes with median strip, six lanes with wide landscaped median, and four lanes undivided. At The Northern Road in Kingswood the highway reverts to a four lane undivided configuration through Penrith shopping centre, widens to six lanes at the Castlereagh Road intersection, reverts to two lanes west from Castlereagh Road to Russell Street, and is then four lanes undivided with sealed shoulders from Russell Street to the base of Mitchells Pass, where it has been truncated.

Between 1981 and 2015 the NSW Government Roads & Maritime Services duplicated the highway between Leonay and 1 kilometre (0.62 mi) west of Katoomba, generally working westward. This work incorporated the dual carriageway Springwood bypass, opened in 1967.

West of Katoomba, there is a further 1 kilometre (0.62 mi) of dual carriageway on the River Lett Hill, and 16 kilometres (9.9 mi) of dual carriageway from Magpie Hollow Road at Old Bowenfels to Lidsdale State Forest. This was completed as follows:

- Lawson road widening and realignment – completed in 2006
- River Lett Hill – 2014/15
- Old Bowenfels to Bowenfels – completed in sections during the late 1990s
- Bowenfels to Marrangaroo Creek – mid-1970s
- Marrangaroo interchange with the Castlereagh Highway – 1970
- Marrangaroo interchange to Lidsdale State Forest (second Cox's River deviation) – 1993.

Four-lane undivided sections are the 2.5-kilometre (1.6 mi) of Victoria Pass (except for Mitchell's 1832 causeway, which is two lanes), and from Boyd Street in Kelso to the terminus of the highway at its junction with the Mitchell and Mid Western Highways in West Bathurst (parts have a raised median strip).

From Lidsdale State Forest as far west as Glanmire most of the highway is three lanes, with almost continuous overtaking lanes alternating between eastbound and westbound.

=== Controversy ===
Many people, including Aboriginal communities, are complaining about the expansion works. The completed highway will destroy a lot of native lands. There are also fears that the highway could wipe out platypus populations.

== Current projects ==
- Repairs and enhancements from Victoria Pass to Lithgow. The bridge at Victoria Pass is being refurbished and kept as two lane (one each direction.)
- Forty Bends upgrade (from top of River Lett Hill to Magpie Hollow Road) – consists of extension of the length of three-lane pavement and measures to reduce the incidence of black ice in winter
- Duplication from Ashworth Drive to Stockland Drive Kelso (in Bathurst).

== Route numbers ==
Current route numbering is extremely confusing, considering its numerous allocation history, as follows:

- City Road to Hume Highway (Liverpool Road) Ashfield – A22, following the introduction of the 'Metroads' in the late 1990s. Before M5 East was opened in late 2001 it was Metroad 5. After 2001 it was State Route 31.
- Liverpool Road, Ashfield to Wattle Street, Haberfield – no route number since the diversion via Stage 3, City West Link on 2 June 2000.
- Wattle Street, Haberfield to M4 Western Motorway intersection at Strathfield – A44, following the opening of M4 East in July 2019. Before this, it was part of the A4.
- M4 Western Motorway intersection at Strathfield to Russell Street, Emu Plains – A44.
- Russell Street-M4 at Lapstone (Knapsack Viaduct now closed) – no number.
- M4 at Lapstone to intersection of Mitchell and Mid-Western Highways in Bathurst (end of Great Western Highway) – A32.

Route A32 continues along Mitchell Highway as far as Nyngan, then follows Barrier Highway to Giles Corner, 40 kilometres (25 mi) north of Gawler and 80 kilometres (50 mi) northeast of Adelaide, connecting with Horrocks Highway. Mid-Western Highway is designated route A41 from Bathurst to Cowra, then route B64 from Cowra to Hay, connecting with Cobb Highway.

=== Route number changes ===
Great Western Highway was allocated part of National Route 32 (Sydney-Adelaide via Dubbo and Broken Hill) in 1955, with the section from Hume Highway (Liverpool Road) in Summer Hill to Chippendale sharing a concurrency with National Route 31. As sections of Western Freeway opened between the late 1960s and the mid-1980s, National Route 32 was diverted off Great Western Highway and onto the freeway on the opening of each section: from 1974, sections of the highway formerly allocated National Route 32 were allocated State Route 44 instead. Metroad 4 replaced National Route 32 across the entire freeway from Emu Plains to North Strathfield - and Great Western Highway from North Strathfield to Chippendale - in 1992, and Metroad 5 replaced National Route 31 from Summer Hill to Chippendale, also in 1992: Great Western Highway switched between National Route 32 and State Route 44 at Emu Plains, and between State Route 44 and Metroad 4 at North Strathfield, and was also concurrent with Metroad 5 from Summer Hill to Chippendale. Metroad 4 was diverted along City Link West at Haberfield in 2000 and wasn't replaced, while Metroad 5 was diverted along the M5 East Motorway when it opened in 2001, and was replaced with State Route 31, leaving a short gap between Haberfield and Summer Hill that even today remains unallocated.

With the conversion to the newer alphanumeric system in 2013, State Route 44 was replaced with route A44, Metroad 4 was replaced with route A4, and State Route 31 was replaced with route A22. When M4 East opened between Strathfield and Haberfield in July 2019, route M4 was rerouted onto the new motorway. As a result, the section of Great Western Highway/Parramatta Road between Strathfield and Haberfield was designated A44, replacing the previous A4 designation.

=== Former route numbers ===
Great Western Highway has many former route allocations, including former National Route 32. Where and when the former route numbers were implemented are stated below.

Chippendale – Summer Hill:

- National Route 31 (1954–1992)
- Metroad 4 (1992–2000)
- National Route 32 (1955–1992)
- Metroad 5 (1992–2001)
- State Route 31 (2001–2013)
- A22 (2013–present)

Summer Hill – Haberfield:

- National Route 32 (1955–1992)
- Metroad 4 (1992–2000)
- unallocated: (2000–present)

Haberfield – North Strathfield:

- National Route 32 (1955–1992)
- Metroad 4 (1992–2013)
- A4 (2013–2019)
- A44 (2019–present)

North Strathfield – Auburn:

- National Route 32 (1955–1982)
- State Route 44 (1982–2013)
- A44 (2013–present)

Auburn – Clyde:

- National Route 32 (1955–1984)
- State Route 44 (1982–2013)
- A44 (2013–present)

Clyde – Granville:

- National Route 32 (1955–1986)
- State Route 44 (1982–2013)
- A44 (2013–present)

Granville – Mays Hill:

- National Route 32 (1955–1982)
- State Route 44 (1982–2013)
- A44 (2013–present)

Mays Hill – Prospect:

- National Route 32 (1955–1992)
- State Route 44 (1982–2013)
- A44 (2013–present)

Prospect – Eastern Creek:

- National Route 32 (1955–1974)
- State Route 44 (1974–2013)
- A44 (2013–present)

Eastern Creek – Emu Plains:

- National Route 32 (1955–1972)
- unallocated: (1972–1974)
- State Route 44 (1974–2013)
- A44 (2013–present)

Emu Plains – Lapstone (subsumed into Western Freeway in 1993):

- National Route 32 (1955–1993)
- Metroad 4 (1993–2013)
- M4 (2013–present)

Lapstone – Bathurst:

- National Route 32 (1955–2013)
- A32 (2013–present)

== Major junctions ==
LGA	Location	km	mi	Destinations	Notes
Sydney	Haymarket	0.0	0.0	Quay Street (northwest) – Haymarket, Paddy's Markets; George Street (north) – Sydney CBD; Pitt Street (northeast) – Sydney CBD; Lee Street, to Regent Street – Redfern	Railway Square, controlled offset four-way intersection Eastern terminus of highway and route A22; Eastern end of Broadway
Sydney	Chippendale	0.9	0.56	City Road (Princes Highway) (A36) – Newtown, Kogarah, Wollongong, Sydney Airport	Western end of Broadway, eastern end of Parramatta Road
Hawthorne Canal		5.6	3.5	Battle Bridge	
Inner West	Summer Hill	6.3	3.9	Liverpool Road (Hume Highway) (A22) – Chullora, Liverpool, Prestons	Controlled T intersection, route A22 continues southwest along Hume Highway
Inner West	Haberfield	6.8	4.2	M4 East Motorway (M4) – Strathfield, Homebush, Penrith	Westbound access to M4 East Motorway only
Inner West	Haberfield	7.7	4.8	Wattle Street (City West Link) (A4 northeast) – Leichhardt, Sydney, North Sydney; Frederick Street (southwest) – Canterbury	Controlled four-way intersection; eastern terminus of route A44
Iron Cove Creek		8.0	5.0	Bridge over the creek (bridge name unknown)	
Strathfield	Strathfield	11.2	7.0	M4 Western Motorway (M4) – Parramatta, Penrith, Blue Mountains	Controlled T intersection; westbound access to M4 Western Motorway only
Strathfield	Homebush West	13.8	8.6	Marlborough Road, to Centenary Drive (A3) – Mona Vale, Ryde, Lakemba, Blakehurst	
Haslams Creek		16.1	10.0	Haslams Creek Bridge	
Cumberland	Lidcombe	16.7	10.4	Silverwater Road (A6 north) – Silverwater, Carlingford; St Hillers Road (A6 south) – Bankstown, Lucas Heights	
Duck River		18.8	11.7	Bridge over the river (bridge name unknown)	
Parramatta	Clyde	19.3	12.0	James Ruse Drive (north) – Rosehill, Northmead; Berry Street (south) – Clyde	Controlled four-way intersection; one way southbound along Berry Street
Duck Creek		19.6	12.2	Duck Creek Bridge	
Parramatta	Granville	20.7	12.9	Woodville Road (south) – Merrylands; M4 Western Motorway (M4 west) – Penrith, Blue Mountains	Controlled four-way intersection; western end of Parramatta Road, southern end of Church Street
Parramatta	Parramatta	21.5	13.4	Church Street (north) – Parramatta; Parkes Street (east) – Harris Park	Controlled four-way intersection; northern end of Church Street, eastern end of Great Eastern Highway; No access into Parkes Street from Church Street northbound No access into Church Street northbound from Parkes Street
Cumberland	South Wentworthville	23.7	14.7	Hawkesbury Road (north) – Westmead, Westmead Hospitals; Coleman Street (south) – Merrylands	
Cumberland	South Wentworthville	23.9	14.9	M4 Western Motorway (M4) – Homebush, Strathfield	Eastbound access to M4 Western Motorway only
Cumberland	Wentworthville	25.3	15.7	Cumberland Highway (A28) – Hornsby, Newcastle, Liverpool, Canberra	
Cumberland	Prospect	30.0	18.6	Prospect Highway – Wetherill Park, Blacktown, Baulkham Hills	Uncontrolled interchange, westbound exit and entrance via Ponds Road
Eastern Creek		35.2	21.9	Bridge over the creek (bridge name unknown)	
Blacktown	Eastern Creek	35.7	22.2	Westlink M7 Motorway (M7) – Seven Hills, Windsor, Sydney	Half-diamond interchange, northbound entry and southbound exit only
Blacktown	Eastern Creek	36.0	22.4	Wallgrove Road (south) – Cecil Park, to Light Horse Interchange; Rooty Hill Road (north) – Rooty Hill	
Ropes Creek		40.9	25.4	Bridge over the creek (bridge name unknown)	
South Creek / Wianamatta		44.8	27.8	South Creek Bridge	
Penrith	Kingswood	49.6	30.8	Parker Street (A9) – Windsor, Narellan, Camden	
Penrith	Penrith	52.1	32.4	Castlereagh Road – Castlereagh, Richmond, Windsor	
Penrith	Penrith	52.2	32.4	Mulgoa Road – Glenmore Park, Mulgoa	
Peach Tree Creek		52.5	32.6	Peach Tree Creek Bridge	
Nepean River		52.9– 53.2	32.9– 33.1	Victoria Bridge	
Penrith	Emu Plains	56.6	35.2	M4 Western Motorway (M4) – Springwood, Katoomba, Lithgow, Sydney	Uncontrolled dumbbell interchange; western terminus of route A44
Gap in route
Blue Mountains	Glenbrook	58.8	36.5	Governors Drive – Lapstone	Western terminus of M4 Western Motorway and route M4, eastern terminus of route A32; Southbound exit and northbound entrance only
Blue Mountains	Springwood	71.1	44.2	Macquarie Road – Springwood, Winmalee, Richmond	Westbound access to and from Macquarie Road only
Blue Mountains	Springwood	71.7	44.6	Hawkesbury Road – Springwood, Winmalee, Richmond	Controlled intersection – eastbound access to and from Silvia Road via George Street, providing connection to Hawkesbury Road.
Blue Mountains	Springwood	73.0	45.4	Ferguson Road – Springwood, Winmalee, Richmond	Controlled Cross Intersection with Ferguson Road to the south, providing access to Springwood, and Moorecourt Avenue to the north (local traffic only).
Blue Mountains	Wentworth Falls	97.6	60.6	Uncontrolled Intersection Scott Avenue – Leura	Scenic Drive
Blue Mountains	Leura	99.8	62.0	Leura Mall – Leura	Roundabout interchange
Blue Mountains	Katoomba	102.2	63.5	Controlled Intersection Parke Street via Yeaman Bridge – Katoomba, The Three Sisters	
Blue Mountains	Katoomba	103.6	64.4	Bathurst Road – Katoomba, The Three Sisters	Westbound access to Bathurst Road only; Scenic Drive
Blue Mountains	Katoomba	104	65	Bathurst Road – Katoomba, The Three Sisters	Eastbound access to Bathurst Road only; Scenic Drive
Blue Mountains	Mount Victoria	119.0	73.9	Controlled Intersection Darling Causeway – Bell	From 9 March 2026, no further access along Great Western Highway to Hartley. Detour via Darling Causeway and B59 Chifley Road to access Hartley and Lithgow.
Lithgow	Hartley	129.8	80.7	Jenolan Caves Road (Tourist Route 1) – Oberon, Jenolan Caves	
Lithgow	Bowenfels	137.3	85.3	Magpie Hollow Road – Rydal, O'Connell, Lake Lyell	
Lithgow	Bowenfels	140.4	87.2	Main Street (B59) – Lithgow, Bell, to Bells Line of Road (B59) – Richmond, Windsor	
Marrangaroo Creek		146.2	90.8	Marrangaroo Creek Bridge	
Lithgow	Marrangaroo	147.6	91.7	Castlereagh Highway (B55) – Mudgee, Gilgandra, Walgett, Mount Piper Power Station	
Coxs River		149.8	93.1	Jack Wilson Bridge	
Lithgow	Wallerawang	150.2	93.3	Barton Avenue – Wallerawang, Wallerawang Power Station	
Bathurst	Kelso	196.6	122.2	Littlebourne Street, to O'Connell Road (Tourist Route 1) – O'Connell, Oberon, Goulburn	
Bathurst	Kelso	197.6	122.8	Gilmour Street (Bathurst-Ilford Road) – Sofala, Ilford, Mudgee	
Macquarie River		198.5	123.3	Evans Bridge	
Bathurst	Bathurst	201.9	125.5	Mid-Western Highway (A41 southwest) – Blayney, Cowra, Hay; Brilliant Street (southeast) – Bathurst, Mount Panorama Circuit	
Bathurst	Bathurst	201.9	125.5	Mitchell Highway (A32 northwest) – Orange, Wellington, Dubbo	Western terminus of highway at roundabout, route A32 continues northwest along Mitchell Highway
1.000 mi = 1.609 km; 1.000 km = 0.621 mi: Incomplete access; Tolled; Route transition

== See also ==
- Highways in Australia
- Highways in New South Wales
