= Forest Grove, New South Wales =

Forest Grove New South Wales
- Coordinates: 33°22′21″S 149°39′39″E
- Population: 115 (SAL 2021)
- Postcode(s): 2795
- Elevation: 700 m (2,297 ft)
- Location: 10 km (6 mi) ENE of Bathurst; 58 km (36 mi) WNW of Lithgow; 196 km (122 mi) WNW of Sydney
- LGA(s): Bathurst Region
- State electorate(s): Bathurst
- Federal division(s): Calare
Suburbs around Forest Grove:
Peel	Yarras	Yarras
Laffing Waters	Forest Grove	Glanmire
Kelso	Raglan	Glanmire

Forest Grove is a suburb of Bathurst, New South Wales, Australia, in the Bathurst Region.
