= Bentinck Street houses, Bathurst =

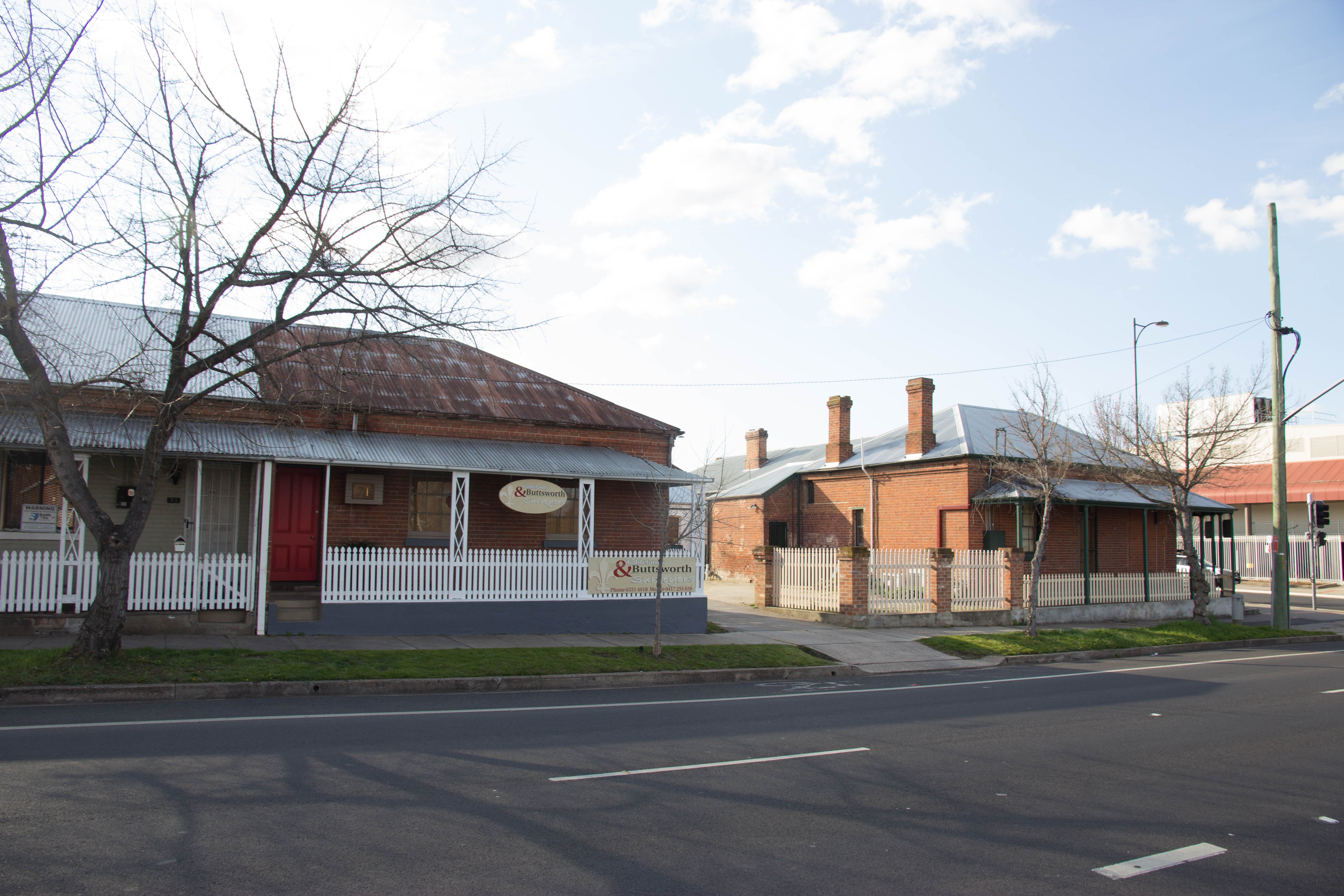
- 71 (left) and 67 (right) Bentinck Street, Bathurst

- Location within New South Wales Location within Australia
- 33°25′08″S 149°34′58″E
- Location: 67 and 71 Bentinck Street, Bathurst, Bathurst Region, New South Wales, Australia

New South Wales Heritage Register
- Official name: House
- Type: State heritage (built)
- Designated: 2 April 1999
- Reference no.: 395
- Type: Semi-Detached House
- Category: Residential buildings (private)

The Bentinck Street houses are two separately heritage-listed semi-detached houses at 67 and 71 Bentinck Street, Bathurst, in the Central West region of New South Wales, Australia. The houses are privately owned. Both houses were added to the New South Wales State Heritage Register on 2 April 1999.

== See also ==
- Australian residential architectural styles
