= Windradyne, New South Wales =

Windradyne New South Wales
- Coordinates: 33°24′22″S 149°32′55″E
- Population: 2,936 (2016 census)
- LGA(s): Bathurst Region
- State electorate(s): Bathurst
- Federal division(s): Calare

Windradyne is a suburb of Bathurst, New South Wales, Australia, in the Bathurst Region.
