= Glanmire, New South Wales =

Glanmire New South Wales
- Coordinates: 33°24′54.3″S 149°42′04.2″E
- Population: 186 (2021 census)
- Postcode(s): 2795
- Elevation: 795 m (2,608 ft)
- Location: 188 km (117 mi) WNW of Sydney; 48 km (30 mi) W of Lithgow; 13 km (8 mi) E of Bathurst
- LGA(s): Bathurst Region
- State electorate(s): Bathurst
- Federal division(s): Calare
Localities around Glanmire:
Yarras/Forest Grove	Clear Creek	Napoleon Reef
Raglan	Glanmire	Walang
Kelso	Brewongle	Wambool

Glanmire is a locality in the Bathurst Region, New South Wales, Australia.
