= Yetholme, New South Wales =

Village in New South Wales, Australia

Yetholme New South Wales
- Coordinates: 33°26′51″S 149°49′03″E
- Population: 253 (2011)
- Postcode(s): 2795
- Elevation: 1,070 m (3,510 ft)
- Location: 175 km (109 mi) W of Sydney; 25 km (16 mi) E of Bathurst; 35 km (22 mi) W of Lithgow
- LGA(s): Bathurst Regional Council
- State electorate(s): Bathurst
- Federal division(s): Calare
Localities around Yetholme:
Glanmire	Sunny Corner	Sunny Corner
Walang	Yetholme	Meadow Flat
Wambool; Locksley	Gemalla	Tarana

Yetholme (/jɛθoʊm/YETH-ome) is a village in New South Wales, Australia, originally known as Fryingpan and Frying Pan. The town is near Frying Pan Creek. It is situated 25 kilometres (16 mi) east of Bathurst and 35 kilometres (22 mi) west of Lithgow.

== Naming ==
Within the Bathurst regional local government area, the designated village is within the parish of Yetholme, and county of Roxburgh; which mirrors the Scottish village namesakes of Kirk Yetholm and Town Yetholm, within the Scottish parish of Yetholm, and the former Scottish county of Roxburghshire (now Scottish Borders). The name was in use for the Australian parish by 1834, when Charles Marsden was given a claim for land of 1,100 acres (450 ha) at Dirty Swap, Fish River.

Yetholme village's 'Fryingpan' name was to change in 1866 when the church district was divided:

We have been able to relieve the Hartley clergyman from the charge of the extreme western part of his district by attaching it to O'Connell. Formerly, the district of Hartley extended to within ten miles of Bathurst, and was about forty miles in extent from east to west. The portion taken from it includes Kirkconnell, Mitchell's Creek, and a small valley across which the main road runs, and where the usual collection of houses constituting a township rejoices in the name of Fryingpan. Any one who halted in it on a hot day, as we did, would be at no loss to discover the reasons which had suggested the name. The good taste of the Surveyor-General's department has decreed that in future it shall bear the euphonious designation of Yetholme. Here is a school, and a teacher who cares for the young people on Sunday; and as the private house in which the Sunday-school is held is small and inconvenient, and a church service cannot be held there, it was agreed that an effort should be made to build a church. Land has been secured, some promises have been made, and I have pledged tho Church Society to give £50 towards a stone or brick building, to hold 100 people, in which a Sunday-school may be hold every Sunday, and divine service by the clergyman once a month.

== Origins ==
By 1860, a township had formed with several substantial and well-built dwellings, and a 'commodious' National School. In 1863 crown lands were set aside and declared as suburban land for the Village of Yetholme, at Fryingpan Creek [sic], of 168 acres (68 ha), around Leigh, Parsons, and Fardell Streets. A post office called Yetholme was designated in mid-1866.

The town was part of the stage coach route from Sydney to Bathurst, had three hotels, stores, bakers, butcher shops, and blacksmiths, pre-train line. By 1890, the public hotels, bakers and butchers were gone.

Until 1836 the road from Sydney to Bathurst passed through Hartley, Bowenfels and O'Connell. By the end of 1836 a new road to Bathurst was constructed from Bowenfels, via Rydal and Yetholme.

Together with good perennial streams, the area was known for its commercial supply of fruits: apples, pears, plums, cherries, gooseberries, raspberries, and currants. There are also the mineral deposits – although not in commercial quantities – of gold, silver, copper, manganese, limestone, and molybdenite.

== Facilities ==
The Kirkconnell Public School is named for the large property that was in the neighbourhood owned by the blands which was later subdivided into property's and forestry and named its own town. Kirkconnell, the Kirkconnell property was used as an orchard and to this day is family owned as an organic produce farm

Saint Paul's Anglican Church, in Porters Lane, which was opened in May 1868, and has an adjacent cemetery with headstone inscriptions dating from 1873. A sign of the decline in prosperity of the area was noted by 1890 with the 'rather neat brick Anglican Church' in badly want of repair.
