= Wambool, New South Wales =

Wambool New South Wales
- Coordinates: 33°28′45″S 149°42′56″E
- Population: 38 (2021 census)
- Postcode(s): 2795
- Elevation: 784 m (2,572 ft)
- Location: 186 km (116 mi) WNW of Sydney; 49 km (30 mi) W of Lithgow; 22 km (14 mi) ESE of Bathurst
- LGA(s): Bathurst Region
- State electorate(s): Bathurst
- Federal division(s): Calare
Localities around Wambool:
Glanmire	Walang	Yetholme
Brewongle	Wambool	Locksley
O'Connell	O'Connell	Locksley

Wambool is a locality in the Bathurst Region, New South Wales, Australia.

== Heritage ==
Wambool has heritage sites, including:

- Main Western railway line: Wambool old-rail truss overbridges
