= Raglan, New South Wales =

Raglan Bathurst, New South Wales
- Coordinates: 33°26′00″S 149°39′00″E
- Population: 1,199 (2016 census)
- Postcode(s): 2795
- Elevation: 737 m (2,418 ft)
- Location: 8 km (5 mi) E of Bathurst; 54 km (34 mi) W of Lithgow; 194 km (121 mi) WNW of Sydney
- LGA(s): Bathurst Region
- State electorate(s): Bathurst
- Federal division(s): Calare
Suburbs around Raglan:
| Laffing Waters | Forest Grove | Glanmire |
| Kelso | Raglan | Glanmire |
| White Rock | White Rock | Brewongle |

Raglan is a locality in the Bathurst Region of New South Wales, Australia. It was named after FitzRoy Somerset, 1st Baron Raglan, commander-in-chief of the Allied forces in the Crimean War from 1850 to 1855. It had a population of 1,199 people as of the 2016 census.

Raglan Public School opened in December 1870, and has been on its current Nelson Street site since 1988. It had an enrollment of 273 in 2017.

St James Anglican Church has bi-monthly services on the first Sunday of the month in odd-numbered months, alternating with St John the Evangelist Church at Peel in the even-numbered months. The Raglan Community Hall remains in operation and is managed by the Raglan Community and Sporting Committee. The Raglan Rural Fire Brigade celebrated its sixtieth anniversary in 2017.

Bathurst Airport is located at Raglan. Mars Petcare opened a $100 million upgrade of their Raglan manufacturing facility in May 2015. The suburb was formerly home to the Bathurst Brick Company factory, which relocated to Raglan in 1977 until its closure in 1998, seven years after being purchased by CSR Limited.

Raglan Post Office opened on 15 August 1873, closed on 12 May 1876, reopened on 1 January 1883 and closed on 6 June 1990.

The village was subject to a controversial proposal for a two-storey, 48-room motel, petrol station, convenience store, seven shops and a 111-unit self-storage facility on a disused nursery site in 2014; however, this has not been built.

== Heritage listings ==
Raglan has a number of heritage-listed sites, including:

- Main Western railway: Raglan railway station
