= History of infrastructure development in Bathurst =

In 2013 Bathurst, New South Wales, Australia celebrated 200 years from its naming as a town in 1813. Over the 200 years significant milestones have occurred in the town and regions infrastructure development to support growth of the region.

The development of Australia progressed with a few frontier towns built in extreme isolation like Bathurst. Sydney was founded in 1788 and 25 years later in 1813 only a few other coastal towns had been established. The desire to explore the unknown areas led the Colonial Government to sponsor expeditions to the interior of the vast country. A large mountain range running parallel to the Sydney coast blocked access to the west and rugged mountains and a river blocked access to the north. Before the exploration of the inland started they had no idea what they would find but what they did discover was fertile and well watered land ideal for grazing of animals and producing agricultural products.

To grow from a village to a town to a city requires major infrastructure construction. This normally occurs in phases, as the technology develops, as the funds allow, and the needs become pressing.

The key infrastructure developments that allowed Bathurst to grow were the road system, gas supply, telegraph network, railways, telephone, electricity, and water systems. Each one of these created an improvement in living conditions and productivity for the residents and the economy as a whole.

First a road was required and once built settlers moved west, over time the other infrastructure requirements followed as the town grew in importance to the Colony.

== Summary timeline of major infrastructure improvements ==
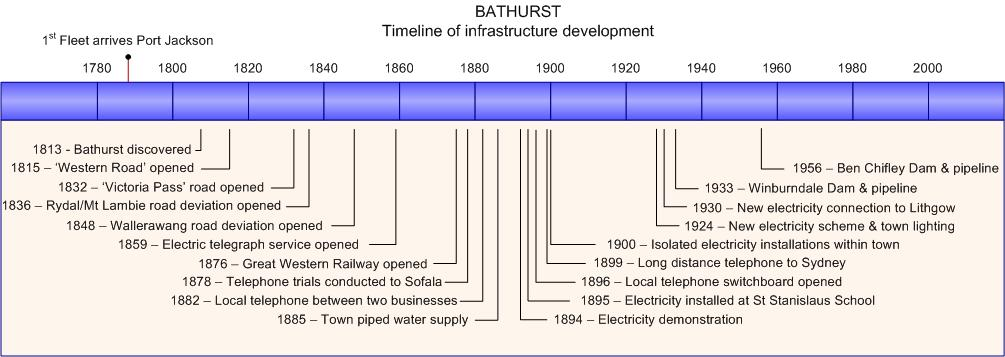

== 1814 – Roads ==
Immediately a need arose for a road to gain access to the vast lands of the interior, but it was no ordinary track that needed to be constructed, this road had to cross a formidable mountain range and abruptly descend into a valley criss-crossed by rivers and streams.

To develop, a town needs access from the adjacent populated centres. In 1813, the Bathurst district was discovered by an exploration party from Sydney that crossed the wild mountain range known as 'The Blue Mountains'. From that point the region was identified as ideal farming land and the Governor ordered a road to be built across the mountain range to the new settlement of Bathurst. This set the scene for population growth and development of the entire western region of the colony of New South Wales.

Three significant changes to the Sydney to Bathurst road route occurred throughout the nearly 200 years of history of the road.

=== Cox's Road (Eastern Road) ===
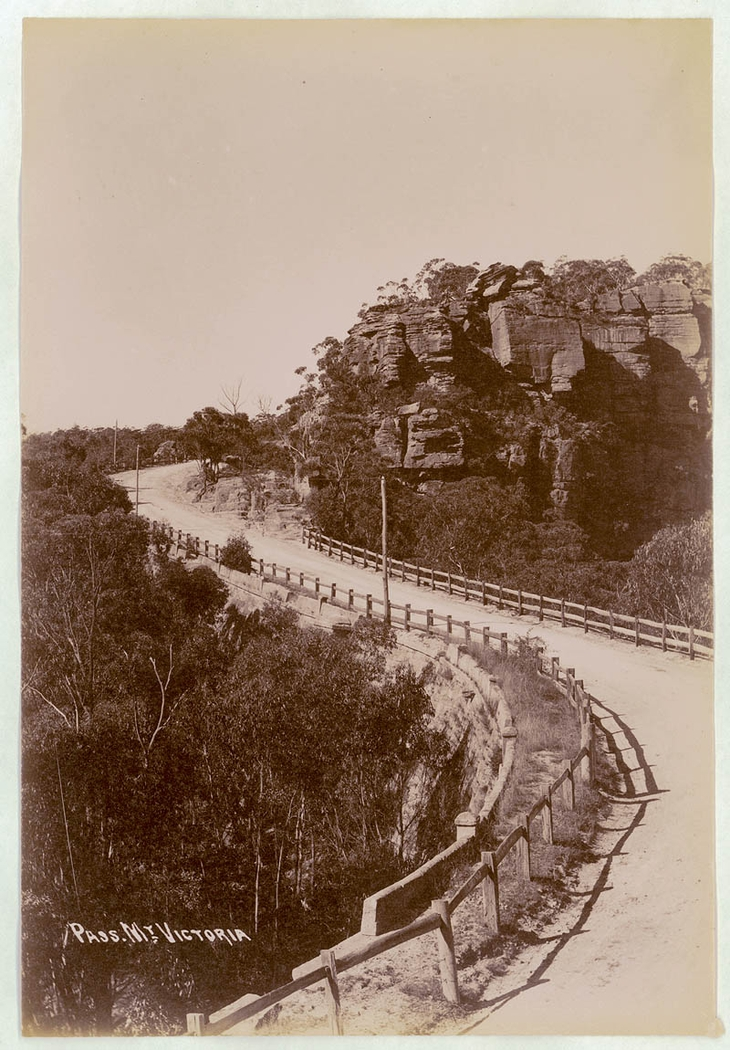
Victoria Pass – New South Wales, also shows the single wire telegraph line

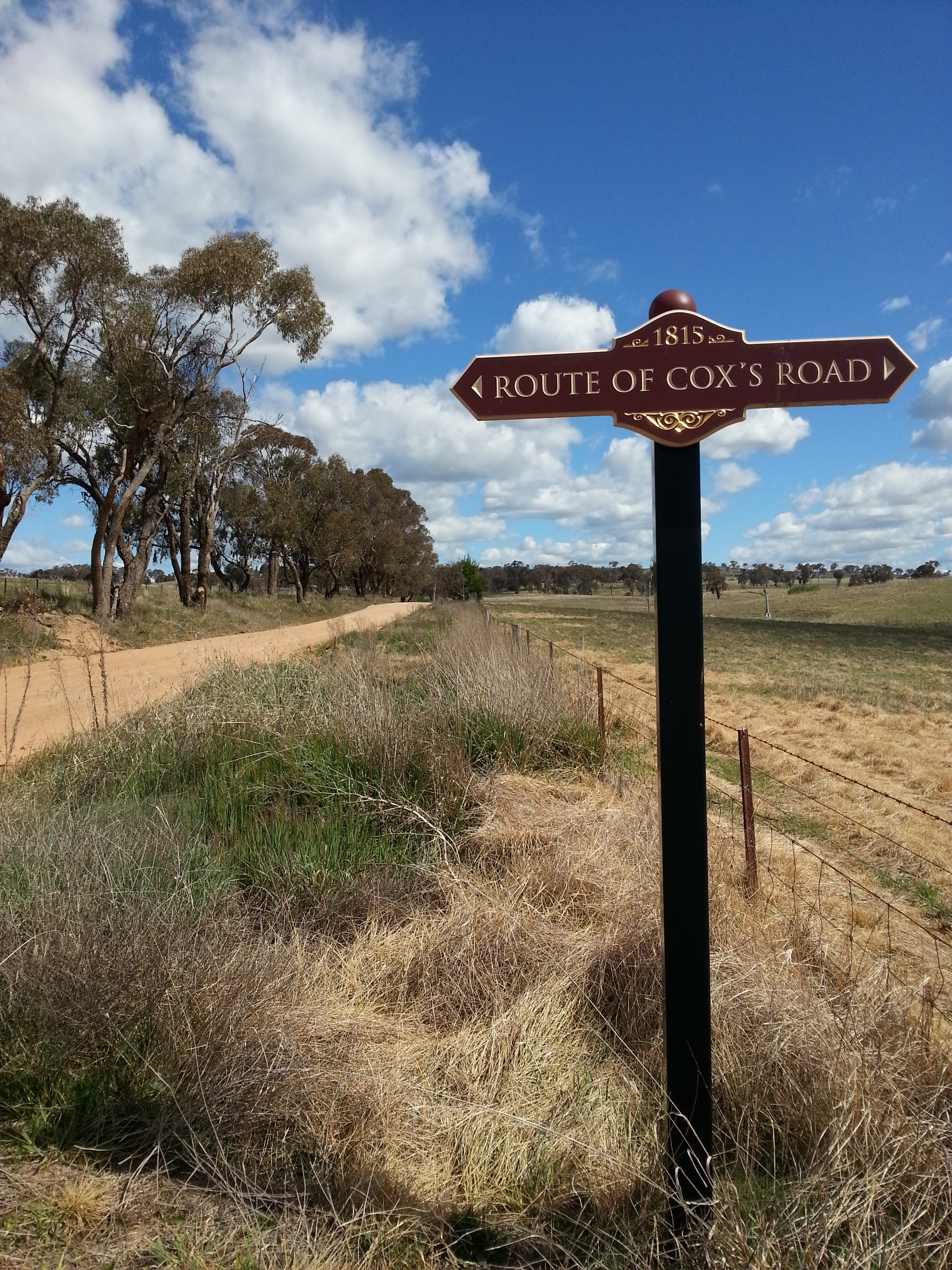
Interpretative sign on original Cox's Road, built 1815.

In 1814 the Governor Lachlan Macquarie of the colony of NSW approved the construction of a 163 kilometre long road from the existing limit of habitation of Sydney (near Penrith) to the newly discovered locality of Bathurst. The road was built by William Cox and completed on 14 January 1815. The instructions to William Cox on building the road were as follows...

First the road is to commence at the ford (already determined) on the Nepean River to Emu Plains, and from there across the Blue Mountains to the Macquarie River and the centrical part of the Bathurst Plains.
Second the road thus made must be at least twelve feet wide, so as to permit two carts or other wheel carts to pass each other with ease, the timber in the forest ground to be cut down and cleared away 20 feet wide, grubbing up the stumps and filling the holes, so that a four wheel carriage or cart may pass without difficulty of danger.
Third, in brush ground it is to be cut twenty feet wide and grubbed up to twelve feet wide. I conceive this to be sufficient width for the proposed road at the present, but where it can with ease and convenience be done, I would prefer the road to be made sixteen feet wide
Fourth, the road for the present is to terminate about the center of Bathurst Plains on the bank of Macquarie River, carrying the road as near to the banks of that river as practicable.

William was instructed to make use of depots and ask for any provisions that were required for the workers' comfort. So as not to disrupt the working party, orders were given to the public and posted in conspicuous places, against visiting or crossing the Nepean without a pass signed by the Governor.

The road commenced at Emu Ford and proceeded to Wentworth Falls, here he had built a hut to house supplies, the road proceeded generally along the existing highway route following the top of the mountain ridges, a second provision hut was built at a site later known as Weatherboard Inn, now Wentworth Falls. The road continued through present-day towns such as Leura, Katoomba, and Blackheath. At the present town of Mount Victoria the original road proceeded north west diverging from the existing westerly route. Cox's original route winds its way down an extremely difficult descent known as Mount York, Governor Macquarie later named the passage down Mount York as Cox's Pass in honour of William Cox the builder. For 15 years Mount York was a serious impediment to traffic on the western road. It was so steep that passengers often had to disembark from their carriages, walk down the descent and wait for their horse-drawn carriage at the bottom. Bullock teams hauling goods had to tie large logs to the back of their wagons to retard the speed of descent. The Government regularly sent work crews to burn the large accumulation of logs at the bottom of Mount York.

From the bottom of Mount York the original road continues its entirely different course from that of the later routes. The old road travels roughly due west passing through the village of Hartley, O'Connell, and then turning north crossing the Macquarie River then through the locality of The Lagoon and north into Bathurst. This route is so different from the subsequent routes that it is difficult to plot on a map. The old road ran parallel and approximately 30 kilometres south of the present road. In various sections the road no longer exists and other sections are now only sections of minor gravel roads. For approximately half of the entire western road the route now is entirely different from the first road to Bathurst.

The party consisted of 28 convict men and 6 soldiers and this team built the road and bridges in a six-month period.

This new road immediately became known as the Western Road.

=== O'Connell deviation ===
In 1823 Cox's original road was diverted just south of the present village of O'Connell through the future village of O'Connell and parallel to the east bank of the Fish and Macquarie Rivers, arriving at the village of Kelso on the eastern side of the Macquarie River, Bathurst town being immediately opposite on the western bank of the River. The original 1815 route passed parallel to the west bank of the Macquarie River through the Lagoon locality.

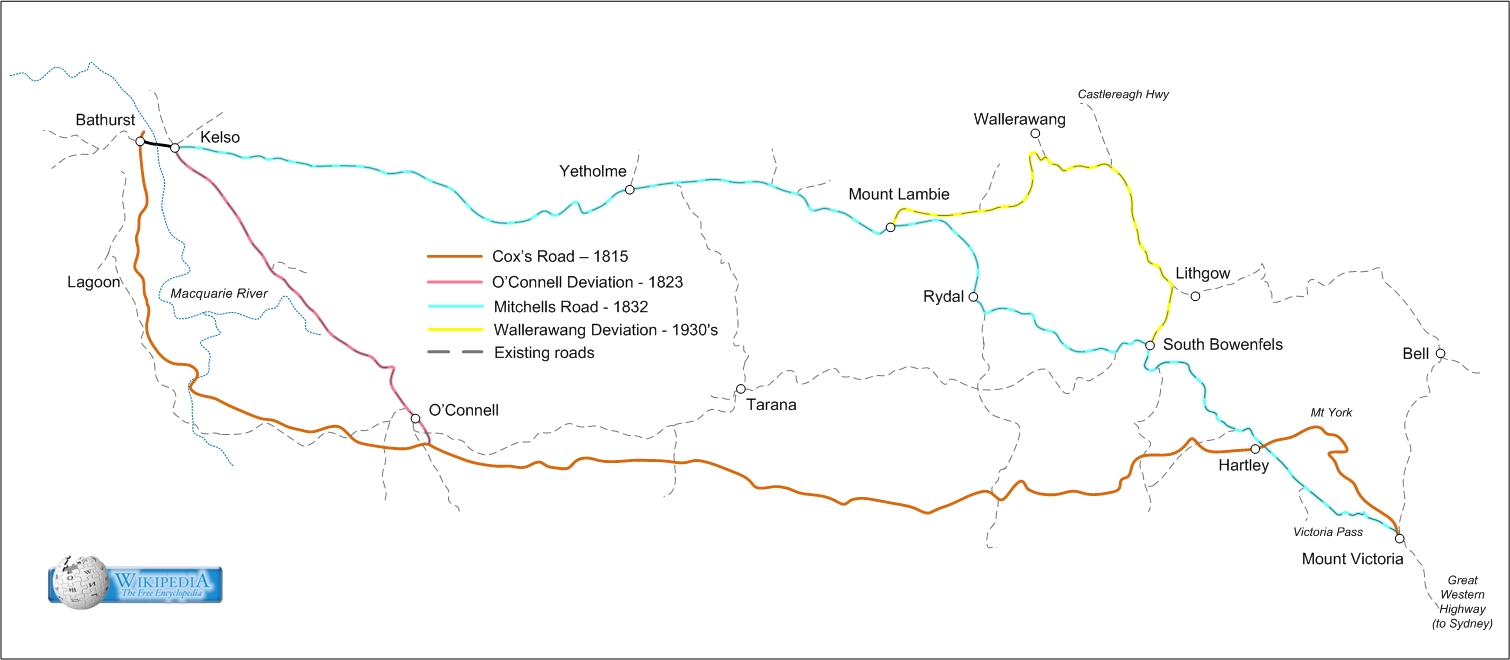
Diagram showing historical road routes between Sydney (via Mount Victoria) and Bathurst.

=== Victoria Pass and Rydal deviation ===
As westward traffic increased, Cox's remarkable but hastily built road was improved in the 1820-30s by major deviations and improvements, particularly the western half from Mount Victoria. After this improvement, in May 1831, the Government announced the new name of the road as the Great Western Road. It too was constructed by convict labour but under the supervision of the newly appointed Surveyor General, Major Sir Thomas Mitchell. Surveyor Mitchell descended the 'Mountain' via an alternative route, the demanding Victoria Pass, whose 8:1 gradient has challenged drivers for almost 180 years! Victoria Pass opened on 23 October 1832, by Governor Sir Richard Bourke. It was traversed on 18 January 1836 by the young naturalist Charles Darwin, who wrote of it in The Voyage of the Beagle: "To effect this pass, an enormous quantity of stone has been cut through; the design, and its manner of execution, would have been worthy of any line of road in England – even that of Holyhead."

Along with the Victoria Pass deviation, Mitchell surveyed a new route through the villages of Rydal (then known as solitary Creek) and Yetholme. This took the road much further north than the original alignment through an area still known as 40 bends, the work started in 1832 and was completed late 1836. The section west of Yetholme is generally the same alignment as that used to this day. Much of today's modern Highway to Bathurst follows Mitchell's line apart from the later deviation through Bowenfels (Lithgow) and Wallerawang.

The formation of the new Mountain Road towards Bathurst proceeds rapidly; the distance saved thereby, and the avoidance of several tedious acclivities, render it a very important improvement in the means of communication with the Capital.

— The Monitor (Sydney), 13 August 1827.

=== Wallerawang deviation ===
As the towns of Lithgow and Wallerawang grew in importance with coal mining and as the railways were now located there, traffic increased to these towns, the route via Rydal was also quite steep in parts. As early as 1848 a group of prominent members of the Bathurst community surveyed and proposed a new route. The new route deviated from the former at a point south of Lithgow (old Bowenfels) and proceeded past the outskirts of Lithgow and alongside the mining and railway town of Wallerawang, joining the previous Mitchell's route near Mount Lambie. It was not until 1929 that is new route was completed. This new route now bypassed the village of Rydal and avoided several long steep hills, especially the seven-mile hill at Mount Lambie.

=== Bathurst bridges ===
In September 1867 a major flood washed away the first Denison Bridge that had spanned the Macquarie River. Unfortunately, as that bridge was washed down the flooded river, it collided with the only other bridge spanning the river, Rankins' Bridge four miles down river, and destroyed that bridge also. The destroyed timber bridge at Bathurst was replaced with a new bridge made of wrought and cast iron, also named the Denison Bridge, a short distance to the south of the old bridge location.

=== Modern improvements ===
See the Wikipedia article Great Western Highway for detail on more recent Highway improvements.

=== Travel time Sydney to Bathurst ===
Following the completion of the new road in 1815 the Governor undertook the journey to the new town of Bathurst. The journey from near Penrith to Bathurst on horseback took 8 days., and bullock drays took up to 18 days on the journey. Six years later, in 1821, Governor Macquarie proceeded to Bathurst from near Penrith, the journey taking 4 days in his horse-drawn coach.

A contemporary report in 1848 states that the mail contractor proposed to commence a non-stop service from Sydney to Bathurst taking approximately 24 hours to complete the one way journey. However, in 1858 the weekly passenger coach took 5 days to complete the journey. Combined with modern motor vehicles and a much improved road design the present day journey time is approximately 3 hours.

=== Development along the routes ===
Settlement sprung up along the road to support travellers and farmers taking advantage of the access to both Sydney and Bathurst. At the outset small camps were established during the construction of the road. They were known as Convict Stockades and they were located at Glenroy (1815–), Mount Walker (1832 – c. 1839), Mount Victoria (c. 1830 – 1836), Hassan's Walls (1835 – c. 1839), Stoney Range (1832 – c. 1839), Honeysuckle Hill (1832 – c. 1839), Diamond Swamp (1833 – c. 1839), Bull's Camp Woodford (1833–1848), Bowen's Hollow (1835 – c. 1838), Mount Clarence, and Blackheath (1844–1849). Small villages then developed along the route particularly associated with an Inn, where travellers could have overnight accommodation, a meal, and feed their horses. Along the original route the small villages including Weatherboard (now Wentworth Falls), Hartley Vale, O'Connell, served the travellers and supported small local communities. The first inn in the area was Collit's Inn at Hartley Vale which was constructed in 1823. Subsequent development was to occur at Bowenfels, with the construction of a number of inns along the main road from 1832.

== 1859 – the electric telegraph ==
The electric telegraph was developed into a practical system for transmitting morse code messages during the early 1800s. It was in 1837 that the first commercial electric telegraph was used in England, and 17 years later in 1854 Australia had its first commercial telegraph in operation. It was only 5 years later, in 1859, that the electric telegraph reached Bathurst from Sydney. This link was a major leap in improving efficiency of trade and developing the state's economy. It specifically changed the way business was done in Bathurst, money transfers, police messages, government instructions, share trading, time signals, news, all sorts of business and to a lesser degree, private messages.

Before the telegraph link communications between the capital city Sydney and Bathurst would involve a using the postal service which at best would involve a 24-hour transit over the mountains by horse-drawn carriage. After the arrival of the telegraph the message could pass between the towns in minutes.

=== Arrival of electric telegraph ===
On 29 December 1859 the newly constructed telegraph line was brought into use, the line was built generally alongside the Great Western Road from Sydney to Bathurst and was constructed of timber poles with one galvanised wire tied to insulators on each pole. At several intermediate points along the route a telegraph repeater station was located, including Parramatta, Penrith, Katoomba and Hartley. At the intermediate repeater stations an operator manually retyped the message, passing it through that location. The system operated on the earth return principle whereby the circuit started at a large battery at one end (end A), via a morse key used by the telegraph operator, passed along the galvanised iron wire attached to the poles, then through the morse instrument at the far end (end B) and returned to the battery (at end A) through the ground (earth). This was a cheap method of construction requiring only one wire and no pole crossarms.

=== Expansion of telegraph from Bathurst ===
Once the telegraph reached Bathurst from Sydney in 1859 the need to expand the lines from Bathurst to other western towns was obvious to civic leaders. The telegraph network rapidly expanded from Bathurst to the following towns.

- 1860 – on 25 December the telegraph line between Bathurst and Orange was opened to business
- 1861 – 17 June Sofala was connected to Bathurst and Mudgee extension was opened in May 1861
- 1876 – on 18 August the telegraph line from Bathurst to Blayney opened
- 1879 – on 19 March the telegraph line extension from Blayney to Carcoar was opened
- 1879 – 20 September, a new telegraph line was opened from Bathurst to Rockley
- 1915 – 31 November, the Bathurst Telegraph office became the main repeating center for western towns, all messages were transmitted to and from outlying towns and relayed to Sydney from Bathurst

=== The teletype ===
In February 1929 the telegraph system was upgraded with the installation of teleprinter equipment between Sydney and Bathurst. This automated the transfer of messages. A message was typed on a machine similar to a typewriter and at the other end a machine printed the message.

== 1872 – town gas arrives ==
Up to the 1870s the only forms of lighting for homes and businesses at nights was the candle and oil lamps. A report of the time mentions a popular candle was the 'penny tallow candle'.

=== Private gasworks ===
During 1871/72 a private Gasworks was built adjacent to the Macquarie River south of the old Denison Bridge on Durham Street, built by John Newlands Wark and known as the Bathurst Gas Company. On 4 May 1872 Bathurst was lit by gas when the new coal fired plant was brought into use.

=== Council gasworks ===
Due to complaints regarding quality of gas and cost of supply from the private 'Bathurst Gas Company', in 1888 the Bathurst Council built a competing gasworks and piped town gas to businesses, street lights, and homes. To illustrate the advantage of gas over candles it was stated by The Bathurst Council that a gas lamp had the equivalent light output of 16 candles. For many years Wark Brothers and the Bathurst Council competed to supply businesses and residences of Bathurst with town produced gas.

=== One gas network for Bathurst ===
In April 1914 after 26 years of competition between the public and privately owned gas networks and strong debate about the viability of two networks the Bathurst Council voted to purchase the Bathurst Gas Company for £12,000, finally creating one gas network for the city.

=== Natural gas connection ===
In 1987 the gasworks producing town gas was decommissioned and Bathurst's gas system was converted to natural gas from the State gas grid.

== 1876 – The coming of the railways ==
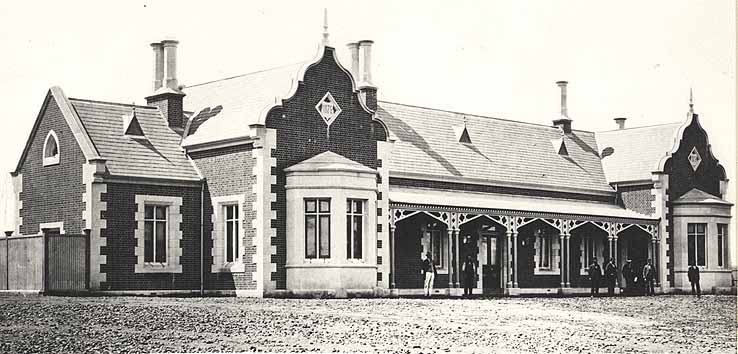
Railway Station – Bathurst.

=== The railway approaches Bathurst ===
After the road the next big boost to development of Bathurst and the western region of NSW was the Railway. The railway reached Rydal, 39 kilometres east of Bathurst on 1 July 1870. On 22 April 1872 the railway was opened to Locke's Platform (now Locksley), and a few months later on 1 July 1872 the railway reached Macquarie Plains, now known as Brewongle. The train journey from Sydney to Macquarie Plains took 9 hours.

Then another three years later the railway reached Kelso (on the eastern bank of the Macquarie River near Bathurst) in 1875.

=== Bathurst Railway Station opens ===
As soon as the railway bridge over the Macquarie River was completed the railway entered the town proper on 4 April 1876. Travel times for goods and passengers were 24 hours travelling by horse and buggy on the Western Road, the time dropped to 6 hours by train, a 75% reduction. This created a great boost to growth particularly with the boom in population and trade due to the Gold Rush.

A large station building was constructed based on a unique Victorian Tudor style, the building is of a unique style and design on the NSW Rail system.

A quote from a newspaper article in 1875:

The Great Southern and the Great Western Railways – We take the opportunity of the publication of a new timetable in the Gazette, consequent on the opening of the extension of the Great Western Railway from Kelso to Bathurst, to give some information on these points. The distance from Sydney to Wallerawang by rail is 105 miles, and to Bathurst 145 miles. A passenger train leaves (will leave after April 4) Sydney at nine o'clock in the morning, reaches Wallerawang at twenty-five minutes to four in the afternoon, and Bathurst at thirty-three minutes to six. A mail and passenger train leaves Sydney at a quarter-past five in the evening, reaches Wallerawang at half-past eleven o'clock at night, and Bathurst at thirty-three minutes to two in the morning. The return journey to Sydney is thus provided for:-a mail and passenger train leaves Bathurst at eleven minutes to twelve at night, and reaches Sydney at twenty minutes past seven in the morning. A passenger train leaves Bathurst at fourteen minutes past ten in the forenoon, and reaches Sydney at six o'clock in the evening....The fare between Sydney and Bathurst: first class, 42s. 7d, second class 32s 5d.

=== Railway infrastructure expansion ===
In line with Bathurst's status as the main regional station the railway environs were lit by gas lamps in 1878, the gas lighting of the railway facilities continued until 1934. In 1890 a major expansion of the railway facilities were approved, these included a second passenger platform with underground pedestrian subway, two mainlines, extra shunting tracks, and a new Signal Box.

By 1896, Bathurst had become a major rail facility with a locomotive depot housing 100 locomotives and a staff of 400. Many of the railway staff lived in an area known as Milltown which was close to the depot on the northern side of the railway line. By 1916 the locomotive depot had become a major steam engine overhaul workshop and catered for all locomotives assigned to the west of the mountains.

In 1910 the Railway was operating a Gas Works for railway purposes in the Bathurst railway yards.

To cater for ever increasing rail traffic volumes a second mainline track was constructed to provide two tracks from Sydney to Bathurst. The final duplication works joined at Wallerawang, the current end of double track, and was extended first to Sodwalls completed in 1915, then Locksley, next to Raglan and finally, Raglan to Kelso in 1922.

In 1929 the locomotive depot alone had 509 employees. There were also 300 employed on the Permanent Way Branch, and a further 89 in the Traffic Branch. In the 1920s there were approximately 850 Bathurst Railway staff.

After many years of lobbying the Railway Commissioners to improve the lighting of the railway yard and station environs, electric lighting was finally switched on in 1934, replacing the old gas lighting in use from the early days.

On 4 September 1946 the old level crossing gates at the rail crossing on Russell Street were replaced by a new road underpass. This reduced delays to pedestrians and road users when trains were crossing the road. The project included a new electro-mechanical signal box located on the extended east end of number 1 platform. The old fully mechanical signal box on the east end of number 2 platform was decommissioned and removed.

== 1885 – Water supply ==
=== Early water supply ===
Bathurst in the years 1813 to the middle of the 18th century relied on water taken by hand from the nearby Macquarie River and from water wells sunk in the yards of businesses and residences. As the population continued to grow particularly during the Gold Rush the need for a piped water system to deliver clean water to houses and businesses became increasingly important.

In 1885 work commenced on a pumping station and water collecting tunnels to obtain water from the Macquarrie River and to pump the water at pressure through a mains pipe system into the town.

17 June 1885 – BATHURST WATER SUPPLY. On Wednesday last Mr. Ma'gill, contractor for reticulating the town for water supply, essayed a new departure by experimenting in deep trenching by steam power, and the success of the trial made justifies the assumption that another nail has been driven into the coffins of Meesrs. Pick, Shovel ond Co.

In 1916 the pumping plant at the Water Works was upgraded, the 30-year-old equipment was replaced with new gas powered suction pumps. This doubled the capacity of the water supply.

=== Sewerage system ===
There were many complaints of the stench of waste water flowing from residential and commercial premises into the street gutters. Toilet waste from outside toilet pans were separately collected by Council waste collectors. In 1908 proposals were put forward for the commencement of a sewerage system to pipe effluent to a treatment plant on the low land near the River. After delays in obtaining Government approval for funding, new surveys required of the pipe system, labour disputes, and delays in finding a tenderer to build the treatment works, eventually the system was finished and commissioned in September 1916. By early November, 18 premises were connected and 11 connections were being installed, there were 90 applications having been received.

The initial system was of a gravity design and could only serve a portion of the town. It was not until 1934 that an extension of the system using gas powered pumping equipment and rising mains was built to serve the low levels of the town along Havannah and Charlotte Streets.

=== Winburndale Dam ===
In 1930 a scheme, known as the Charlton Water Supply Scheme, was approved by the Bathurst City Council to commence construction of a dam and supply pipeline. During the design phase the project became known as the Winburndale Dam. A wood stave pipeline connects the dam to the town of Bathurst approximately 15 kilometres to the west of the dam. The dam and pipeline were completed in 1933.

=== Chifley Dam ===
After much discussion and investigation a decision was made to construct a new dam on the Campbell River approximately 15 kilometres to the south of Bathurst. The new dam became known as 'Chifley Dam' (after the wartime Prime Minister, Ben Chifley). As of 8 August 2017 there is no pipeline.

== 1894 – Electricity ==
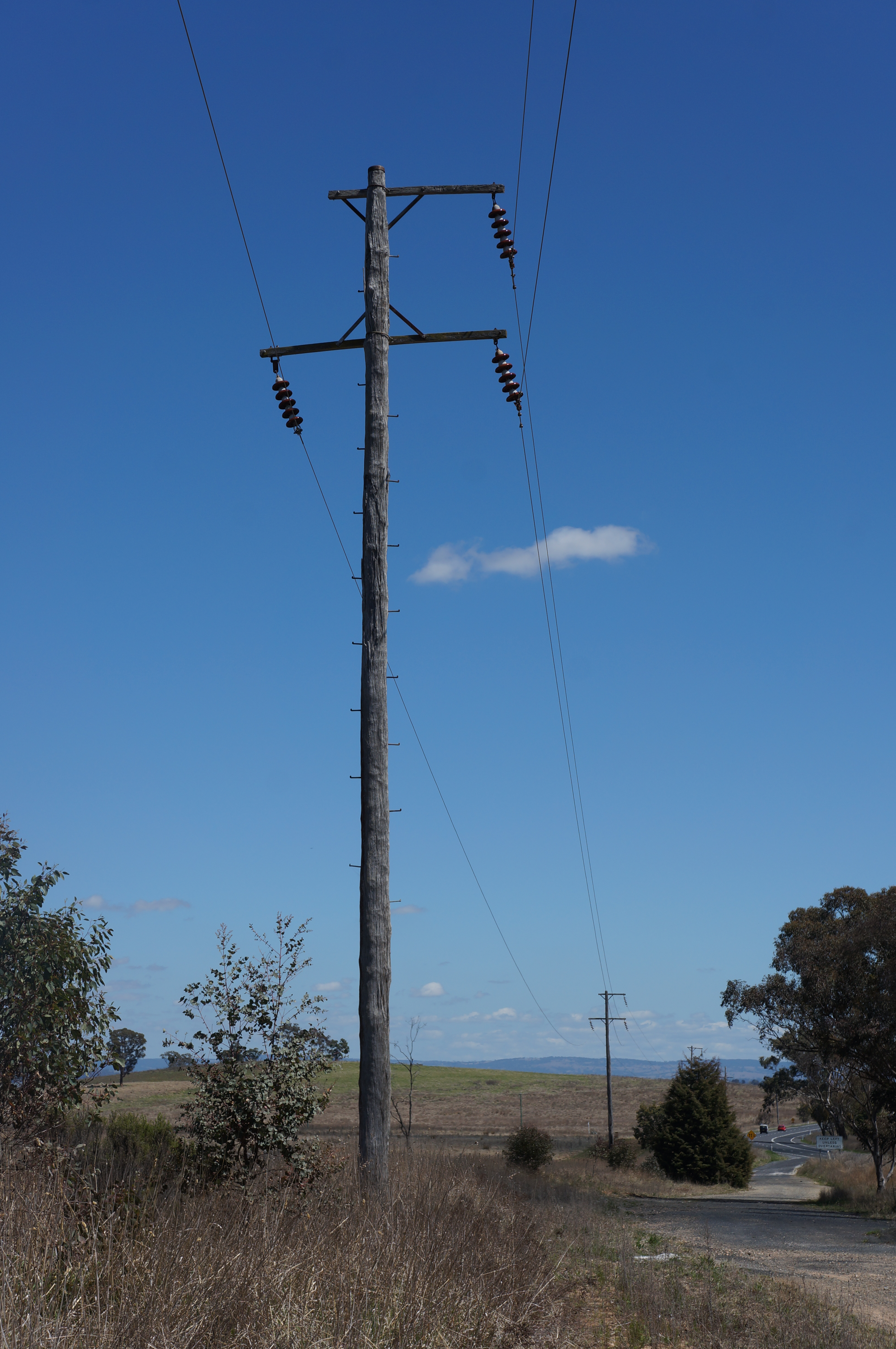
Original pole installed in 1930 by NSW Railways to supply Bathurst and still in use.

Until the advent of electricity and its introduction into towns across the world the primary form of lighting was by candle, oil and gas lamps. This was generally poor quality light and often not safe due to the presence of a flame. In the early years of electrical generation and distribution the main use for electricity in homes, businesses, and public areas was for electric lighting. It was only later that household appliances such as refrigerators, were introduced.

=== Isolated generators ===
Bathurst featured very early in the development of electricity generation and usage of electricity. The nearby town of Young had installed a new electric power system for street lighting in 1889 but by 1891 had decided to remove the equipment and revert to Gas due to the high cost of running the plant.

In 1893 the Showground had been illuminated with electric lights and during 1894 an Exhibition was held at Bathurst where the electric light was demonstrated.

The following article details the installation of a generating plant and electric lighting system within the St Stanislaus College at Bathurst.

By 1895 the college possessed a gas engine, a six-inch (15 cm) sparking coil and two Crookes tubes. Later that year an oil engine, dynamo and storage batteries supplied electric light to the science halls – no other electric light was in use at Bathurst. He built an acetylene gas generator to provide stage lighting for college theatricals and took an early interest in colour photography.

— ., Australian Dictionary of Biography

Several isolated electric lighting systems were installed around Bathurst but in the early years there was no interconnection and no street lighting. One of these was a small generating unit installed and brought into use on 14 November 1896 at a Tailors Shop on William Street. Around 1900 an electrical system was installed at the Bathurst Gaol, and in 1901 advertisements show that musical performances in the town square were illuminated by electric light.

=== Plans for a town supply ===
In 1921 the New South Wales Government Railways announced that they would construct a new power station at Lithgow to supply the railway facilities in that town. The new power station would have sufficient capacity to supply power for nearby towns.

Railway electricity for country towns – The Railway Commissioners have informed the Lithgow Council that by November, 1923, they expect to be in a position to supply Lithgow with all the electricity that is required, both for power and lighting purposes, at a very reasonable figure. The supply will come from the big electric generating station foreshadowed some months ago which it is proposed to install at the State coal mine and which will be of such dimensions that the current will be available for towns farther west, including Bathurst and Orange. The installation will be a very powerful one. The scheme is contingent on financial provision being made on the Estimates for 1921–22.

— Sydney Morning Herald, 26 April 1921

Bathurst Council were exploring options to secure a power source for the town. Early in 1922 they communicated with the Kandos Cement Works to investigate the possibility of obtaining a power supply via a transmission line from that town, 50 miles away. The company while not dismissing the proposal left it to the council to further explore the idea.

=== The local generator ===
The Railway power scheme mentioned earlier was intended to generate at one central location (Lithgow) and distribute at high voltage to towns including Bathurst, 60 kilometres to the west and much further took some to materialise. The Railway Commissioners promoted the plan since 1915 and Bathurst held off developing its own power generation scheme in the hope that the Railway scheme would proceed. By 1923 they could wait no longer, in 1923/24 Bathurst constructed a local power house and an electricity distribution network using poles and overhead wiring. The generator was powered by a gas turbine located in the Water & Power Plant alongside the Macquarie River.

The following newspaper quote details the proposed switch on of the new power scheme.

Bathurst – September 1924 – The work of preparing for electricity scheme is proceeding satisfactorily, and most of the poles have already been erected, while several houses and business premises have been wired and prepared for the installation of electric light. It is generally anticipated that it will be possible to switch on the current in about a months' time.

— ., Sydney Morning Herald, 5 September 1924

On 22 December 1924 the Bathurst town electricity supply scheme was switched on. This scheme included 370 electric street lights to replace street gas lamps at a cost of 40,000 pounds. Included in this conversion to electricity were 105 street lamps dating from 1872 and they are still a feature of Bathurst main streets and are Heritage listed. Over the next few years other important civic buildings were fitted with electric lighting. In 1926 tenders are called for electric lighting in the Bathurst Post Office and in 1937 electric lighting and power was installed in the Bathurst Technical College.

=== Supply from Lithgow ===
In mid-1930 a major step forward occurred when the Railway power supply scheme, long promised, was brought into use, bringing lower costs and higher reliability. A new 66,000 volt transmission line was completed connecting the new railway owned and operated power station at Lithgow with the town of Bathurst, a distance of approximately 60 kilometres.

Bathurst Lighting Service – When the change-over from the present electric light system to the bulk supply from the Railway Department's plant at Lithgow takes place within a few weeks, the eight men employed at the Bathurst power-house will be dismissed. The council will endeavor to place the men in other departments.

— ., Sydney Morning Herald, 27 June 1930

In the twenty years since the Bathurst electric lighting network was built it had been upgraded three times to cater for demand. In 1945 the system was upgraded to cater for the growth in demand for power, the upgrade involved the increase in distribution voltage from 2,200 volts to 11,000 volt network. Initially the electricity to homes largely supplied lights but increasingly appliances such as washing machines, refrigerators, and electric heaters were being added.

=== NSW Grid connection ===
As early as 1935 there were plans in place to interconnect the independent power systems that existed in the Sydney area, the south, west and north of the state.

As a result of the defense needs during World War II in 1942 a new 66,000 volt interconnection between the southern power system at Cowra and the western system at Orange was built. This created a grid that gave much greater reliability of power supply to towns on the grid including Bathurst.

In 1950 the NSW Government decided to merge all electricity generating companies and departments into one government owned business and the process of amalgamation was completed in 1956. In January 1953 the railway power station at Lithgow, that supplied power to Bathurst was taken over by the Electricity Commission of New South Wales and interconnection of power systems to increase reliability occurred.

== 1882 telephone experiments ==
Morse Code telegraph had been operating since 1859 but over the next 19 years a workable voice telephone had been introduced overseas and in main cities of Australia and was slowly supplementing and replacing the telegraph. In 1878 trials of voice communication using a telephone were conducted by the Bathurst Telegraph station master. The existing telegraph wires were used for the trials between the towns and temporary telephone instruments connected at each end. The following quote from a contemporary newspaper details the events...

Through the courtesy of the telegraph station-master (Mr. Chapple) the writer witnessed the wonderful feat of conversing by means of the telephone with people at Sofala, a distance by wire of 30 miles; and so successful was the result that not only were the vocal and instrumental music rendered by request clearly distinguished at either end, but questions were promptly answered as for instance, "What is your telegraph time?", Answer:"Twenty-five minutes and one-fifth past 9" Mr Chapple has since succeeded in getting a "Coo-ee" from Mount Victoria, and intends shortly to try with Sydney

=== First telephone service in Bathurst ===
The earliest telephone services were installed as point to point systems. That is from a telephone in one premise of a company to a second telephone in a separate property. The idea of linking multiple telephones via switchboards to become a network was to come later. One such isolated private system was the first use of telephones in Bathurst. The following article in the local newspaper reports of the first telephone.

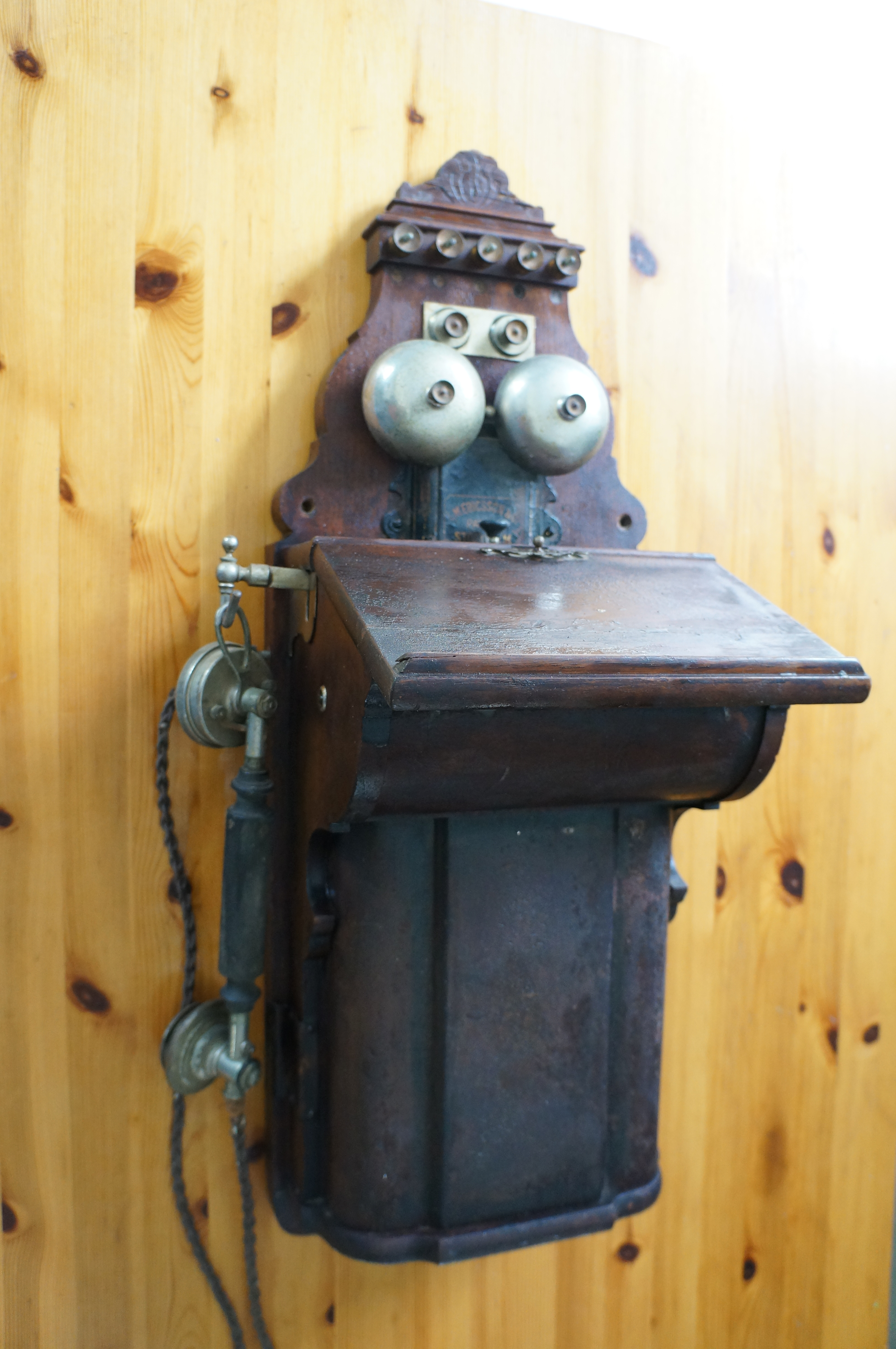
Early magneto type telephone

During the next 14 years, when the central telephone switchboard was installed, several local point to point telephone connections were built.

- 1882 the first telephone connection between two premises of a Timber merchant

18 March 1882 – ADVANCEMENT. – Messrs. Mugridge Brothers, timber-merchants, of this city, are apparently determined to keep pace with the times. They have made arrangements for working a telephone between their two yards here about half-a-mile distant from each other having had the necessary posts erected along the line of streets between them. The connection will be made very shortly. We believe that the Messrs. Mugridge purchase the instruments for use and pay the Government a few pounds per annum for the use of the wire line, which is erected by the Government. This enterprising firm can claim the honor of being the first to introduce the new method of communication over the mountains.

- 1887 the pumping station, gas works, fire station and reservoir were connected by a common telephone line.
- 1888 the Goal was connected to the Police Barracks, two miles distant
- 1890 the residents of O'Connell to the south of Bathurst succeeded in constructing a telephone service to Bathurst.
- 1891 On 17 January a party line was opened between the hospital and several doctors premises.
- 1895 a line was built between the Railway Station and the Post Office to enable the Post Office to be advised of late running mail trains.

Obviously these isolated connections were beneficial to the owners but a much greater advantage could be realized by connecting all the isolated lines and telephones to a central switchboard so that one business could talk to any one of the other businesses.

=== Local telephone exchange ===
Telephone lines were now being built all across the town of Bathurst to link one branch of a business with another or a government office with another related office. The problem was that none of the telephones could interconnect with another business. In the early 1890s the local business chamber of commerce commenced lobbying the Post & Telegraph Department to establish a telephone switchboard in Bathurst. The Government required a minimum of 15 subscribers to sign up before the switchboard would be installed. The cost to have a switchboard connection was £5 per annum. In 1896 the Government agreed and installed a telephone switchboard.

1 August 1896 – The local exchange was opened by the Telegraphmaster, Mr. W. A. Blackstone, on, 1 August 1896, with 25 subscribers.

Finally instead of being able to call only one telephone on the other end of your private line, the businesses and government offices could connect via the switchboard to any of the 25 telephones linked at the start of the switchboard service.

By June 1899 three switchboards had been installed to cater for the growth but they were replaced by two new 100 line switchboards for a total of 200 lines.

10 June 1902 – today there are 144 (telephone switchboard connections), and fresh subscribers are being added almost every week.

In 1909 the Bathurst telephone system was upgraded with a new 'metallic line' switchboard and many new metallic lines to subscribers, there now being 210 subscribers. The metallic lines offer much improved quality of line eliminating the buzz and noise associated with the old earth return lines. This same upgrade included new cables installed through the town to eliminate up to 208 overhead aerial wires on certain poles.

By 1924 the telephone switchboard had been expanded many times and had become a collection of add-on components, not able to provide a satisfactory service. In 1924 a major upgrade occurred where a new switchboard was installed. Said to be the best equipment outside of Sydney.

In 1952 a new 2000 line automatic telephone exchange was installed in a new building at the rear of the existing Post Office on Howick Street.

In 1960 the number of telephones connected in Bathurst was 2143.

=== Long-distance telephone to Sydney ===
In contrast to the unlimited telephones connections available today there was only one trunk line to connect private, commercial and government telephone users in Bathurst and all towns west to Sydney when the new line was opened in 1899. This telephone service was possible following the installation of a new pole and aerial two wire line over the mountains via Tarana and Raglan to Bathurst allowing a metallic telephone line to be introduced. In 1912 a second trunk line was added, then in 1923 a third trunk line was provided. The original single wire telegraph earth return line was retained as a separate pole and wire installation.

5 June 1899 – Telephone Exchange. – The arrangements for the long distance, telephone are now complete, and it will be open for use on Monday next. The charges fixed by the Department are 3s 6d for the first three minutes, and 1s 9d for every succeeding three minutes. It remains to be seen how the public will 'rush' the bureau in order to hold their 3s 6d conversations with people in Sydney.

The Long-distance Telephone. – The telephone connected Bathurst with Sydney was opened to the public this morning and the first private message was sent down by Hon. F. B. Suttor, from his residence, Bradwardine. Mr. Suttor conversed for some time with the Varney Parkes, Post master-General, and at each end surprise was expressed at the clearness of the voices. Everything said could be heard very distinctly. The connection will, doubtless, be appreciated by those citizens who may have important business to transact with residents of Sydney, although they will have to pay for tho privilege, and long talks will be out of the question under the charges made.

It was reported in 1905 that the telephone service between Sydney and Bathurst was the longest operating in Australia. This line generally followed the railway and passed through towns such as Wallerawang, Rydal, Tarana and Brewongle.

=== Communications hub of the west ===
Bathurst's central location and the first to receive the telegraph and telephone service from Sydney meant that it had become the hub for services to other developing towns in the west of the state. Like today where communities continually lobby governments for better mobile phone coverage, the same occurred 150 years ago. Newspaper editorials and letters to the Editor lobbied for telegraph and telephone service.

- 1905 Hill End and Hargraves connected by telephone to Bathurst
- 1905 Orange the existing two telegraph lines to Bathurst were converted to also operate as 'condenser type telephone' circuits in May 1905
- 1910 Orange to be connected by trunk extension from Bathurst in October 1910.
- 1911 Oberon is connected by metallic circuit telephone line to the Bathurst to Sydney line at Tarana
- 1913 Rockley was connected by a new trunk metallic circuit to Bathurst via Georges Plains on 14 October 1913.
- 1914 Mudgee was connected by trunk telephone via Hill End to Bathurst on 7 September 1914.
- 1914 Orange has second metallic telephone line added to Bathurst, mid 1914
- 1923 Evans Plains, Duramana, Glanmire and White Rock, were connected by telephone to Bathurst

In 1924 the existing trunk lines connecting Sydney to Bathurst and from Bathurst to other western centres had become congested and of poor quality. The Post Master Generals office carried out major upgrades. Sydney to Bathurst direct – previously two trunk lines, upgraded to three (one to be made automatic); Sydney to Orange direct – previously none to two trunk lines; Sydney to Dubbo direct – previously none to two trunk lines; Bathurst to Oberon – previously none to one; Bathurst to Cowra – new trunk line; Bathurst to Blayney – three new trunk lines; Bathurst to Orange – additional trunk line; Bathurst to Dubbo – additional trunk line; Bathurst to Lithgow – new trunk line; Bathurst to Wambool – new trunk line.

In 1929 a new carrier wave system was installed between Sydney and Bathurst to provide an additional six trunk lines

=== New communication technology ===
The overhead telephone lines that had served as telephone circuits to Sydney had become congested and were subject to outages caused by bush fires and storms. In 1951 a new underground cable was completed from Sydney to Bathurst, providing 408 trunk lines. This new cable allowed the removal of the old overhead pole lines across the Blue Mountains. This new cable formed a part of a new inland route from Sydney to Bathurst, Deniliquin, Bendigo to Melbourne brought into service in 1953.

In 1950 Bathurst had 1200 subscribers connected to the Bathurst Telephone Switchboard.

Early in 1955 a new 'automatic' telephone exchange was installed in the newly completed exchange building on Howick Street. This equipment allowed subscribers to dial another Bathurst subscriber without the assistance of the switchboard operator. Each subscriber had a new four digit telephone number.
