= Gormans Hill, New South Wales =

Gormans Hill New South Wales
- Coordinates: 33°25′57″S 149°35′25″E
- Population: 785 (2016 census)
- LGA(s): Bathurst Region
- State electorate(s): Bathurst
- Federal division(s): Calare

Gormans Hill is a suburb of Bathurst, New South Wales, Australia, in the Bathurst Region.
