= Brewongle, New South Wales =

Brewongle
- Town
- Coordinates: 33°28′45″S 149°42′56″E
- Country: Australia
- State: New South Wales
- LGA: Bathurst Region
- Location: 192 km (119 mi) WNW of Sydney; 54 km (34 mi) W of Lithgow; 16 km (9.9 mi) ESE of Bathurst

Government
  - State electorate: Bathurst
  - Federal division: Calare
- Elevation: 754 m (2,474 ft)

Population
  - Total: 124 (2016 census)
- Postcode: 2795
Localities around Brewongle
Raglan	Glanmire	Walang
White Rock	Brewongle	Wambool
The Lagoon	O'Connell	Wambool

Brewongle is a locality in the Bathurst Region of New South Wales, Australia. It had a population of 124 people as of the 2016 census.

== Railway Station ==
Opened on 1 July 1872 as Macquarie Plains, the station was named Brewongle from 1 September 1879. Located 226.100 km from Sydney, it featured two platforms, with a significant brick station building . It was closed on 6 April 1975, and demolished in the second half of 1988.

The stationmaster's cottage remains.

The name Brewongle comes from An Aboriginal word meaning "Camping place". It is the Koori name of an Aboriginal camping ground in the vicinity.
