= Walang, New South Wales =

Walang New South Wales
- Coordinates: 33°26′24″S 149°45′34″E
- Population: 109 (2021 census)
- Postcode(s): 2795
- Elevation: 965 m (3,166 ft)
- Location: 180 km (112 mi) WNW of Sydney; 40 km (25 mi) W of Lithgow; 20 km (12 mi) E of Bathurst
- LGA(s): Bathurst Region
- State electorate(s): Bathurst
- Federal division(s): Calare
Localities around Walang:
Yarras	Yetholme	Yetholme
Glanmire	Walang	Gemalla
Brewongle	Wambool	Locksley

Walang is a locality in the Bathurst Region, New South Wales, Australia.
