= Peel, New South Wales =

Peel New South Wales
- Coordinates: 33°19′00″S 149°38′00″E
- Population: 256 (SAL 2021)
- Postcode(s): 2795
- Elevation: 661 m (2,169 ft)
- Location: 15 km (9 mi) N of Bathurst; 71 km (44 mi) WNW of Lithgow; 208 km (129 mi) WNW of Sydney
- LGA(s): Bathurst Region
- State electorate(s): Bathurst
- Federal division(s): Calare
Localities around Peel:
Millah Murrah	Wiagdon	Limekilns
Duramana	Peel	Clear Creek
Eglington	Laffing Waters	Yarras

Peel is a locality in the Bathurst Region of New South Wales, Australia. It had a population of 290 people as of the 2016 census.
