= O'Connell, New South Wales =

O'Connell New South Wales
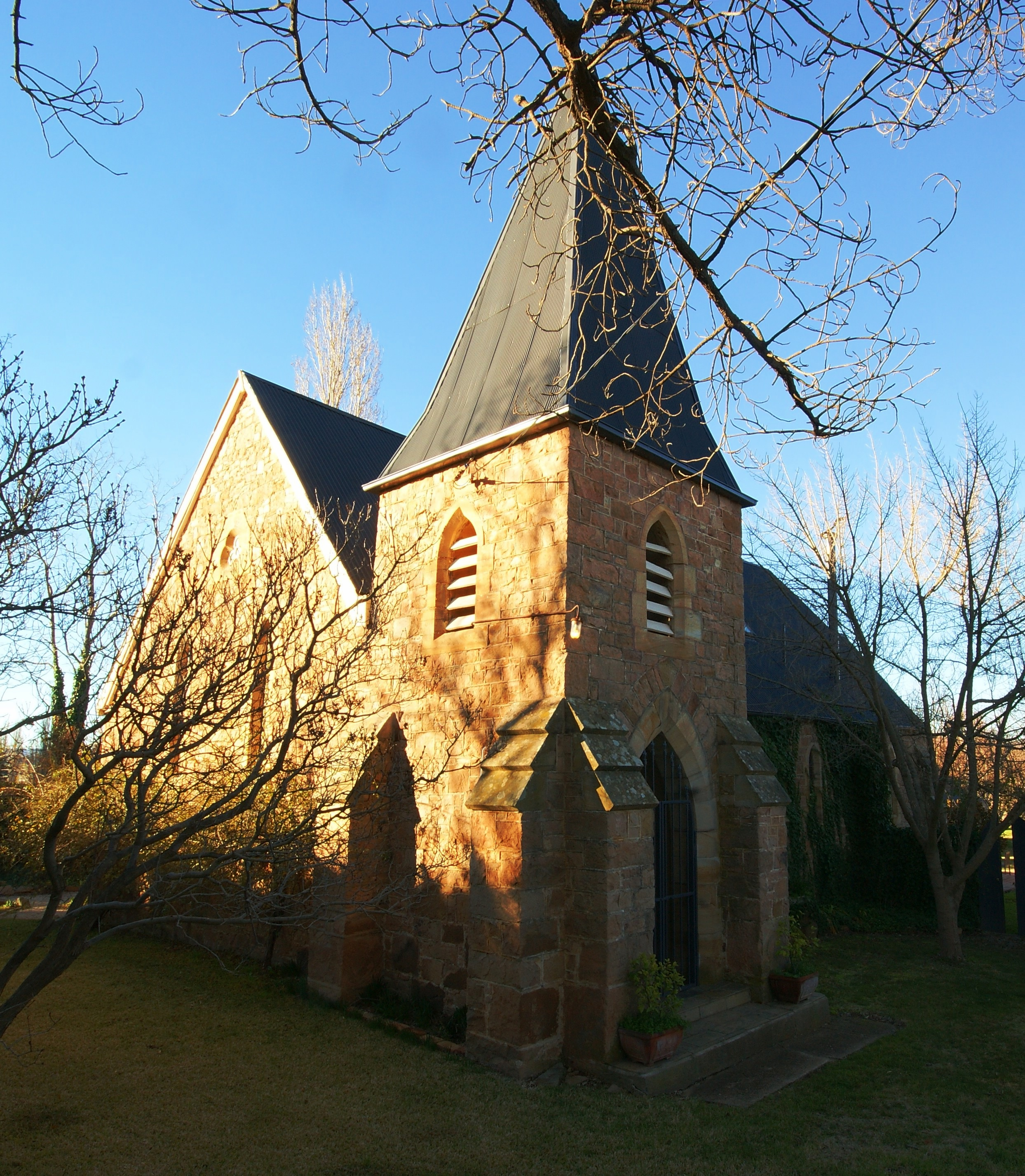
- Saint Francis of Assisi Church, O'Connell, New South Wales

- Coordinates: 33°33′S 149°44′E
- Population: 355 (2006 census)
- Postcode(s): 2795
- Elevation: 698 m (2,290 ft)
- Location: 185 km (115 mi) W of Sydney; 23 km (14 mi) SE of Bathurst; 57 km (35 mi) W of Lithgow; 25 km (16 mi) NW of Oberon
- LGA(s): Oberon Shire
- State electorate(s): Bathurst
- Federal division(s): Calare
Localities around O'Connell:
Brewongle	Brewongle	Wambool
The Lagoon	O'Connell	Locksley
Charlton	Wisemans Creek	Oberon

O’Connell is a village in New South Wales, Australia. The village, classified by the National Trust of Australia, is 23 kilometres from Oberon on the O'Connell Road. At the 2006 census, O'Connell and the surrounding area had a population of 355.

== History ==
The village has a long history, being situated on the original road between Bathurst and Sydney, which was in use until 1836. By the end of 1836 the road, now the Great Western Highway, was diverted and traffic proceeded via Rydal and Yetholme.

In 1813 George Evans crossed the Blue Mountains to confirm the findings of the exploration party of Blaxland, Lawson, and Wentworth. Evans and his party reached the end of the explorers' route at a point which Evans named Mount Blaxland, near the present locality of South Bowenfels. The party then moved further west and, near the junction of the Fish and Campbells Rivers, Evans described two plains in his view, the O'Connell Plains, which he named after the Lieutenant-Governor, Maurice Charles O'Connell, and the Macquarie Plains, named after Governor Lachlan Macquarie.

Evans wrote of O'Connell Plains: "...this Morning had a better appearance; the river now forms large ponds; at the Space of about a Mile I came on a fine Plain of rich Land, the handsomest Country I ever saw; it surpasseth Port Dalrymple; this place is worth speaking of as good and beautiful; the Track of clear land occupies about a Mile on each side of the River; I have named it after the Lieut. Governor, O'Connell Plains.'"

The Fish River is crossed at O'Connell on the Bathurst to Oberon Road. From that point, the Fish flows generally to the north-west to its confluence with Campbells River, to form the Macquarie River, which flows through Bathurst.

The existing hotel at O'Connell was built in 1865 and today is a popular meeting place in pleasant surroundings.

The historic former Catholic Church of St Francis of Assisi, built in the 1860s, has been restored as a dwelling. The attached cemetery has been closed for a considerable time. The Anglican Church of St Thomas is still in use. The cemetery attached to the church contains memorials as early as 1835.

O'Connell Post Office opened on 14 August 1834 and closed in 1980.

In 1890 a telephone line was constructed between O'Connell and Bathurst and O'Connell and Brewongle. Prior to this all communications to other centres were by the Morse Telegraph.

== Heritage listings ==
O'Connell has a number of heritage-listed sites, including:

- 2509 O'Connell Road: Lindlegreen Barn
