= Eglinton, New South Wales =

Eglinton Bathurst, New South Wales
- Coordinates: 33°22′38″S 149°32′48″E
- Population: 2,256 (2016 census)
- Postcode(s): 2795
- Elevation: 650 m (2,133 ft)
- Location: 7 km (4 mi) NNW of Bathurst
- LGA(s): Bathurst Region
- State electorate(s): Bathurst
- Federal division(s): Calare

Eglinton is a northern suburb of Bathurst, New South Wales, Australia, in the Bathurst Region.
