= Kelso, New South Wales =

Kelso
- Suburb
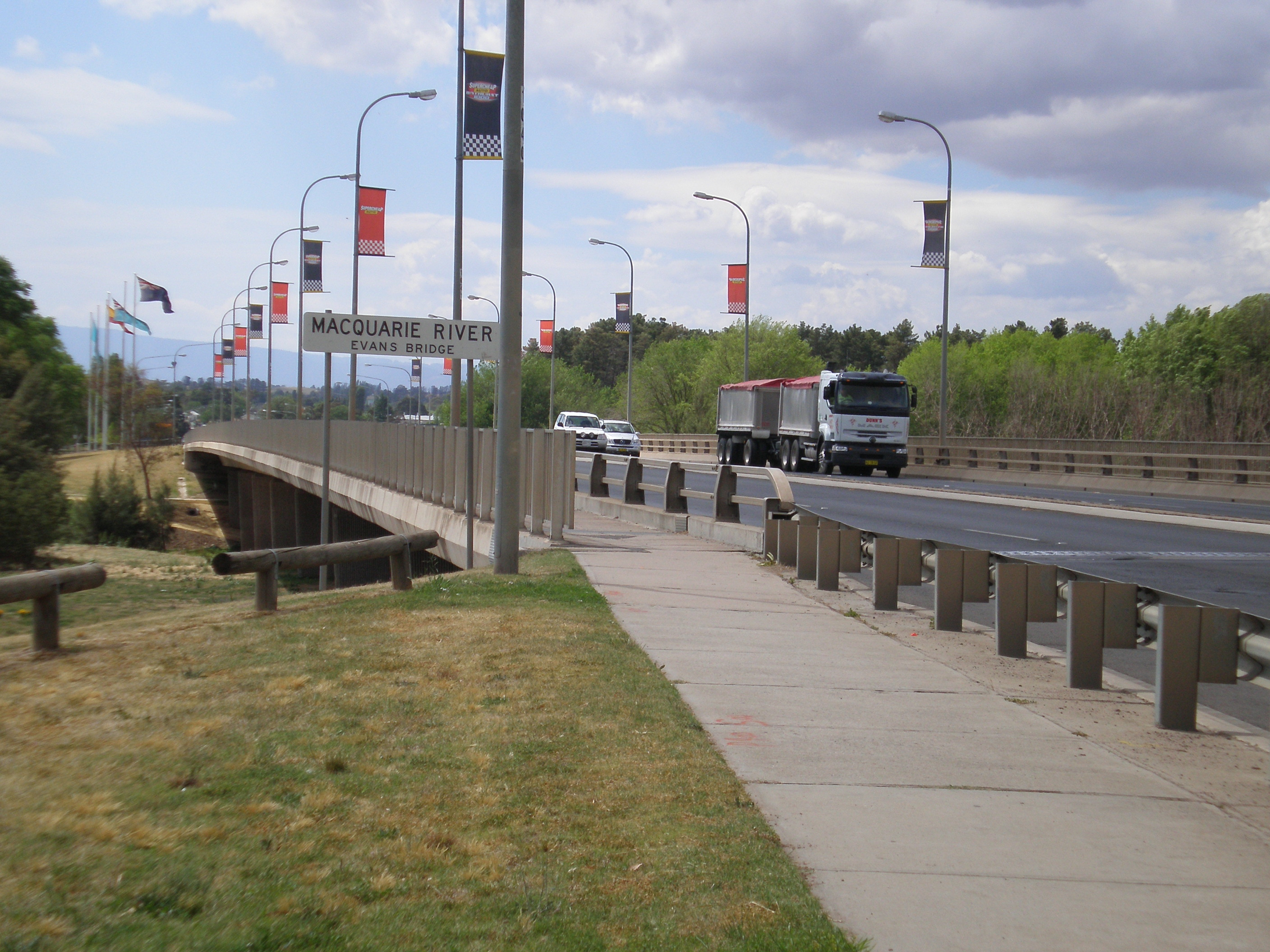
- Kelso, as seen from the Bathurst side of Evans Bridge, crossing the Macquarie River c. 2006

- Interactive map of Kelso
- Coordinates: 33°25′08″S 149°36′21″E
- Country: Australia
- State: New South Wales
- LGA: Bathurst Regional Council
- Location: 199 km (124 mi) WNW of Sydney; 57 km (35 mi) W of Lithgow; 4 km (2.5 mi) E of Bathurst
- Established: 1918

Government
  - State electorate: Bathurst
  - Federal division: Calare
- Elevation: 660 m (2,170 ft)

Population
  - Total: 8,968 (2016 census)
- Postcode: 2795
Suburbs around Kelso
Bathurst	Laffing Waters	Forest Grove
Bathurst	Kelso	Raglan
Gormans Hill	White Rock	Raglan

Kelso is a suburb of Bathurst, in New South Wales, Australia, located within the Bathurst Regional Council area.

== History ==
Kelso was the original European settlement in the area. In 1816, the initial settlement of Bathurst was established on the eastern banks of the Macquarie River, in current-day Kelso. The first ten farmers in Kelso were each given 50 acres (20 ha); five were newborn colonials and five were immigrants.

== Heritage listings ==
Kelso has a number of heritage-listed sites, including:

- 71-85 Gilmour Street: Holy Trinity Anglican Church

== Sights ==
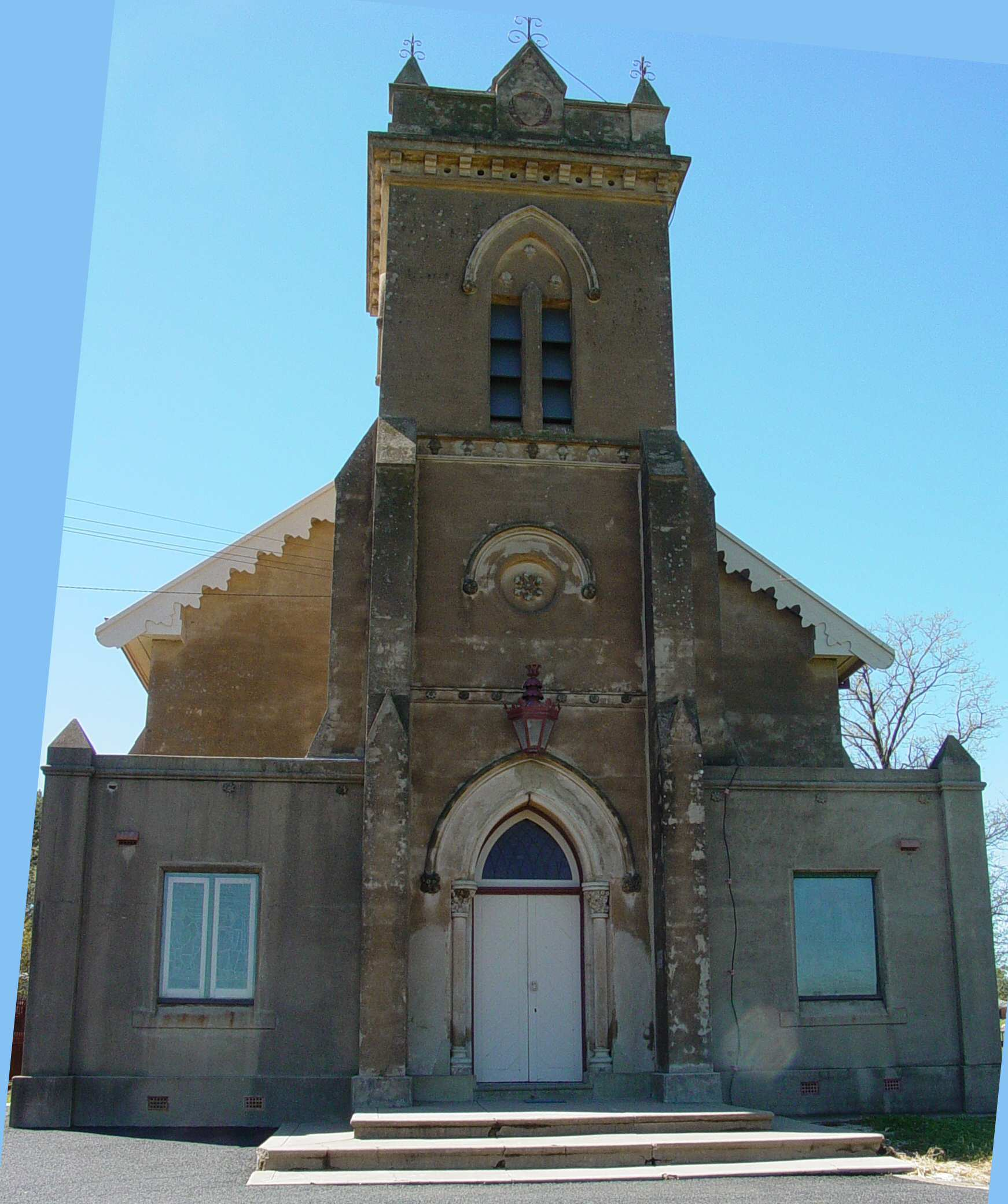
Holy Trinity Church

Holy Trinity Church was the first inland church in Australia. It was built in 1835 to serve the Anglican parish of Kelso. It was the first Australian church consecrated by a bishop. The church has a close association with early settlement west of the Great Dividing Range. The church is surrounded by an historical cemetery, which contains many of the Kelso/Bathurst district's pioneers.

== Education ==
Opening in 1976 and formally known as Kelso High School, the Kelso High Campus makes up the Denison College of Secondary Education along with Bathurst High Campus.

== Former station ==
Kelso previously had a railway station on the Main Western line. It opened on 4 February 1875 and was closed on 6 April 1975. It is now served by coach services.

Preceding station	Former services	Following station
Bathurst towards Bourke	Main Western Line	Raglan towards Sydney
