= Meadow Flat =

- Town
- Coordinates: 33°24′54″S 149°55′04″E
- Country: Australia
- State: New South Wales
- LGA: Bathurst Regional Council City of Lithgow

Government
  - State electorate: Bathurst
  - Federal division: Calare

Population
  - Total: 309 (2016 census)
- Postcode: 2795

Meadow Flat is a locality in the Bathurst Region and City of Lithgow of New South Wales, Australia. It had a population of 309 people as of the 2016 census.
