= Bathurst Regional Council =

- Local government area
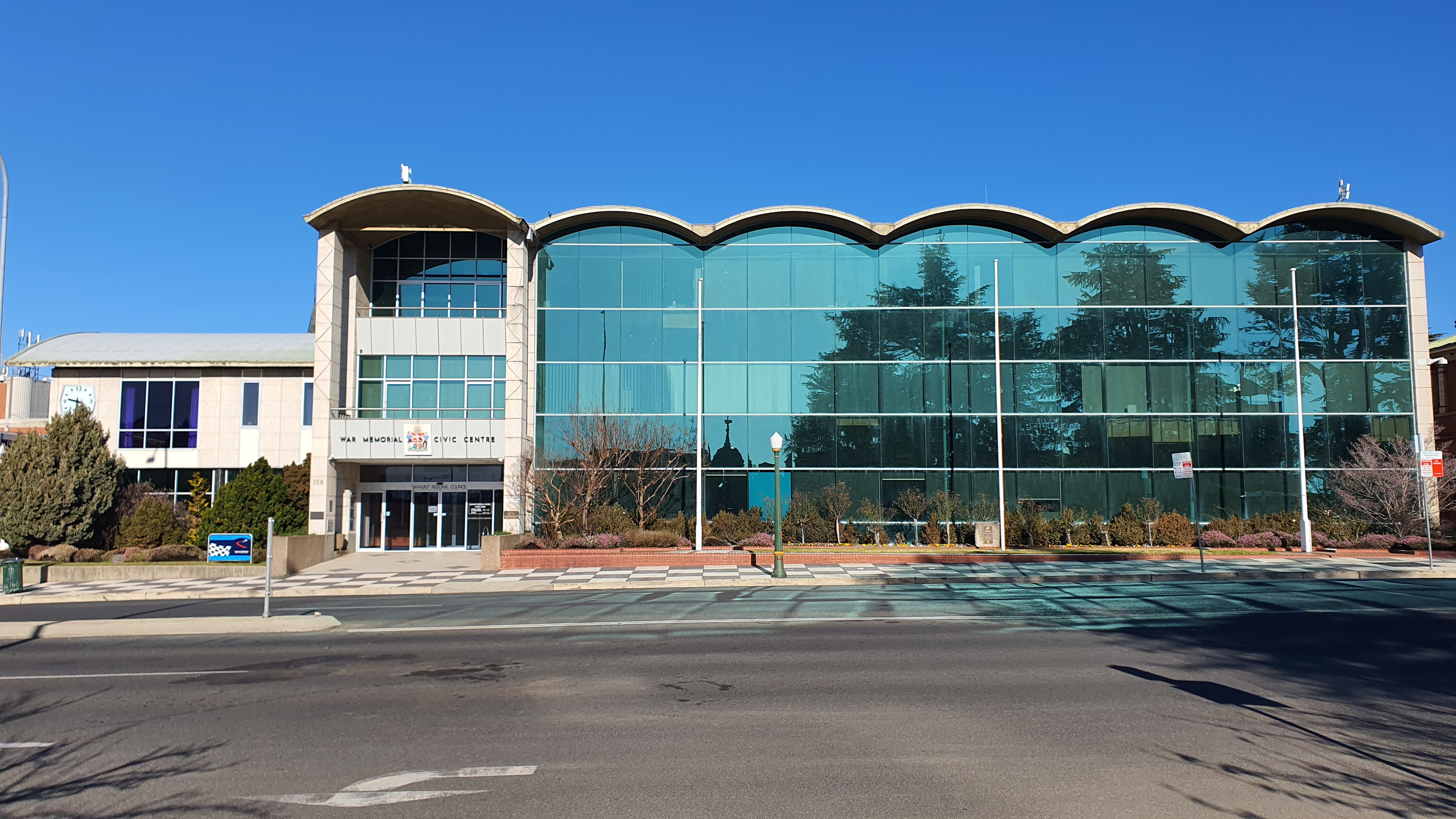
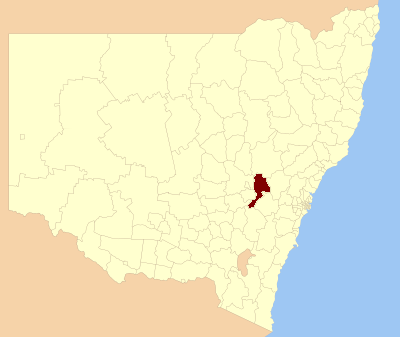
- Bathurst Civic Centre Location in New South Wales

- Interactive map of Bathurst Regional Council
- Coordinates: 33°25′S 149°34′E
- Country: Australia
- State: New South Wales
- Region: Central West
- Established: 26 May 2004
- Council seat: Bathurst

Government
  - Mayor: Ben Fry
  - State electorate: Bathurst
  - Federal division: Calare

Area
  - Total: 3,820 km^{2} (1,470 sq mi)

Population
  - Totals: 43,567 (LGA 2021); 43,206 (2018 est.)
- Website: Bathurst Regional Council
LGAs around Bathurst Regional Council
Cabonne	Mid-Western	Mid-Western
Orange	Bathurst Regional Council	Lithgow
Blayney	Upper Lachlan	Oberon

Bathurst Regional Council is a local government area in the Central West region of New South Wales, Australia. The area is located adjacent to the Great Western Highway, Mid-Western Highway, Mitchell Highway and the Main Western railway line. At the 2021 census, the Bathurst Region had a population of 43,567.

The administrative centre of the area is located in the city of Bathurst, approximately 200 kilometres (120 mi) west of Sydney.

The mayor of Bathurst is Ben Fry, deputy mayor being Sophie Wright, both unaligned politicians.

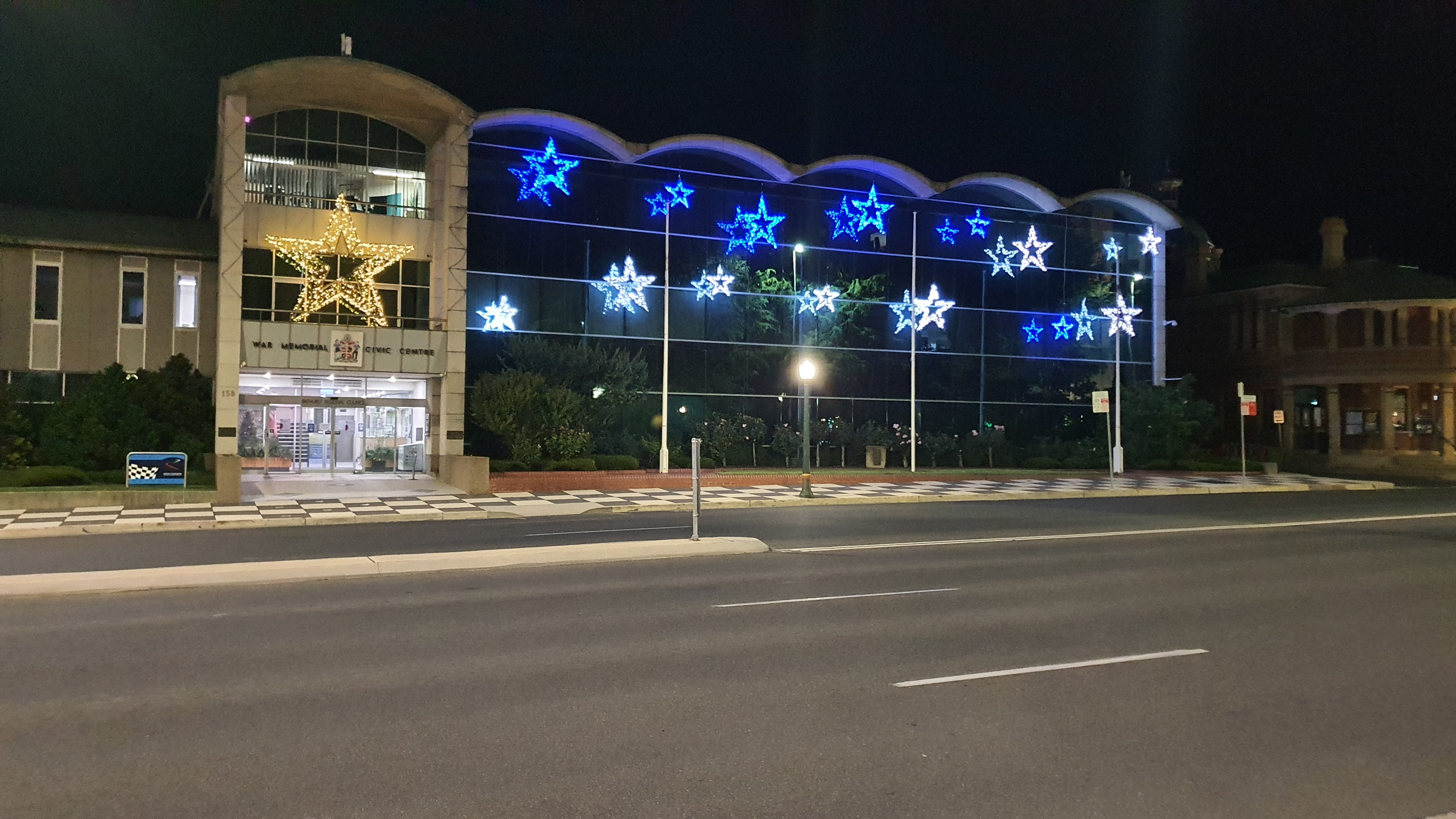
Bathurst Civic Centre at new year's eve (31/12/2021)

== City, towns and localities ==
In addition to the city of Bathurst, the LGA contains the villages of Eglinton, Freemantle, Perthville, Rockley, Raglan, Georges Plains, Trunkey Creek, Brewongle, Vittoria, Peel, Wattle Flat, Sofala, Hill End, Meadow Flat, Sallys Flat, Caloola and Kelso

== Demographics ==
Selected historical census data for Bathurst Regional local government area
Census year		2011	2016	2021
Population	Estimated residents on census night	38,519	▲41,300	▲43,567
Population	LGA rank in terms of size within New South Wales	52nd	▲51st	
Population	% of New South Wales population	0.56%	▼0.55%	▼0.53%
Population	% of Australian population	0.18%	0.18%	▼0.17%
Population	Estimated ATSI population on census night	1,634	▲2,244	▲3,153
Population	% of ATSI population to residents	4.20%	▲5.40%	▲7.2%
Cultural and language diversity				
Ancestry, top responses	Australian	32.9%	▼31.5%	▲42.1%
Ancestry, top responses	English	30.1%	▼29.5%	▲40.9%
Ancestry, top responses	Irish	10.9%	▲11.1%	▲14.3%
Ancestry, top responses	Scottish	7.3%	▲7.5%	▲10.6%
Ancestry, top responses	German	2.6%	2.6%	–
Ancestry, top responses	Australian Aboriginal	–	–	6.4%
Language, top responses (other than English)	Mandarin	0.2%	▲0.3%	▼0.2%
Language, top responses (other than English)	Arabic	0.3%	▼0.2%	▲0.3%
Language, top responses (other than English)	Cantonese	0.2%	0.2%	–
Language, top responses (other than English)	Punjabi	n/a	▲0.2%	▲0.4%
Language, top responses (other than English)	German	0.2%	0.2%	–
Language, top responses (other than English)	Nepali	–	–	0.4%
Language, top responses (other than English)	Tagalog	–	–	0.3%
Language, top responses (other than English)	Religious affiliation			
Religious affiliation, top responses	Catholic	34.1%	▼31.1%	▼28.4%
Religious affiliation, top responses	No religion, so described	16.0%	▲22.4%	▲32.4%
Religious affiliation, top responses	Anglican	23.2%	▼19.1%	▼15.7%
Religious affiliation, top responses	Not stated	n/a	11.3%	▼8.0%
Religious affiliation, top responses	Presbyterian and Reformed	4.6%	▼4.2%	▼3.4%
Median weekly incomes				
Personal income	Median weekly personal income	$544	▲$646	▲$796
Personal income	% of Australian median income	94.28%	▲97.58%	▲98.88%
Family income	Median weekly family income	$1,437	▲$1,632	$2,026
Family income	% of Australian median income	97.02%	▼94.11%	▲95.56%
Household income	Median weekly household income	$1,142	▼$1,310	▲$1,585
Household income	% of Australian median income	93%	▼92.54%	▼90.77%

== Council ==
=== Current composition and election method ===
Bathurst Regional Council is composed of nine councillors elected proportionally as a single ward. All councillors are elected for a fixed four-year term of office. The mayor is elected by the councillors at the first meeting of the council. The most recent election of councillors was held on 14 September 2024, and the makeup of the council is as follows:

== Council elected in 2024 ==
The current Council, elected in 2024, is:

Councillor	Party / Ticket	Notes
Ben Fry	Balanced Bathurst	Mayor (2026-present), Deputy Mayor (2021-2026)
Sophie Wright	Figuring It Out	Deputy Mayor (2026-present)
Warren Aubin	Bathurst United	
Natalie Cranston	Figuring It Out	
Tony Gullifer	Independent	
Nick Packham	Better Bathurst	Elected via count-back 26 Nov 2024
Robert 'Stumpy' Taylor	Team Back Bathurst	Mayor (2022-2023) (2024-2026)
Jaclyn Underwood	Balanced Bathurst	
Elaine West	The Greens NSW	

== Election results ==
=== 2024 ===
2024 New South Wales local elections: Bathurst
Party	Candidate	Votes	%	±%
Figuring It Out	1. Sophie Wright (elected 1); 2. Natalie Cranston (elected 4); 3. Anne Balcomb; 4. Jeffery Muir; 5. Rowan Bracken; 6. Gavin Press; 7. Fiona Carlisle	7,520	29.7	
Balanced Bathurst	1. Ben Fry (elected 2); 2. Jaclyn Underwood (elected 7); 3. Beau Yates; 4. Jasmyn Nankervis; 5. Kirralee Burke	4,565	18.0	−2.0
Better Bathurst	1. Jess Jennings (elected 3, resigned 2024); 2. Nick Packham (replaced Jennings on council); 3. Sharon Sewell; 4. Shona Kennedy; 5. Angus Thompson	2,972	11.7	+3.4
Team Back Bathurst	1. Robert (Stumpy) Taylor (elected 6); 2. Timothy Fagan; 3. Kelly Richardson; 4. James Connors; 5. Rebecca Mathie	1,866	7.4	−10.1
Independent	Tony Gullifer (elected 5)	1,844	7.3	
Greens	1. Elaine West (elected 9); 2. Elizabeth Barrett; 3. Cath Jackson; 4. Steph Luke; 5. Julie Kramer	1,455	5.8	
Bathurst United	1. Warren Aubin (elected 8); 2. Lachlan Host; 3. Andrew Sherlock; 4. Teodora Todorova; 5. Warren McCaull	1,292	5.1	+0.5
Responsible Financial Management	1. Geoff Fry; 2. Juanita Kwok; 3. Margaret Hargans; 4. Michael McCormick; 5. Rob Quinn	877	3.5	+1.9
Commitment To Our Community	1. Graeme Hanger; 2. Luisa Simeonidis	669	2.6	−4.4
Bathurst Matters	1. Stuart Pearson; 2. Ingrid Pearson; 3. Pauline Graf; 4. Irene Hancock; 5. Timothy Herbert	616	2.4	−0.8
Independent	Ian North	547	2.2	−7.8
Independent	Liam O'Hara	534	2.1	
Together We Can Fix This	1. Stuart Driver; 2. Larry Lewis	306	1.2	0.0
Independent	Marilyn Osborne	168	0.7	
Independent	Gordon Crisp	78	0.3	
Total formal votes		25,309	91.8	−0.9
Informal votes		2,255	8.2	+0.9
Turnout		27,564	87.1	+0.8

=== 2021 ===
Elected councillor	Party
Ben Fry	Balanced Bathurst
Kirralee Burke	Balanced Bathurst
Ian North	TEAM NORTH
Marg Hogan	Marg Hogan Team
Graeme Hanger	Team Hanger
Jess Jennings	Better Bathurst
Robert 'Stumpy' Taylor	Back Bathurst
Andrew 'Struthy' Smith	Back Bathurst
Warren Aubin	Bathurst First

2021 New South Wales local elections: Bathurst
Party	Candidate	Votes	%	±%
Balanced Bathurst		4,943	20.0	
Back Bathurst		4,334	17.5	
TEAM NORTH		2,475	10.0	
Marg Hogan Team		2,119	8.6	
Better Bathurst		2,057	8.3	
Team Hanger – Working Together for Bathurst		1,737	7.0	
The Restore Bathurst Team		1,458	5.9	
Nick Packham for Bathurst		1,244	5.0	
Bathurst First		1,125	4.6	
Bathurst Matters		792	3.2	
Independent	Alex Christian	733	3.0	
TEAM BOURKE	Bobby Bourke	456	1.8	
Independent (Group J)		393	1.6	
Independent	Stuart Driver	292	1.2	
Team Singleton		214	0.9	
Independent	Catherine Strods	129	0.5	
Independent	Steve Semmens	105	0.4	
TEAM BOURKE	Jeff Muir	42	0.2	
TEAM BOURKE	Steve Ellery	25	0.1	
TEAM BOURKE	Ken Hope	21	0.1	
TEAM BOURKE	Michael Forde	10	0.0	
Total formal votes		24,704	92.7	
Informal votes		1,939	7.3	
Turnout			86.3	

=== 2017 ===
Elected councillor	Party
Bobby Bourke	TEAM BOURKE
Jacqui Rudge	TEAM BOURKE
Ian North	TEAM NORTH
Warren Aubin	Bathurst First
Alex Christian	Ind. SFF
Graeme Hanger	Independent (Group G)
Jess Jennings	Independent (Group C)
John Fry	Greens
Monica Morse	Independent (Group B)

2017 New South Wales local elections: Bathurst
Party	Candidate	Votes	%	±%
TEAM BOURKE		4,745	20.4	
Independent (Group G)		4,634	19.9	
Bathurst First		2,571	11.1	
Independent SFF	Alex Christian	2,190	9.4	
TEAM NORTH		2,093	9.0	
Independent (Group C)		2,118	9.1	
Independent (Group B)		1,945	8.4	
Greens		1,617	7.0	
Independent Labor	Nick Packham	926	4.0	
Independent (Group F)		421	1.8	
Total formal votes		23,260	93.55	
Informal votes		1,605	6.45	
Turnout		24,865	84.86	

== History ==
Bathurst was proclaimed a city in 1885. The Bathurst Region was created on 26 May 2004 as a result of a merger of Bathurst City and Evans Shire.

A 2015 review of local government boundaries recommended that the Bathurst Region merge with the Oberon Shire to form a new council with an area of 7,443 square kilometres (2,874 sq mi) and support a population of approximately 47,000. The outcome of an independent review was expected to be completed by mid–2016. Bathurst Regional Council was officially notified on 6 March 2017 by the NSW State Government that the proposed merger between Bathurst Regional Council and Oberon Council will not proceed. The letter from the Minister for Local Government Gabrielle Upton advising Council of the decision can be viewed on the Bathurst Regional Council official website.

== Sister cities ==
Bathurst has had a sister city relationship with Ohkuma (Japan) since March 1991.The relationship provides an opportunity for both Bathurst and Ohkuma residents to learn about each other's culture and language. As part of the relationship Council coordinates the Sister City Working Party. This group is made up of different community members who have an interest in Japan and further developing the strong relationship that already exists between Bathurst and Ohkuma. Bathurst has sister city relations with the following city:

- Ōkuma, Japan, since 1991
