= Tarana Quarry railway station =

Former railway station in New South Wales, Australia

Tarana Quarry
- Tarana Quarry railway station, 6th March 1965

General information
- Location: Vicinity of Tarana; New South Wales; Australia
- Coordinates: 33.5158°S 149.8647°E
- Operator: Public Transport Commission
- Line: Main Western
- Distance: 203.190 km (126.256 mi) from Central
- Platforms: 2 (2 side)
- Tracks: 2

Construction
- Structure type: Ground

Other information
- Status: Demolished

History
- Opened: 1890 (136 years ago)
- Closed: 24 August 1974 (52 years ago)
- Former names: Tarana Quarry School Platform (1890–1905); Quarries (1905–1909)

Services
Preceding station	Former services	Following station
Gemalla towards Bourke	Main Western Line	Tarana towards Sydney
Location

Tarana Quarry railway station was a regional railway station located on the Main Western line, serving the nearby quarries within the Central West town of Tarana.

== History ==
The station opened in 1890 as Tarana Quarry School Platform and was renamed Quarries in June 1905. It was once again renamed Tarana Quarry on 24 October 1909 and remained so until it was closed on 24 August 1974. The station had a subsidiary lever frame that was released by track circuit to allow the siding to be shunted from either direction, as the station was too close to Tarana station to divide the section equally. During 1916, automatic signals were added to Tarana Quarry due to the station's proximity to Gemalla Loop.

Today, there are no traces of any railway infrastructure near the location of the former station, the area now incorporated into the Eusdale Nature Reserve.
