= Bathurst Bullet =

Passenger train connecting Sydney and Bathurst, Australia

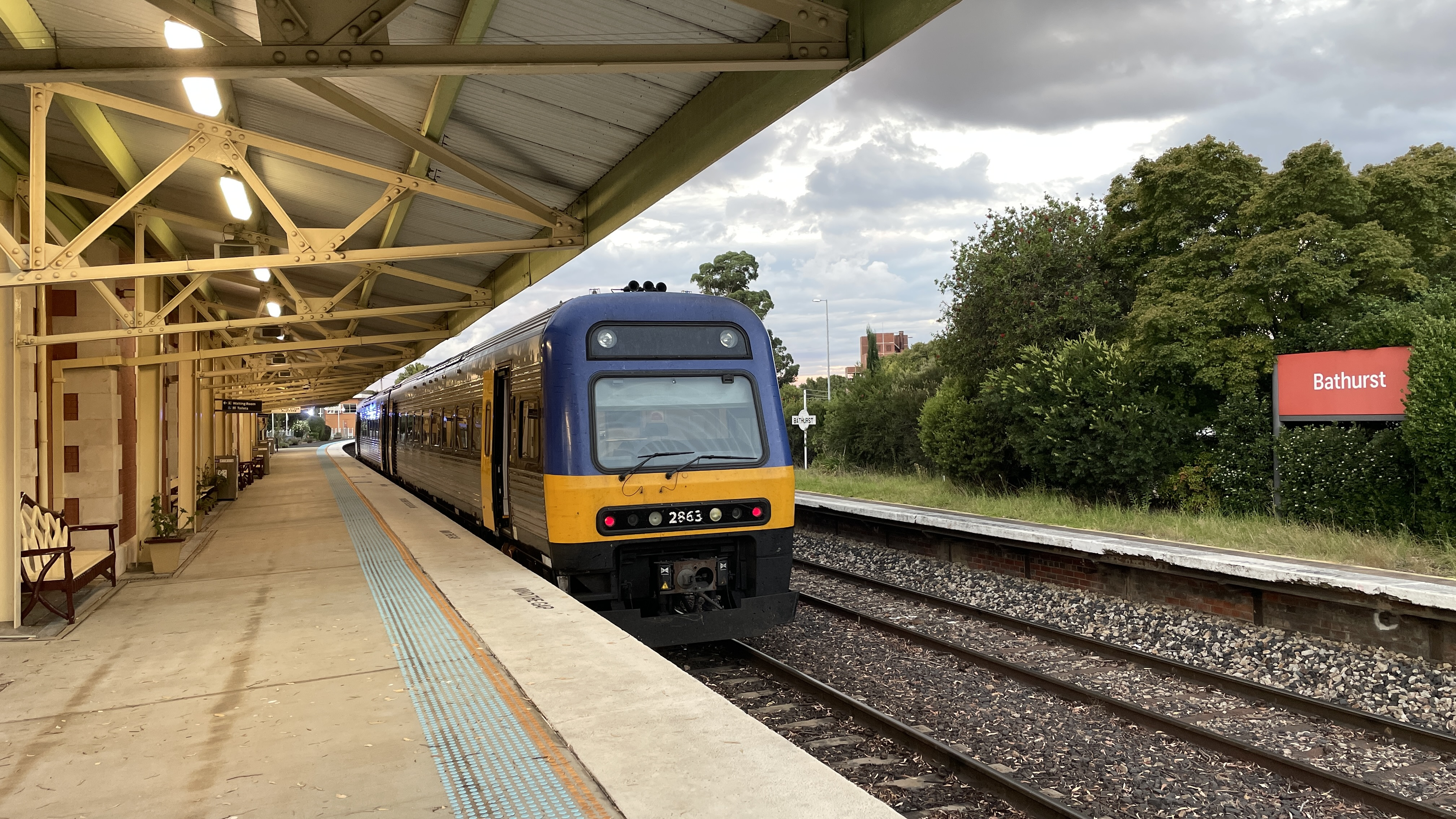
- Endeavour at Bathurst in 2025

Overview
- Service type: Passenger train
- First service: 21 October 2012
- Current operator: Sydney Trains
- Former operators: NSW TrainLink (2013–2024); CityRail (2012–2013)

Route
- Termini: Sydney; Bathurst
- Distance travelled: 240 kilometres
- Service frequency: Twice daily in each direction
- Train number: WN12, WN18, WN16
- Line used: Main Western

Technical
- Rolling stock: Endeavour railcar

The Bathurst Bullet is an express passenger train on the Blue Mountains Line operated by Sydney Trains between Sydney and Bathurst. The service operates from Bathurst towards Sydney in the morning, and returns in the afternoon.

== History ==
At the 2011 election, the incoming Liberal/National coalition government committed to introduce a day return service from Bathurst to Sydney for those working in Sydney.

Bathurst was already served by the daily Central West XPT and weekly Outback Xplorer services, but these were morning departures from Sydney, returning in the afternoon. The last day return service to Sydney had ceased in November 1988, being replaced by road coach services connecting with train services at Lithgow.

The Bathurst Bullet commenced operating on 21 October 2012. It is operated by a diesel-powered two-carriage Endeavour railcar. Upon reaching Bathurst, it returns to Lithgow to stable overnight. During periods of high demand such as the Sydney Royal Easter Show, it is operated by two sets.

In March 2014, a submission was made to extend the service to Orange. The submission to extend the train service was not successful but a connecting road coach service commenced 15 June 2015 for a six-month trial instead. Since October 2019, all Bullet services have a road coach connecting with Orange.

In August 2019, the NSW Government announced that a second daily return Bullet service would be implemented. The new service commenced on 16 September 2019, with both now stopping at Tarana and Rydal. On Wednesdays, the second train operates to a slightly delayed schedule in order to accommodate the Indian Pacific.
