= Gemalla, New South Wales =

Gemalla New South Wales
- Coordinates: 33°28′45″S 149°42′56″E
- Population: 24 (SAL 2021)
- Postcode(s): 2795
- Elevation: 777 m (2,549 ft)
- Location: 170 km (106 mi) WNW of Sydney; 39 km (24 mi) W of Lithgow; 32 km (20 mi) ESE of Bathurst; 33 km (21 mi) N of Oberon
- LGA(s): Bathurst Region
- State electorate(s): Bathurst
- Federal division(s): Calare
Localities around Gemalla:
Wambool	Yetholme	Meadow Flat
Locksley	Gemalla	Tarana
Locksley	Hazelgrove	Tarana

Gemalla (/dʒəˈmælə/ jə-MAL-ə) is a locality in western New South Wales, Australia. It is located on the Main Western railway line between Tarana and Locksley. A railway station was provided between 1907 and 1974.

Preceding station	Former services	Following station
Locksley towards Bourke	Main Western Line	Tarana towards Sydney
