= Burraga =

- Town
- Coordinates: 33°57′0″S 149°32′45″E
- Country: Australia
- State: New South Wales
- LGA: Oberon

Government
  - State electorate: Bathurst
  - Federal division: Calare

Population
  - Total: 82 (SAL 2021)
- Postcode: 2795
- County: Georgiana
- Parish: Jeremy, Thompson

Burraga is located in the Central Tablelands of New South Wales, 47 kilometres south west of Oberon and about 67 kilometres (42 mi) south of Bathurst. It is within Oberon Shire. At the 2016 census, Burraga had a population of 91, declining to 82 in 2021.

== History ==
=== Aboriginal and early settler history ===
The area now known as Burraga lies on the traditional lands of the Wiradjuri people. The name Burraga is almost certainly a settler rendering of an Aboriginal language word. Sydney J. Endacott (Australian Aboriginal Words and Place Names and Their Meanings, 1959) states that Burraga means "Bitter Swamp". Burraga is also the name of the cadastral parish on the northern side of Thompson's Creek.

=== Mining ===
Copper was discovered around 1877 and was reported on by the inspector of mines in 1878. Mining commenced at the Thompsons Creek copper mine, but was hampered by poor management and under capitalisation, until the mine was purchased in 1879 by Lewis Lloyd, who was known as "the copper king". The mine then became known as Lloyd's Copper Mine. Lloyd built reverberatory smelting furnaces near the mine. By 1900, it had produced over £1,000,000 worth of copper.

In 1899, Lloyd sold his interest in the mine at Burraga to an English company for £100,000, and the mine became the Lloyd Copper Company Mine. Mining and smelting at Burraga had been hindered by the availability of water and fuel for the furnaces; the new owners set about solving these issues. Construction of a concrete dam on Thompson's Creek was completed in 1901 although, due to a drought, the dam did not fill completely with water until 1903. However, the new owners' attempt to change the smelting process, from using reverberatory furnaces to pyritic smelting in a water jacket blast furnace, was a total failure. Although a large sum was invested in the operation, there had been some poor decisions made. By 1908, the mine operations were in jeopardy, due to a scarcity of fuel, and the mine closed in May that year. The only remaining mining going on to support the village was at the nearby Mt David Gold Mine.

The Lloyd mine appears to have reopened around 1912, with another round of capital investment. A narrow-gauge tramway that used two Shay locomotives was constructed around 1912–1913 to bring timber fuel to the smelter. A fire in late 1913 destroyed one of the locomotives. Falling copper prices led to another closure of the mine in July 1914. The entire mine and associated assets were sold, on behalf of creditors, in 1916, for a mere £5,680. The new owners had the mine, now called the Abercrombie Copper Mine, in production again in March 1917, but problems obtaining enough timber for fuel continued to lead to temporary closures. By mid-1918, wartime shipping conditions had made it impossible to export copper, already sold to the British Government, from N.S.W.; the smelter at Burraga closed in August 1918, with the ore being sent instead to Port Kembla, via the railway station at Perthville.

The mine closed down, in January 1919, and equipment from the operation, including the remaining Shay locomotive, was sold off in 1920. A long-awaited branch railway line from Tarana to Burraga, which would have allowed coal to be brought to the smelters or ore to be shipped more economically, was built only as far as Oberon; it opened in November 1923.

Mining continued on and off up until 1961. Studies were being conducted around 2012, looking for worthwhile lodes of copper and gold at the nearby Lucky Draw Gold Mine.

=== Private town and village of Burraga ===
The first settlement at Burraga was a private township on the mining lease of the Thompsons Creek copper mine. As the mine expanded, workers settled on the nearby land resulting in the reservation of a site for a village, immediately to the east of the private township, in October 1883. In 1883, the mine employed about 200 men and that the population of Burraga was about 500 persons including 60 children. The village had "the usual businesses", a post office and a public school, which opened in November 1883. Therefore, even before the village had been planned, a significant settlement and population existed in the area.

The new village was surveyed in December 1884 and a formal plan was reserved on 29 October 1887. The reserve for a road (then known as Mine Street) linking the private township to the new village was surveyed in 1886, but actually contained a number of the town's existing buildings; the road reserve was resurveyed in 1900 to overcome that deficiency. The boundary of the mine's land constrained the alignment of Lloyd Street, so that it intersects the other streets of the village at an angle. The existence of the earlier private township explains why some of Burraga's buildings lie to the west, outside the planned village street grid ending at Lloyd Street. Allotments and former streets of the former private township, to the west of Lloyd Street, are still shown on Google Maps.

As there were no other industries to provide employment the fortunes of the village rose and fell in line with those of the copper mine. The population seems to have peaked in the early 1900s, at around 2,000, during the construction of the new plant at the mine site. When the mine closed for the first time, in 1908, the population was still around 1,500. The population had fallen to 747, in 1911, the year before the mine reopened. It then rose again to around 1,400 to 1500, but after the mine closed for a second time in 1914, the population slumped to only 250 by 1916. Just after the final mine closure, in 1919, the population was 1,231. By 1924, the village's population was only 124.

The village had two hotels; the Royal Hotel was destroyed by fire in 1932 and the Burraga Hotel was closed in 1933, and its disused building was also destroyed by fire in 1942.

Burraga had a Union Church, Anglican and Catholic churches. The only surviving church is St Dympna's Catholic church, dating from 1941, which is still in use.

The public school first closed in December 2006, reopened in February 2009, and finally closed in December 2016.

From around 1900 to around 1915, Estonian-born photographer Evan Antoni Johann Lumme (1865–1935) made photographs of Burraga and some of its inhabitants. Some of these photographs are in the collection of the National Library of Australia.

== Present day ==
Little remains of the copper mine's operations today; the single remaining tall brick chimney that dominates the site is a remnant of the failed attempt at pyritic smelting, the Burraga Dam on Thompson's Creek survives as a popular angling venue, and there are remnant shafts and slag heaps at the sites of the mine and smelters. The mine site is viewed as a prospective film location, as is the village.

The village of Burraga is a quiet place now, but still has a community hall, and a village store that is a postal agency. Aside from limited tourism for camping and angling, the economy of the village relies on grazing, nearby softwood forestry plantations, and sawmilling. The War Memorial Obelisk, in the village's War Memorial Park, commemorates the men who went from Burraga to the two world wars. The Burraga Sports and Services Club serves the village and nearby area.

== Gallery ==
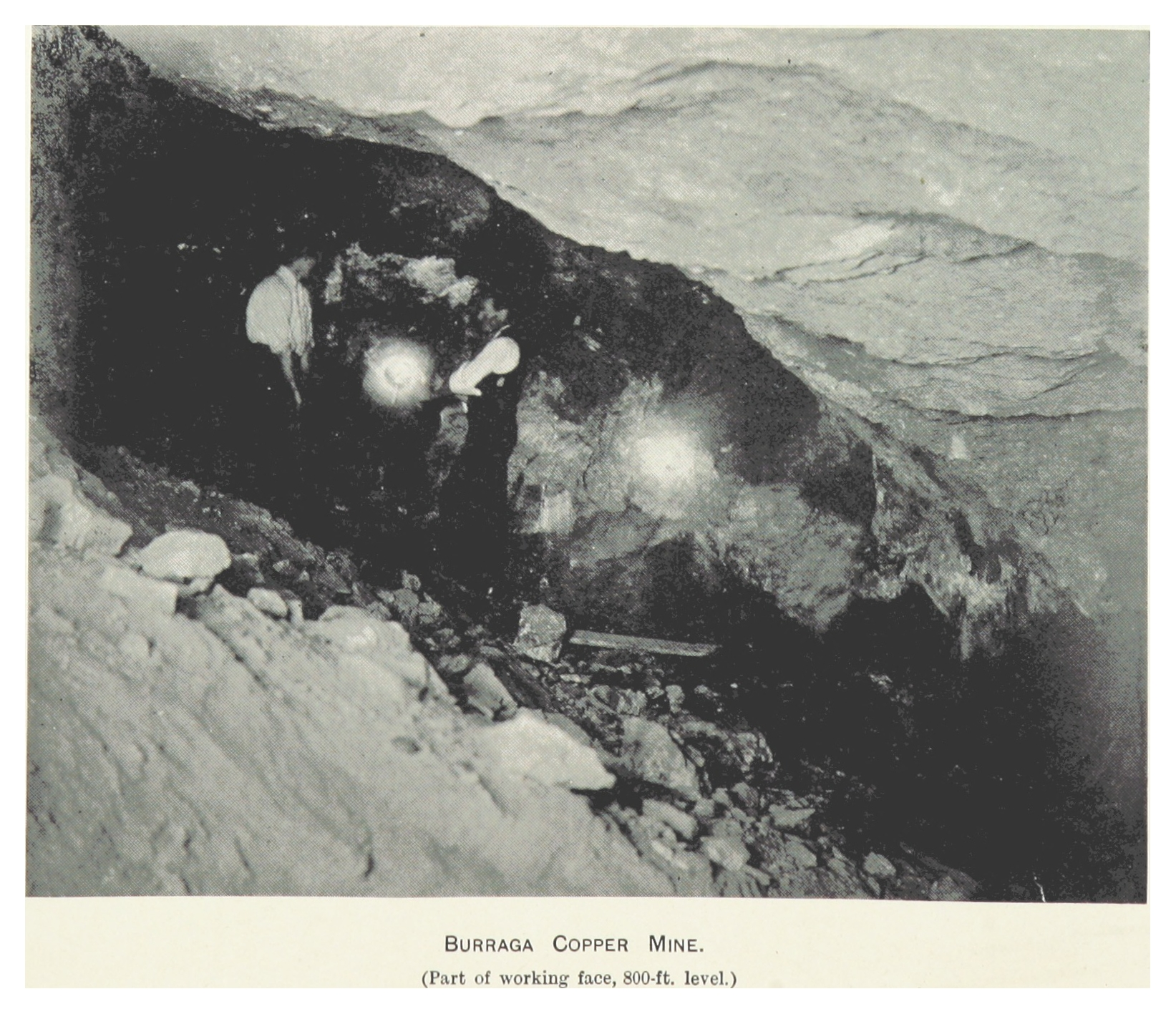
Underground workings of the copper mine (c. 1899)

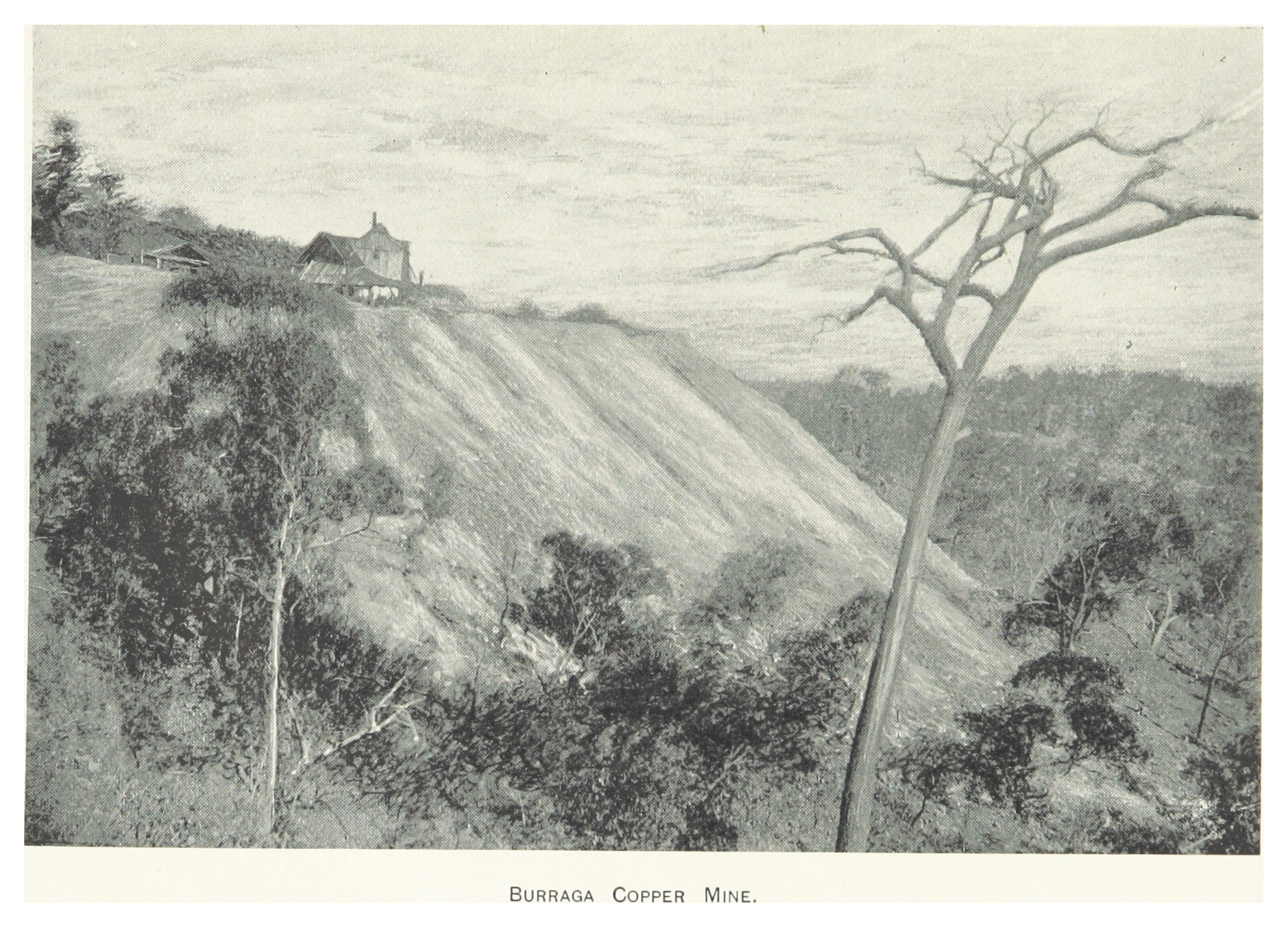
Burraga copper mine smelters (c. 1899)

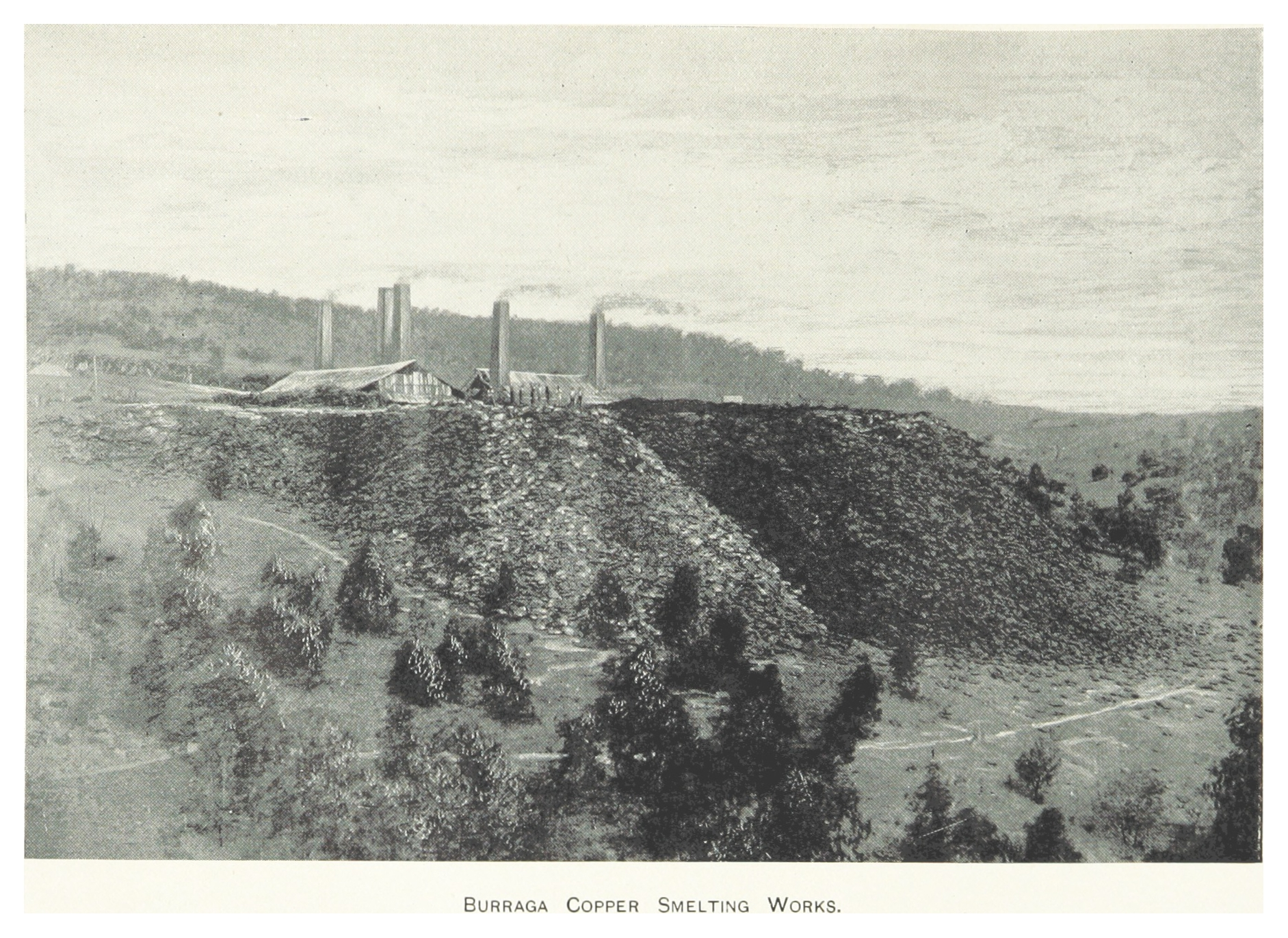
Burraga copper mine smelters (c. 1899)

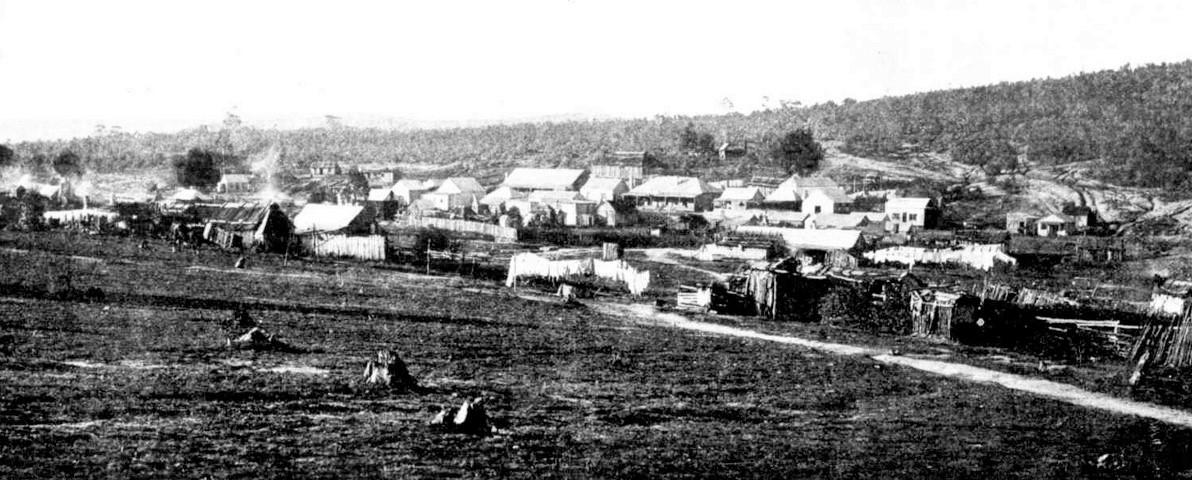
Burraga, mining village c. 1900
