= New South Wales Endeavour railcar =

Class of diesel multiple units operating in New South Wales, Australia

Endeavour
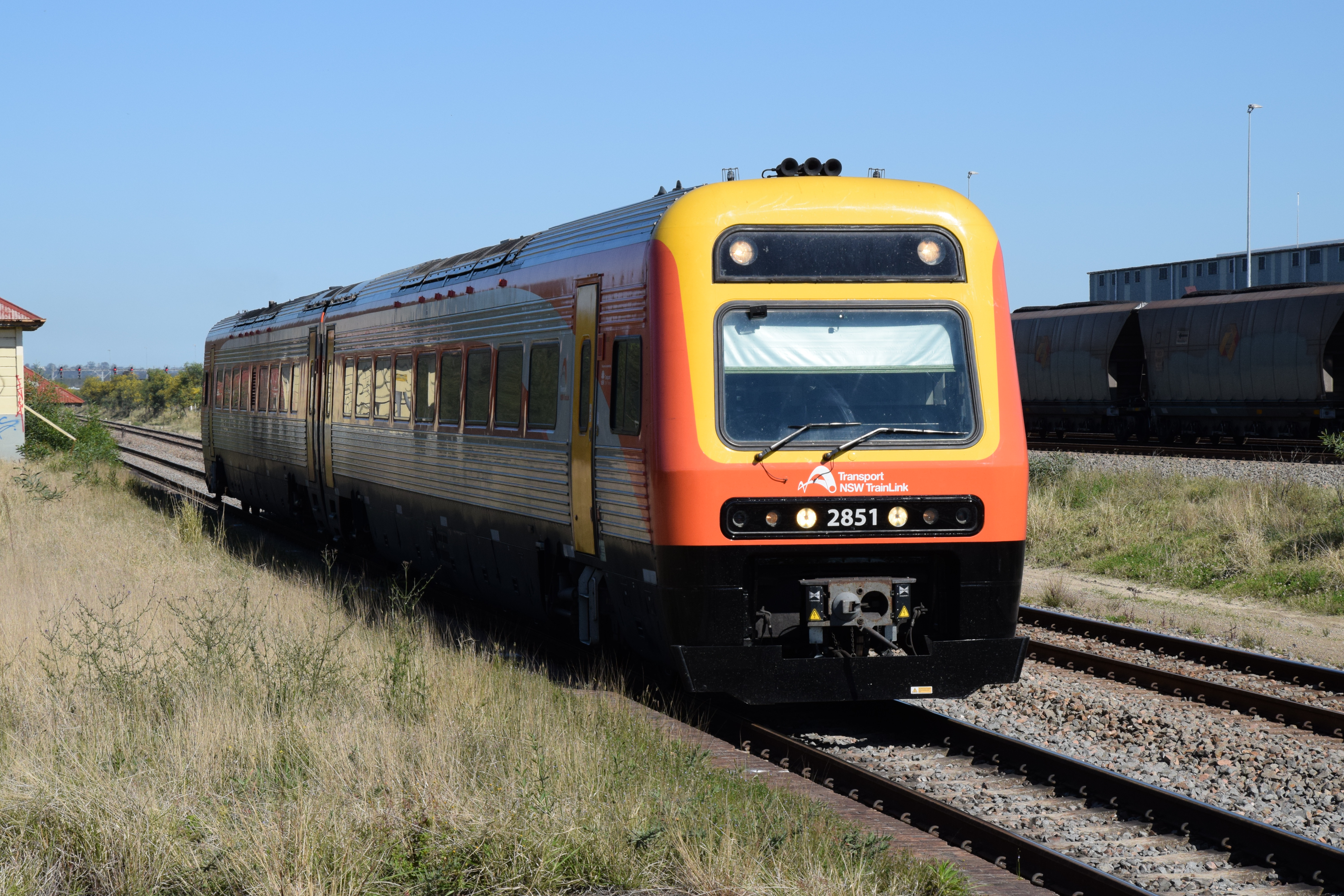
- 2851 and 2801 at Hexham in NSW TrainLink livery

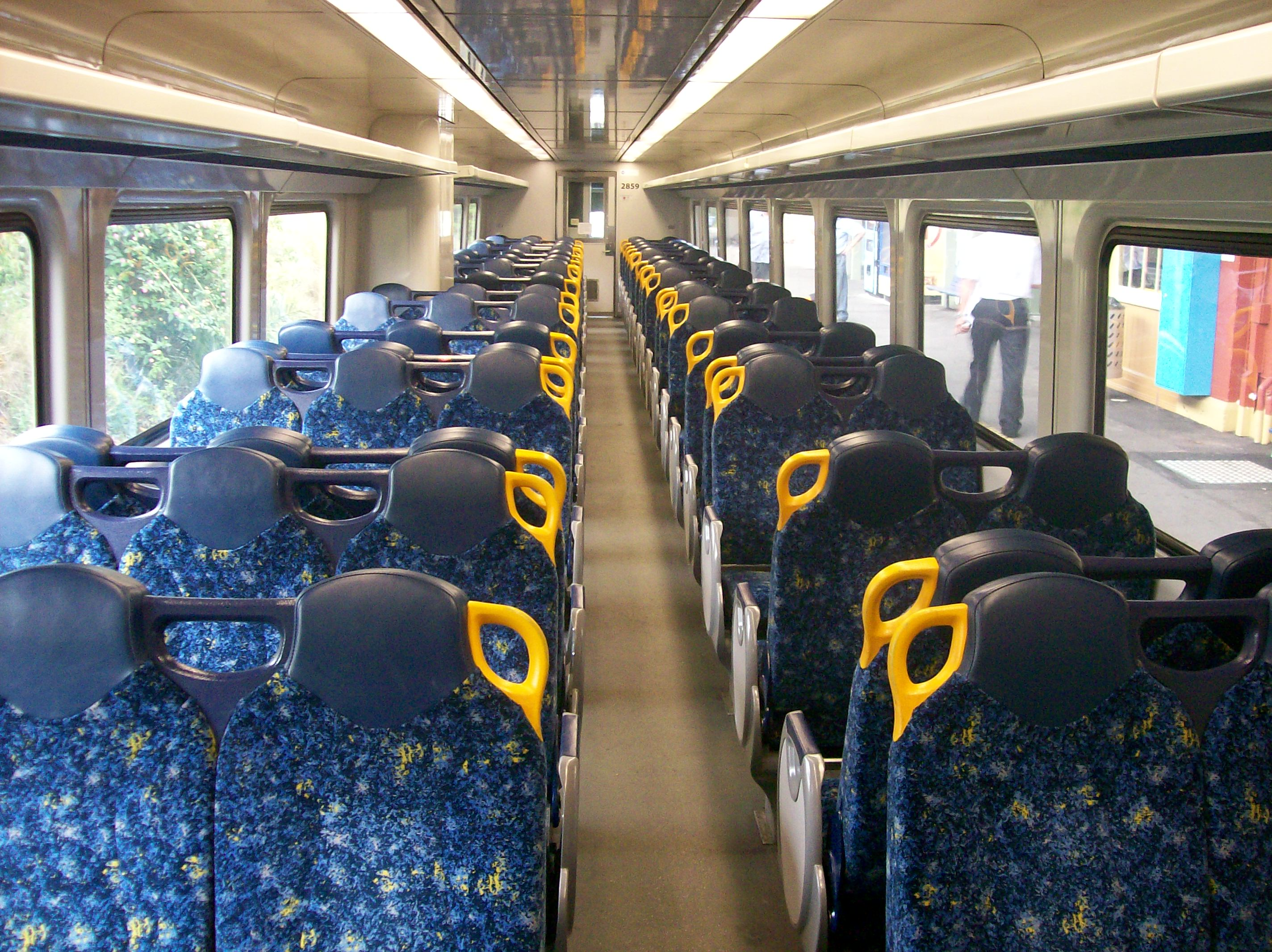
- Refurbished interior
- Stock type: Diesel multiple unit
- In service: 1994–present
- Manufacturer: ABB
- Built at: Dandenong
- Replaced: 620/720 class railcars, DEB set railcars, Tulloch railcars
- Constructed: 1994–1996
- Entered service: March 1994
- Refurbished: 2009–2010, 2017
- Number built: 30 carriages (15 sets)
- Number in service: 28 carriages (14 sets)
- Successor: R set
- Formation: 2-car sets
- Fleet numbers: TE 2801–2815; LE 2851–2865
- Capacity: 95 (TE) 82 (LE)
- Operator: Sydney Trains
- Lines served: Blue Mountains (primarily between Lithgow and Bathurst, with daily services to and from Central); South Coast (between Kiama and Bomaderry); Southern Highlands; Hunter

Specifications
- Train length: 50.5 m (165 ft 8 in)
- Car length: 25.25 m (82 ft 10 in)
- Width: 2.92 m (9 ft 7 in)
- Height: 4.11 m (13 ft 6 in)
- Doors: Single leaf plug door, two per side per car
- Maximum speed: 160 km/h (99 mph) (design); 145 km/h (90 mph) (service)
- Weight: 56.6 t (55.7 long tons; 62.4 short tons) (TE); 57.2 t (56.3 long tons; 63.1 short tons) (LE)
- Prime mover: Cummins KTA-19R
- Power output: 383 kW (514 hp)
- Transmission: Voith T311r KB260, with Voith Turbo V15 20 final drive
- Auxiliaries: Cummins LT10R(G) – 135 kW (181 hp)
- Bogies: PJA (Power), NJA (Trailer)
- Coupling system: Scharfenberg
- Track gauge: 1,435 mm (4 ft 8 1/2 in) standard gauge

The Endeavour railcars are a type of diesel multiple units (DMU) operated by Sydney Trains on intercity passenger rail services in New South Wales, Australia on the Hunter, Blue Mountains (to Bathurst), Southern Highlands and South Coast (to Bomaderry) lines. They are mechanically identical to the Xplorers, but are fitted out for shorter travel distances. All 30 carriages were built by ABB's Dandenong rolling stock factory.

Fourteen two-carriage sets were ordered in April 1992 to replace Class 620/720 railcars, DEB set railcars and locomotive hauled stock, with the first entering service in March 1994. In November 1994, one further two-carriage set was ordered. Some Endeavours are scheduled to be replaced in 2026–2027 by the R sets.

The trains have multiple-unit capability with the Hunter J Set but only in the event of failure or for empty coaching stock movements. These cars normally operate as two-car sets, however during peak periods they can operate as four-car sets.

== Features ==
Each set consists of two carriages, one having a wheelchair-accessible toilet (TE), and the other having luggage space and bicycles racks (LE). All cars are air-conditioned. They operate as four carriage sets on a few peak hour services.

Each car is powered by a Cummins KTA-19R diesel engine rated at 383 kW (514 hp) at 1800rpm coupled to a Voith T311r hydraulic transmission driving both axles on one bogie via Voith Turbo V15/19 final drives. The transmission incorporates a Voith KB260/r hydrodynamic brake. An auxiliary 135 kW (181 hp) Cummins LT10R(G) diesel engine drives a Newage Stamford UCI274F alternator to supply power for the air conditioning and lighting.

The maximum speed of Endeavour railcars is 160 km/h (99 mph) but in service this is limited to 145 km/h (90 mph).

== In service ==
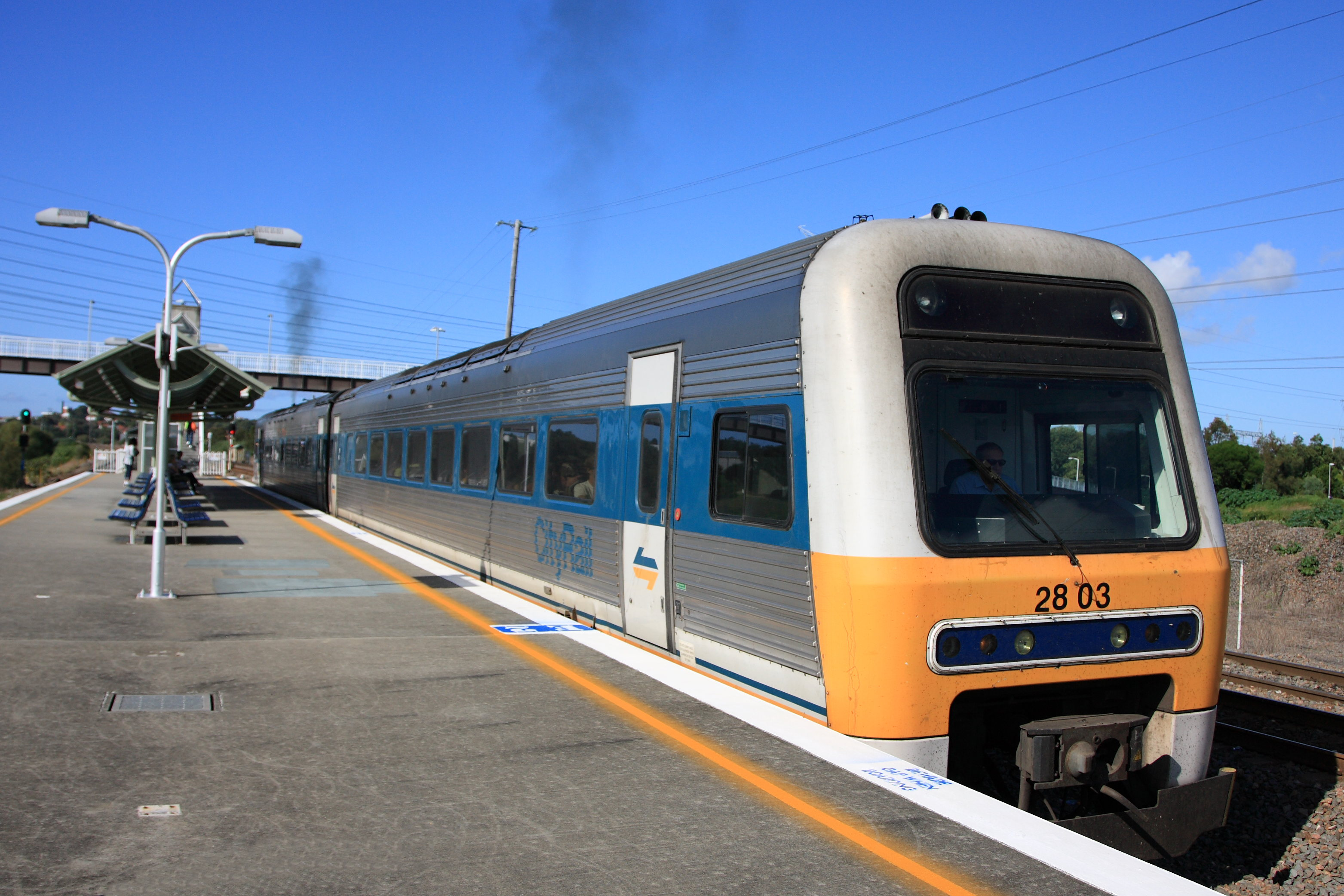
An Endeavour in original livery departing Warabrook in May 2007

Endeavours operate on four lines:

- Hunter: between Newcastle Interchange and Maitland or Telarah, with some services extending to Dungog and Scone
- Main Western: the Bathurst Bullet service, an express between Sydney Central and Bathurst
- Southern Highlands: between Campbelltown and Moss Vale, with some services extending to Goulburn and Sydney Central
- Illawarra: between Bomaderry and Kiama

Endeavours previously operated weekend only Wollongong to Moss Vale services.

=== Refurbishment ===
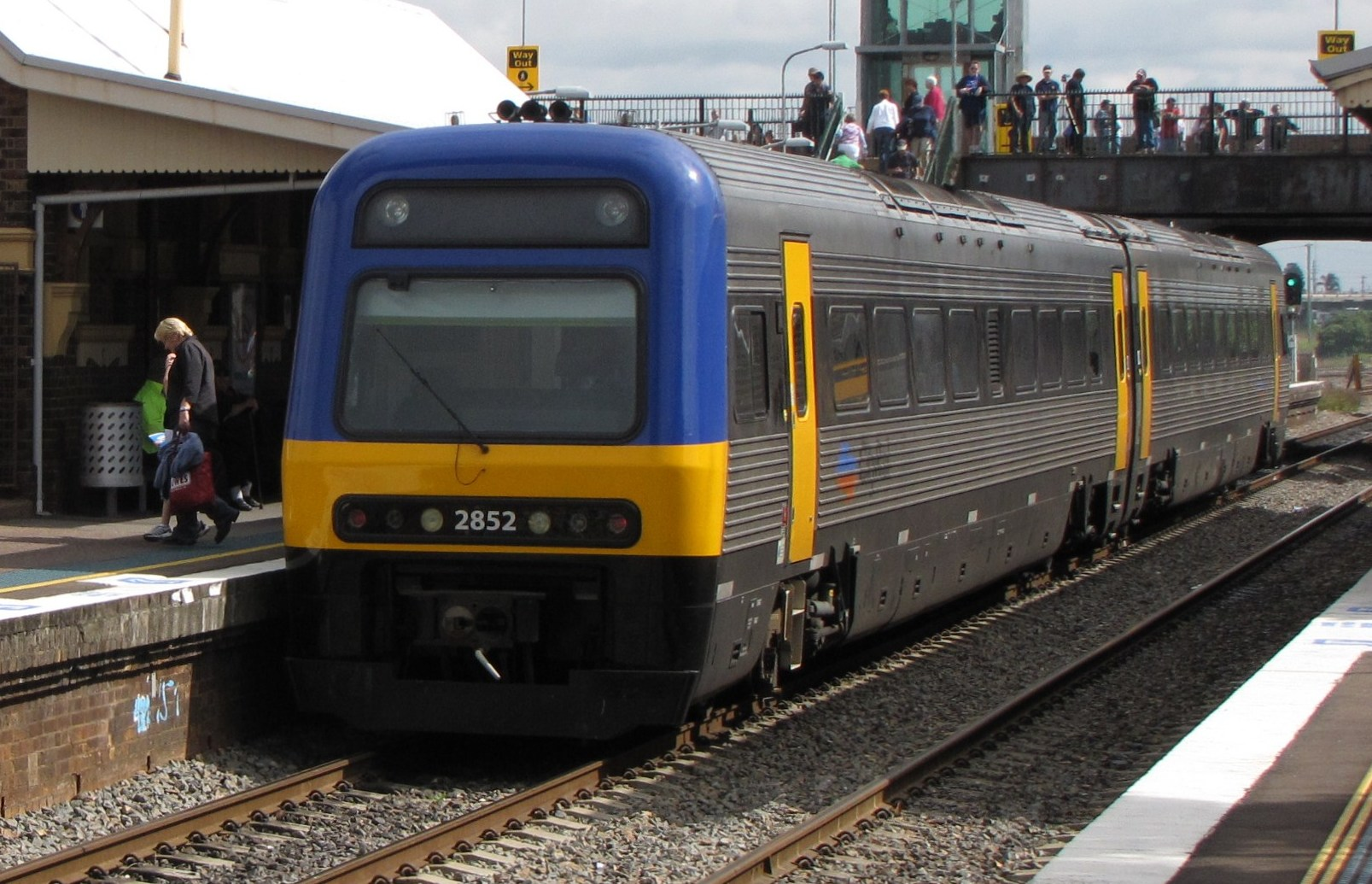
A CityRail refurbished Endeavour at Maitland station, 2009

In 2009–2010, the Endeavours, along with the Xplorers, were refurbished by Bombardier Transportation's Dandenong rolling stock factory. The refurbishment included:

- New reversible 3x2 seats, as found on the Hunter railcars and H sets, the seat covers are made of woollen moquette fabric which is more durable and vandal proof
- Vinyl flooring, replacing the original carpet flooring
- Voiceovers to closing the doors
- Improved air-conditioning system
- Improved crew facilities
- A new livery (blue and yellow front, black window band and underskirts, and yellow doors)

=== Second refurbishment ===
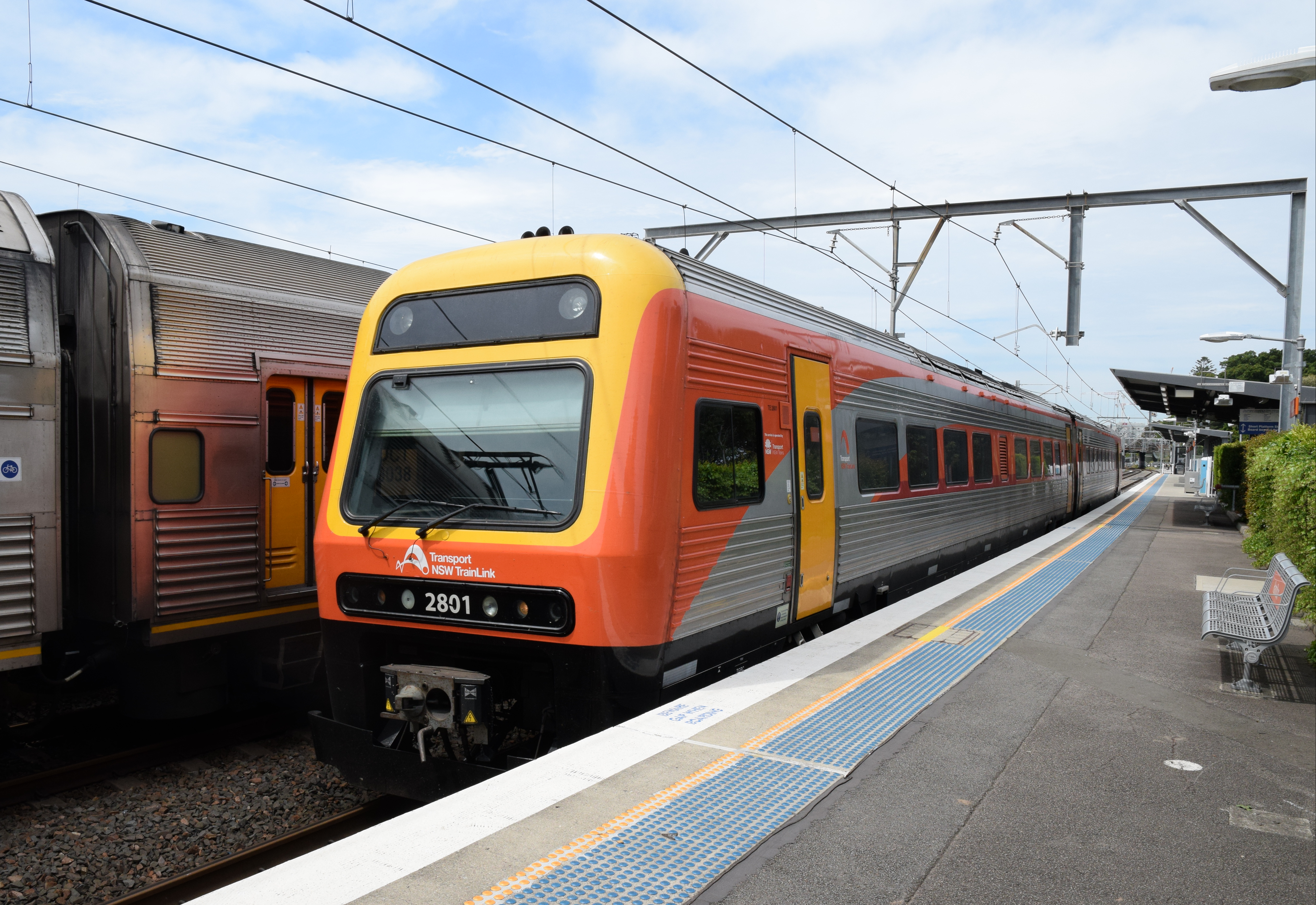
A NSW TrainLink refurbished Endeavour at Hamilton station, 2017

In 2017, the Endeavours were refurbished by Downer in Cardiff. The refurbishment includes:

- New lighting
- New flooring, similar to the Waratahs
- New livery to four cars, 2801, 2851, 2802 & 2852 (orange and yellow front, no window band and paint layout similar to the Xplorers.
- Refurbished seating
- New drivers window wipers
- Refurbished couplers (auto and intermediate)

=== Conversions to Xplorers ===
The similarities of the Endeavours and Xplorers have allowed easy conversions. Endeavour carriages LE 2865 and TE 2815 were converted to Xplorer carriages EA 2508 and EC 2528. Endeavour carriage TE 2805 was temporarily converted to an Xplorer carriage between September and November 2007. The CityRail logos were removed and its skirts painted black, but it otherwise retained its livery. It also retained its carriage number.

== See also ==
The VLocity DMU built for V/Line is an evolution of the Endeavour/Xplorer design.
