= New South Wales R set =

Regional train under testing in New South Wales, Australia

R set
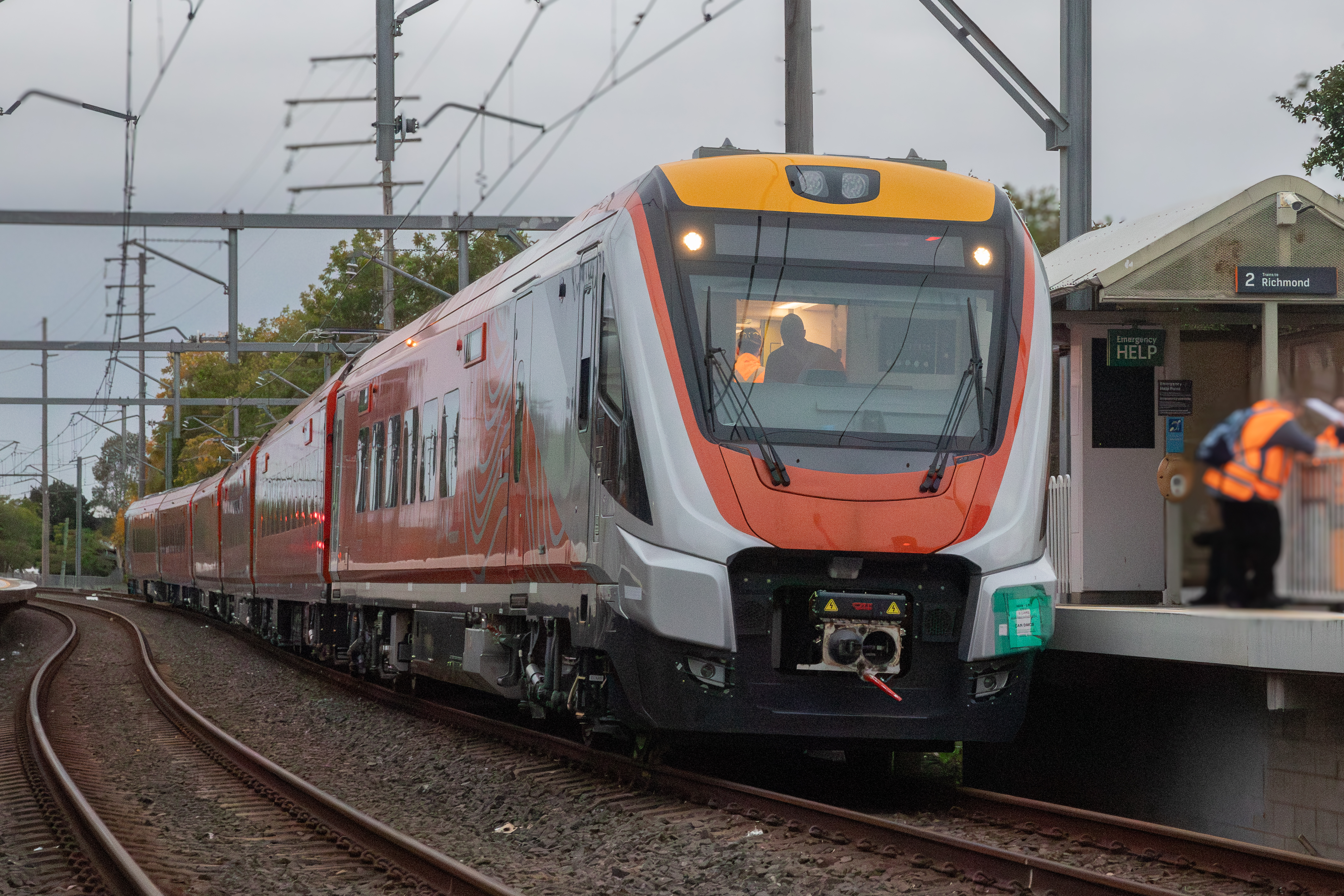
- R2 at Clarendon during testing, May 2025
- Stock type: Electro-diesel multiple unit
- Manufacturer: CAF
- Built at: Beasain, Spain
- Family name: Civity
- Replaced: XPT; Xplorer; Endeavour (excluding Hunter Line)
- Constructed: 2020–present
- Entered service: 2028–2029 (scheduled)
- Number under construction: 117 carriages (19 3-car sets and 10 6-car sets)
- Formation: 6-car Sets (Long Regional): RDA-RIA-RIB-RIC-RID-RDB; 3-car Sets (Short Regional): RDC-RIE-RDD; 3-car Sets (Intercity): RDE-RIF-RDF
- Fleet numbers: R1– (Regional)
- Operators: NSW TrainLink (Regional services); Sydney Trains (Intercity services)
- Depot: Mindyarra Maintenance Centre

Specifications
- Train length: 146.16 m (479 ft 6 5/16 in) (6-car sets); 73.92 m (242 ft 6 1/4 in) (3-car sets)
- Car length: 24.92 m (81 ft 9 1/8 in) (end cars); 24.08 m (79 ft 1/16 in) (intermediate cars)
- Width: 2.97 m (9 ft 8 15/16 in)
- Doors: Plug-style, 2 per side
- Wheel diameter: 850–780 mm (33–31 in)
- Maximum speed: Service (electric): 130 km/h (81 mph); Service (diesel): 160 km/h (100 mph); Design: 176 km/h (109 mph)
- Traction motors: 8–16 × TSA TME 46-23-4 210 kW (280 hp)
- Power output: 1,680–3,360 kW (2,250–4,510 hp)
- Electric systems: 1,500 V DC (NSW only)
- Current collection: Pantograph
- UIC classification: 2′Bo′+Bo′Bo′+Bo′2′(+2′Bo′+Bo′Bo′+Bo′2′)
- Track gauge: 1,435 mm (4 ft 8 1/2 in) standard gauge

The New South Wales R sets are a type of bi-mode multiple units (EDMUs) being built to replace NSW TrainLink's Xplorer and XPT fleets for long-distance services, as well as Sydney Trains' Endeavour fleet for diesel intercity services. The fleet is being built by CAF as part of their Civity family of trains. They were known as the Regional Rail Fleet (RRF) during procurement.

== History ==
In the lead up to the 2015 state election, the Baird Government committed itself, if re-elected, to replacing the XPT fleet (19 power cars and 60 carriages). Having been returned to office in October 2016, the government announced it was also considering replacing the Xplorer (23 carriages) and Endeavour (28 carriages) fleets.

In August 2017, the government announced it had decided to proceed with the replacement of all three fleets, as part of the Regional Rail Project. In November 2017 three consortia, led by Bombardier, Construcciones y Auxiliar de Ferrocarriles (CAF) and Downer, were shortlisted for the contract to build the trains. In May 2018, the Bombardier Consortium withdrew from the process.

A public–private partnership (PPP) contract was signed in February 2019 with Momentum Trains, a consortium of CAF, DIF Infrastructure and Pacific Partnerships. The order comprised 117 bi-mode Civity carriages which will form a total of 29 trains:

- 10 long (6-car) trainsets for use on long-distance Regional services (replacing the XPT fleet)
- 9 short (3-car) short-distance Regional trainsets (replacing the Xplorer fleet)
- 10 short (3-car) Intercity sets (replacing some of the Endeavour fleet)

They have a maximum speed of 160 kilometres per hour (99 mph), though they were described during the procurement process as “scalable” to 200 kilometres per hour (120 mph). All trains will be maintained at the purpose-built Mindyarra Maintenance Centre in Dubbo.

The first complete 6-car unit arrived at Port Kembla on 14 February 2024 and was taken by road to Dubbo. On 30 September 2024, the set was transferred by rail from Mindyarra Maintenance Centre to Auburn Maintenance Centre in Auburn to prepare for mainline traction testing. In February 2025, the same set commenced mainline testing on the Northern Line between West Ryde and Epping, the Western Line between St Marys and Blacktown, and on the Richmond Line between Richmond and Riverstone.

By October 2025, the PPP contract had been dissolved by the NSW government, citing "negotiations to resolve commercial challenges, avoid further project delays and secure the best outcome for the people of NSW". Transport for NSW would work directly with the delivery partners, with CAF continuing as the train manufacturer, and UGL continuing to maintain the trains at Mindyarra.

The fleet is planned to enter service in 2028.

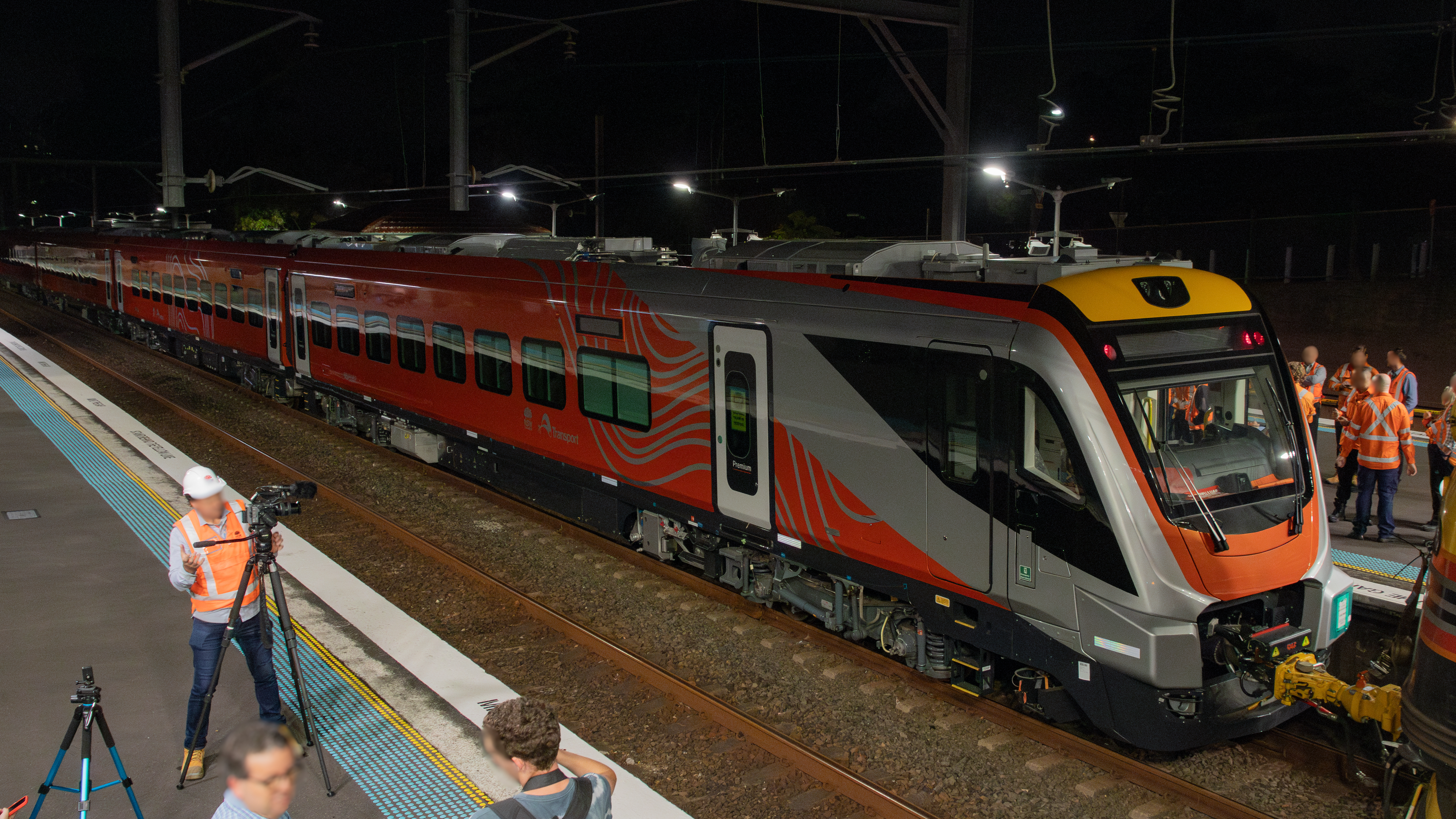
LR2 at Denistone station on the first night of testing, 25 February 2025

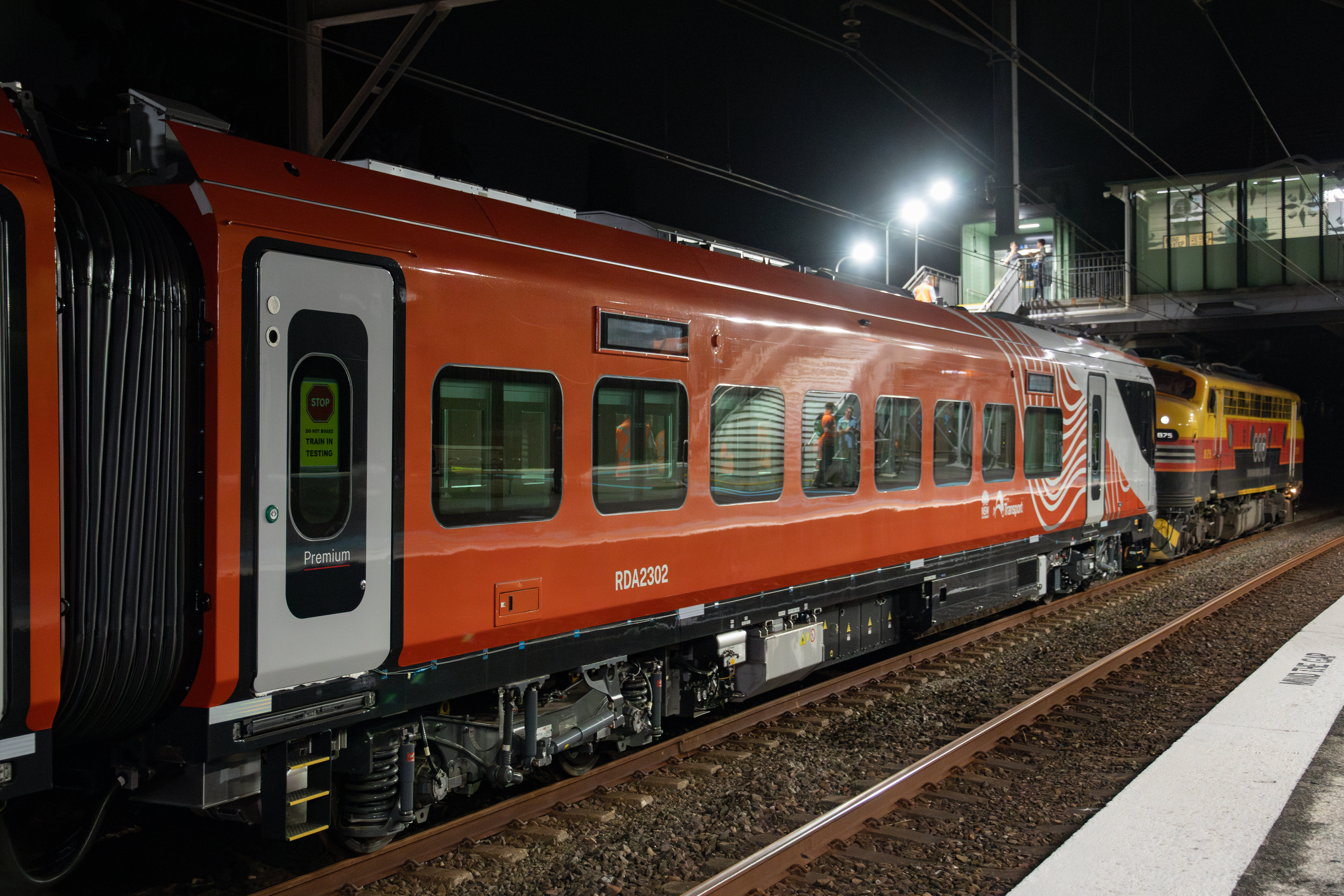
RDA2302 at Denistone, February 2025

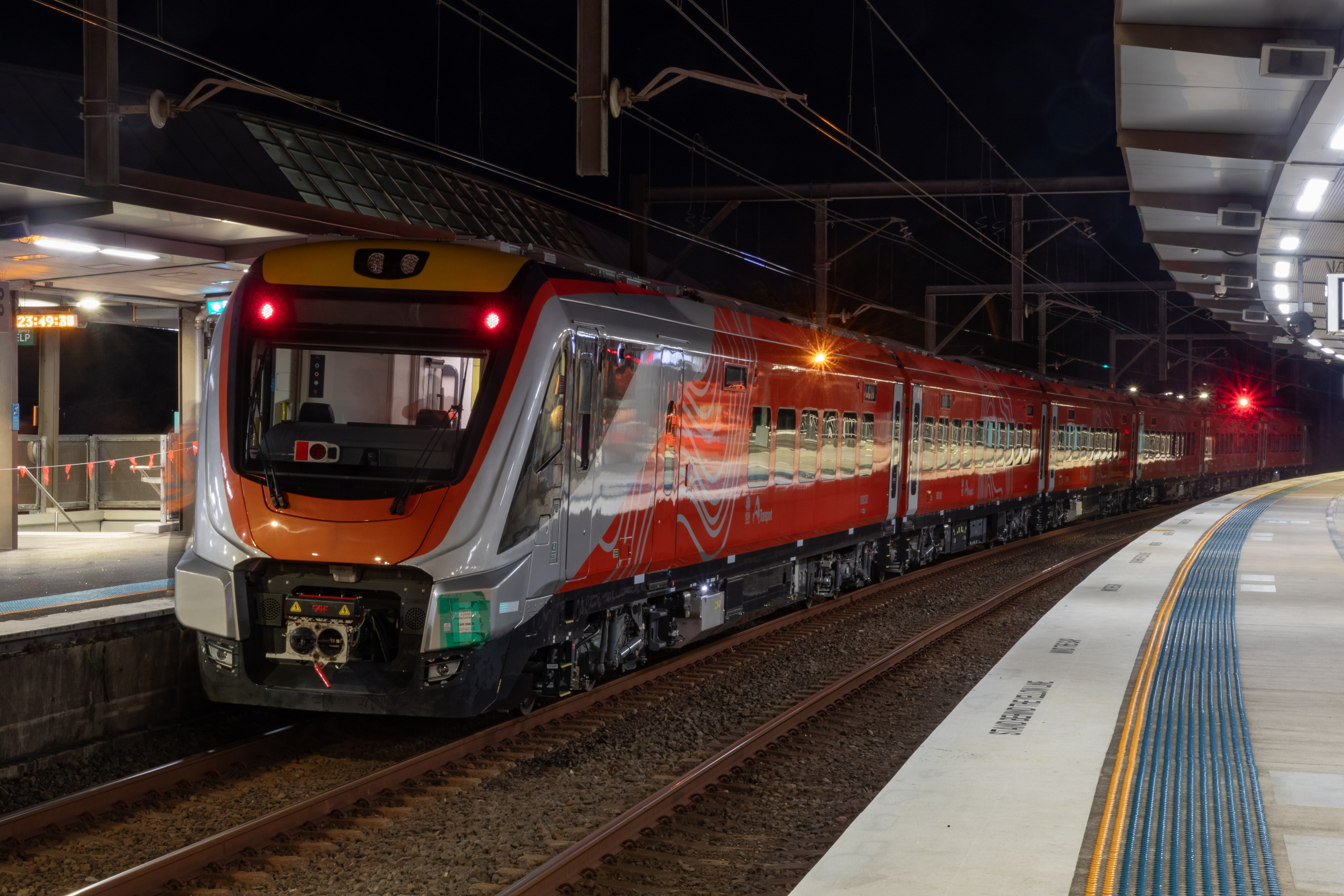
R2 at Eastwood during testing, March 2025

The new fleet has been criticised for its lack of sleeper carriages, which are available on the XPT.
