= Bathurst station =

Bathurst station or Bathurst railway station may refer to:

- Bathurst station (New Brunswick), a railway station in Bathurst, New Brunswick, Canada
- Bathurst station (Toronto), a subway station in Toronto, Canada
- Bathurst Station, Ontario, a community in Tay Valley, Ontario, Canada
- Bathurst railway station, New South Wales, a railway station in Bathurst, New South Wales, Australia
