= Tarana railway station =

Railway station in New South Wales, Australia

Tarana
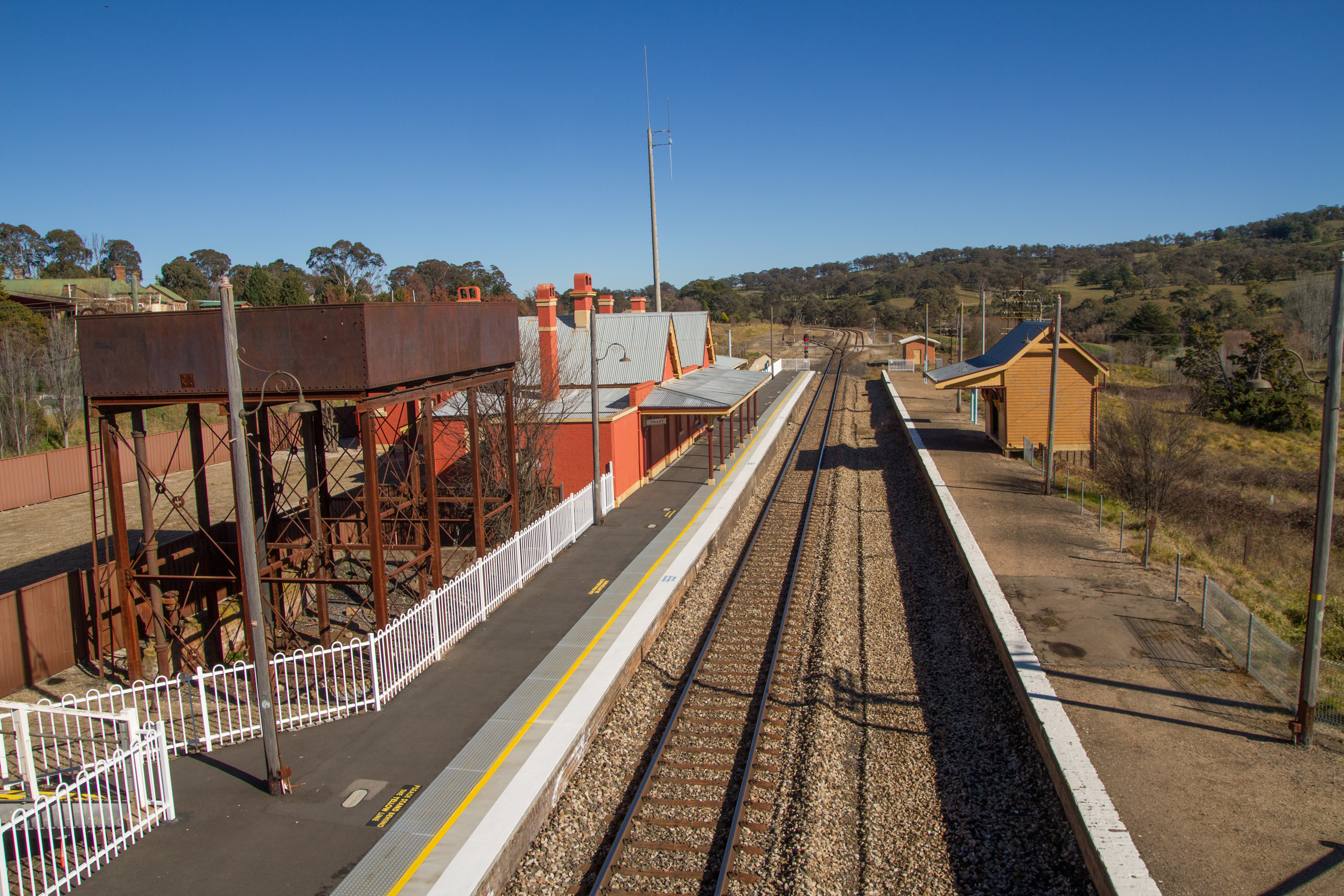
- Westbound view of the station platforms, July 2014

General information
- Location: Mutton Falls Road, Tarana; Australia
- Coordinates: 33°31′27″S 149°54′27″E
- Owner: Transport Asset Manager of New South Wales
- Operator: Sydney Trains
- Line: Main Western line
- Distance: 198.3 km (123.2 mi) from Central
- Platforms: 2 side (1 disused)
- Tracks: 1

Construction
- Structure type: Ground
- Accessible: Yes

Other information
- Station code: TNJ

History
- Opened: 22 April 1872

Passengers
- 2023: >840 (year)

Services
Preceding station	Intercity Trains	Following station
Bathurst Terminus	Blue Mountains Line (4 daily services) Bathurst Bullet	Rydal towards Central
Preceding station	NSW TrainLink	Following station
Bathurst towards Dubbo	NSW TrainLink Western Line Dubbo XPT	Rydal towards Sydney
Former services
Preceding station	Former services	Following station
Tarana Quarry towards Bourke	Main Western Line	Sodwalls towards Sydney
Carlwood towards Oberon	Oberon Line (1923–1973)	Terminus
Oberon Terminus	Oberon Line (1973–1980)	Terminus
Location

Tarana railway station is a heritage-listed railway station located on the Main Western line in Tarana, in the Central West region of New South Wales, Australia. It is also known as the Tarana Railway Station and yard group. The property was added to the New South Wales State Heritage Register on 2 April 1999.

It opened on 22 August 1872. The track was lifted from the northern platform in 1996 when the section of the Main Western line between Wallerawang and Tarana was singled.

It was the junction for the Oberon line that closed in 1979. The Oberon Tarana Heritage Railway group has a vision to restore the line from Oberon to Tarana.

== Description ==
The railway station complex comprises:

- Station buildings
  - station/residence – type 1, brick with extensions, 1872
  - type 11, brick, 1915
- Signal box – type 3, timber, skillion roof, 1916
- Platform faces – brick
- Dock platform
- Pedestrian bridge, steel, c. 1916
- Jib crane
- Water tank – type 1 cast-iron, up platform, c. 1906
- Station lighting and signs

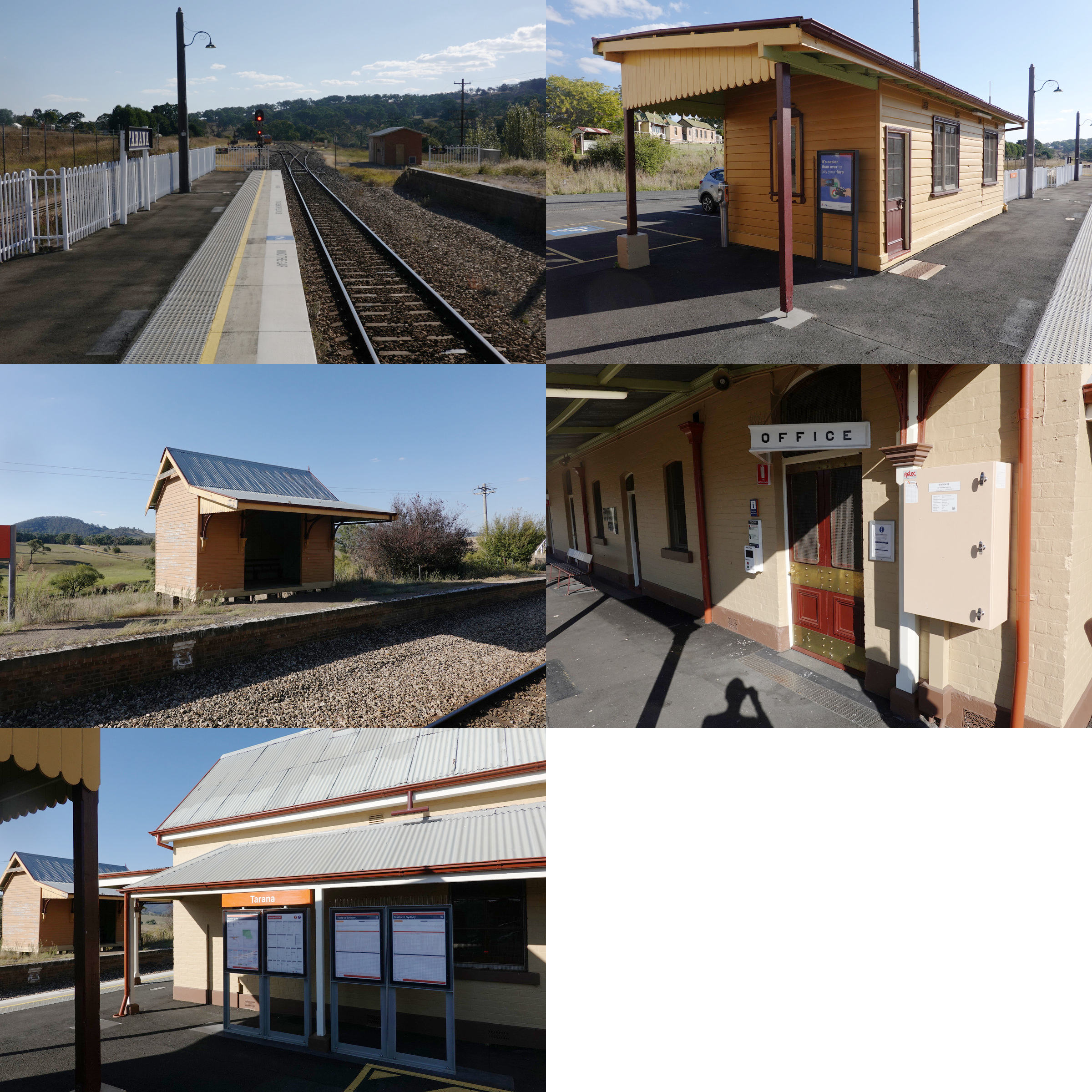
Some shots of Tarana railway station in New South Wales in April 2025

== Services ==
Tarana is served by NSW TrainLink's daily Central West XPT service operating between Sydney and Dubbo. The XPT only stops here on request if passengers have booked to board/alight here. From 16 September 2019 the 4 times daily Bathurst Bullet also stops here.

Platform	Line	Stopping pattern	Notes
1	BMT	2 morning services to Sydney Central; 2 evening services to Lithgow; 4 services daily to Bathurst	
1	Western Region	Services to Sydney Central and Dubbo	request stop (booked passengers only)
2	Not in use		

- From 1 June 2020, bus route 598 operates a Monday to Friday morning bus service from Oberon connecting with the second Bathurst Bullet train to Sydney Central. In the afternoon the service to Oberon connects with the first Bathurst Bullet from Sydney.

== Heritage listing ==
As at 9 January 2008, the structures form a large group indicating the form of the site following duplication during 1916. It is largely intact, the only significant element missing being the goods shed. It contains a fine example of a station/residence in combination with a range of interesting supportive structures. The station group forms one of the best station complexes surviving from the early period of railway construction.

Tarana railway station was listed on the New South Wales State Heritage Register on 2 April 1999 having satisfied the following criteria.

The place possesses uncommon, rare or endangered aspects of the cultural or natural history of New South Wales.

This item is assessed as historically rare. This item is assessed as arch. rare. This item is assessed as socially rare.

== See also ==
- List of regional railway stations in New South Wales
