= Mindyarra Maintenance Centre =

Railway depot in Dubbo, Australia

Location
- Location: Dubbo, Australia

Characteristics
- Owner: Transport Asset Manager of New South Wales
- Operator: UGL Rail
- Roads: 6
- Rolling stock: R set

History
- Opened: 2025

The Mindyarra Maintenance Centre is a railway depot in Dubbo, Australia, built as part of the NSW TrainLink Regional Train Project.

== History ==
In August 2017, as part of the NSW TrainLink Regional Train Project, Transport for NSW announced a new maintenance facility would be built in Dubbo, adjacent to the Main Western railway line, 700 metres to the east of Dubbo railway station. In November 2020, CPB Contractors commenced construction. Work was completed in 2025.

Mindyarra is a Wiradjuri word that means "fix" or "repair". It is the first Transport for NSW facility to use an Aboriginal name.
