= Locksley, New South Wales =

Locksley
- Town
- Coordinates: 33°28′45″S 149°42′56″E
- Country: Australia
- State: New South Wales
- LGA: Bathurst Region
- Location: 174 km (108 mi) WNW of Sydney; 55 km (34 mi) W of Lithgow; 28 km (17 mi) ESE of Bathurst

Government
  - State electorate: Bathurst
  - Federal division: Calare
- Elevation: 752 m (2,467 ft)

Population
  - Total: 55 (SAL 2021)
- Postcode: 2795
Localities around Locksley
Wambool	Yetholme	Yetholme
Wambool	Locksley	Gemalla
O'Connell	O'Connell	Gemalla

Locksley is a locality in the central tablelands region of New South Wales Australia, previously called Dirty Swamp. It is located on the Main Western railway line. A now-closed railway station opened in 1872.

== History ==
The Dirty Swamp railway station was located nineteen miles beyond Rydal and was opened for passenger traffic on 22 April 1872. At that stage it was the end of the line, but it was expected the line would be extended through to Kelso “in the course of a few months”. The Rydal to Dirty Swamp line was constructed under contract by Messrs. Blunt and Williams.

The name of the Dirty Swamp Post Office was changed to Locksley Post Office from 15 February 1880.

Preceding station	Former services	Following station
Wambool towards Bourke	Main Western Line	Gemalla towards Sydney
