= Oberon Tarana Heritage Railway =

Heritage railway society in New South Wales, Australia

OTHR Inc
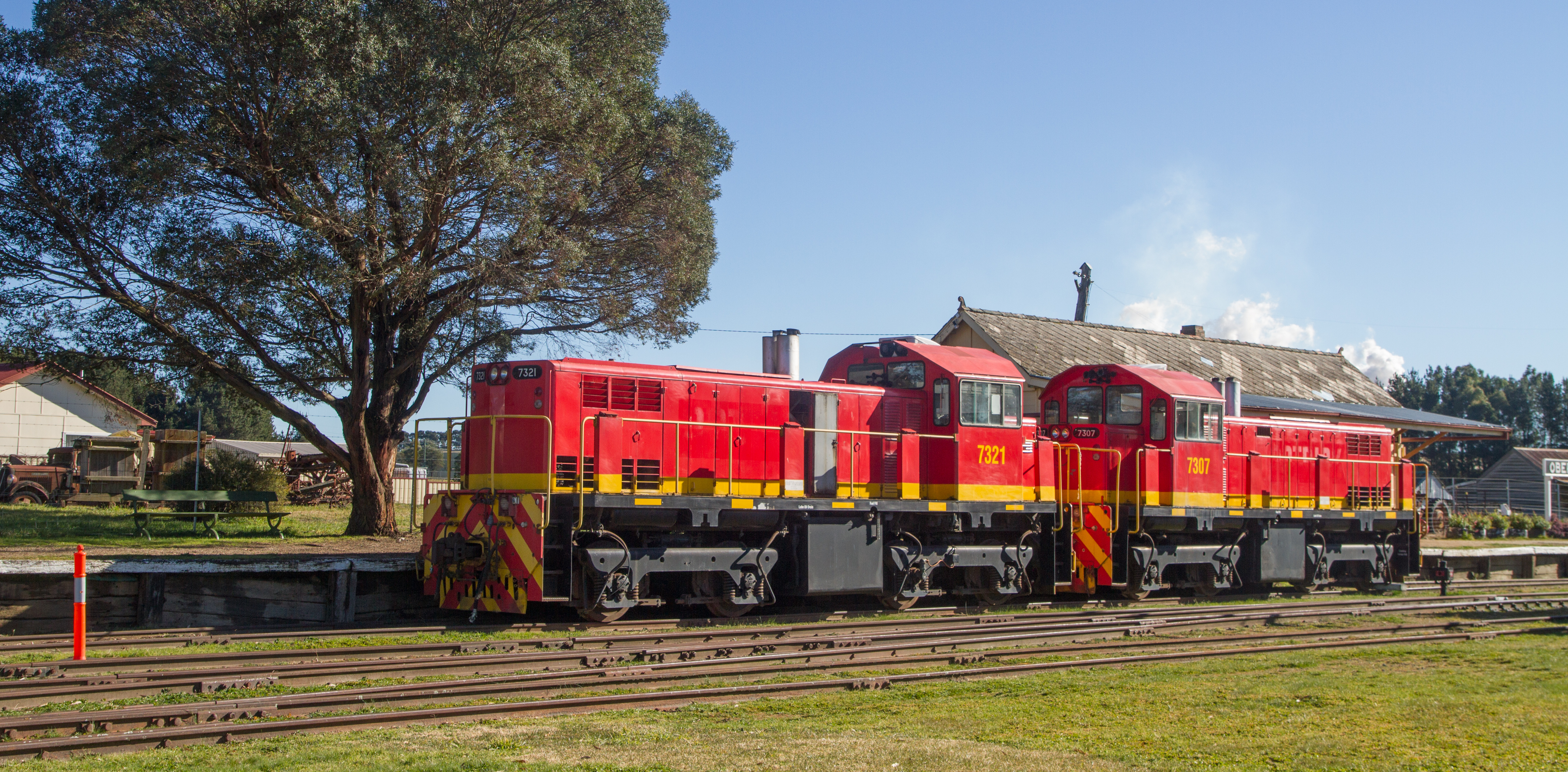
- The Railway's diesel engines 7321 and 7307 at Oberon station
- Locale: NSW AU
- Terminus: Oberon
- Coordinates: 33.7001°S 149.8539°E

Commercial operations
- Built by: New South Wales Government Railways
- Original gauge: 4 ft 8 1/2 in (1,435 mm) standard gauge

Preserved operations
- Owned by: Transport Asset Holding Entity
- Stations: 4
- Length: 24 km (15 mi)
- Preserved gauge: 4 ft 8 1/2 in (1,435 mm) standard gauge

Website
- www.othr.com.au

The Oberon Tarana Heritage Railway inc (OTHR) is a volunteer association aiming to reopen the Oberon to Tarana railway line in the Central Tablelands of New South Wales, Australia, and run heritage trains.

== The line ==
The Oberon railway line is a 24-kilometre (15 mi) disused branch railway, which junctions with the Main Western line at Tarana and heads in a southerly direction to the town of Oberon. Opened on 3 October 1923, the line was lightly constructed, and included steep grades (1 in 25 or 4 %) and tight curves. It was operated by lightweight locomotives, mainly 19 class steam locomotives, and then 49 class diesels. It transported local seasonal vegetables, timber and livestock. Passenger services ceased in 1971, and freight services in 1979, with the line effectively closing then.

=== Restoration ===
The restoration of the line is being undertaken in three stages, per the Railway's 15-year plan from 2020 to 2035:

- Stage 1: Oberon to Hazelgrove
- Stage 2: Hazelgrove to Carlwood
- Stage 3: Carlwood to Tarana

== Rolling stock ==
In May 2010, end platform carriages CBA850 and HLF854 were acquired on loan from the New South Wales Rail Transport Museum, as well as railmotor CPH13 from the Canberra Railway Museum. In May 2010, locomotives 7307 and 7321 were purchased from Patrick Portlink.
