= Tumulla railway station =

Former railway station in New South Wales, Australia

Coordinates: 33°30′00″S 149°32′00″E

Tumulla was a crossing loop part way up the steep Tumulla Bank on the Main Western railway line in New South Wales, Australia.

== Overview ==
The loop opened in 1910, and was signalled for Up and Down Working. The loop was about 400m long.

Because of the steep grades, there was a safety siding at the down hill end of the up loop in case of runaways. There was also a catchpoint at the down hill end of the down loop.

The loop was closed around 1990.

== Adjacent stations ==
- Georges Plains
- Wimbledon

== See also ==
- Railway stations in New South Wales
- Passing loop
