= Oberon railway line =

Railway line in New South Wales, Australia

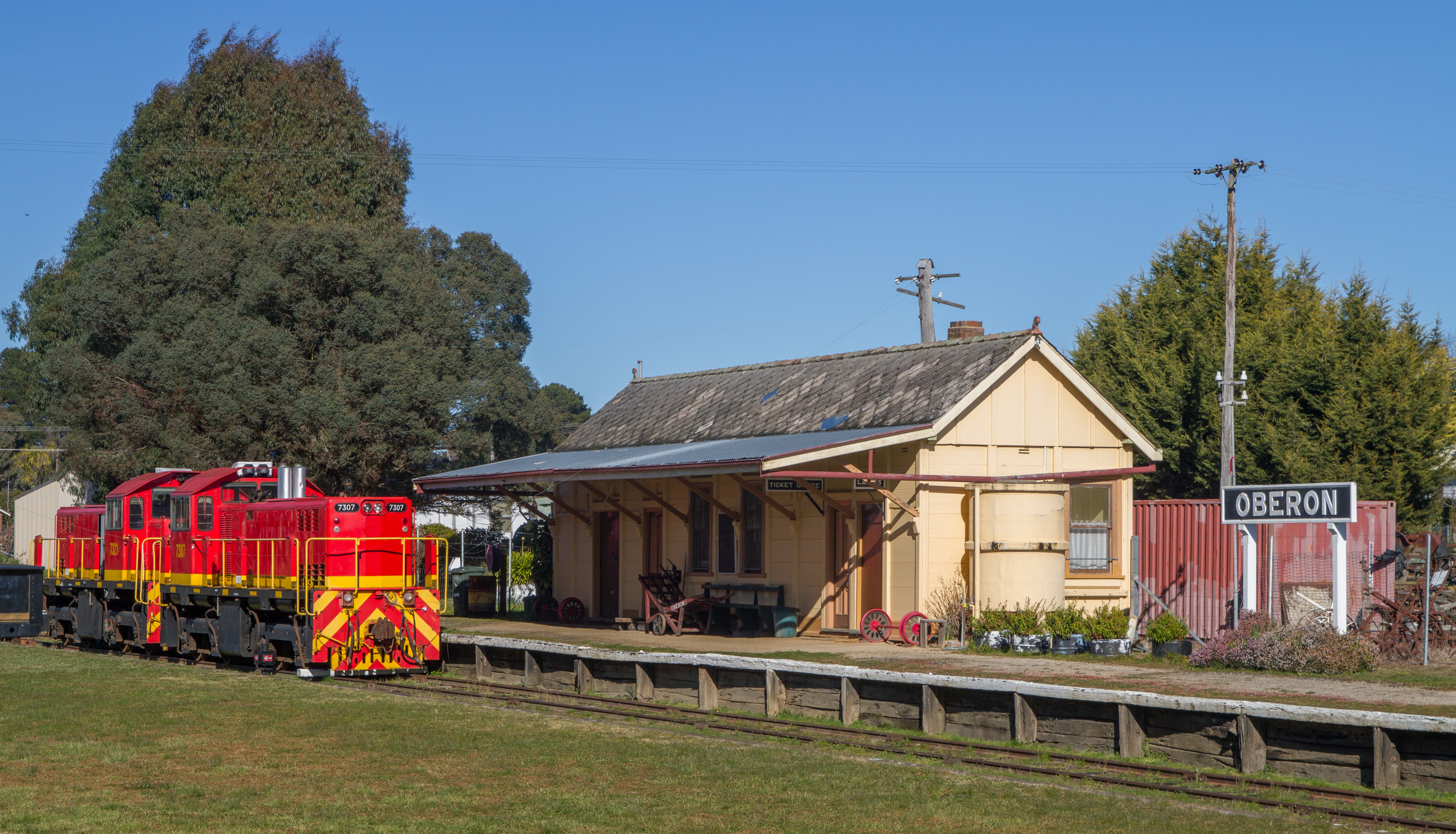
- Oberon railway station

Overview
- Other name: Oberon branch
- Termini: Tarana; Oberon
- Stations: 4

History
- Opened: 3 October 1923
- Closed: 1979

Technical
- Line length: 15 miles 7 chains (24.3 km)
- Number of tracks: 1
- Track gauge: 4 ft 8 1/2 in (1,435 mm)
- Minimum radius: 5 chains (330 ft; 100 m)
- Highest elevation: 1,106 m (3,629 ft)
- Maximum incline: 4%

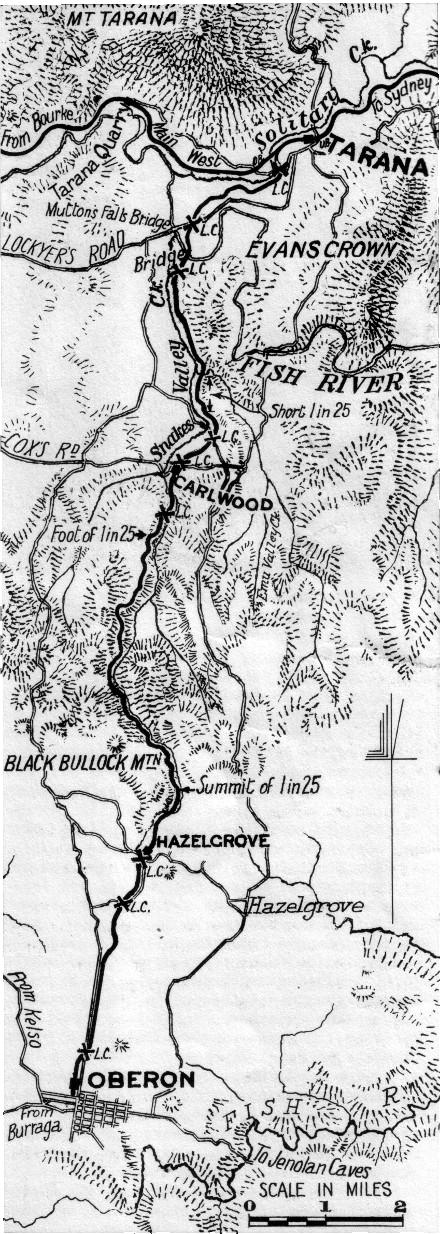

The Oberon railway line is a short branch railway line in the Central Tablelands of New South Wales, Australia. The line branches from the Main Western line at Tarana railway station and heads in a southerly direction to Oberon railway station, with length of 24 km.

Since 2007, the Oberon Tarana Heritage Railway Inc (OTHR) have been steadily restoring track on the line.

== History ==
It was earlier put forward as a line from Tarana to Burraga, via Oberon, to benefit the Burraga copper mine. It opened on 3 October 1923, after the copper mine at Burraga had closed down. The line was lightly constructed with steep grades (1 in 25) and tight curves, and was operated by lightweight steam and then diesel locomotives. It transported local seasonal vegetables, timber, livestock, and other goods. Passenger services ended in 1971, and goods services were suspended in 1979; the line was never formally closed. The line is currently being restored by a volunteer association to allow heritage and tourist operation.

== See also ==
- Rail transport in New South Wales
