= Bathurst railway station, New South Wales =

Railway station in New South Wales, Australia

Bathurst
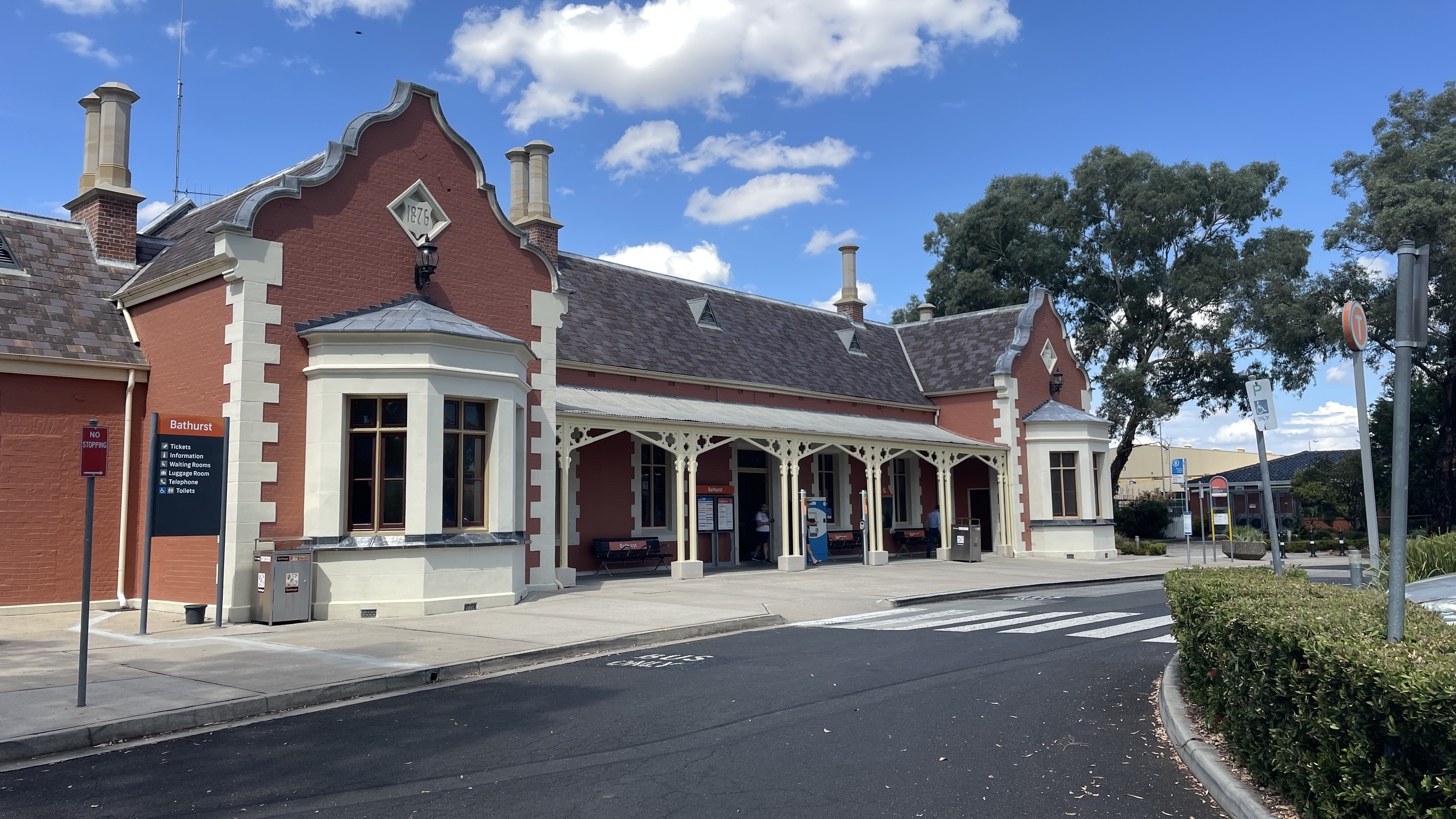
- Station building and entrance, March 2025

General information
- Location: Keppel Street, Bathurst; Australia
- Coordinates: 33°25′32″S 149°35′00″E
- Owner: Transport Asset Manager of New South Wales
- Operator: Sydney Trains
- Line: Main Western
- Distance: 228.70 km (142.11 mi) from Sydney Central
- Platforms: 2 side (1 disused)
- Tracks: 2
- Connections: Bus; Coach

Construction
- Structure type: Ground
- Accessible: Yes

Other information
- Station code: BHS
- Website: Transport for NSW

History
- Opened: 4 April 1876

Passengers
- 2023: 44,730 (year); 123 (daily) (Sydney Trains, NSW TrainLink)

Services
Preceding station	Intercity Trains	Following station
Terminus	Blue Mountains Line (4 daily services) Bathurst Bullet	Tarana towards Central
Preceding station	NSW TrainLink	Following station
Blayney towards Dubbo	NSW TrainLink Western Line Dubbo XPT	Tarana towards Sydney
Blayney towards Broken Hill	NSW TrainLink Western Line Broken Hill Outback Xplorer	Lithgow towards Sydney
Location

Bathurst railway station is a heritage-listed railway station located on Havannah Street, Bathurst, New South Wales, Australia. It is situated on the Main Western line and is the only railway station serving the city. The station was added to the New South Wales State Heritage Register on 2 April 1999.

== History ==
Bathurst station opened on 4 April 1876 when the Great Western Railway (now the Main Western line) was extended from Kelso. It was opened by the Governor of New South Wales, Hercules Robinson. The station building, goods shed, divisional engineer's office were all completed in 1876; the grand station-master's residence was completed c.1880. The station served as the terminus of the line until extended to Blayney on 1 November 1876.

Bathurst had already been established as a major centre based on large pastoral holdings and the 1850s gold rush which boosted the population of the town. Much of the civic building in Bathurst took place following the gold rush. Proposals for the first railways in NSW were largely driven by the interests of large land holders seeking improved transport for their wool from the inland centres of Bathurst, Goulburn, Muswellbrook and Singleton. The town received a sustainable boost in activity and development from the arrival of the railway which allowed the town to communicate and trade quickly and cheaply with Sydney.

Other early buildings included the Stores office (c. 1876), coal stage (relocated from Raglan) in 1877), a new coal stage (1878), blacksmith's shop (1878–1879), turntable (relocated from Rydal in 1879), depot (1879), engine shed (1881) and the West signal box (1885).

Bathurst was developed into a major railway centre with a locomotive depot established to the south of the station in 1879 with accommodation for eight locomotives. By 1917, Bathurst depot had a locomotive allocation of 72. As well as working on the Main Western and Blayney–Demondrille lines, it provided bank engines for Tumulla Bank.

The workshops, established during the 1880s, started a large railway workers' community and a rail institute to educate the hundreds of workers at Bathurst. In 1903, Ben Chifley, who would become Prime Minister of Australia in July 1945, joined the New South Wales Government Railways at Bathurst as a shop boy and in March 1912 was promoted to become a driver, becoming the youngest First Class locomotive driver. Chifley remained based at Bathurst depot until resigning in November 1928 to become the Federal Member for Macquarie. In the early years of the 20th century, Chifley attended night school and extension classes at the institute. The union meetings Chifley attended at the Institute helped to shape his trade union and Labour politics. Chifley was also one of the founders of the AFULE (the Australian Federated Union of Locomotive Enginemen).

Numerous changes and additions were made to the site in the late 19th century and 20th century, examples of which include the original stockyards (c. 1900), a wagon repair shed (1891), a new turntable (1897), platform lengthened (1897), waiting shed erected on the Down platform (1902), Down platform extended and widened (1911), line duplicated (1915) elevated coal storage (1916), refreshment room (1917), new T6 trucking yards (1927), and an additional signal box in 1944.

The post-war period (between 1945 and 1960) saw as many as 500 staff working at Bathurst station and yard at its peak. However, by the 1970s, changes in freight transportation and the move to diesel services resulted in the redundancy of many buildings and former functions on site and the rationalisation of many structures.

The refreshment room closed in 1968 and The Railway Institute in 1975. While many former buildings remain unoccupied, the former District Engineer's office is now used by the Bathurst Community College and the Station Master's residence is occupied by a private tenant.

With dieselisation and reduced maintenance needs, Bathurst depot closed on 23 January 1981 with all work transferred to Lithgow.

However Bathurst would remain an important railway centre, with Clyde Engineering, opening a facility in the eastern Bathurst suburb of Kelso in the 1970s. It would build 84 81 class and 15 DL class locomotives in the 1980s as well as overhaul locomotives. It closed in April 2014.

== Services ==
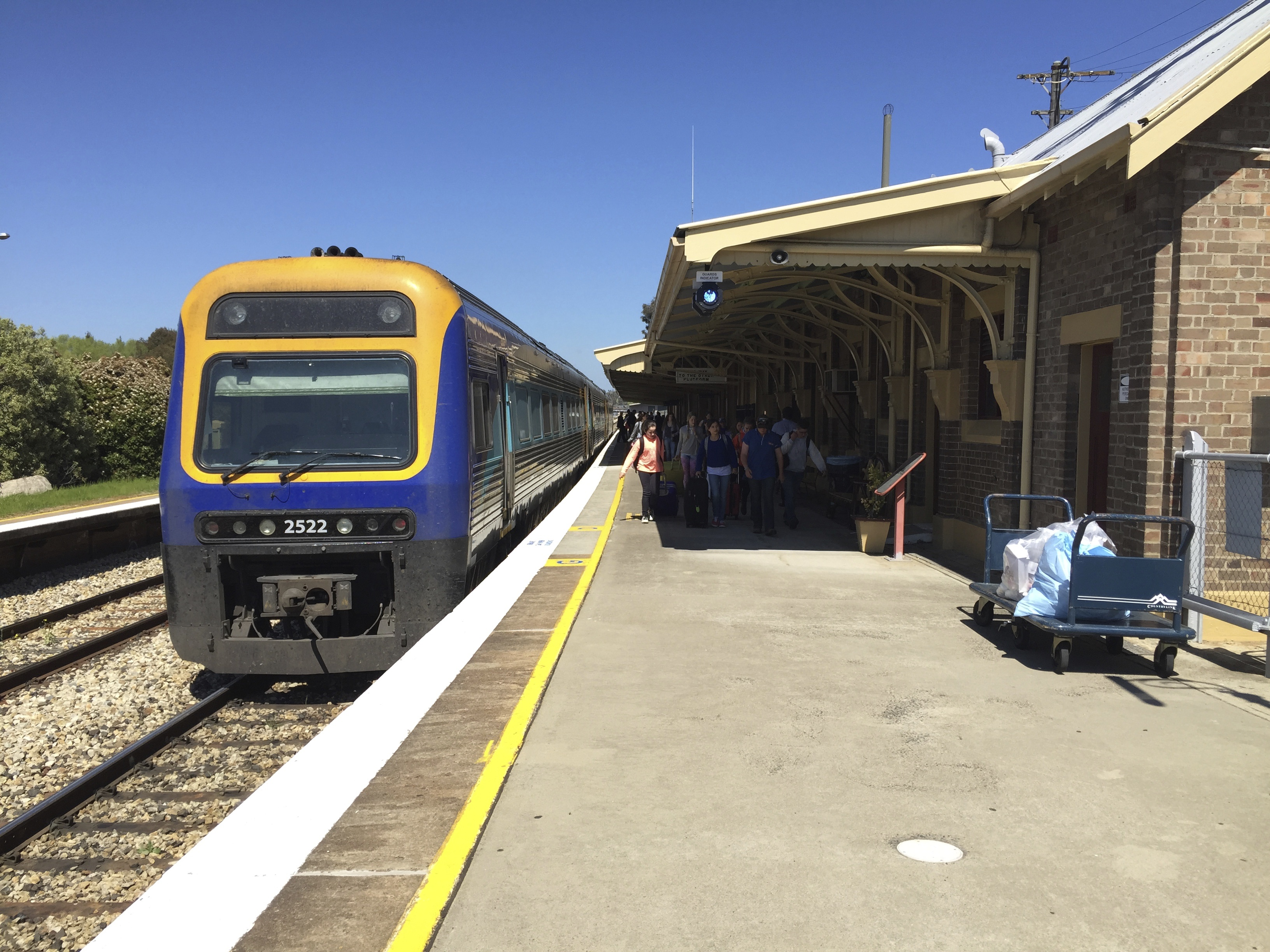
Outback Xplorer train at Bathurst Station

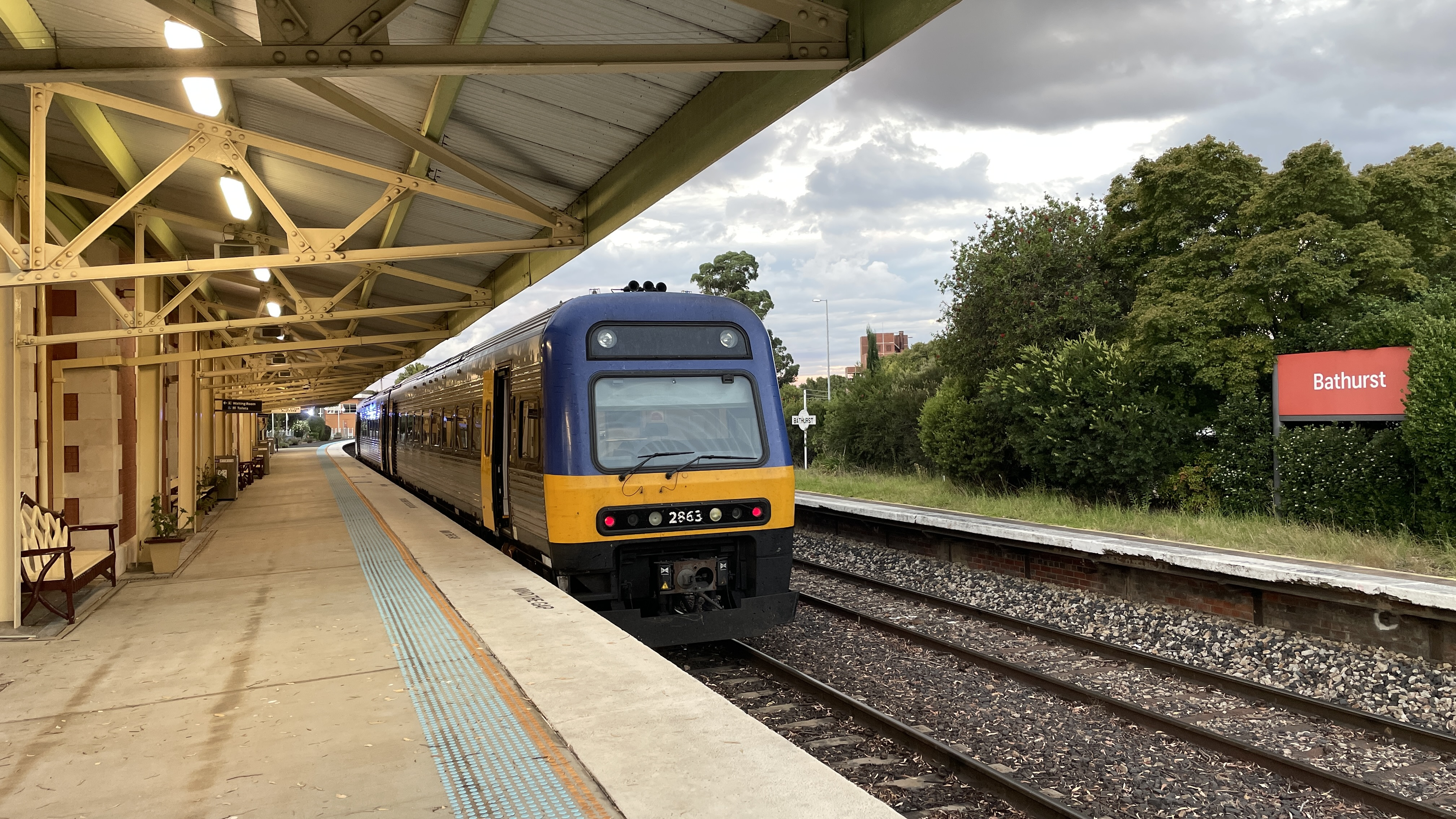
Bathurst Bullet train at Bathurst Station

Bathurst is served by Sydney Trains 4 daily Bathurst Bullet services to Sydney & Lithgow, the daily Central West XPT service operating between Sydney and Dubbo and the weekly Outback Xplorer between Sydney and Broken Hill.

Journey Beyond's weekly Indian Pacific passes through Bathurst but does not stop.

NSW TrainLink's road coach services operating between Lithgow, Orange, Grenfell, Parkes, Dubbo, Nyngan and Cootamundra also serve the station.

Platform	Line	Stopping pattern	Notes
1	BMT	2 morning services to Sydney Central; 2 evening services to Lithgow	
1	Western Region	Services to Sydney Central, Broken Hill and Dubbo	
2	Not in use		

== Transport links ==
Bathurst Buslines routes 522 524 and 526 operate via Bathurst station.

Lithgow Buslines operate route 636 from Bathurst station to Lithgow.

== Description ==
The station has two side platforms but only the northern side platform is in operation.

=== Station building (1876) ===
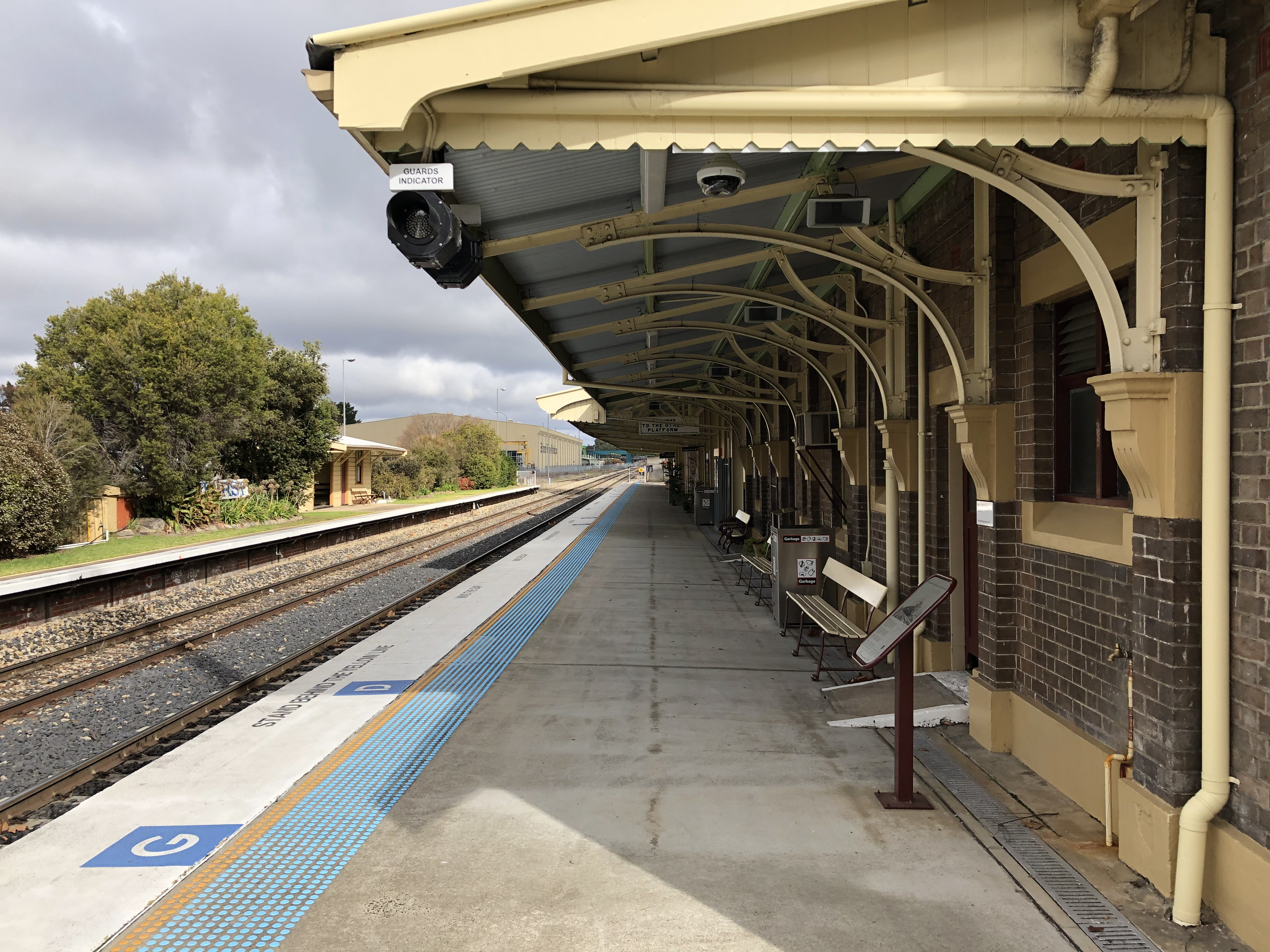
The station platform in 2022, looking south.

The main building is an outstanding example of a first-class station building. The single-storey rendered-brick building is Victorian Tudor in style with two gabled wings projecting forward towards the forecourt with stuccoed quoins and a facetted bay window. The gabled bays feature curvilinear-shaped parapets with the 1876 construction date prominently displayed on each of the gables, on top of which is a finial. The roof is clad in slate with gablet vents and octagonal coupled chimneys.

The original building, now extended, was symmetrical with a verandah to the street side supported on paired decorative timber columns and prominent decorative brackets The central section of the building, between the wings, has stuccoed window and door surrounds. The platform side has been altered with the addition of a new awning on cantilevered brackets, built at the time of the northern extension to the building for refreshment rooms and luggage. The main station building is on the axis of one of the major roads in Bathurst and is a key visual element in the city.

=== Waiting shed (1914) ===
The waiting shed on the Down platform dates from 1916 and is a simple weatherboard shed, in juxtaposition to the grand building on the other platform.

=== Station master's residence (1880) ===
This is a grand two-storey Gothic Revival style brick residence with a projecting gabled front bay with bay window to the ground floor surmounted with a false decorative plaster balustrade. The building is constructed from the typical red brick used throughout Bathurst. The building has rendered quoins, fretted barge boards and rendered detail around windows and doors. The verandah is supported on cast-iron columns and brackets and has a bel cast roof. It is one of the best surviving station master's residences in the state.

=== Stores Branch Office – Keppel and Havannah Sts ===
This is a small building now used for offices with a central doorway and 4 rooms. The building is timber with a corrugated iron roof and a return verandah on the Havannah St side, with good joinery details.

=== Subway ===
The brick subway linking platforms 1 and 2 is no longer in use. It features a disused stair leading to the brick vaulted subway which passes under the tracks and a portion of the platform. Possibly constructed/ extended with line duplication in 1915.

=== Other heritage-listed items ===
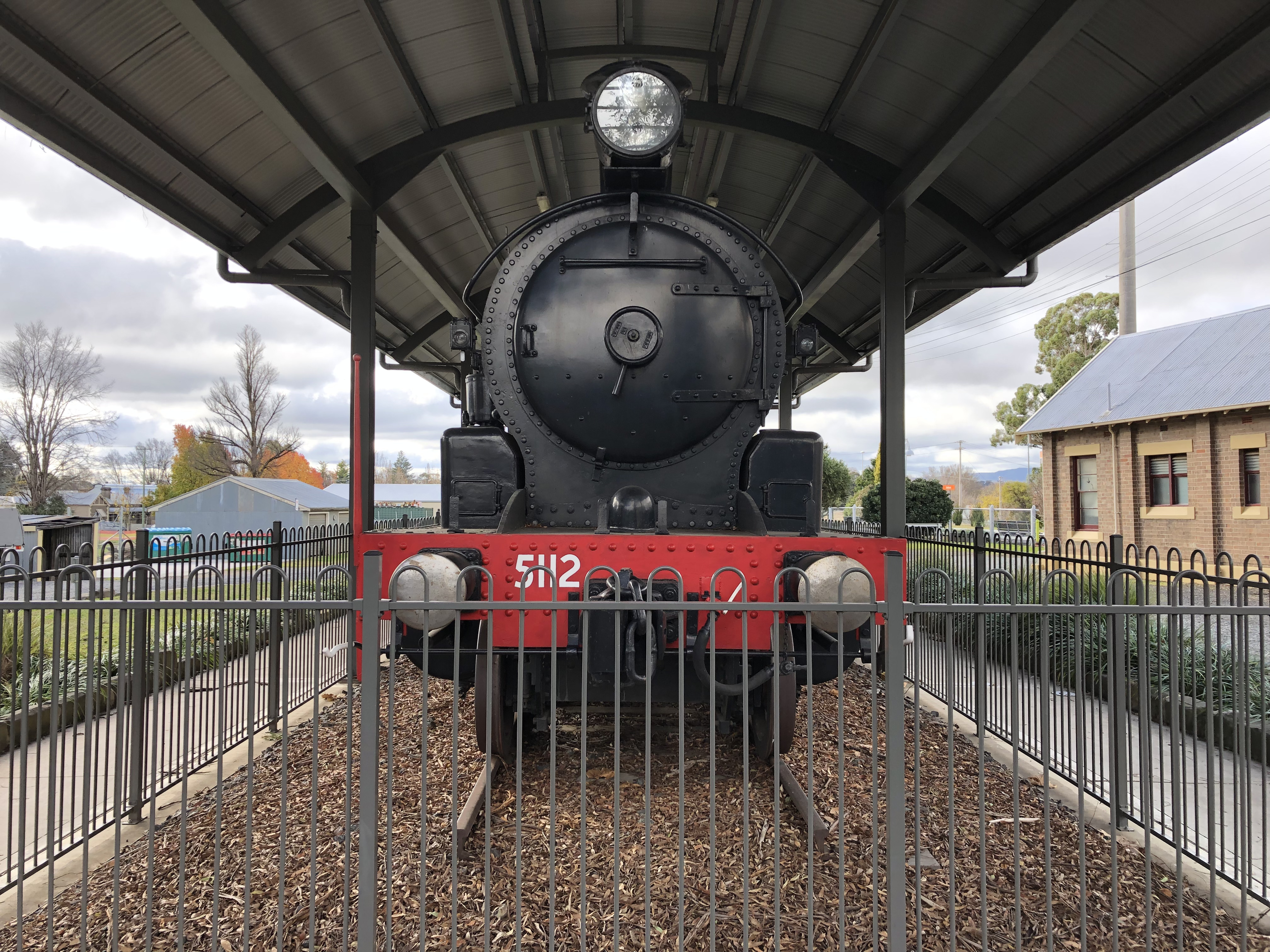
A locomotive driven by Ben Chifley is on display at the station.

The forecourt and landscaped approach to the station entrance, the weighbridge, signal box, goods shed and water reservoir are also heritage-listed.

All structures were reported to generally appear in good condition as at 18 July 2013, apart from the disused subway, which was in poor condition.

The station group including the station buildings, platforms, stationmaster's residence, signal box, and other structures have a high level of integrity.

=== Chifley locomotive ===
One of the locomotives driven by Chifley, 5112, is preserved on a plinth at the eastern end of the station. It was cosmetically restored at the Lithgow State Mine Heritage Park & Railway.

== Heritage listing ==
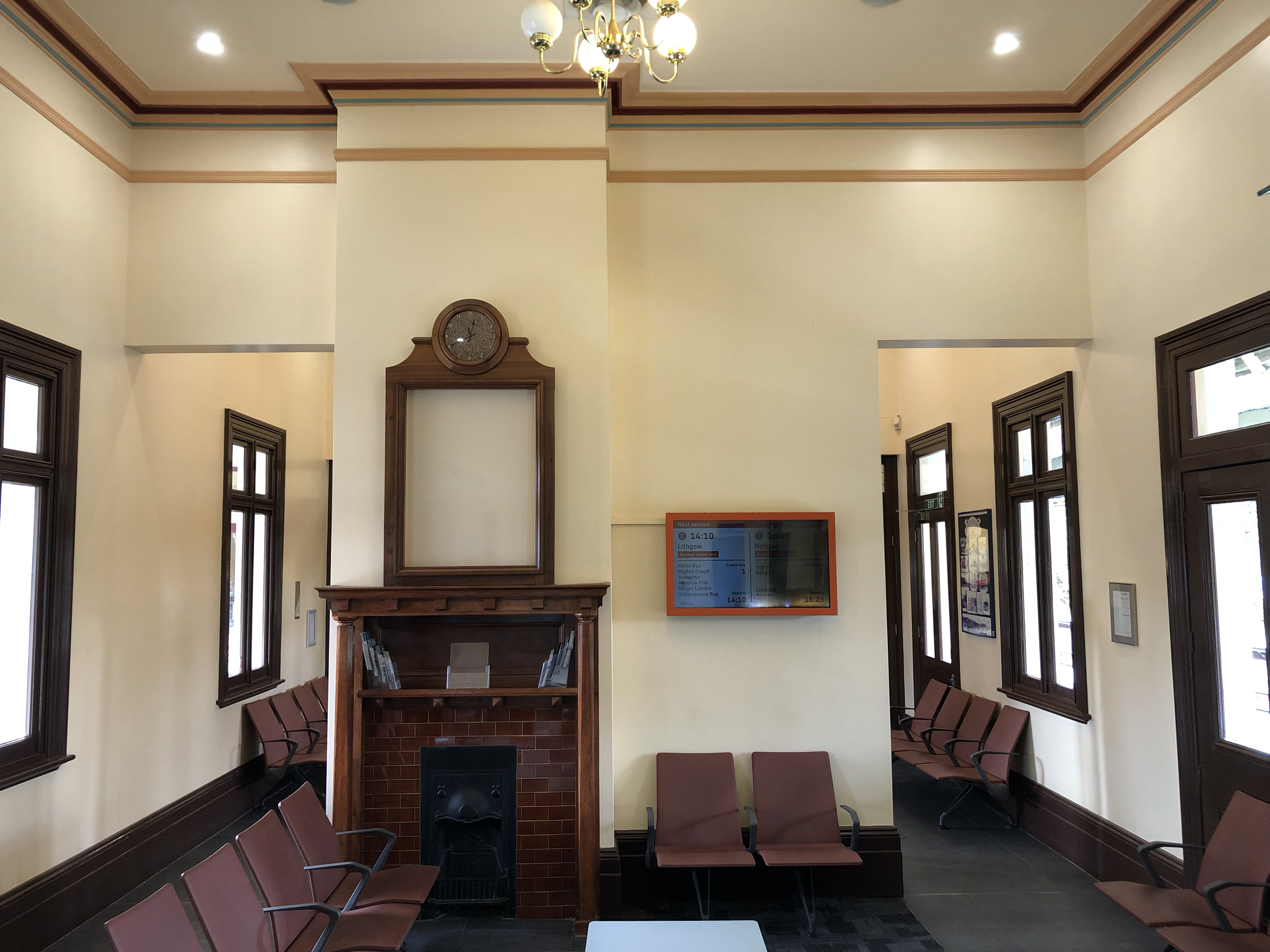
A view from the interior of the station.

Bathurst Railway Precinct is of state significance as a major country railway precinct in NSW that contains a substantial first-class station building, residence and important workshop group with a range of related railway structures. The 1876 station building is a unique Victorian Tudor style railway building and is a fine example of a first-class railway station building with original fabric and fine detailing typical of the period. The scale and detailing of the building reflects the importance of Bathurst as the largest city west of the Blue Mountains. The station is located at the end of Keppel St, one of the main streets of Bathurst and the buildings form a significant civic group in the town of Bathurst, particularly with the location of the residences and Engineer's Office in Havannah St and the orientation of the station building to the town. The station has rarity significance as the design of Bathurst station building is unique to any other building on the NSW rail system. The site is also significant for its association with Ben Chifley, former Prime Minister of Australia, whose early career and education at Bathurst Railway Precinct were instrumental in shaping his trade union and Labor politics.

Bathurst railway station was listed on the New South Wales State Heritage Register on 2 April 1999 having satisfied the following criteria.

The place is important in demonstrating the course, or pattern, of cultural or natural history in New South Wales.

The site has historic significance to demonstrate the late 19th and early 20th Century development of the NSW railways. The station building dates from the opening of the line at Bathurst in 1876, and along with other related structures has the ability to provide evidence of a late 19th Century working railway precinct. The scale and detailing of the station buildings reflect the importance and size of Bathurst as the largest city west of the Blue Mountains.

The place has a strong or special association with a person, or group of persons, of importance of cultural or natural history of New South Wales's history.

The site is significant for its associations with Ben Chifley, Prime Minister of Australia, whose early career and education at Bathurst Railway Precinct were instrumental in shaping his trade union and Labor politics.

The place is important in demonstrating aesthetic characteristics and/or a high degree of creative or technical achievement in New South Wales.

The site has aesthetic significance as a first class railway station that demonstrates railway design in the 1870s. The 1876 station building is a unique Victorian Tudor style railway building and is a fine example of a first class railway station building with original fabric and fine detailing typical of the period. The station is located at the end of Keppel St, one of the main streets of Bathurst and the buildings form a significant civic group in the town of Bathurst, particularly with the location of the residence in Havannah St and the orientation of the station building to the town.

The place has strong or special association with a particular community or cultural group in New South Wales for social, cultural or spiritual reasons.

The site is of social significance to the local community on account of its lengthy association for providing an important source of employment, trade and social interaction for the local area. The site is significant for its ability to contribute to the local community's sense of place, is a distinctive feature of the daily life of many community members, and provides a connection to the local community's past.

The place possesses uncommon, rare or endangered aspects of the cultural or natural history of New South Wales.

The station has rarity significance as the design of Bathurst station building is unique when compared to other buildings on the NSW Railway system.

The place is important in demonstrating the principal characteristics of a class of cultural or natural places/environments in New South Wales.

The site has representative significance for its collection of railway structures, including the SM's residence, waiting shed, signal box, and other related items that collectively demonstrate widespread 19th and early 20th Century railway customs, activities and design in NSW, and are representative of similar items that are found in many other railway sites across the state.
