= Oberon railway station =

Railway station in New South Wales, Australia

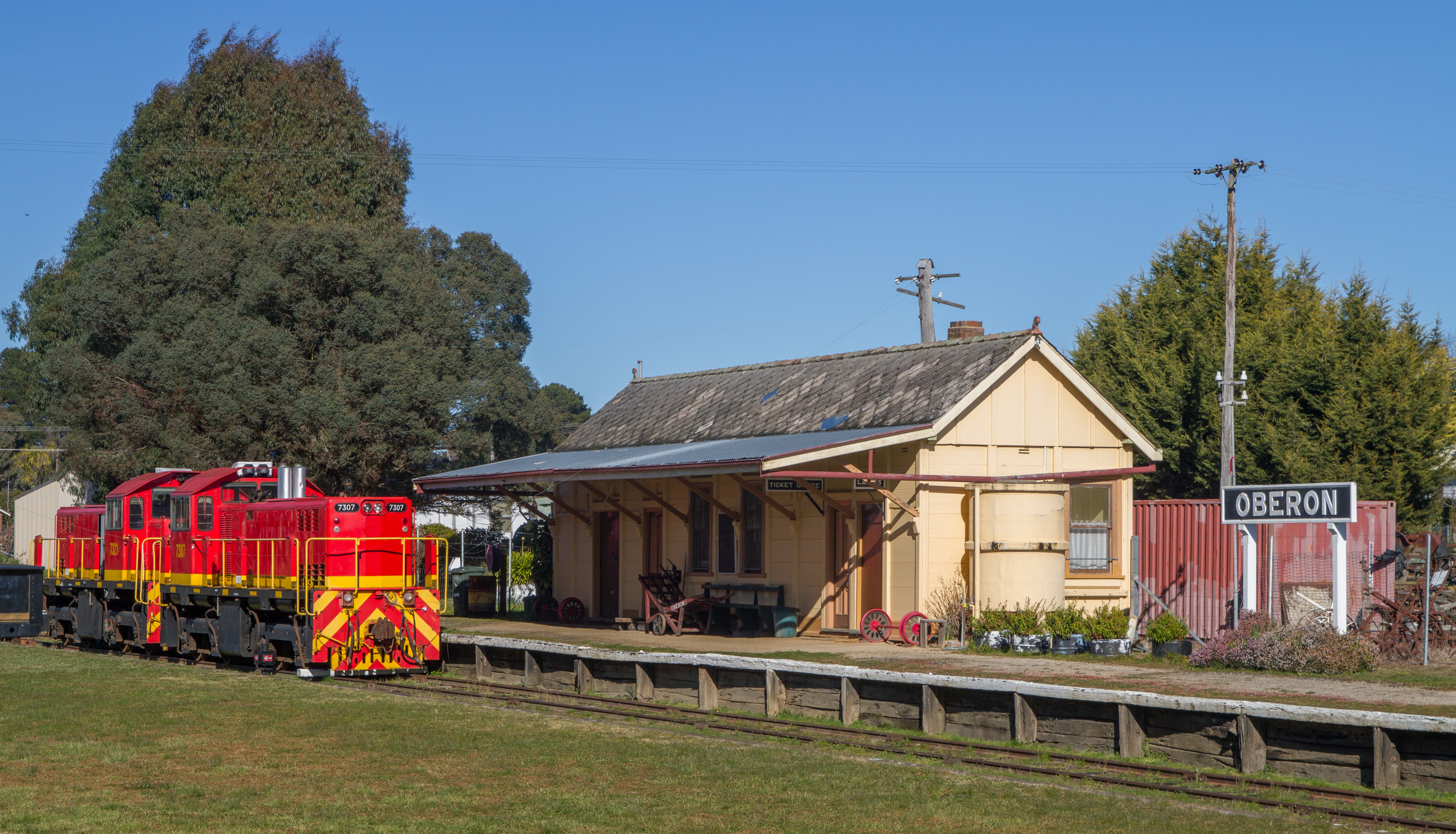
- Oberon railway station in July 2014

General information
- Location: Scotia Avenue, Oberon; Australia
- Owner: Transport Asset Manager of New South Wales
- Operator: Oberon Tarana Heritage Railway
- Line: Oberon
- Platforms: 1
- Tracks: 3

History
- Opened: 3 October 1923
- Location within New South Wales
- 33°42′02″S 149°51′15″E
- Location: Oberon railway line, Oberon, Oberon Shire, New South Wales, Australia

History
- Built: 1923

Site notes
- Elevation: 3,624 feet (1,105 m)
- Owner: Transport Asset Manager of New South Wales

New South Wales Heritage Register
- Official name: Oberon Railway Station group
- Type: State heritage (complex / group)
- Designated: 2 April 1999
- Reference no.: 01215
- Type: Railway Platform / Station
- Category: Transport – Rail
Location

The Oberon railway station is a heritage-listed railway station and now museum located on the Oberon railway line in Oberon, in the Oberon Shire local government area of New South Wales, Australia. The site is also known as the Oberon Railway Station group. The property was added to the New South Wales State Heritage Register on 2 April 1999.

== Description ==
The complex comprises a type 12 pre-cast concrete station building, erected in 1923; a pre-cast concrete water closet, erected in 1923; timber platform faces, completed in 1923; and signs and artefacts, completed in 1923.

== Heritage listing ==
The Oberon railway station is a good example of a pre cast concrete building on a small timber faced platform that is an important part of the town of Oberon.

The Oberon railway station was listed on the New South Wales State Heritage Register on 2 April 1999 having satisfied the following criteria.

The place possesses uncommon, rare or endangered aspects of the cultural or natural history of New South Wales.

This item is assessed as historically rare. This item is assessed as archaeologically rare. This item is assessed as socially rare.
