= Tarana, New South Wales =

Tarana
- Town
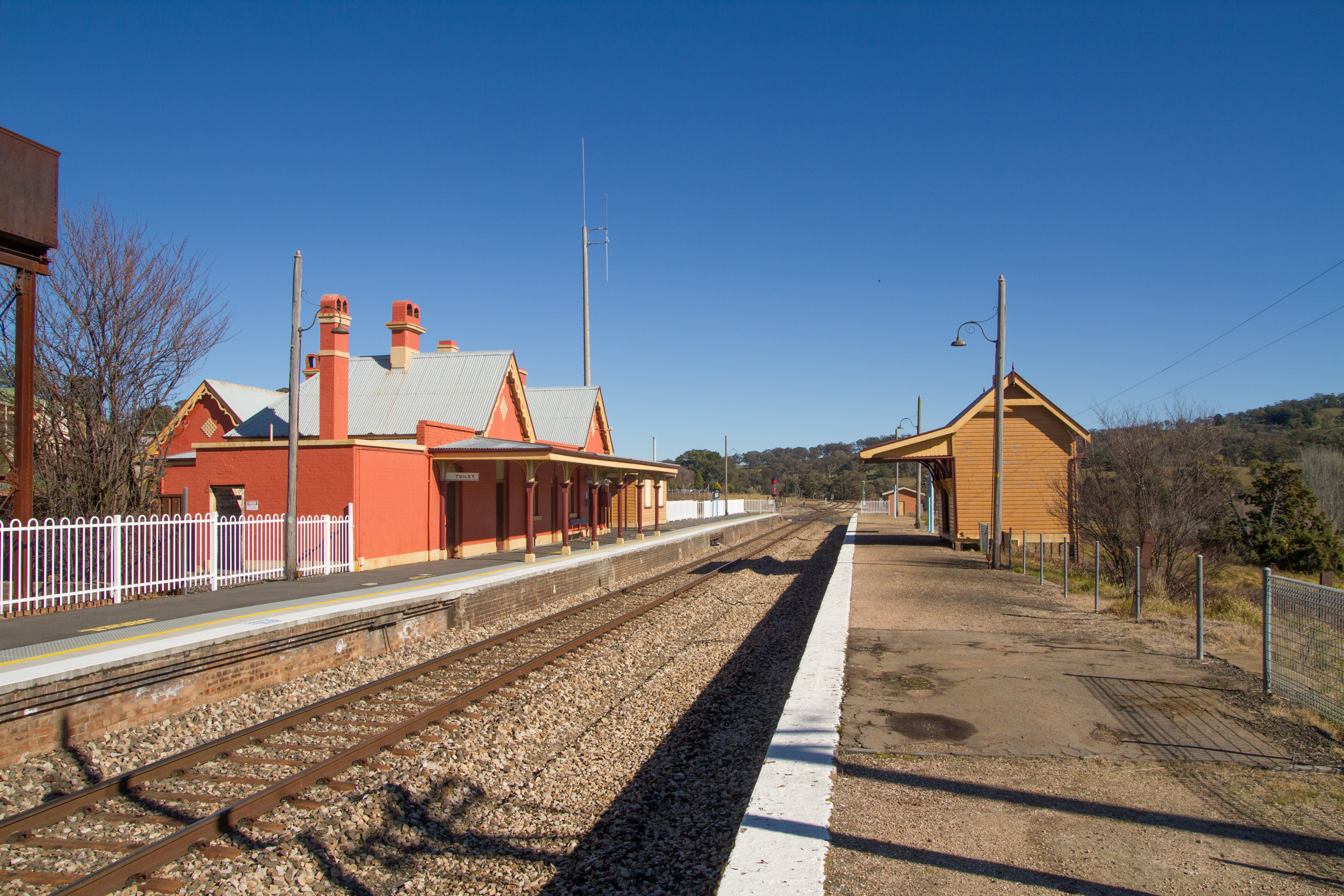
- Tarana railway station

- Coordinates: 33°31′S 149°55′E
- Country: Australia
- State: New South Wales
- Region: Central Tablelands
- LGA: City of Lithgow

Government
  - State electorate: Bathurst
  - Federal division: Calare

Population
  - Total: 187 (SAL 2021)
- County: Australia

Tarana is a small town in the Central West of New South Wales, Australia in the City of Lithgow.

It is the former junction of the Oberon Branch railway with the Main Western Line. This branch line was notable for its steep 1 in 30 gradients and sharp 100 metres (330 ft) curves.

== History ==
The name Tarana comes from an Aboriginal word meaning watering hole. Tarana railway station was opened on 22 April 1872.

== Heritage listings ==
Tarana has a number of heritage-listed sites, including:

- Main Western railway: Tarana railway station

== See also ==
- Tarana travel guide from Wikivoyage
