= Ben Chifley's House =

Chifley Home and Education Centre
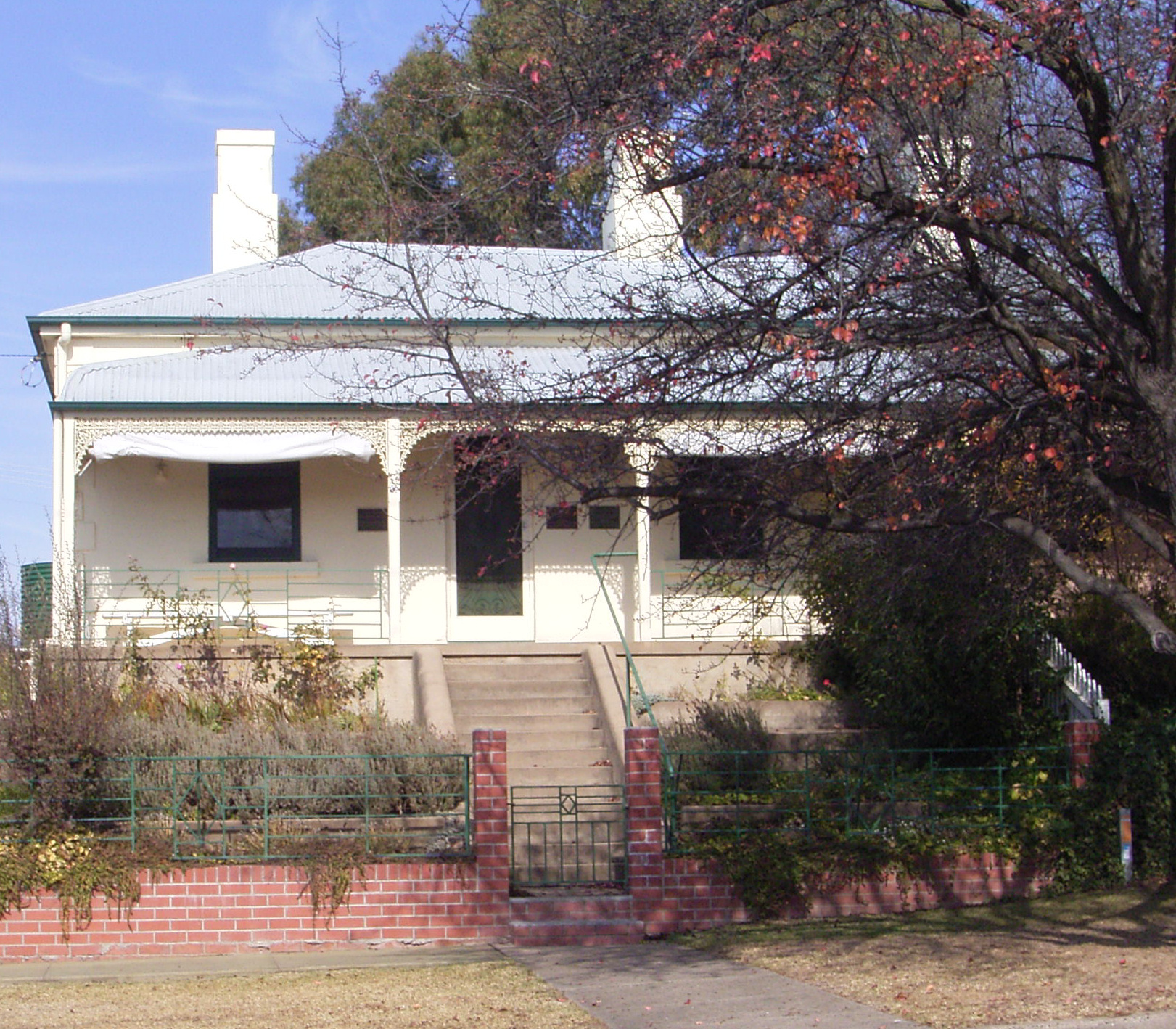

- Location within New South Wales Location within Australia
- 33.4328°S 149.5776°E
- Location: 10-12 Busby Street, Bathurst, Bathurst Region, New South Wales, Australia

History
- Built: 1887–1891

Site notes
- Owner: Bathurst Regional Council

New South Wales Heritage Register
- Official name: Chifley Home and Education Centre
- Type: state heritage (built)
- Designated: 23 December 2002
- Reference no.: 1657
- Type: House
- Category: Residential buildings (private)

Chifley Home is a heritage-listed former residence and now museum in Bathurst, in the Central West region of New South Wales, Australia. It was built from 1887 to 1891. The property is owned by Bathurst Regional Council. It was added to the New South Wales State Heritage Register on 23 December 2002.

== History ==
10 Busby Street 'Carnwath' was the residence of Ben Chifley, Prime Minister of Australia 1945-1951, and his wife Elizabeth Chifley (née McKenzie). The Chifleys lived there from their marriage in 1914 until their deaths in 1951 and 1962 respectively.

The date of construction of the Chifley cottage is unclear but believed to be about c.1882-91. A Lands Department map of the area published in 1883 shows the land then unoccupied by any house and still part of a 100-acre block granted to Sir John Jamison which bordered the south side of Busby Street. (Busby Street also formed the boundary of Bathurst municipality). Land title documents show a subdivision occurring sometime in the 1880s.

The first owners of Lot 26, on which the house was built, were Walter William Spencer and Jane McCarthy. Walter Spencer was a leading medical practitioner in Bathurst and an active speculator in property and mining ventures. In April 1887, Spencer and McCarthy sold the lot to John Dunkley and Richard Bartlett. In October 1891, the lot was sold to Thomas Leighton, a fireman on the railway. Thomas and Isabella Leighton's occupation of the adjoining No.12 terrace suggests Thomas Leighton may have purchased both houses around that time but on separate titles. According to the Electoral Rolls, Isabella Leighton lived in Busby Street (presumably No. 12) until at least 1915. Thomas is not listed as resident anywhere in Bathurst after the 1903 Electoral Roll, and appears to have died in Junee in 1917.

A land title description of the lot boundaries indicate that the present house was standing on the land on 2 October 1891. There is a reference to the boundary line passing through the centre of a nine-inch (22 cm) brick wall dividing the two cottages. The raising of a mortgage after purchase by Bartlett suggests the house may have been built during this period of ownership (1887-1891), possibly as a speculative investment. The area, known as Milltown, was popular with the growing railway community as the rents were low and it was close to their workplaces. The street formed the boundary between Abercrombie Shire and Bathurst Municipality until 1937 when the area was incorporated into Bathurst. The house was on the Abercrombie Shire side of the street and therefore less expensive. It housed railway families and was eventually purchased in 1903 as a rental property investment by George McKenzie, engine driver. George, his wife and daughter Elizabeth, 17, lived directly behind the Busby Street House, and they named the house "Carnwath" after George's home town in Scotland. Elizabeth would eventually marry Ben Chifley.

With both coming from local railway families, it was not surprising that Ben would come into contact with Elizabeth McKenzie. The two courted and were married on 6 June 1914 in Glebe. Ben was from a Catholic background, and Elizabeth from a Presbyterian family, and in the context of the times theirs was considered a "mixed marriage", hence the distant location of the wedding to avoid embarrassment to family and friends. The McKenzies gave Elizabeth "Carnwath" as a wedding gift.

Ben Chifley was born in Bathurst and joined the railways when he was 17. He became the youngest First Class locomotive driver by the time he was 24, and became involved in trade union politics through the Locomotive Enginemen's Association. Ben was demoted to engine cleaner for his part in the 1917 Railway strike, which paradoxically lead to his increased involvement in politics. He also began to study economics, shaping his philosophy and understanding of people's needs.

In 1920 the McKenzies gave Elizabeth full title to "Carnwath", and she in turn transferred the title into joint ownership with Ben. The property would remain their home even during Chifley's parliamentary career which began in 1928 when he was elected as the Labor member for Macquarie, a constituency covering Bathurst and its surrounding districts. He lost the seat in 1931 and regained in 1940. Even while Prime Minister from 1945 to 1949 and until his death in 1951, he tried to return to it at least one weekend every fortnight. In part this is explained by Elizabeth wishing to be close to her ageing parents and her own poor health, but also by Chifley's view that he needed to maintain contact with, and be seen to maintain contact, with his constituents.

In 1939 the Chifleys purchased the vacant block next door and built a garage for Ben's American Buick. The garage was entered from the back lane, and the car was kept out of sight. The garage was later demolished. The Chifley's were one of the first to have a telephone due to Ben's political activities.

At some time in the mid 1940s, Isabel Clark, the widow of a railway friend of Ben's who had provided much companionship for Elizabeth during Ben's time in Canberra, came to live permanently in the house. The two women remained in the house after Ben Chifley's death until Elizabeth died in 1962. She left the property to St Stephen's Presbyterian Church on the condition that Isabel Clark could remain there until her own death, and Mrs Clark lived there until she died in 1969. After her death, a public appeal allowed Bathurst City Council to purchase the house and its contents in 1972 as a memorial to Ben Chifley. It was opened as a house museum by Gough Whitlam, then Prime Minister, on 24 March 1973, and continues to function as a house museum.

David Day's 2001 biography of Chifley provides an understanding of the role of "Carnwath" in the lived life and the projected image of Ben Chifley, local member and prime minister.

"His home in Bathurst, which has survived with much of its decoration and contents intact, remains a powerful source from which to gain insights into the texture of his daily life" (ix). The Chifley's "lives were lived in two separate compartments. Like many women of her time and class, Lizzie's life revolved around the kitchen, where she continued to assemble books of recipes, cutting them out of newspapers and magazines before trying them out on Chifley or friends and relatives. There was also the back parlour, or on sunny days the verandah, where she would do the intricate needlework that still decorates the mantelpieces and dressers of their compact home. On the whole hers was largely an indoor world that seems to have become progressively more so as her ill-health increasingly restricted her mobility" (155). Chifley "was a man of some means whose abstemious style of living helped to stave off any financial problems. Even as prime minister, he would make no substantial changes to the Busby Street house. The furniture in the house was relatively cheap and mass-produced; the kitchen retained its one cold tap in the small sink; and the bathroom, laundry and toilet all remained outside the house. On a frosty winter's morning, Lizzie and her ageing mother, as well as Chifley, had to face the daunting prospect of going outside to reach both the toilet and the bathroom. He had the money to enclose these services, or even to shift to a more comfortable residence, but he would never do so. Chifley's experience during the 1890s depression, and the example of his equally frugal grandfather, and of Lizzie's father, helped to make Chifley more than careful with his money" Chifley "also had some leisure time to indulge his interest in gardening and to lay concrete paths around the house. There also would have been time to spend reading in the morning sunshine on his front verandah, with its extensive views over South Bathurst to the soft blues of the distant mountains beyond, time to take in the wide streets and mostly humble cottages, the red-brick St Barnabas' Anglican Church in the centre of his view and the shunting engines of the railway yards to the right, while the discordant sounds of the massive railway workshops would have been both a distraction and a reminder of things past" (295).

"Chifley's local involvements gained a new dimension in February 1933 when he joined the Abercrombie Shire Council in place of a councillor who had been killed in a car accident. Chifley's Busby Street address just brought him within the boundary of the shire" (300). "Chifley's position on the council allowed him to develop contacts in the more rural areas of Macquarie electorate, and to become more aware of the particular problems of farmers and graziers" (302). "The month after his accession to the Council, it agreed to provide kerbing and guttering to Busby Street provided the residents paid half the cost, which they promptly did. Chifley's commitment to the Abercrombie Shire Council was shown in 1935 when he opposed an attempt by Bathurst Council to include within its boundary those parts of South Bathurst, including Chifley's Busby Street house, that fell within Abercrombie Shire. It could mean the end of his time on the council, and he was unable to stop it. Bathurst Council finally got its way in 1937. Rather than switching his allegiance across to Bathurst Council, where the councillors were more of his political persuasion and where his friend and political ally Martin Griffin was still the mayor, Chifley opted to stay with Abercrombie Shire. Just as he was about to be debarred, Chifley bought a small block of land within the shire that allowed his involvement to continue" (304).

"Chifley's contemplative, pipe-smoking persona and amiable personality helped him to deal with [public] deputations and gave him the gravitas appropriate to his prime ministerial position. He chose his clothes carefully and was most particular about their quality and fitting. No longer did he wear socks knitted by his mother-in-law; and he was sufficiently fastidious to have his shoes made in Sydney and his shirts made by Myer in Melbourne. An elderly tailor in Martin Place made up his suits. Despite all this there was nothing "flash" about his clothing, with Chifley having "a deep rooted dislike of any degree of ostentation in his dressing" and being pleased when journalists were misled by the apparent age of his clothes. Indeed, he was in the habit of wearing over his carefully tailored clothes what he called his 'dead man's coat'. It was bequeathed to him by "some old chap whom he knew only slightly". It was akin to him parking his Buick in the garage next to his humble Bathurst cottage" (450).

"Among the letters dealt with that day [13 June 1951] he wrote to a staunch supporter in Lithgow, Jim Robson, regarding a report of some prize chrysanthemums having been grown by a resident of the town. Chifley asked Robson, if he happened to meet the grower "in the near future", to "ask him to set aside two dozen plants, not white or light pink", as he would "like to try some in Bathurst". He also made his customary trunk at 7pm to tell Lizzie, telling her he was feeling alright. Some time later, while Chifley was in bed, he was struck by a sudden and terribly familiar chest pain. He slipped into a coma, and by 10.30pm Chifley was dead" (525-526).

On the day of his death, Ben Chifley had sought out some prize chrysanthemums from a friend in Lithgow. It was not just because he was keen on gardening. Lizzie also used to send occasional bunches of chrysanthemums to a woman she had befriended at the Chinese Legation in Canberra who had explained that chrysanthemums had a special meaning for Chinese people. They were associated "with righteousness as they bloom not in the warm spring when other flowers flourish, but bloom in the frosty autumn air like a righteous man outstanding in society". Chifley was such a man" (529).

"Chifley has left an indelible image of a humble, self-effacing man who would rather have been digging in his garden than debating in parliament. As journalist Alan Reid observed, Chifley had a real "distaste for what he called "putting on the dog"" and mostly lived the sort of simple life that reflected that feeling, which perhaps had its roots in his life with his grandfather at Limekilns. The public image was one that he had created and which had a solid core of truth to it. At the same time, it was embellished by Don Rodgers, with Chifley's connivance, for the benefit of public consumption and to further his political aims. As one observer wrote, Chifley was "s superb actor" and played to the public image, not out of insincerity but because he realised that "he was required to set an example, and he set it with real artistry". The Chifley's Busby Street home was central to the creation of this image of a political leader with frugal habits. That he drove a Buick could not be ignored, but Chifley's attention to his clothes seems never to have been remarked upon, other than the oft-publicised fact of him refusing to wear a dinner jacket. As the Labor propaganda proclaimed, Chifley was "a man of the people" and many could relate to his lifestyle and admire him for it during the war and afterwards. However, it was not so attractive an image by the late 1940s when Australia's middle class in particular was anxious to cast off the privations of wartime and the enjoy the relative prosperity that was gradually becoming available to them as a result of Chifley's policies" (531).

"Lizzie lived on until 1962, when she died in her home in Busby Street at the age of 76. There was a large funeral, partly reflecting Chifley's standing but also Lizzie's quiet contribution to the life of the town. Chifley's Busby Street house passed into the control of the Presbyterian Church before being bought by Bathurst City Council, which has preserved it as a powerful memorial to Chifley's life (532-533).

Ben Chifley remains a person of strong public standing in Australia. NSW Premier Bob Carr, writing in his reflections on his public life, recalled (in the third person):

"He had joined the local branch of the Labor Party at the start of the year and sat silently through its monthly meetings. Now he has decided it is time to make his move. In the pocket of his school blazer, on a page torn from an exercise book, are two propositions written in his adolescent scrawl. Tonight, when the meeting comes to general business, he will move:

That Ben Chifley's home in Bathurst should be made an historic memorial as a tribute to the greatest-ever Prime Minister; and
That the Labor Party establish its own daily newspaper".

== Education Centre ==
The Education Centre, in adjoining 12 Busby Street, was purchased by Bathurst Regional Council. It was renovated and opened in 2012 by then-Prime Minister Julia Gillard. It houses temporary exhibitions, interpretation of the museum itself, and a replica sitting room with pianola.

== Description ==
The house is a small Victorian Italianate semi-detached residence of rendered brick under a hipped iron roof. It has a symmetrical facade with central front door reached by a flight of brick steps. It has a full-width bull-nosed verandah with cast-iron columns and frieze. A later wrought iron balustrade has been added.

Internally the house consists of two bedrooms, a parlour, dining room, kitchen and pantry, and then a bathroom at the rear accessed by a covered verandah.

Behind the kitchen and accessed from the outside is a small laundry, toilet and store. The house is furnished with original furniture and fittings.

The house forms part of a group of semi-detached houses.

The house was reported to be in good condition as at 13 September 2002. The house and contents are almost unaltered from the time of occupation of the Chifleys and Elizabeth Chifley's companion, Isabel Clark.

=== Modifications and dates ===
The separate kitchen was joined to the rest of the house by making a walk-in pantry in the gap. Electricity, water and sewerage were connected during the 20th century. A weatherboard bathroom with asbestos cement lining and a Derwent gas heater was added to the rear. A gas fireplace was installed in the parlour and a Challenger gas cooker in the kitchen. Fibrous cornices have been added to the bedroom and sitting room. In 1939 the vacant block next door was added and a garage, now demolished, was built. (McLachlan)

== Heritage listing ==
Ben Chifley's House is of state significance for:

- its associations with the significant activity of housing a national leader, Ben Chifley, Prime Minister of Australia 1945-1949;
- for its ability to demonstrate the frugal nature of Chifley's domestic lifestyle, and the way in which that lifestyle was used to project an image of Ben Chifley as 'a plain man';
- for the simple, mass-produced furnishings, the home-made decorations, the domestic nature of the gardens and yard, the location of the house in the working class "Milltown" area of Bathurst, and the collection of books, photographs and other memorabilia contained in the house that evidence the associations with Ben Chifley;
- for association with his image as a plain speaking local man with a vision for the whole nation, best expressed in his words: "a great objective "the light on the hill" which we aim to reach by working for the betterment of mankind not only here but anywhere we may give a helping hand";
- for its associations with the people of New South Wales and Australia, who continue to hold Ben Chifley in high regard for his leadership of the country during his term as prime minister in the early post-war years between 1945 and 1949; and
- as the only known example of a house in New South Wales occupied by a Labor prime minister throughout his adult life and which retains an ability to demonstrate the occupancy of that prime minister and the associations between that prime minister, his lifestyle, political views and projected image.

The only comparable places are the Residence of John Curtin in Western Australia, Western Australia and Joseph Lyons' house "Home Hill" near Devonport, Tasmania.

Ben Chifley's House was listed on the New South Wales State Heritage Register on 23 December 2002 having satisfied the following criteria.

The place is important in demonstrating the course, or pattern, of cultural or natural history in New South Wales.

Ben Chifley's House is of state significance for its associations with the significant activity of housing a national leader, Ben Chifley, Prime Minister of Australia 1945-1949. The house demonstrates the domestic life of a Labor prime minister whose lifestyle and political views had been formed, in part, by growing up in the Bathurst district during the economically hard times of the 1890s-1900s, and working in the nearby railways. The house demonstrates the frugal nature of Chifley's lifestyle, and the way in which that lifestyle was used to develop an empathy with people and communities across the state and nation who had experienced similar circumstances from the 1890s to the 1930s, and to project an image of Ben Chifley as "a plain man". The house also demonstrates the lifestyle of a mid-twentieth century woman in an Australian country town that yielded little to the sophisticated imagery often associated with a national political leader (HO)

The place has a strong or special association with a person, or group of persons, of importance of cultural or natural history of New South Wales's history.

Ben Chifley's House is of state significance for the evidence it contains in the form of its contents, layout, landscaping and associated reminiscences and writings that clearly associate the place with former Prime Minister Ben Chifley. The simple, mass-produced furnishings, the home-made decorations, the domestic nature of the gardens and yard, the location of the house in the working class "Milltown" area of Bathurst, and the collection of books, photographs and other memorabilia contained in the house evidence the associations with Ben Chifley, and with his image as a plain speaking local man with a vision for the whole nation, best expressed in his words: a great objective - the light on the hill - which we aim to reach by working for the betterment of mankind not only here but anywhere we may give a helping hand

Ben Chifley's House is of state significance for an association with Premier Bob Carr who has written in his recently published memoirs of moving as his first motion at his local ALP branch meeting 'That Ben Chifley's home at Bathurst should be made an historic memorial as a tribute to the greatest-ever prime minister'; and for its associations with prime ministers Gough Whitlam and Bob Hawke whose visits to the house are commemorated by plaques adjacent to the front door.

The place is important in demonstrating aesthetic characteristics and/or a high degree of creative or technical achievement in New South Wales.

Ben Chifley's house is of local significance for its ability to exemplify the domestic tastes and styles of mid-20th century working-class families in the Bathurst area and its associations with local technical innovations such as the introduction of domestic telephones and domestic gas heating (HO)

The place has a strong or special association with a particular community or cultural group in New South Wales for social, cultural or spiritual reasons.

Ben Chifley's House is of state significance for its associations with the people of New South Wales and Australia, who continue to hold Ben Chifley in high regard for his leadership of the country during his term as prime minister in the early post-war years between 1945 and 1949 when he promoted full employment, industrialisation, bank nationalisation, publicly funded social welfare, constitutional reform, missile defence, migration, national development and Australian independence as Australia's "Golden Age" (HO)

The place possesses uncommon, rare or endangered aspects of the cultural or natural history of New South Wales.

Ben Chifley's House is of state significance as the only known example of a house in New South Wales occupied by a Labor prime minister throughout his adult life and which retains an ability to demonstrate the occupancy of that prime minister and the associations between that prime minister, his lifestyle, political views and projected image. The only comparable places are John Curtin's House in Cottesloe, WA and Joe Lyon's House "Home Hill" near Devonport, Tasmania. (HO)

The place is important in demonstrating the principal characteristics of a class of cultural or natural places/environments in New South Wales.

Ben Chifley's House is of local significance as a representative example of the type of working class housing built in the South Bathurst or "Milltown" area of Bathurst between the 1880s and 1910s using mass-produced materials, such as brick and corrugated iron, on small lots in the vicinity of the main industrial and transport, especially railway, facilities in the town, still containing the furnishings and other contents associated with its residential use during the mid-twentieth century. (HO)
