= Chifley =

Chifley can refer to:

- Ben Chifley (1885–1951), Prime Minister of Australia from 1945 to 1949
- Elizabeth Chifley (1886–1962), wife of Ben Chifley
- Chifley, Australian Capital Territory, a suburb of Canberra named after him
- Chifley, New South Wales, a suburb of Sydney
- Division of Chifley, an outer suburban Sydney electorate in the Australian House of Representatives, also named after Chifley
