= The National Advocate =

Former newspaper in Bathurst, Australia

The National Advocate, 26 September 1889

The National Advocate was a daily newspaper published in Bathurst, New South Wales, Australia, between 1889 and 1963.

== Newspaper history ==
The newspaper was established on 28 September 1889, co-founded by Australian businessman James Rutherford as a vehicle to put forward a protectionist viewpoint. The newspaper's board of directors included Francis Halliday who was at that time was president of the Bathurst National Protection League.

The National Advocate had a reputation as the local mouthpiece of the Australian Labor Party, in contrast to the conservative-leaning Bathurst Times. For many years its manager was John Percival, a Labor member of the New South Wales Legislative Council. Percival was forced to resign in 1923 after being caught misusing company money.

In 1920, federal Nationalist MP Archdale Parkhill brought a libel suit against the National Advocate. He was awarded significant damages, which combined with legal fees cost the paper almost £7,000 and nearly bankrupted it. However, the paper soon returned to profitability and in 1926 was even able to begin paying a 10 percent dividend to its shareholders.

Future prime minister Ben Chifley was appointed to the newspaper's board of directors in 1921, occupying the place that had previously been held by his father. He eventually came to own about 10 percent of the company's shares, and his wife Lizzie held additional shares in her own name. When his political career allowed – such as after his electoral defeat in 1931 – he acted as a sort of managing director.

In 1939, The National Advocate's circulation was approximately 3,200 at the cost of one penny. As with many other regional newspapers, it struggled financially during World War II and never recovered its previous influence or circulation. The newspaper ceased publication on 30 March 1963 after it merged with the Western Times to form the newspaper The Western Advocate.

== Digitisation ==
The paper has been digitised as part of the Australian Newspapers Digitisation Program of the National Library of Australia.

== See also ==
- List of newspapers in Australia
- List of newspapers in New South Wales
