= The Bathurst Advocate =

Historical Australian newspaper

The Bathurst Advocate was a weekly English language broadsheet newspaper published in Bathurst, New South Wales, Australia.

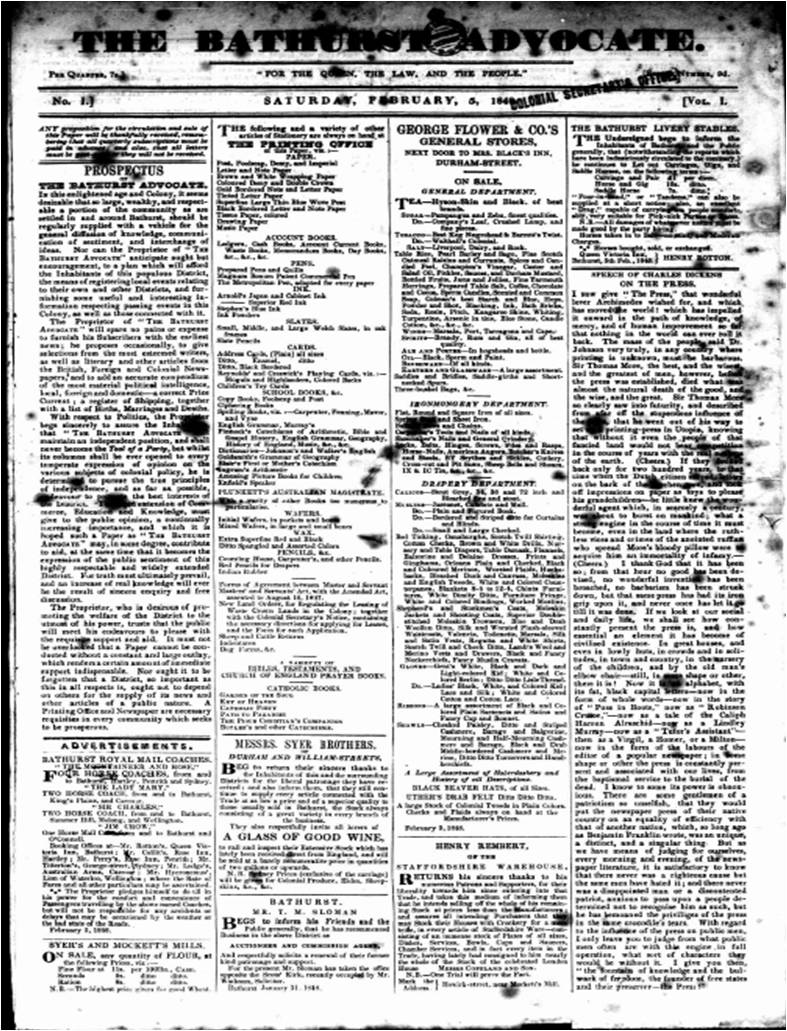
Cover page of Bathurst Advocate, 5 February 1848

== History ==
This newspaper was first published on 5 February 1848 by Benjamin Isaacs, possibly with financial support from Geoffrey Amos Eagar, an accountant. Isaacs had previously set up two newspapers in Parramatta, New South Wales, as well as one in New Zealand. After 10 issues of the paper had been published, its subscribers numbered 70. Only 87 issues of the paper were published, the last being number 39 of Volume 2, which was published on 29 September 1849. The short life span of the newspaper has been attributed to two libel actions which were brought against the editor in 1849.

During that year the paper regularly published criticisms of the local police, and in particular the Chief Constable, John Davies. A poem published by the paper resulted in a libel action by Davies. In reporting the libel action in the newspaper, Isaacs re-published the verses which had sparked the court action, thus leading to a second action.

Before the libel suits came to court, Isaacs sold the Advocate's press, types and building to William Farrand for £450. Farrand then started up the Bathurst Free Press newspaper, publishing the first issue on 6 October 1849. Isaacs was imprisoned for two months and was fined £40 1s.

== Digitisation ==
The paper has been digitised as part of the Australian Newspapers Digitisation Program of the National Library of Australia.

== See also ==
- List of newspapers in New South Wales
- List of Newspapers in Australia
- List of Defunct Newspapers of Australia
