= The Bathurst Free Press and Mining Journal =

Former newspaper in NSW, Australia

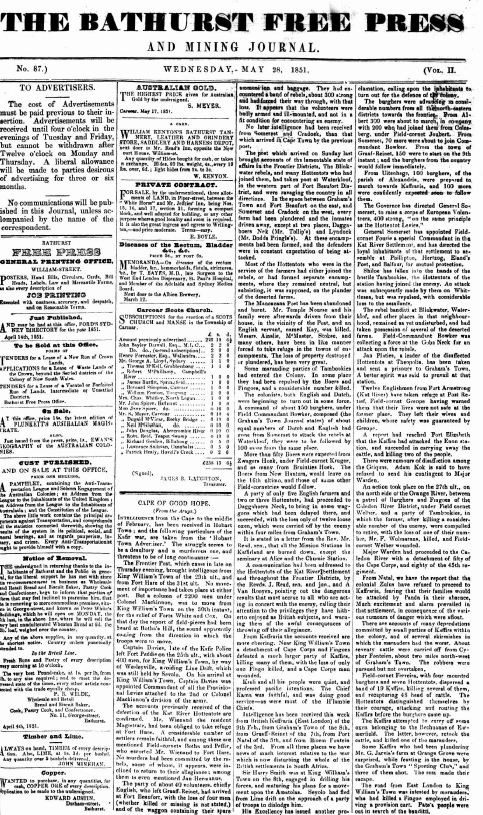
Front page of the first issue titled as The Bathurst Free Press and Mining Journal, 28 May 1851.

The Bathurst Free Press and Mining Journal, also published as The Bathurst Free Press, Bathurst Times, Bathurst Argus, Bathurst Daily Argus, Western Times and Western Advocate, was a semiweekly English language broadsheet newspaper published in Bathurst, New South Wales, Australia.

== History ==
The Bathurst Free Press took over from The Bathurst Advocate and was first published on 6 October 1849 by William Farrand. It sought to differentiate itself from the Advocate by changing its title and "being permitted to speak for ourselves in the plural, rather than the singular number". The paper changed its title again on 28 May 1851 to Bathurst Free Press and Mining Journal alongside an increase in its subscription rate due to the "pressing demands for early intelligence from the Gold Country".

In 1859, John Charles White took over the publication over the newspaper and it remained in the family's occupation until it ceased distribution in March 1904. In 1884 White's sons Charles and Gloster White took over as editor and business manager respectively. As editor, Charles used the paper as a platform to advocate for free trade and Federation. This eventually led to a backlash from the community, as local protectionists were openly criticised. Consequently, Charles sold his share of the paper to Gloster in 1902.

The newspaper merged with The Bathurst Times (which had been in publication since 1858) in 1904 and was renamed The Bathurst Argus. Later that year it was renamed The Bathurst Daily Argus and was published under this name until 1909. From 1909 to 1936, the newspaper was published at different times as Bathurst Times and Western Times before being published as The Western Times from 1936-1963 when it was absorbed by The National Advocate and both papers were published as the Western Advocate. The National Advocate had been in publication since 1889.

The Western Times split from the Western Advocate in 1981. Both papers remain in publication.

=== Publication history ===
Publication name	Commenced publication	Ceased publication
Bathurst Free Press	1849	1851
Bathurst Free Press and Mining Journal	1851	1904
Bathurst Times	1858	1904
National Advocate	1889	1963
Bathurst Argus	1904	1904
Bathurst Daily Argus	1904	1909
Bathurst Times	1909	1925
Western Times	1926	1931
Bathurst Times	1931	1936
Western Times	1936	1963
Western Advocate	1963	
Western Times	1981	2021

== Digitisation ==
The paper has been digitised as part of the Australian Newspapers Digitisation Program project of the National Library of Australia.

== See also ==
- List of newspapers in Australia
- List of newspapers in New South Wales
