= Ben Chifley =

Prime Minister of Australia from 1945 to 1949

The Right Honourable Ben Chifley
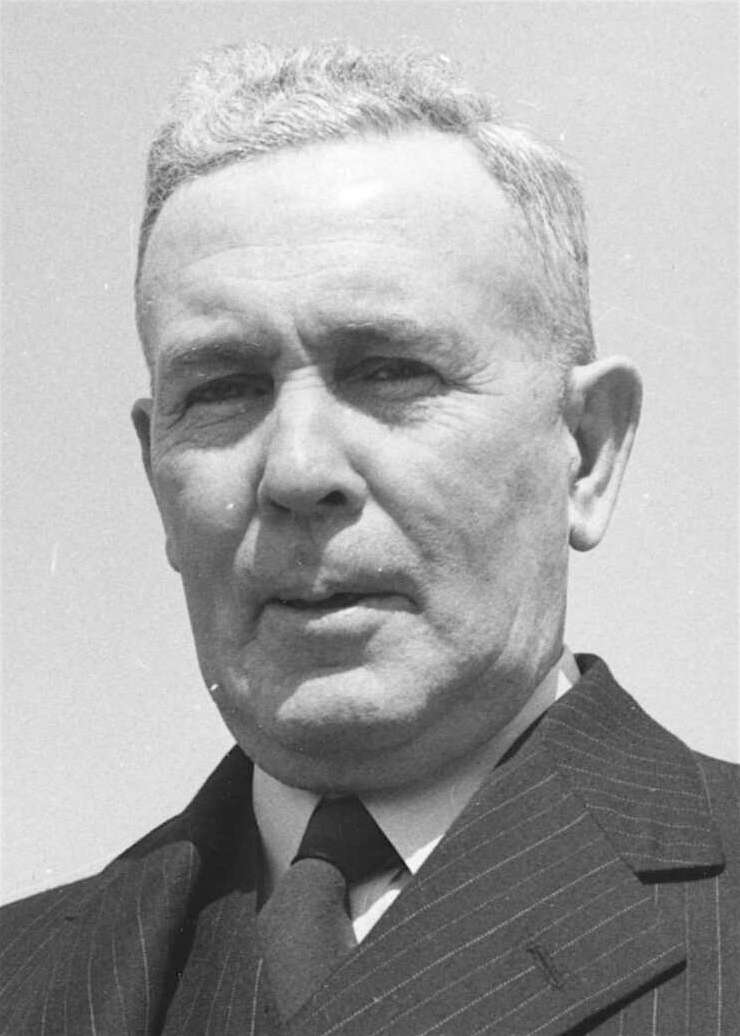
- Chifley in 1948

16th Prime Minister of Australia
- In office 13 July 1945 – 19 December 1949
- Monarch: George VI
- Governors-General: The Duke of Gloucester; Sir William McKell
- Deputy: Frank Forde; Herbert Evatt
- Preceded by: Frank Forde
- Succeeded by: Robert Menzies

8th Leader of the Labor Party
- In office 13 July 1945 – 13 June 1951
- Deputy: Frank Forde; Herbert Evatt
- Preceded by: John Curtin (Note: Frank Forde acted from 6 July to 13 July 1945.)
- Succeeded by: Herbert Evatt

Treasurer of Australia
- In office 7 October 1941 – 18 December 1949
- Prime Minister: John Curtin; Frank Forde; Himself
- Preceded by: Arthur Fadden
- Succeeded by: Arthur Fadden

Leader of the Opposition
- In office 19 December 1949 – 13 June 1951
- Prime Minister: Robert Menzies
- Deputy: Herbert Evatt
- Preceded by: Robert Menzies
- Succeeded by: Herbert Evatt

Minister for Postwar Reconstruction
- In office 22 December 1942 – 2 February 1945
- Prime Minister: John Curtin
- Preceded by: Office Created
- Succeeded by: John Dedman

Minister for Defence
- In office 3 March 1931 – 6 January 1932
- Prime Minister: James Scullin
- Preceded by: John Daly
- Succeeded by: George Pearce

Member of the Australian Parliament for Macquarie
- In office 21 September 1940 – 13 June 1951
- Preceded by: John Lawson
- Succeeded by: Tony Luchetti
- In office 17 November 1928 – 19 December 1931
- Preceded by: Arthur Manning
- Succeeded by: John Lawson

Personal details
- Born: Joseph Benedict Chifley; 22 September 1885 Bathurst, Colony of New South Wales
- Died: 13 June 1951 (aged 65) Canberra, Australia
- Party: Labor
- Other political affiliations: Industrial Labor (1938–1939)
- Spouse: Elizabeth McKenzie (m. 1914)
- Education: Limekilns Public School; Patrician Brothers' School, Bathurst
- Occupation: Engine driver; trade unionist; politician

Joseph Benedict Chifley (/ˈtʃɪfli/; 22 September 1885 – 13 June 1951) was the 16th prime minister of Australia, serving from 1945 to 1949. He held office as the leader of the Australian Labor Party (ALP), and was notable for defining Australia's post-war reconstruction efforts, enacting social and immigration reforms and advancing the nationalisation of critical industries.

Chifley was born in Bathurst, New South Wales, and joined the New South Wales Government Railways after leaving school, eventually qualifying as an engine driver. Before entering politics, he was an organiser for the Federated Union of Locomotive Employees, and was also a director of The National Advocate. After several previous unsuccessful candidacies, Chifley was elected to parliament in the 1928 federal election. In 1931, he was appointed Minister for Defence in the government of James Scullin. He served in cabinet for less than a year before losing his seat at the 1931 federal election, which saw the government suffer an electoral wipeout.

After his electoral defeat, Chifley remained involved in politics as a party official, siding with the federal Labor leadership against the Lang Labor faction. He served on a royal commission into the banking system in 1935, and in 1940 became a senior public servant in the Department of Munitions. Chifley was re-elected to parliament later that year, on his third attempt since 1931. He was appointed Treasurer in the new Curtin government in 1941, as one of the few Labor MPs with previous ministerial experience. The following year Chifley was additionally made Minister for Postwar Reconstruction, making him one of the most powerful members of the government. He became prime minister following Curtin's death in office in 1945, defeating caretaker prime minister Frank Forde in a leadership ballot.

At the 1946 Australian federal election, Chifley was re-elected with a slightly reduced majority – the first time that an incumbent Labor government had won re-election. The war had ended a month after he took office, and over the following three years his government embarked on an ambitious program of social reforms and nation-building schemes. These included the expansion of the welfare state, increased the post-war immigration to Australia, and the establishment of the Australian National University, the Australian Security Intelligence Organisation (ASIO), and the Snowy Mountains Scheme. Some of the new legislation was successfully challenged in the High Court, and as a result the constitution was amended to give the federal government extended powers over social services.

Some of Chifley's more interventionist economic policies were poorly received by Australian business, particularly an attempt to nationalise banks. His government was defeated at the 1949 Australian federal election, which brought Robert Menzies' Liberal Party to power for the first time. He stayed on as Leader of the Opposition until his death, which came a few months after the 1951 Australian federal election; Labor did not return to government until 1972. For his contributions to post-war prosperity, Chifley is often regarded as one of Australia's greatest prime ministers. He is held in particularly high regard by the Labor Party, with his "light on the hill" speech seen as seminal in both the history of the party and the broader Australian labour movement.

== Early life ==
Chifley was born at 29 Havannah Street, Bathurst, New South Wales, on 22 September 1885. He was the first of three sons born to Roman Catholic parents: Mary Anne (née Corrigan) and Patrick Chifley II. His father, a blacksmith, was born in Bathurst to Irish immigrants from County Tipperary, while his mother was born in County Fermanagh, in present-day Northern Ireland.

At the age of five, Chifley was sent to live with his widowed grandfather, Patrick Chifley I, who had a small farm at Limekilns, New South Wales, while his aunt, Mary Bridget Chifley, kept house for them. Chifley began his education at the local state school, which was known as a "half-time school" due to it being too small to offer daily classes; it shared a single teacher with a neighbouring community. He moved back to his parents' home at the age of 13, following his grandfather's death in January 1899, and attended a Patrician Brothers school for about two years. He was a voracious reader from a young age, and would later supplement his limited formal education by attending classes at night schools or mechanics' institutes.

After leaving school, Chifley's first job was as a cashier's assistant at a local department store. He later worked at a tannery for a period, and then in September 1903 joined the New South Wales Government Railways as a "shop boy" at the Bathurst locomotive shed. Over the following decade, he was promoted through the ranks to engine-cleaner and fireman, and then finally in March 1914 to engine-driver. The position of driver was considered relatively prestigious, and Chifley had to sit various examinations before being certified. He developed an intimate technical understanding of his locomotives, and became a lecturer and instructor at the Bathurst Railway Institute. Chifley drove both goods trains and passenger trains. He was based in Bathurst and worked on the Main Western railway, except for a few months in 1914 when he drove on the Main Southern railway and worked out of Harden, New South Wales.

Chifley became involved with the labour movement as a member of the Locomotive Enginemen's Association. (Note: Officially titled the New South Wales Locomotive Enginedrivers', Firemen's and Cleaners' Association, and affiliated with the Federated Railway Locomotive Enginemen's Association of Australasia at a national level.) He never held executive office, preferring to work as an organiser, but did serve as a divisional delegate to state and federal conferences. He developed a reputation for compromise, maintaining good relations with both the railway management and the more militant sections of the union. However, Chifley was one of the local leaders of the 1917 Australian general strike, and as a result was dismissed by NSWGR. He and most of the other strikers were eventually reinstated, but lost seniority and related privileges; Chifley was demoted from engine-driver to fireman. Despite repeated lobbying, their pre-1917 benefits were not restored until 1925. After the strike, the state government of William Holman also de-registered their union, placing it at a severe disadvantage against other railway unions. Chifley worked to secure its re-registration, which occurred in 1921, and was also involved in the formation of a national union – the Australian Federated Union of Locomotive Enginemen – in 1920. He appeared as an expert witness before the Commonwealth Court of Conciliation and Arbitration in 1924, which subsequently implemented a new federal industrial award for the enginemen.

=== Early political involvement ===
Chifley joined the Australian Labor Party at a young age, and was involved in state and federal election campaigns as an organizer. In 1921, he replaced his father on the board of The National Advocate, a local newspaper that functioned as the mouthpiece of the labour movement. In 1922 and 1924, Chifley unsuccessfully contested Labor preselection for the NSW Electoral district of Bathurst. He was eventually chosen as the Labor candidate for the Division of Macquarie at the 1925 Australian federal election. Macquarie was a large and diverse electorate, covering an area from Bathurst east across the Blue Mountains to Penrith, on the outskirts of Sydney; it included industrial, agricultural, and mining districts in virtually equal measure. It was one of the most marginal seats in the country, and had last been won by Labor in 1919. Lacking name recognition, Chifley lost the election to the incumbent Nationalist MP, Arthur Manning. However, he reprised his candidacy in 1928, mounting a campaign that focused on the Bruce government's unpopular labour policies. He accused the government of endangering the White Australia policy by allowing Southern European migrant workers into the country, claiming it had "allowed so many dagoes and aliens in Australia that today they are all over the country taking work which rightly belongs to all Australians". The Labor Party recorded a 6.2-point swing in Macquarie, with Chifley becoming one of three candidates in New South Wales to win seats from the government.

== Early political career ==
At the 1929 election, Chifley was re-elected on a 10.7-point swing as Labor won a landslide victory. James Scullin became the new prime minister, the fourth member of his party to hold the office. As a backbencher with little parliamentary experience, Chifley did not stand for election to the Scullin Ministry, but did join the Public Accounts Committee. As the Great Depression worsened, he defended the government's economic response against criticism from two factions within his own party – economic conservatives led by Joseph Lyons and left-wing populists led by Jack Lang. His loyalty paid off in March 1931, when the Labor caucus chose him to fill one of the vacancies in cabinet caused by the resignations of Lyons and James Fenton. Scullin appointed him Minister for Defence, a portfolio that had been disregarded somewhat in the face of more pressing concerns. There was little appetite for policy development, and Chifley instead concentrated on finding savings in his department that could be redirected to unemployment relief. He opened up unused military camps to the homeless, and also distributed surplus military clothing.

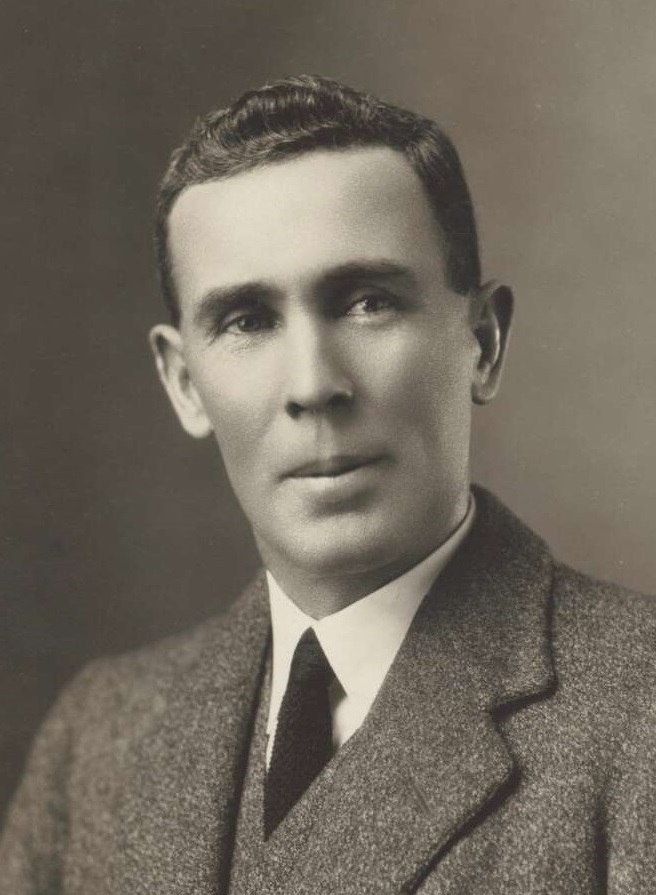
Chifley in the 1930s

Chifley was somewhat reluctant in his support of the Premiers' Plan, but believed there was no better alternative and felt bound by the principle of cabinet solidarity. His endorsement of the plan, which required cuts to wages and pensions, was received poorly in his own constituency. Many in the local labour movement defected to Lang Labor, which opposed the plan, and his own union expelled him in August 1931. Joseph Lyons reportedly offered Chifley the treasurership as an inducement to join the new United Australia Party (UAP); Chifley declined and remained a member of the Labor Party. At the 1931 election, Chifley suffered a negative swing of 16.2 points in Macquarie, losing his seat to John Lawson, the UAP candidate, by just 456 votes on the final count. The Labor Party was reduced to 14 seats out of 75 in the House of Representatives, with five other ministers (including Treasurer Ted Theodore) and future prime minister John Curtin also losing their seats.

=== Wilderness years ===
During the Great Depression, with no parliamentary salary and no chance of returning to the railway, Chifley survived on his wife's family's money and his part-ownership of the Bathurst newspaper The National Advocate.

In 1938, Chifley and most other Labor supporters in Bathurst joined the Industrial Labor Party (ILP), a breakaway organisation formed by Bob Heffron and dedicated to thwarting the Lang Labor faction that controlled the ALP in New South Wales. He was a delegate to the party's annual conference in Sydney in April 1939. After a unity conference in August 1939, the ILP members rejoined the ALP and ended Jack Lang's dominance. Chifley was subsequently elected to the ALP state executive.

In 1935 the Lyons government appointed Chifley as a member of the Royal Commission on Banking, a subject on which he had become an expert. He submitted a minority report advocating that the private banks be nationalised. After an unsuccessful effort to win back Macquarie at the 1934 Australian federal election, Chifley finally won his seat back at the 1940 Australian federal election on a swing of ten percent.

=== Curtin government ===
Chifley was appointed Treasurer of Australia when the Labor leader, John Curtin, formed a mid-term Labor government in 1941 following the collapse of the first Menzies government. Although deputy Labor leader Frank Forde was nominally the deputy in the government, Chifley became the minister Curtin most relied on, controlling most domestic policy while Curtin was preoccupied with the Second World War. Of highest importance was war funding, followed by the strong desire to control inflation. In February 1942, he announced the pegging of wages and profits, the introduction of controls on production, trade and consumption to reduce private spending, and the transfer of surplus personal income to savings and war loans. On 15 April 1942, more price controls were introduced. On 23 July, a uniform income tax was attained when the States were defeated in the High Court of Australia.

The Australian Dictionary of Biography claims Chifley proved himself to be his country's greatest treasurer – fiscally responsible, able to transmit the necessity for a reasonable equality of sacrifice, and capable of managing a wartime economy of complexity and difficulty. Financing the war by increased taxation, loans from the Australian public, and central bank credit, he ensured that the nation did not become burdened with overseas debt, as it had been after First World War. Every budget was accompanied by his strictures on 'vigorous self-denial', labour discipline and restriction of consumer demand with the aim of controlling a huge accumulation of purchasing power.

== Prime minister ==
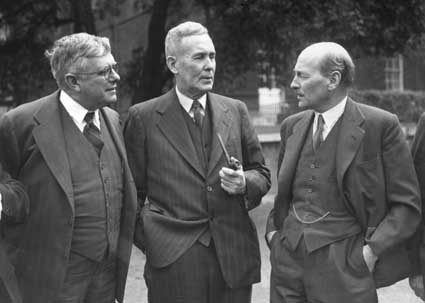
Chifley (middle) and Bert Evatt (left) with Clement Attlee (right) at the Dominion and British Leaders Conference, London, 1946

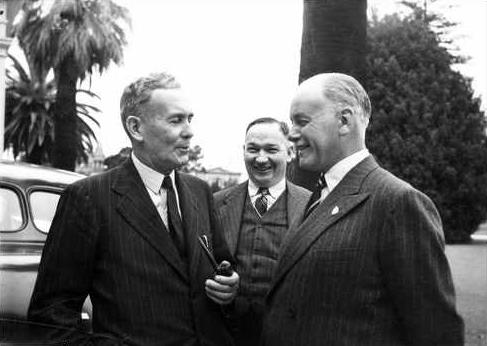
Chifley (left) meets with Premier of South Australia Tom Playford (centre) and Governor of South Australia Sir Willoughby Norrie (right) in 1946

Following the death of Curtin in July 1945, Forde became prime minister since he was the ALP deputy leader. In the ensuing leadership ballot, Chifley defeated Forde to replace him as prime minister and Curtin as leader of the ALP. Once the war ended in September, normal political life resumed, and Chifley faced Robert Menzies and his new Liberal Party in the 1946 election, which Chifley won with 54 percent of the two-party-preferred vote. It marked the first time that an incumbent full-term federal Labor government was re-elected. In the post-war years, Chifley maintained wartime economic controls, including the highly unpopular petrol rationing. He did this partly to help Britain in its postwar economic difficulties.

Upon becoming prime minister, Chifley continued as Treasurer and remained so for the entirety of his prime ministership. To date, Chifley is the last prime minister to have been his own Treasurer for a period that was not transitionary, as happened in 1972 and 1991 with Gough Whitlam and Bob Hawke respectively.

Chifley was also the longest-serving Labor Treasurer until this record was broken by Paul Keating in 1991 and Keating, like Chifley, would become prime minister.

=== Legislative achievements ===
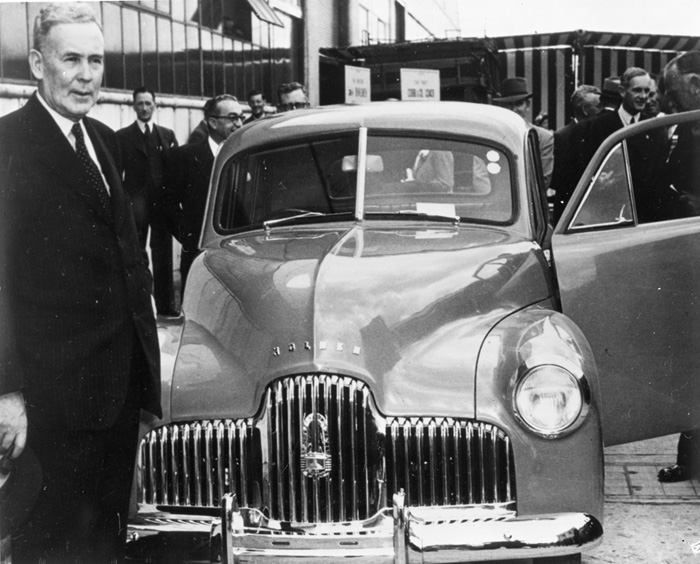
Chifley at the launching of the Holden 48-215 (Australia's first Made Car) on 29 November 1948

Feeling secure in an unprecedented position, Chifley looked toward the Labor platform objective of social democracy and democratic socialism. According to a biographer of Chifley, his government embarked upon greater intervention in "economic and social affairs", with policies directed towards better workplace conditions, full employment, and the "equalisation of wealth, income and opportunity". Chifley was successful in steering the economy into peacetime, and undertook a number of social welfare initiatives, as characterised by fairer pensions and unemployment and sickness benefits, the construction of new universities, technical colleges, and 200,000 houses.

Between 1946 and 1949, Parliament passed a record 299 acts under Chifley's government. Among other measures, the Chifley government passed legislation to establish universal health care modelled on the British National Health Service, including a free formulary of essential medicines. This was successfully opposed as unconstitutional in the High Court of Australia by the Australian branches of the British Medical Association, who were the precursors of the Australian Medical Association, in the First Pharmaceutical Benefits case. One of the few successful referendums to modify the Australian Constitution, the 1946 Social Services referendum, made possible many of the Chifley government's other legislative initiatives in social welfare and social provision and permitted federal legislation over pharmaceutical benefits and medical and dental services. It also authorised federal legislation with respect to pensions, benefits, and allowances.

The following year, in 1947, specific racial disqualifications other than those referring to Aboriginal Australians were removed, while the Wife's Allowance became payable to de facto wives who had lived with the pensioner for at least three years. The subsequent federal legislation in relation to pharmaceutical benefits was deemed constitutional by the High Court. This paved the way for the introduction of the Pharmaceutical Benefits Scheme (PBS), an important component of Australia's modern public health system.

Moreover, eligibility for maternity benefits was extended to mothers who were classified as an alien but had lived in Australia for 12 months residence. Amendments were also made to legislation on Child Endowment to allow Australians temporarily absent from Australia and newly arrived migrants to receive the benefit. The Social Services Consolidation Act 1947 expanded eligibility for social security benefits.

Chifley's government oversaw the creation of the Commonwealth Employment Service, the introduction of federal funds to the States for public housing construction and the Acoustic Laboratories Act 1948, which established the Commonwealth Acoustic Laboratories to undertake scientific investigations into hearing loss. Although it failed in its attempts to establish a national health service, the Chifley government was successful in making arrangements with the states to upgrade the quality and availability of hospital treatment. The Mental Institutions Benefits Act 1948 introduced federal funding for mental health care. The achievements of the Labor governments of Chifley and Curtin in expanding Australia's social welfare services were brought together under the Social Services Consolidation Act 1947, which consolidated the various social services benefits, liberalised some existing social security provisions, and increased the rates of various benefits.

Among the government's other legislative achievements included the establishment of a separate Australian citizenship in 1948 and the founding of ASIO. Science and education was also expanded, with a reorganisation and enlargement of the CSIRO, alongside passing the Australian National University Act which provided post-graduate facilities in Australia and augmented the supply of staff for universities. The Commonwealth Reconstruction Training Scheme expanded access to university education for ex-servicemen. This was alongside annual grants to universities to provide the necessary staff and accommodation for the influx of assisted students and ex-servicemen. Returned servicemen received financial assistance, vocational training and employment benefits.

In July 1948, the Dairy Industry Fund was created with the purpose of stabilising returns from exports, and further financial grants to the States were introduced to assist them in expanding their agricultural activities. The establishment of a Coal Industry Tribunal and a Joint Coal Board in 1946 also brought significant gains for miners; and life insurance came to be comprehensively regulated.

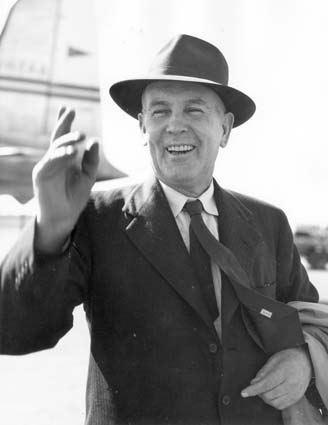
Chifley in the 1940s

=== Later controversial actions ===
In 1947, Chifley announced the government would initiate a nationalisation of the banks. This provoked massive opposition from the press, and middle-class opinion turned against Labor. The High Court found Chifley's legislation to be unconstitutional. The government appealed the decision in the Privy Council, but it upheld the High Court's decision.

However, Chifley's government did succeed in passing the Banking Act 1945 and the Commonwealth Bank Act 1945 which gave the government control over monetary policy and established the Commonwealth Bank as Australia's national bank.

During the 1948 Queensland railway strike, Chifley barred striking workers from being eligible for unemployment benefits. A prolonged and bitter strike in the coal industry began in June 1949 and caused unemployment and hardship. Chifley saw the strike as a move by the Communist Party to challenge Labor's place as the party of the working class, and he sent in 13,000 army troops to break the strike. Early on in the strike, Chifley and H. V. Evatt froze Miner's Federation funds and "introduced legislation aimed at starving the workers back to work".

In 1949 in the House of Representatives, Chifley stated that the Labor Party was a "bulwark against communism", and that the most effective way of weakening the strength of the Communist Party was "improving the conditions of the people". Despite this, Menzies exploited the rising Cold War hysteria to portray Labor as soft on Communism. These events, together with a perception that Chifley and Labor had grown increasingly arrogant in office, led to the Liberal election victory at the 1949 election. While Labor won an additional four seats in a House of Representatives that had been expanded from 74 seats to 121 seats, Menzies and the Coalition won an additional 48. Labor retained a Senate majority however.

== Opposition ==
Chifley was now aged 64 and in poor health (like Curtin, he was a lifelong smoker), but he refused to retire from politics. Though out of government, having retained a Senate majority, Chifley continued as Labor leader and became Leader of the Opposition. The opposition Senate majority would frequently ensure the passing of Labor amendments, or outright blocking, of Menzies Government legislation.

Menzies responded by introducing a bill to ban the Communist Party of Australia in 1950. He expected Chifley to reject it and give him an excuse to call a double dissolution election. Menzies apparently hoped to repeat his "soft-on-Communism" theme to win a majority in both chambers. However, Chifley let the bill pass after a redraft (it was ultimately thrown out by the High Court).

However, when Chifley rejected Menzies' Commonwealth Banking Bill a few months later, Menzies called a double dissolution election for April 1951. Although Chifley managed to lead Labor to a five-seat swing in the House, Labor lost six seats in the Senate, giving the Coalition control of both chambers.

== Death ==
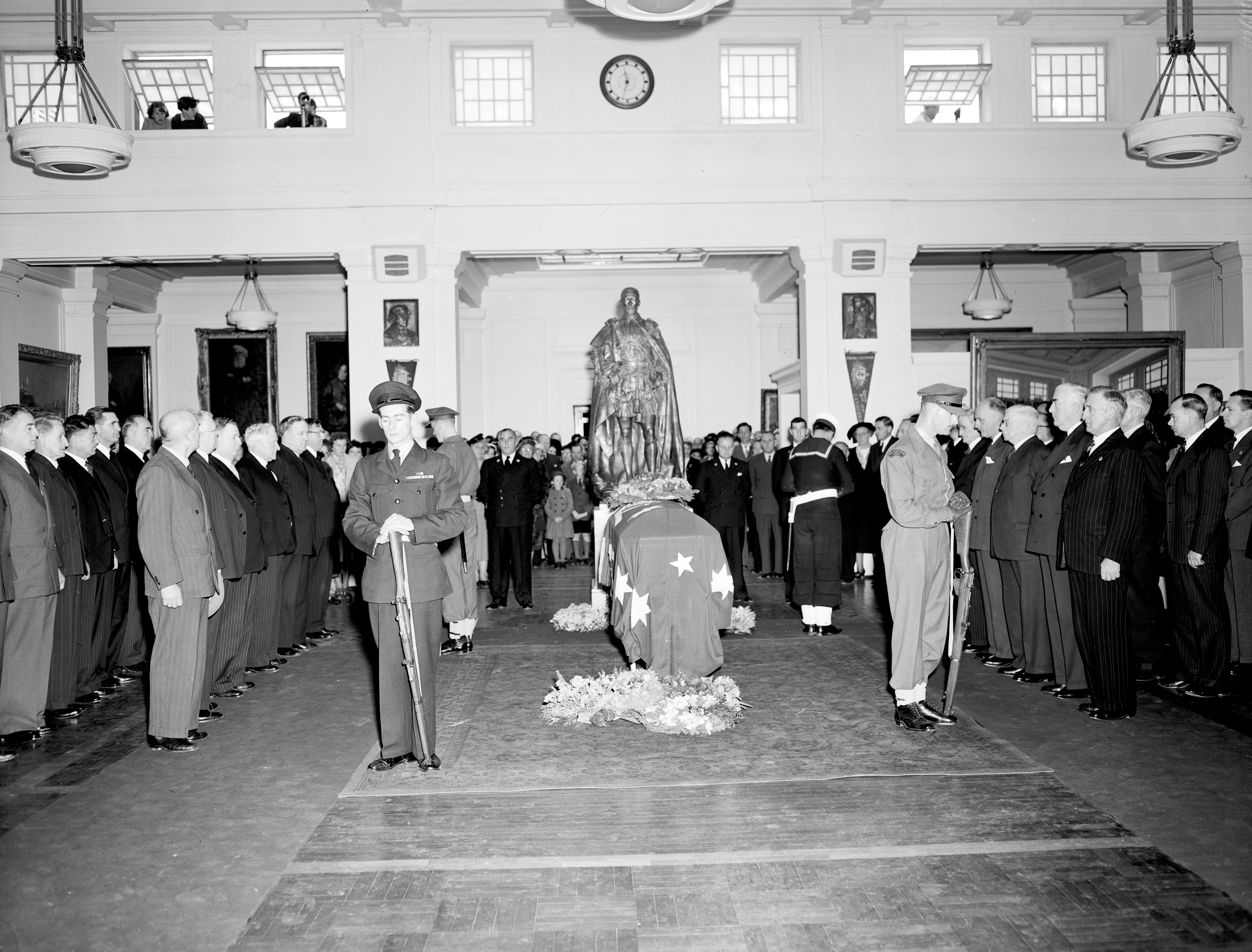
Chifley lying in state in Old Parliament House, June 1951

A few weeks later on 13 June 1951, Chifley suffered a heart attack in his room at the Hotel Kurrajong in Canberra.

Chifley at first made light of the sudden chest pains and attempted to dissuade his secretary and confidante, Phyllis Donnelly, who was making him a cup of tea, from calling a doctor. As his condition deteriorated, however, Donnelly called Dr. John Holt, who ordered Chifley's immediate removal to hospital. Chifley died in an ambulance on the way to the Canberra Community Hospital. He was pronounced dead at 10:45 pm.

Menzies heard of Chifley's demise while attending a parliamentary ball at King's Hall in Parliament House to celebrate the 50th Jubilee of Federation (Chifley was invited but had declined to attend). Menzies was deeply distressed and abandoned his normally impassive demeanour to announce in a halting subdued voice:

It is my very sorrowful duty during this celebration tonight to tell you that Mr Chifley has died. I don't want to try to talk about him now because, although we were political opponents, he was a friend of mine and yours, and a fine Australian. You will all agree that in the circumstances the festivities should end. It doesn't matter about party politics on an occasion such as this. Oddly enough, in Parliament we get on very well. We sometimes find we have the warmest friendships among people whose politics are not ours. Mr Chifley served this country magnificently for years.

Chifley was buried at the Bathurst cemetery on 18 June 1951.

== Personal life ==
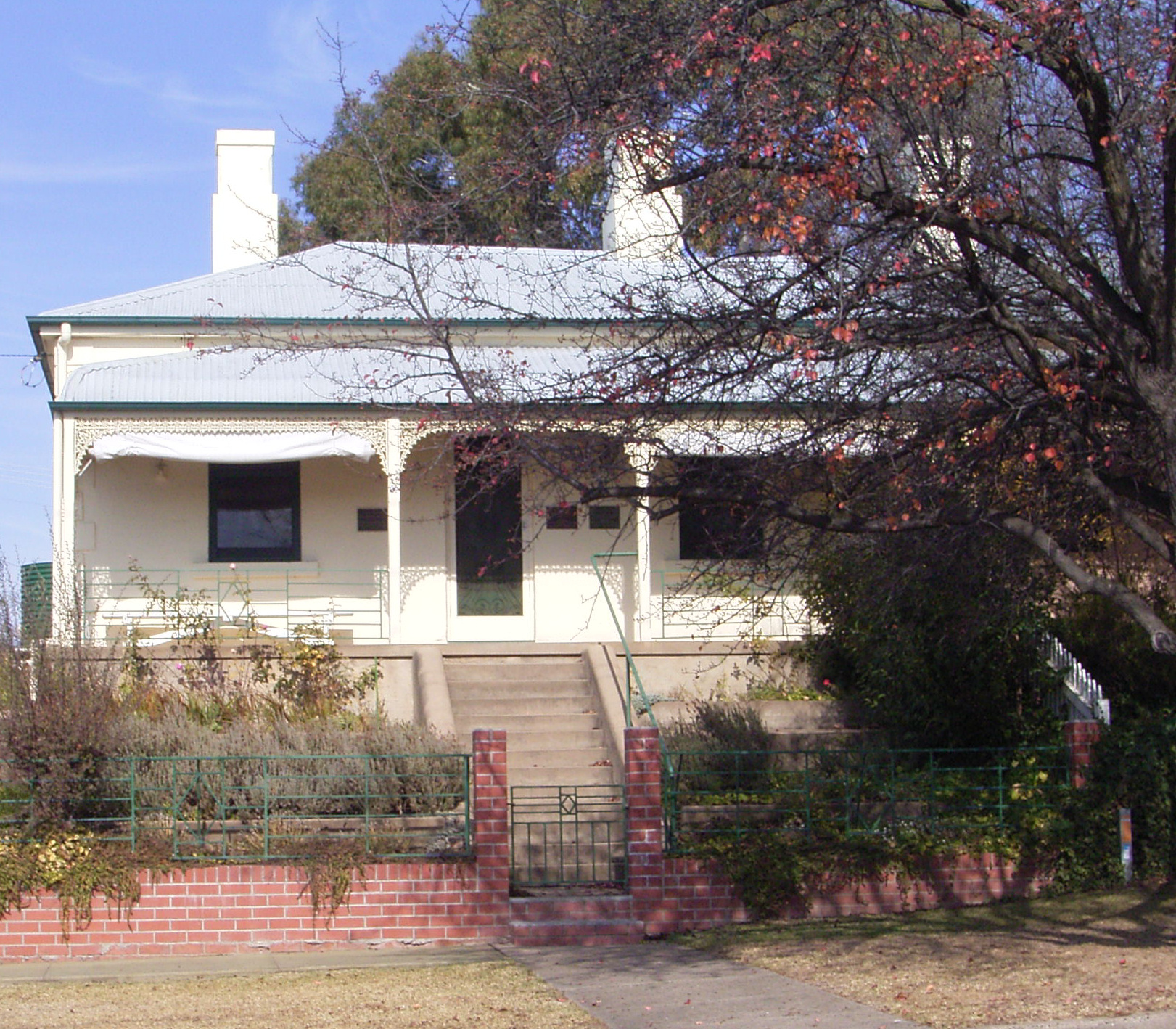
Ben Chifley's House at 10 Busby Street, Bathurst, now a heritage site and house museum

Chifley married Elizabeth McKenzie (known as "Lizzie") on 6 June 1914. She was the daughter of a more senior railways employee, George McKenzie. The couple began courting in 1912, but had known each other since childhood. The McKenzies were Presbyterian, and Elizabeth did not want to convert to Chifley's Catholic faith. Due to the Catholic Church's opposition to mixed marriages, the couple chose to marry in a Presbyterian church in Glebe, Sydney. Their parents opposed the union and did not attend the ceremony, but they and their families were eventually reconciled. The McKenzies were relatively wealthy, and Chifley was seen as "marrying into money, or as much money as he could hope to marry into in the context of the relatively class-bound society of Bathurst".

After their marriage, Chifley's father-in-law gave the couple a house on Busby Street, Bathurst, which they would occupy for the rest of their respective lives. It is now listed on the New South Wales State Heritage Register as "Ben Chifley's House", and has operated as a house museum since 1973. Chifley and his wife had no children. She suffered a "serious health problem", probably a miscarriage, in about 1915, and later developed chronic back pain that restricted her mobility. The couple lived mostly separate lives, initially because of her husband's work on the railways and later because of his political career. She rarely travelled outside Bathurst and never lived in Canberra, even while her husband was prime minister. She usually visited the city for only special occasions. Her health prevented her from campaigning for her husband, and she was known to have little interest in politics. Nonetheless, the couple "seemingly enjoyed a close and caring relationship throughout his life". She survived her husband by 11 years, dying in 1962.

According to his biographer David Day, Chifley engaged in a long-running extramarital affair with his private secretary Phyllis Donnelly. Day believed that their relationship began shortly after Chifley was elected in parliament in 1928, and continued more or less uninterrupted until his death in 1951; she was present in his room at the Hotel Kurrajong when he suffered his final heart attack. She stayed at the same hotel, and they were known to spend their free time with each other while in Canberra. She also accompanied him on many of his travels. According to Frank Slavin, Chifley's campaign manager at the 1940 election, his wife was aware of the relationship and tolerated it. Day also speculated that Chifley may have had a similar relationship with Phyllis's older sister Nell. He assisted her financially in the 1930s, including buying her a house in Bathurst. Day based his conclusions on interviews conducted with the Donnelly family and other Bathurst residents who had known Chifley. His claims have been disputed by members of the Chifley family, and some reviewers of his book felt there was insufficient evidence to conclude that Chifley's relationship with either of the Donnelly sisters was sexual in nature. (Note: Those who have expressed doubts about Day's conclusions include Geoffrey Bolton, Bob Ellis, and Gerard Henderson.)

== Legacy ==
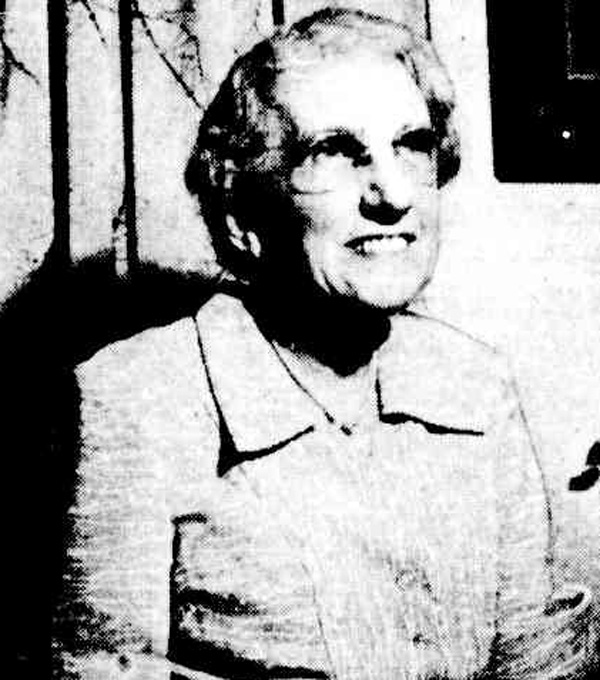
Mrs Elizabeth Chifley, wife of Ben Chifley

In 1987 the New South Wales Labor government decided to name the planned new university in Sydney's western suburbs Chifley University. Controversy broke out when, in 1989, a new Liberal government renamed it the University of Western Sydney. According to a debate on the topic, held after the Labor Party had regained government, the decision to rename Chifley University reflected a desire to attach the name of Western Sydney to institutions of lasting significance, and that idea ultimately received the support of Bob Carr, later the Premier of New South Wales.

== Honours ==
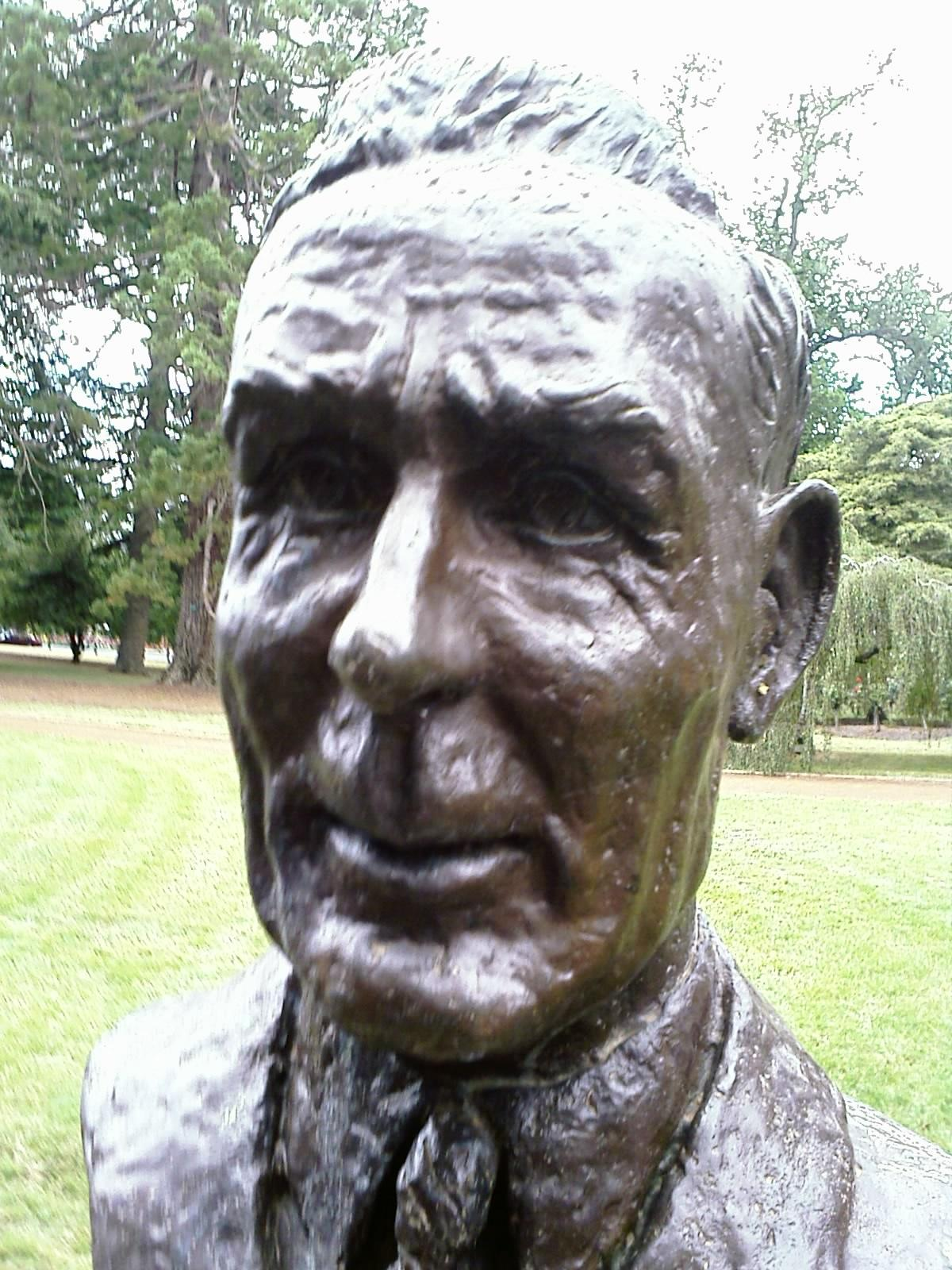
Bust of Prime Minister of Australia from 1945 to 1949 Ben Chifley by sculptor Ken Palmer located in the Prime Minister's Avenue in the Ballarat Botanical Gardens

Places and institutions that have been named after Chifley include:

- the suburb of Chifley in Canberra
- the suburb of Chifley in Sydney
- the Division of Chifley, a federal electorate
- his former house in Bathurst, now the Chifley Home and Education Centre, listed on the NSW State Heritage Register
- Chifley Library, the main library of the Australian National University, Canberra
- Chifley Tower and Chifley Square in Sydney
- Chifley Cave (formerly the Left Imperial Cave), one of the Jenolan Caves in the Blue Mountains, New South Wales
- several public high schools in Western Sydney are now known as Chifley College.
- a grouping of dormitories at the Bathurst campus of Charles Sturt University are collectively named as Chifley Halls
- Chifley Research Centre the official think tank of the Australian Labor Party is named in honour of Ben Chifley
- Chifley dam About 17 km (11 mi) upstream of Bathurst.

In 1975 he was honoured on a postage stamp bearing his portrait issued by Australia Post.

One of the locomotives driven by Chifley, 5112, is preserved on a plinth at the eastern end of Bathurst railway station. In 1971 Commonwealth Railways named diesel locomotive NJ1 that was assembled at the Clyde Engineering factory in Kelso, Ben Chifley.

== In popular culture ==
Chifley was portrayed by Bill Hunter in the 1984 TV miniseries The Last Bastion, by Ed Devereaux in the 1988 miniseries True Believers, and Geoff Morrell in the 2007 film Curtin.

== See also ==
- Chifley government
- First Chifley Ministry
- Second Chifley Ministry
- 1949 Australian coal strike
- The light on the hill

== Bibliography ==
- Chifley, Ben (1952), Things Worth Fighting For (collected speeches), Melbourne University Press, Parkville, Victoria.
- Crisp, LF (1961). Ben Chifley: A Political Biography. Melbourne, Victoria: Longman, Green and Co.
- Day, David (2001). Chifley. HarperCollins. ISBN 9780732267025.
- Duncan, Bruce. Crusade or conspiracy?: Catholics and the anti-communist struggle in Australia, UNSW Press, 2001, ISBN 0-86840-731-3
- Hughes, Colin A (1976), Mr Prime Minister. Australian Prime Ministers 1901–1972, Oxford University Press, Melbourne, Victoria, Ch.17. ISBN 0-19-550471-2
- Makin, Norman (1961), Federal Labour Leaders, Union Printing, Sydney, New South Wales, Pages 122–131.
- Waterson, Duncan B. (1993). "Ben Chifley (1885–1951)". Australian Dictionary of Biography. National Centre of Biography, Australian National University. ISBN 978-0-522-84459-7. ISSN 1833-7538. OCLC 70677943.

Parliament of Australia
Preceded by Arthur Manning	Member for Macquarie; 1928–1931	Succeeded by John Lawson
Preceded by John Lawson	Member for Macquarie; 1940–1951	Succeeded by Tony Luchetti
Political offices
Preceded by John Daly	Minister for Defence; 1931–1932	Succeeded by George Pearce
Preceded by Arthur Fadden	Treasurer of Australia; 1941–1949	Succeeded by Sir Arthur Fadden
New title	Minister for Post-War Reconstruction; 1942–1945	Succeeded by John Dedman
Preceded by Frank Forde	Prime Minister of Australia; 1945–1949	Succeeded by Robert Menzies
Preceded by Robert Menzies	Leader of the Opposition of Australia; 1950–1951	Succeeded by H. V. Evatt
Party political offices
Preceded by John Curtin	Leader of the Australian Labor Party; 1945–1951	Succeeded by H. V. Evatt
