= The light on the hill =

1949 Australian political speech

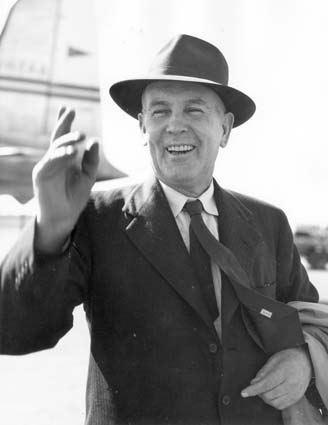
Ben Chifley in 1949

"The light on the hill" is a phrase used to describe the objective of the Australian Labor Party. The phrase, which was used in a 1949 conference speech at the Sydney Trades Hall by then Prime Minister Ben Chifley, has biblical origins. 'City upon a Hill' is a metaphor from the Salt and Light section of Jesus' Sermon on the Mount in the Gospel of Matthew.

The speech, delivered near the end of Chifley's term as prime minister, pays tribute to the people who make up Australia's labour movement.

== Text ==
"I have had the privilege of leading the Labor Party for nearly four years. They have not been easy times and it has not been an easy job. It is a man-killing job and would be impossible if it were not for the help of my colleagues and members of the movement.

No Labor Minister or leader ever has an easy job. The urgency that rests behind the Labor movement, pushing it on to do things, to create new conditions, to reorganise the economy of the country, always means that the people who work within the Labor movement, people who lead, can never have an easy job. The job of the evangelist is never easy.

Because of the turn of fortune's wheel your Premier (Mr McGirr) and I have gained some prominence in the Labor movement. But the strength of the movement cannot come from us. We may make plans and pass legislation to help and direct the economy of the country. But the job of getting the things the people of the country want comes from the roots of the Labor movement – the people who support it.

When I sat at a Labor meeting in the country with only ten or fifteen men there, I found a man sitting beside me who had been working in the Labor movement for 54 years. I have no doubt that many of you have been doing the same, not hoping for any advantage from the movement, not hoping for any personal gain, but because you believe in a movement that has been built up to bring better conditions to the people. Therefore, the success of the Labor Party at the next elections depends entirely, as it always has done, on the people who work.

I try to think of the Labor movement, not as putting an extra sixpence into somebody's pocket, or making somebody Prime Minister or Premier, but as a movement bringing something better to the people, better standards of living, greater happiness to the mass of the people. We have a great objective – the light on the hill – which we aim to reach by working the betterment of mankind not only here but anywhere we may give a helping hand. If it were not for that, the Labor movement would not be worth fighting for.

If the movement can make someone more comfortable, give to some father or mother a greater feeling of security for their children, a feeling that if a depression comes there will be work, that the government is striving its hardest to do its best, then the Labor movement will be completely justified.

It does not matter about persons like me who have our limitations. I only hope that the generosity, kindliness and friendliness shown to me by thousands of my colleagues in the Labor movement will continue to be given to the movement and add zest to its work."

== Cultural impact ==
"The light on the hill" is often referenced in Australian popular culture. Notable instances include:

- "The Light On The Hill" from the musical Keating! is a country-influenced ballad in which Keating laments the trends in the 1996 election, concludes that he is doomed electorally, and sings of his unachieved dreams and with some bitterness at what he sees as the backward-looking message of his opponent.
- "Neighborhood Watch" from My Friend the Chocolate Cake's self-titled first album refers to the light on the hill as a dream that is no longer even dreamt.
- "We Remember the light on the hill" from Midnight Oil's song "River Runs Red" on the album Blue Sky Mining is a reference to the statement made by Prime Minister Chifley.
- Greens MP Adam Bandt referenced the light on the hill in his post-election speech in 2010, stating "there is a new light on the hill and it's powered by renewable energy".
- A 2011 cartoon by Jon Kudelka depicted current Labor Prime Minister Julia Gillard turning off the light on the hill, because it was "attracting the boats", a reference to the highly politicised topic of boat arrivals from asylum seekers.

== See also ==
- "The Forgotten People"
