= Limekilns, New South Wales =

Limekilns New South Wales
- Coordinates: 33.2764399°S 149.7376513°E
- Population: 111 (2016 census)
- Postcode(s): 2795
- LGA(s): Bathurst Regional Council
- State electorate(s): Bathurst
- Federal division(s): Calare

Limekilns is a rural locality in the Central West region of New South Wales. The closest major town is Bathurst, and the local government area is the Bathurst Regional Council. Limekilns had a population of 111 people at the time of the 2016 Australian census.

Ben Chifley, the Prime Minister of Australia from 1945 to 1949, lived with his grandfather in Limekilns between the ages of five and thirteen. Another notable resident was Daniel Clyne, a Speaker of the New South Wales Legislative Assembly.

A book about the area, written by Col Ferguson and titled The History of Limekilns, was published in 2017.
