= David Day (historian) =

20th and 21st-century Australian historian

- Born: David Andrew Day; Melbourne, Australia
- Awards: South Australian Festival Award for Non-Fiction (1998); Queensland Premier's History Book Award (2000); Fellow of the Academy of the Social Sciences in Australia (2004)

Academic background
- Education: University of Melbourne (BA [Hons]); University of Cambridge (PhD)

Academic work
- Institutions: La Trobe University; University College Dublin; Bond University
- Main interests: Australian political history
- Website: www.davidday.com.au

David Andrew Day is an Australian historian, academic, and author. He is known for his many historical works of non-fiction, including several biographies of former Australian prime ministers and other works on Australian political history.

== Early life and education ==
David Andrew Day was born in Melbourne, Victoria. The son of a weather forecaster with Australia's Bureau of Meteorology, he grew up in Melbourne and Charleville, Queensland.

He commenced accounting studies, in which he performed poorly owing to his political activity, which included protesting against Australia's involvement in the Vietnam War.

After a short period of work, Day returned to his studies and graduated with first-class honours in history and political science from the University of Melbourne. He was later awarded a PhD from the University of Cambridge.

== Career ==
=== Academia ===
Day has been official historian of the Australian Customs Service and the Bureau of Meteorology, Keith Cameron Professor of Australian History at University College Dublin, professor of Australian studies at the University of Tokyo, an Australian Research Council senior research fellow in the history program at La Trobe University and the Archives By-Fellow at Churchill College at Cambridge University. As of 2012 he was an honorary associate in the history program at La Trobe University in Melbourne.

=== Writing ===
Day has written widely on Australian history and the history of the Second World War. Among his many books are Menzies and Churchill at War (about Australian prime minister Robert Menzies and British prime minister Winston Churchill during the Second World War) and a two-volume study of Anglo-Australian relations during the Second World War.

== Awards ==
- 1992?: Smugglers and Sailors, shortlisted by the Fellowship of Australian Writers for its Book of the Year Award
- 1998: Claiming a Continent, winner, Non-Fiction Award, South Australian Festival Awards for Literature
- 2000: John Curtin: A Life, shortlisted, Douglas Stewart Prize for Non-Fiction in the New South Wales Premier's Literary Awards
- 2000: John Curtin: A Life, winner, Queensland Premier's History Book Award

== Published works ==
- Menzies & Churchill at war: a controversial new account of the 1941 struggle for power. Sydney: Angus & Robertson. 1986. p. 271. ISBN 0-207-15169-5.
- The Great Betrayal: Britain, Australia and the Onset of the Pacific War, 1939–42. Sydney: Angus & Robertson. 1988. p. 388. ISBN 0-207-15328-0.
- Reluctant Nation: Australia and the Allied Defeat of Japan, 1942–45. Melbourne: Oxford University Press. 1992. p. 370. ISBN 0-19-553453-0.
- Smugglers and Sailors: The Customs History of Australia, 1788–1901. Canberra: Australian Government Publishing Service Press. 1992. p. 528. ISBN 0-644-24751-7.
- Contraband and Controversy: The Customs History of Australia from 1901. Canberra: Australian Government Publishing Service Press. 1996. p. 558. ISBN 0-644-33151-8.
- Brave new world: Dr. H.V. Evatt and Australian foreign policy 1941–1949. St Lucia, Queensland: University of Queensland Press. 1996. p. 182. ISBN 0-7022-2608-4.
- Claiming a Continent: A New History of Australia. Sydney: Angus & Robertson. 1996. p. 488. ISBN 0-207-19670-2.
- John Curtin: A Life. Sydney: HarperCollins. 1999. p. 610. ISBN 0-207-19669-9.
- Chifley. Sydney: HarperCollins. 2001. p. 562. ISBN 0-7322-6702-1.
- The Politics of War. Sydney: HarperCollins. 2003. p. 750. ISBN 0-7322-7333-1. Completely revised and updated edition bringing together two earlier works: The Great Betrayal and Reluctant Nation.
- Conquest: A New History of the Modern World. Sydney: HarperCollins. 2005. p. 370. ISBN 0-7322-7765-5.
- The Weather Watchers: 100 years of the Bureau of Meteorology. Carlton: Melbourne University Publishing. 2007. p. 530. ISBN 978-0-522-85275-2.
- Conquest: how societies overwhelm others. New York: Oxford University Press. 2008. pp. 288. ISBN 978-0-19-534011-2.
- Andrew Fisher: Prime Minister of Australia. London: Fourth Estate. 2008. p. 496. ISBN 978-0-7322-7610-2.
- Flaws in the ice: In search of Douglas Mawson. Melbourne: Scribe. 2013. p. 316. ISBN 978-1-9220-7074-6.
- The Story of a Prime Minister: Paul Keating, a Biography. Sydney: HarperCollins Australia. pp. 576. ISBN 978-0-7322-8425-1.
- Maurice Blackburn: Champion of the People. Melbourne: Scribe. 2019. ISBN 978-1-925713-78-7.
