= Elizabeth Chifley =

Wife of Australian Prime Minister (1886-1962)

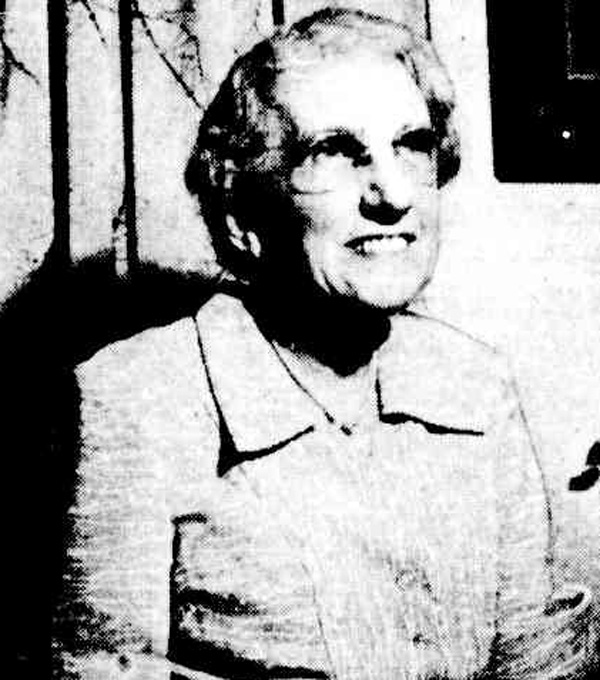
- Elizabeth Chifley in 1954

Spouse of the Prime Minister of Australia
- In role 13 July 1945 – 19 December 1949
- Preceded by: Vera Forde
- Succeeded by: Dame Pattie Menzies

Personal details
- Born: Elizabeth Gibson McKenzie; 1 August 1886 Bathurst, New South Wales
- Died: 9 September 1962 (aged 76) Bathurst, New South Wales, Australia
- Spouse: Ben Chifley (m. 1914; died 1951)

Elizabeth Gibson Chifley (née McKenzie; 1 August 1886 – 9 September 1962) was the wife of Ben Chifley, the Prime Minister of Australia from 1945 to 1949.

Chifley was born in Bathurst, New South Wales, to George and Isabella McKenzie. She was the elder of their two daughters, Lizzie and Annie. The family was moderately well-off, Scottish and Presbyterian. She was active in local civic organisations and the church, but does not appear to have been active or interested in the labour movement or politics.

She and Ben Chifley, an engine driver like her father, had known each other since their youth, but their romance did not commence until 1912 when they were both in their late twenties. Their relationship began at a dance although Ben did not like dancing. In those days, Elizabeth was considered 'a good catch'. Her family was relatively wealthy, she played the symbol of respectability, the piano, she was skilled in the domestic arts of cooking and sewing, she was suitably religious and still had a great sense of fun. Ben was like Elizabeth's father, serious, dependable, civic-minded and a man of growing stature. Ben was determined to marry her and this they did on 6 June 1914 at the Presbyterian Church in Glebe, Sydney. Chifley was a Catholic, and to marry Elizabeth (a Presbyterian), he defied the Ne Temere papal decree issued several years earlier, which forbade Catholics to marry outside of their church. Ben was reported to have said "One of us has to take the knock" and "It had better be me". By travelling to Sydney for the ceremony they sought to avoid as much antagonism as possible. Following their marriage, each continued to attend their own church and Ben was said to be always conscious of his lapse from Catholic precepts.

The Chifleys' wedding present from her parents was tenancy of a house at 10 Busby Street, Bathurst which was owned by her parents. In 1920, the parents gave the house to the couple, and they would spend the rest of their lives there.

In 1915, Elizabeth had a miscarriage, which left her unable to have children, and she was in poor health for the rest of her life. She also suffered from the spinal disease scoliosis, which left her physically frail, and limited her mobility. After Ben Chifley was elected to the House of Representatives in 1928, Elizabeth rarely travelled to Canberra, Sydney or other locations where her husband's political duties summoned him. On several occasions during Chifley's premiership, Elizabeth did act as a hostess at The Lodge, although Chifley more often stayed at the Hotel Kurrajong when in Canberra. It was at the hotel where Ben Chifley suffered a fatal heart attack in 1951, predeceasing his wife by eleven years.

Elizabeth Chifley died at her Busby Street home on 9 September 1962. She left much of her estate to the Presbyterian Church, including a bequest to build a preschool named after her.

Honorary titles
Preceded by Veronica Forde	Spouse of the Prime Minister of Australia; 13 July 1945 – 19 December 1949	Succeeded by Pattie Menzies
