= Bottom Points railway station =

Railway station in New South Wales, Australia

Bottom Points
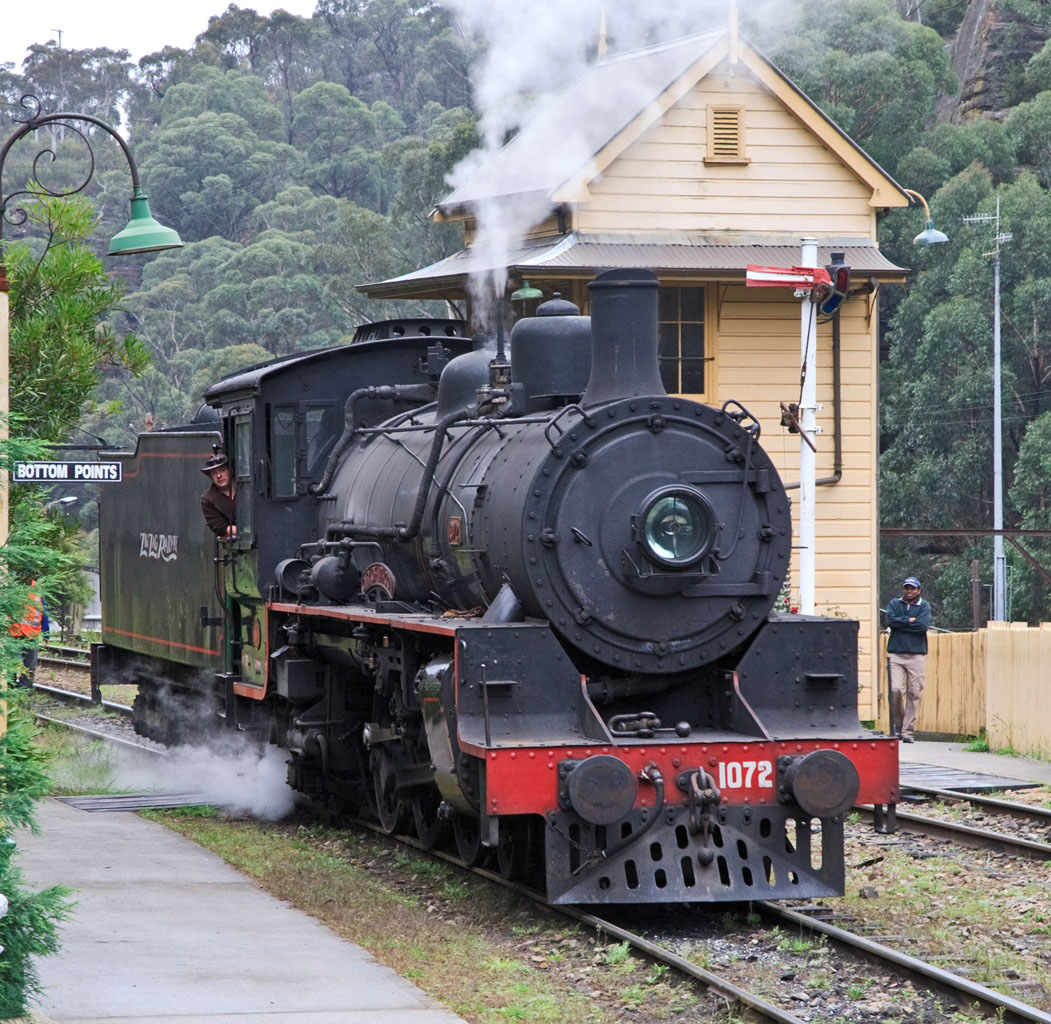
- 1072 at Bottom Points in April 2010

General information
- Location: Lithgow; Australia
- Elevation: 937 metres (3,074 ft)
- Line: Zig Zag Railway
- Platforms: 1
- Tracks: 2

Construction
- Structure type: Ground

Other information
- Website: Bottom Points

History
- Opened: 18 October 1975

Services
Preceding station	Zig Zag Railway	Following station
Terminus	Zig Zag Railway	Top Points towards Clarence
Location

Bottom Points is a railway station on the Zig Zag Railway (heritage railway) in the Blue Mountains area of New South Wales.

It is situated at the reversal point of the Lower and Middle Roads of the Lithgow Zig Zag.

When the Zig Zag Railway reopened in October 1975, Bottom Points was a terminal station on the line. It has a water crane at one end to replenish locomotives. The signal box was built in 1910 when the Ten Tunnels line opened, and was later relocated.

It is a five-minute walk from Zig Zag station on the Blue Mountains Line.
