= Dargans Deviation =

Section of the original Main Western railway line

The Dargans Deviation was a section of the original Main Western railway line over the Blue Mountains in New South Wales, Australia. It was constructed from 1896 to 1897 in an effort to ease the grades of the original alignment (1 in 33) from before Newnes Junction to Clarence, with a ruling grade of 1 in 60. Along with a few crossing loops, it enabled much longer trains to use the line. After the construction of the Ten Tunnels Deviation, it was abandoned.

== History ==
The deviation started construction around July 1896 due to a sudden rise in traffic along the Western Line. It was longer than the original alignment, but it eased the grades to 1 in 60 and stretched three miles from Newnes Junction to Clarence. During construction, when the line rejoined the original alignment at Clarence, a number of changes had to be made. The original up platform was removed, and a new platform was erected a few hundred meters west. This platform is currently used by the Zig Zag Railway as a terminus. The platform on the loop was also removed. The construction was initially planned to take six months but due to a number of delays, including one incident where among other things a charge exploded prematurely, the line wasn't officially opened until April 1897.

== Zig Zag Railway ==
The Zig Zag Railway has aspirations to extend the railway from Clarence to Newnes Junction, using the Dargans Deviation.
