= Clarence Tunnel =

Railway tunnel in New South Wales, Australia

- Interactive map of Clarence Tunnel

Overview
- Line: Main Western railway line
- Location: Blue Mountains, New South Wales, Australia
- Coordinates: 33°28′42″S 150°13′06″E

Operation
- Opened: 18 October 1869
- Closed: 16 October 1910<
- Reopened: 18 October 1975 (as tourism facility)
- Operator: Zig Zag Railway

Technical
- Length: 439 metres (1,440 ft)

The Clarence Tunnel is a railway tunnel that was originally part of the Main Western railway line across the Blue Mountains, New South Wales, Australia. It is 493 metres (539 yd) long.

== History and description ==
The tunnel, located to the west of Clarence, was built by William Watkins and opened on 18 October 1869. The tunnel is almost entirely straight apart from a curve at the Clarence end and is the highest railway tunnel in Australia. The tunnel was closed on 16 October 1910, after being by-passed by a new deviation. After the tunnel's closure, it was utilised for growing mushrooms. In 1944, during World War II, the Royal Australian Air Force (RAAF) stockpiled chemical munitions in the tunnel. The facility was known as No. 4 Sub Depot of No. 1 Central Reserve RAAF and was vacated by the RAAF in 1946.

The tunnel was reopened in 1975 and forms part of the Zig Zag tourist railway.
