= Bell railway station, New South Wales =

Railway station in New South Wales, Australia

Bell
- Bell Station in 2026

General information
- Location: Bells Line of Road, Bell; Australia
- Coordinates: 33°30′20″S 150°16′44″E
- Elevation: 1,069 metres (3,507 ft)
- Owner: Transport Asset Manager of New South Wales
- Operator: Sydney Trains
- Line: Main Western
- Distance: 137.13 kilometres (85.21 mi) from Central
- Platforms: 2 (1 island)
- Tracks: 2
- Bus routes: 1
- Bus stands: 1
- Bus operators: Lithgow Buslines
- Connections: School Buses

Construction
- Structure type: Ground
- Accessible: Assisted Access

Other information
- Station code: BEL
- Website: Transport for NSW

History
- Opened: May 1875
- Former names: Mount Wilson (1875–1889)

Passengers
- 2025: 1808 (year); 5 (daily) (Sydney Trains, NSW TrainLink)

Services
Preceding station	Intercity Trains	Following station
Zig Zag towards Lithgow	Blue Mountains Line	Mount Victoria towards Central
Lithgow Terminus	Blue Mountains Line Limited express	Mount Victoria towards Central
Former services
Preceding station	Former services	Following station
Newnes Junction towards Lithgow	Main Western Line (1876–1975)	Hartley Vale towards Sydney
Location

Bell railway station is a heritage-listed railway station located on the Main Western line in New South Wales, Australia. It serves the Blue Mountains village of Bell, and opened in May 1875 as Mount Wilson, being renamed Bell on 1 May 1889. Situated 1,069 metres above sea level, it is the station with the highest elevation on the Sydney Trains network. From December 2019 to May 2020, the station was closed due to major bushfire damage on the line.

== Platforms and services ==
Bell has one island platform with two sides. It is served by Sydney Trains Blue Mountains Line trains travelling from Sydney Central to Lithgow. It is a request stop with passengers having to notify the guard if they wish to alight, and signal the driver if they want to board.

Platform	Line	Stopping pattern	Notes
1	Blue Mountains Line	services to Sydney	request stop
2	Blue Mountains Line	services to Lithgow	request stop

== Transport Links ==
Lithgow Buslines operate one school bus route to and from Bell station:

- S365: Owl Bus - Bell to Lithgow Schools via Clarence

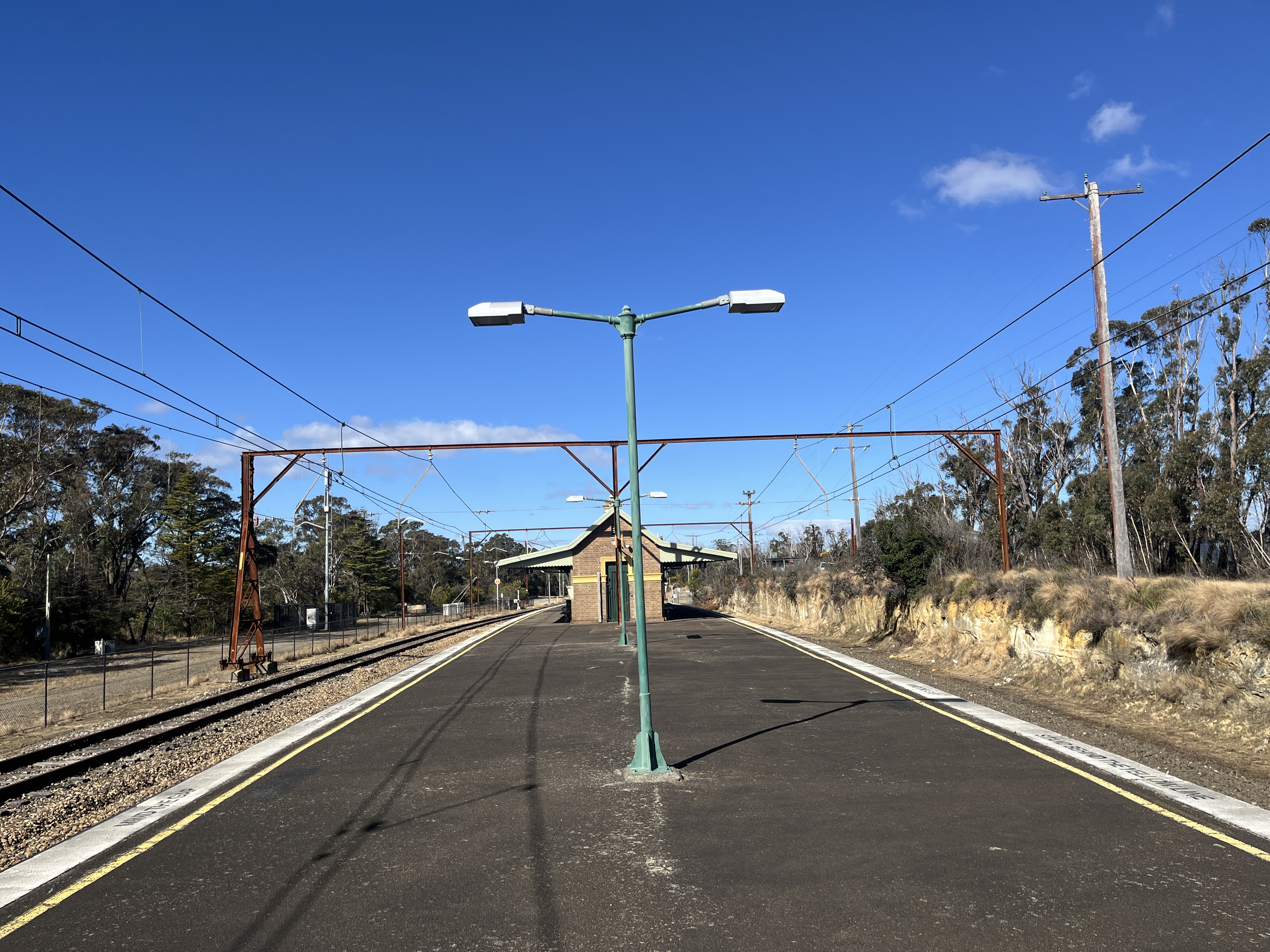
Eastbound view from station platform looking at station building, July 2025
