= Cooerwull railway station =

Former railway station in New South Wales, Australia

Cooerwull

General information
- Coordinates: 33.4834°S 150.1455°E GDA94
- Line: Main Western Line
- Platforms: 2
- Tracks: 2

Other information
- Status: Demolished

History
- Opened: 23 June 1941
- Closed: 11 February 1974
- Electrified: 22 June 1957

Services
Preceding station	Former services	Following station
Bowenfels towards Bourke	Main Western Line	Lithgow towards Sydney
Location

Cooerwull railway station was a railway station on the Main Western railway line in New South Wales, Australia.

== History ==
The station was established during World War II to assist workers commuting from the Blue Mountains to employment in the iron, steel and small arms industries in Lithgow. It also serviced a number of hostels for munitions workers that had been built along the northern side of the railway line.

The station closed in 1974 when services to Bowenfels were cut back to Lithgow. In 2002 the station footbridge was identified as the last of its design still standing in Australia, and was relocated to Top Points station on the Zig Zag Railway. The remainder of the station has been incorporated into the Great Zig Zag public reserve as a relic of Lithgow's industrial heritage.
