= Top Points railway station =

Railway station in New South Wales, Australia

Top Points
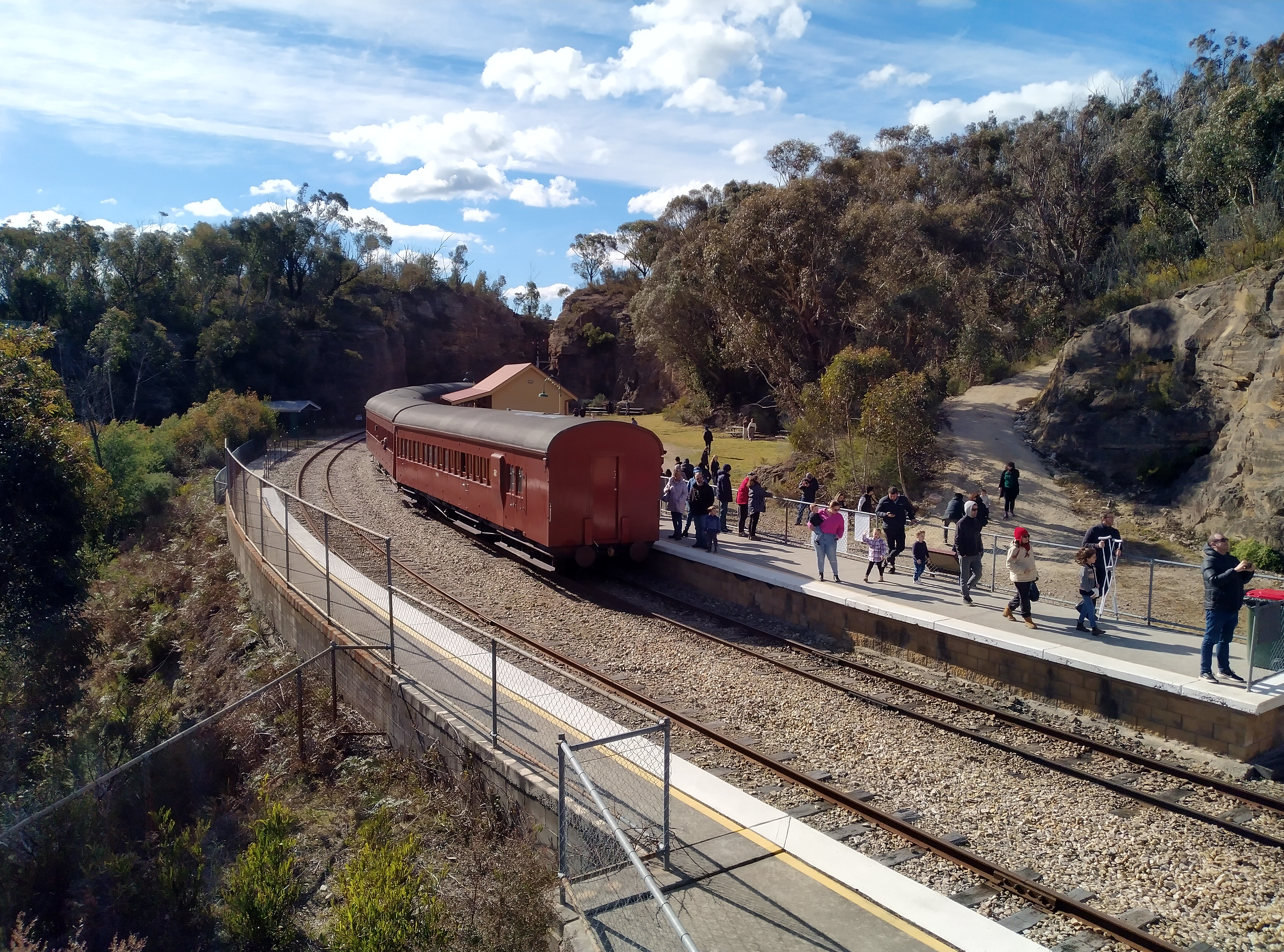
- View from the footbridge in July 2023

General information
- Location: Lithgow; Australia
- Elevation: 1,025 metres (3,363 ft)
- Line: Zig Zag Railway
- Platforms: 2 side
- Tracks: 2

Construction
- Structure type: Ground

Other information
- Website: Top Points

History
- Opened: 18 October 1975

Services
Preceding station	Zig Zag Railway	Following station
Bottom Points Terminus	Zig Zag Railway	Clarence Terminus
Location

Top Points is a railway station on the Zig Zag Railway (heritage railway) in the Blue Mountains area of New South Wales.

It is situated at the reversal point of the Middle and Top Roads of the Lithgow Zig Zag. When the Zig Zag Railway reopened in October 1975, Top Points was a terminal station on the line. It originally consisted of a platform on the western side with the eastern platform constructed after the line was extended to Clarence. The area behind the eastern platform was a carpark.

In 2002, the former Cooerwull station footbridge was added to join the two platforms.
