= Dargan, New South Wales =

Dargan New South Wales
- Coordinates: 33°28′54″S 150°15′4″E
- Population: 94 (2016 census)
- Postcode(s): 2786
- Elevation: 1,073 m (3,520 ft)
- Location: 130 km (81 mi) W of Sydney CBD; 5 km (3 mi) W of Bell; 15 km (9 mi) E of Lithgow
- LGA(s): City of Lithgow
- State electorate(s): Bathurst
- Federal division(s): Calare
Localities around Dargan:
Clarence	Wolgan Valley	Wolgan Valley
Clarence	Dargan	Bell
Hartley Vale	Hartley Vale	Bell

Dargan is a village in the Central West region of New South Wales, Australia. The village is located in the local government area of the City of Lithgow. At the 2016 census, Dargan had a population of 94.
