= Queensland Railways 2000 class rail motor =

Australian self-propelled railcar

Queensland Railways 2000 class railmotor
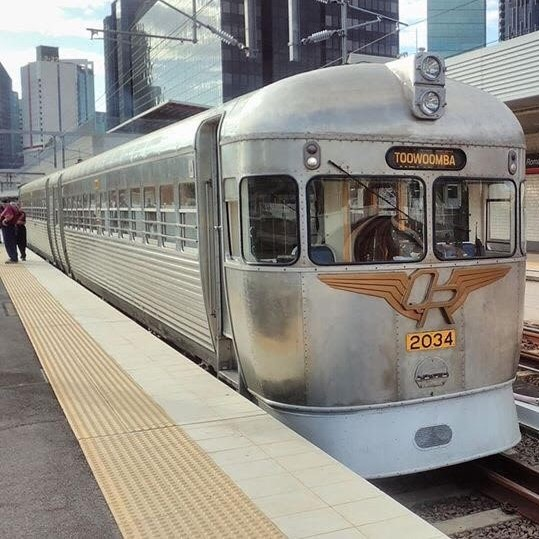
- 2000 class on a railtour to Toowoomba in September 2018
- In service: 1956–present
- Manufacturers: North Ipswich Railway Workshops; Commonwealth Engineering
- Built at: Ipswich; Rocklea
- Constructed: 1956–1971
- Number built: 42
- Number in service: 5
- Number preserved: 22
- Number scrapped: 15
- Formation: Up to four cars
- Fleet numbers: 2000–2034, 2036, 2038, 2040, 2051, 2053, 2055, 2057
- Capacity: 54 passengers 42 passengers (with luggage compartment); 52 passengers (intermediate cars)
- Operators: Queensland Railways, Aurizon
- Depots: Current: Edge Hill (Cairns), Longreach, Ipswich Workshops Former: Cairns, Townsville, Mackay, Mayne, Redbank, Ipswich, Toowoomba

Specifications
- Car length: 55 ft (17 m)
- Width: 8 ft 6 in (2.59 m)
- Height: 5 ft 6 in (1.68 m)
- Entry: Platform level and step
- Doors: 2
- Wheel diameter: 2 ft 6 in (0.76 m)
- Wheelbase: 6 ft 6 in (1.98 m)
- Maximum speed: 50 mph (80 km/h)
- Weight: 21.3 t (21.0 long tons; 23.5 short tons) (2000–2001); 22 t (22 long tons; 24 short tons) (2002–2057)
- Axle load: 5.5 TAL
- Prime movers: 125 hp (93 kW) AEC (2000–2001); 150 hp (110 kW) Rolls-Royce (2002–2057)
- Coupling system: Screw and Hook, Emergency attachable coupler
- Multiple working: Within Class
- Track gauge: 1,067 mm (3 ft 6 in)

The 2000 class railcars are a class of self-propelled railcars built by Commonwealth Engineering, Rocklea for the Queensland Railways between 1956 and 1971.

== History ==
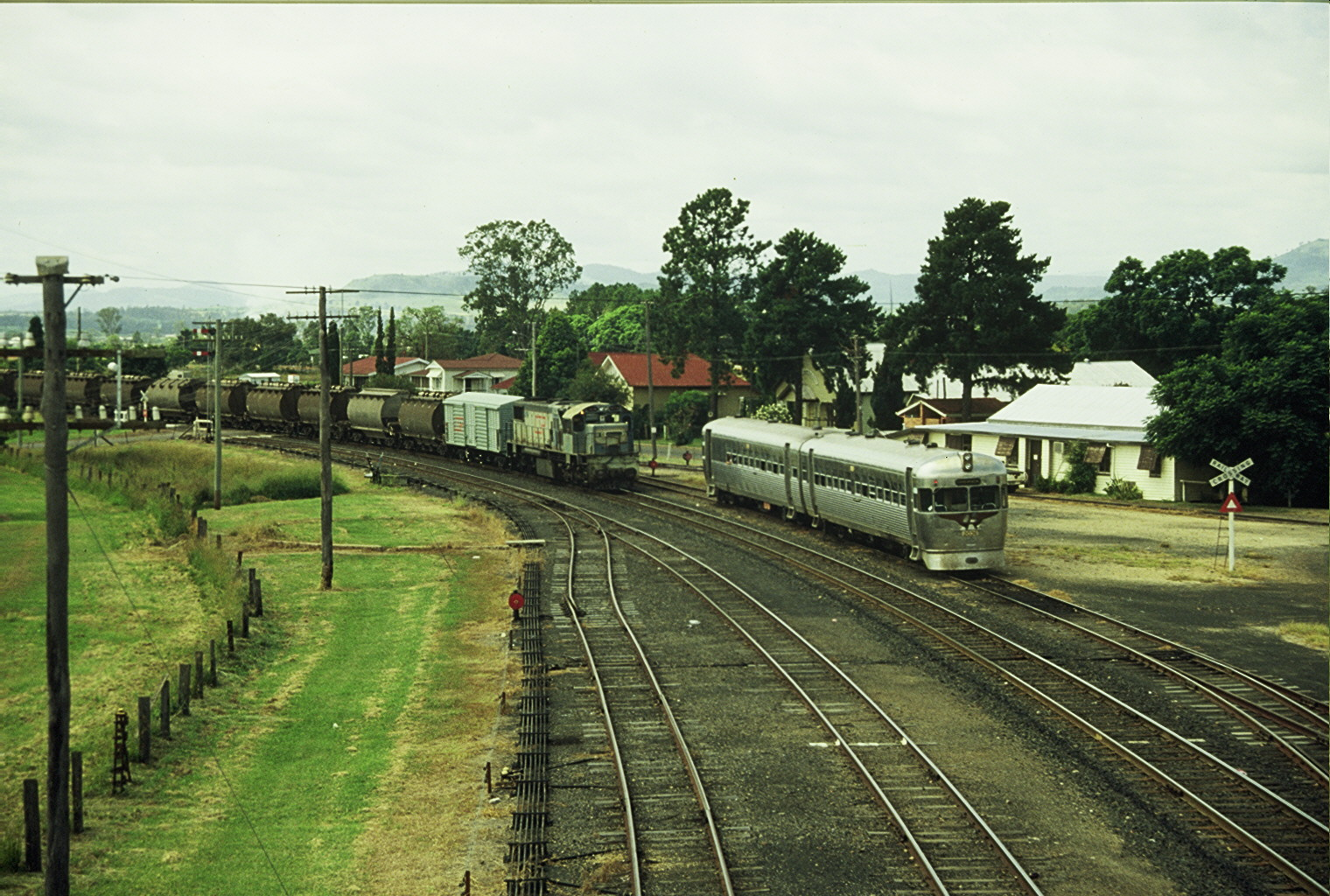
2000 class rail motors at Helidon in 1987.

In 1956, two 2000 class railmotor prototypes were constructed by Queensland Railways at its Ipswich Railway Workshops sheeted in satin finished aluminium. They were powered by 125 hp (93 kW) AEC engines.

In 1959, ten units were ordered from Commonwealth Engineering. These differed from the prototypes in having sheeted stainless steel and 150 hp (110 kW) Rolls-Royce engines. In 1963, a further five were ordered, followed in 1971 by a further ten. The last four were completed as Passenger Luggage Driving Trailers with access doors at both ends instead of a streamlined front, allowing the formation of three-car (and occasionally four-car) trains.

They operated services around Brisbane as well as being allocated to Mackay, Townsville and Cairns.

Most were withdrawn in the early 1990s, with the last operating in regular service on the Corinda-Yeerongpilly line in January 2000.

Queensland Rail retains nine units, of which three operate The Savannahlander tourist train, three are operational with the QR Heritage Division (and occasionally used by Queensland Rail for track inspections) and three are stored at Ipswich Workshops. Aurizon inherited two units from QR National which are used for track inspections. These units are now with DownsSteam Tourist Railway & Museum. Many others are preserved.

In October 2022, two units were road transferred from Ipswich to Longreach for Outback Aussie Tours for their upcoming "Outback Rail Adventure" tours.

== Summary ==
Key:	In Service	Withdrawn	Preserved	Scrapped

Number	In service	Withdrawn	Scrapped	Current owner	Notes
RM2000	10 May 1956	8 April 1987	Some time after 2004		Prototype Cars
RM2001	21 December 1956	8 April 1987	Some time after 2004		Prototype Cars
RM2002	12 May 1960	12 November 1988		Private	Stored
RM2003	12 May 1960	18 January 1989	June 1996		
RM2004	14 July 1960			DownsSteam Tourist Railway & Museum	Operational, formerly operated by Aurizon
RM2005	14 July 1960	1 July 2000		Queensland Rail Heritage Division	Stored
RM2006	26 October 1960	30 December 1993		Zig Zag Railway	Repairs in progress
RM2007	26 October 1960	30 September 1992		Private	Stored
RM2008	28 November 1960	7 February 1989		Zig Zag Railway	Stored
RM2009	28 November 1960	3 April 1989		Private	Stored
RM2010	12 January 1961	2 December 1988	June 1995		
RM2011	12 January 1961	1 April 1994		Zig Zag Railway	Repairs in progress
RM2012	11 February 1961	6 February 1989		Private	Body preserved at Station Road Cafe, Station Road Yeerongpilly.
RM2013	11 February 1961	29 January 1975	December 1976		
RM2014	7 March 1961	13 June 1989		Mount Morgan Railway Museum	Operational
RM2015	7 March 1961	20 January 1989	June 1995		
RM2016	30 March 1961	25 June 1991	2018	Zig Zag Railway	Burnt in 2013 New South Wales bushfires.
RM2017	30 March 1961	31 December 1993		Mary Valley Rattler	Operational
RM2018	5 May 1961	20 January 1989	June 1995		
RM2019	5 May 1961	20 January 1989	June 1995		
RM2020	5 June 1961	17 January 1989		Zig Zag Railway	Stored
RM2021	5 June 1961	29 March 1989		Private	Stored
RM2022	22 March 1963	30 December 1993	June 1995		
RM2023	22 March 1963	31 December 1993		Mary Valley Rattler	Operational
RM2024	26 April 1963	1 July 2000		Queensland Rail Heritage Division	Under restoration at Atherton - Herberton Historic Railway
RM2025	26 April 1963	7 August 1989		Private	Stored
RM2026	10 May 1963			Queensland Rail	Leased to Cairns Kuranda Steam to operate the Savannahlander
RM2027	10 May 1963	30 December 1993	June 1995		
RM2028	14 June 1963			Queensland Rail	Leased to Cairns Kuranda Steam to operate the Savannahlander
RM2029	14 June 1963	30 December 1993	June 1995		
RM2030	1 June 1963	9 May 1991	June 1995		
RM2031	1 June 1963	1 July 2000		Queensland Rail Heritage Division	Under restoration at Atherton - Herberton Historic Railway
RM2032	17 December 1970			DownsSteam Tourist Railway & Museum	Operational, formerly operated by Aurizon
RM2033	17 December 1970	30 December 1993		Australian Railway Historical Society	Rosewood Railway Museum
RM2034	10 January 1971	1 July 2000		Queensland Rail	Leased to Outback Aussie Tours to operate the Longreach based Outback Rail Adventure
RM2036	10 January 1971	1 July 2000		Queensland Rail	Leased to Outback Aussie Tours to operate the Longreach based Outback Rail Adventure
RM2038	20 April 1971	4 January 1994		Australian Railway Historical Society	Rosewood Railway Museum
RM2040	20 April 1971	5 October 1990	June 1995		
RM2051	11 February 1971	5 January 1994		Zig Zag Railway	Repairs in progress
RM2053	11 February 1971			Queensland Rail	Leased to Cairns Kuranda Steam to operate the Savannahlander
RM2055	15 March 1971	1 October 1993	2018	Zig Zag Railway	Burnt in 2013 bushfires
RM2057	15 March 1971	1 July 2000		Queensland Rail Heritage Division.	Operational, has received a new engine and some new internal modifications; including Disabled Access and Toilet facilities. Main line registered
