= Clarence, New South Wales =

Clarence New South Wales
- Coordinates: 33°28′25″S 150°13′34″E
- Population: 200 (2021 census)
- Elevation: 1,112.8 m (3,651 ft)
- Location: 135 km (84 mi) W of Sydney; 10 km (6 mi) W of Bell; 10 km (6 mi) E of Lithgow
- LGA(s): City of Lithgow
- State electorate(s): Bathurst
- Federal division(s): Calare
Localities around Clarence:
Oakey Park	State Mine Gully	Bell
Corney Town	Clarence	Dargan
Hartley, Vale Of Clwydd	Hartley	Dargan, Hartley Vale

Clarence is a location in New South Wales, Australia. It was originally a railway outpost on the original railway line across the Blue Mountains, but by 1908 when Clarence was used as headquarters for the Ten Tunnels Deviation works, the town population had flourished to over 5,000 residents, the majority being the navvies employed on the deviation works. When the deviation was opened in 1910, the town population quickly fell, despite a new platform built on the new deviation.

== History ==
Clarence was originally a railway outpost on the Main Western railway line. The original railway station was opened in 1869 and closed in 1910 when the Zig Zag Railway was bypassed for the Ten Tunnels Deviation.

== Population ==
In the 2021 Census, there were 200 people in Clarence. 78% of people were born in Australia and 87.5% of people spoke only English at home.

== Zig Zag Railway ==
In 1975, the Lithgow Zig Zag, which had been abandoned for 65 years was taken over by the Zig Zag Railway enthusiast enterprise. Narrow gauge track was laid on the alignment and several withdrawn ex-Q.R steam locomotives were imported for use on the Zig Zag tourist line. Today, it is one of Australia's most well-known tourist lines and the original station at Clarence has since been restored for use as the terminus.

There is the nearby Clarence Colliery, opened in the 1970s, that was closed and then re-opened again. It is served by a loop line that branches off Newnes Junction.
