= Lithgow Zig Zag =

Railway line in New South Wales, Australia

The Great Zig Zag

Lithgow Zig Zag
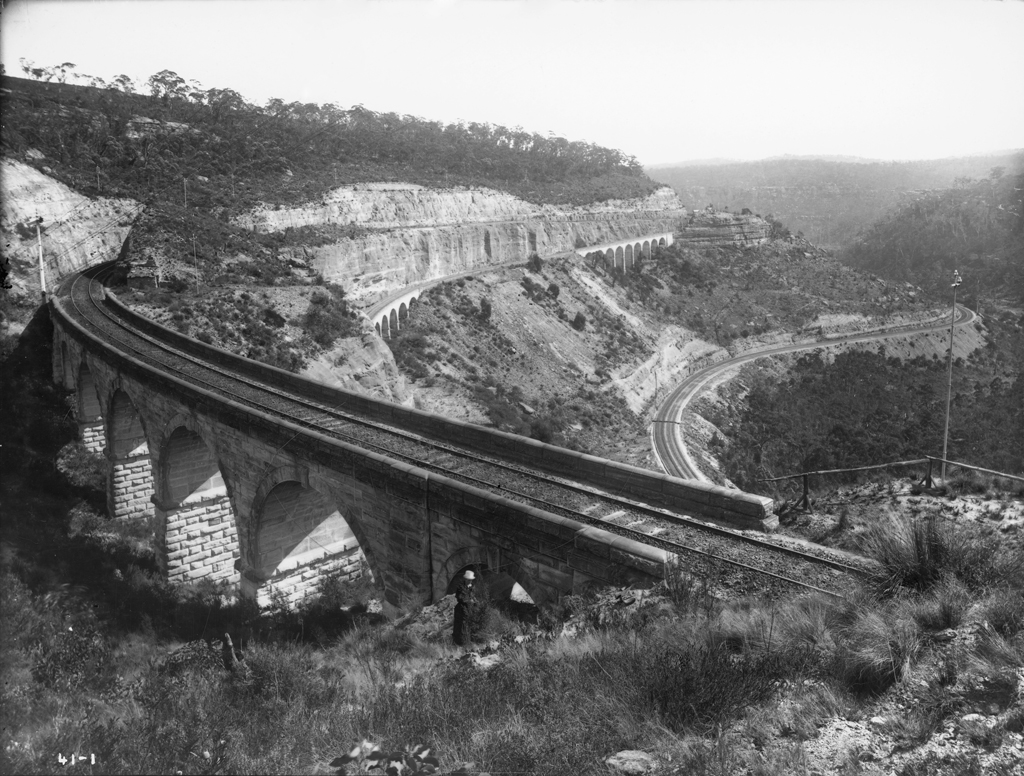
- Top, middle, and bottom parts of the Zig Zag railway
- Locale: Western Blue Mountains, New South Wales
- Coordinates: 33°28′33″S 150°11′52″E

Commercial operations
- Name: NSW Government Railways; Great Western Railway
- Built by: Patrick Higgins (contractor for NSWGR)
- Original gauge: 4 ft 8 1/2 in (1,435 mm) standard gauge

Preserved operations
- Operated by: Zig Zag Railway Cooperative (established 1972) as Zig Zag Railway
- Stations: Clarence, Mt Sinai Halt, No1 Viaduct, Top Points, Cockerton, Bottom Points
- Length: 7 kilometres (4.3 mi)
- Preserved gauge: 3 ft 6 in (1,067 mm)

Commercial history
- Opened: 18 October 1869
- Closed: 16 October 1910 (bypassed by the Ten Tunnels Deviation)

Website
- zigzagrailway.com.au

New South Wales Heritage Register
- Official name: Great Zig Zag Railway and Reserves; Zig Zag Railway
- Type: State heritage (complex / group)
- Criteria: a., c., d., e.
- Designated: 2 April 1999
- Reference no.: 542
- Type: Railway
- Category: Transport – Rail
- Builders: Patrick Higgins (contractor)

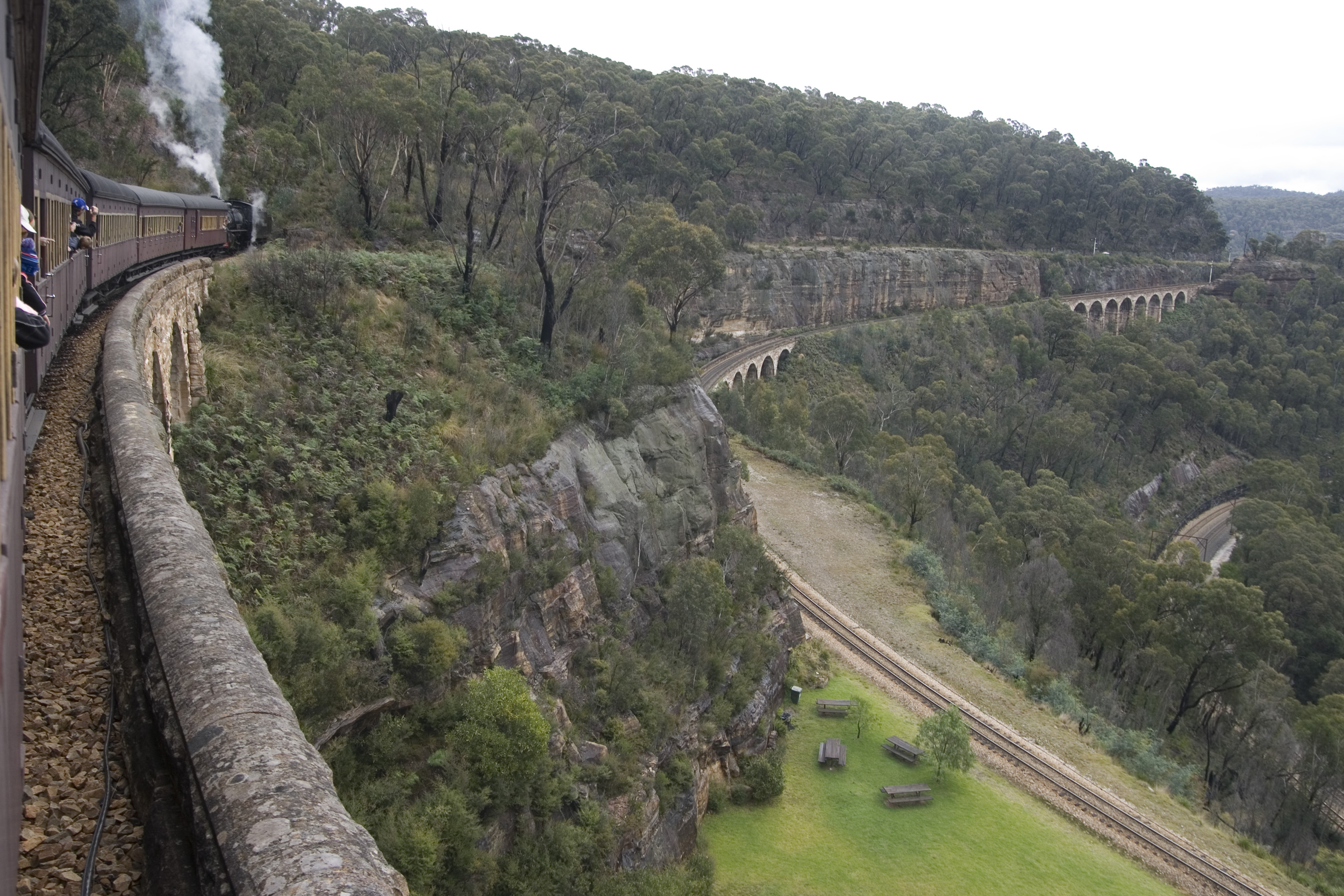
A View of the Zig Zag railway

The Lithgow Zig Zag is a heritage-listed former zig zag railway line built near Lithgow on the Great Western Line of New South Wales in Australia. The zig zag line operated between 1869 and 1910, to overcome an otherwise insurmountable climb and descent on the western side of the Blue Mountains. It was designed by John Whitton and built from 1863 to 1869 by Patrick Higgins as contractor. It is also known as the Great Zig Zag Railway and Reserves and Zig Zag Railway. The property is owned by Department of Planning and Infrastructure (State Government). It was added to the New South Wales State Heritage Register on 2 April 1999.

Part of the railway line is now used by the Zig Zag Railway, a narrow gauge tourist railway.

== History ==
=== Construction ===
The original plan by the Engineer-in-Charge of New South Wales Government Railways, John Whitton, had been to build a 2-mile (3.2 km) tunnel. However, this was beyond the resources of the Colonial Government at the time. The zig zag alternative still required several short tunnels and some viaducts. After consideration of several alternate routes the Great Western Railway was extended along the high ridge of the Darling Causeway from Mount Victoria. The descent to the Lithgow Valley was originally proposed by means of a tunnel. In 1866 the tunnel was estimated to be about two miles in length and a figure of $800,000 was set down as the cost of its construction. However, due to the enormous cost, construction time and, as John Whitton, Engineer-in-Chief of the NSW Railways reported at the time, it would have been difficult to get a contractor to undertake such difficult work. As a result, John Whitton selected the zig zag method of ascent and descent.

On the eastern side of the range, the Lapstone Zig Zag, also designed under the supervision of John Whitton, opened near Glenbrook in 1867. The Lapstone Zig Zag ascended Lapstone Hill on a gradient of 1:30 to 1:33 (~ 3 - 3.3%), which contoured up the side of the range with comparatively light earthworks.

By contrast, the Lithgow Zig Zag railway, built between 1866 and 1869, required much heavier engineering, including four large rock cuttings, three fine stone viaducts with 30-foot (9.1 m) semi-circular arches (originally four were planned, but one was built as an embankment instead) and a short tunnel (three tunnels were planned, but two were daylighted during construction due to leaks, becoming two of the four cuttings mentioned above). In the descent of the middle road, the line dropped 101 feet (31 m) between the reversing points, being part of the 550 feet (170 m) descent from Clarence. The whole route had a ruling grade of 1:42 (~2.38%).

John Whitton and his work have been underrated in Australian history, although they provided the operational foundation of the main railway lines in New South Wales. In international references Whitton is recognised as one of approximately twenty of the greatest railway civil engineers in the first century of world railway construction. The achievement of his crossings of the Great Divide was superlative at the time and in terms of British railway civil engineering was only exceeded by the difficult crossing of the Indian Ghats.

The contract to build the Great Zig Zag was awarded to Mr Patrick Higgins in May 1866. It was for the Clarence to Wallerawang section of railway which consisted of seven stone viaducts, varying in height from 3.0 to 21.3 metres (10 to 70 ft), three tunnels and nearly one and a quarter million cubic yards of excavations, two-thirds through rock.

==== George Donald ====
George McGarvie Donald of Lithgow was a master stonemason and builder who helped create the city of Lithgow. Born in Paddington in 1846, he was son of a Scottish stonemason, George Donald, senior. George senior had been encouraged to migrate to New South Wales by Governor Macquarie who wished him to assist with government building works. George junior did an apprenticeship as a stonemason under his father and uncle. After this he was engaged on railway construction projects in the Bowenfels district in the late 1860s. He worked on stone railway bridges at the Great Zig Zag and Marrangaroo, and married Marion Miles, daughter of one of the construction foremen. Following completion of the railway he moved to Hill End and worked on a range of construction projects. Among these was Hill End Methodist church, built of basalt rubble from the gold mines. It is now used as an Anglican church. After the failure of the deep lead gold boom of the 1870s George returned to the Lithgow valley and established a construction business with Thomas Crowe. In the early 1880s he constructed St.Mary's Presbyterian church for Thomas Brown, built as a memorial to Brown's wife, Mary. He also built Cooerwull Academy for Brown, and the Church of St. John the Evangelist at Wallerawang. Other projects included Lithgow Town Hall, Wallerawang Public School the Lithgow Oddfellows Hall and many residences. Donald and Crowe also built Mort's freezing works. George Donald was extremely active in community affairs and had a great sense of social justice. He was founding member of the GUIOOF Lily of the Valley Lodge and the Good Templars Lodge. Popular among citizens he was elected the first mayor of Lithgow after establishment of the Municipality of Lithgow in 1889. He held the seat of Hartley in the NSW Legislative Assembly jointly with Joseph Cook from 1891.

=== Commercial operation and closure ===
On 19 October 1869 the first official train ran across the Lithgow Zig Zag to Bowenfels railway station, completing the route over the Blue Mountains. This event was heralded worldwide as an engineering marvel resulting in many organised sight-seeing parties from overseas to view it. According to NSW Planning Department documents, in international references, John Whitton is recognised as one of approximately twenty of the greatest railway civil engineers in the first century of world railway construction. The achievement of his crossings of the Great Divide was superlative at the time and in terms of British railway civil engineering was only exceeded by the difficult crossing of the Indian Ghats.

Praise for the Lithgow Zig Zag and the line across the mountains is, however, not universal. At least one critic has opined that, while both the Zig Zag and the subsequent Ten Tunnels Deviation were magnificent works of civil engineering, these projects were aiming to solve the wrong problem. The Zig Zag was required to bring the railway down into the Lithgow Valley. There was a trial survey made of an alternative route, which would have continued the line north-west from Clarence, on a gentler gradient along Clarence ridge, before turning to approach Wallerawang from the north through Lidsdale. Much of this route closely followed an earlier road survey made by Hamiliton Hume and, an assistant surveyor, Lieutenant George Bowen, in 1827. Had such a route been followed, neither zigzag nor tunnels would have been needed but the line from Sydney would still have crossed the mountains, albeit not via Lithgow. It almost certainly would have cost less to build, and—due to gentler grades—could have carried longer and heavier trains. Even after the Zig Zag had been bypassed, banking engines were often needed to assist heavy freight trains over the mountains from Lithgow. Probably, political considerations and the concentration of coal mines and industry near Lithgow—at the time when the railway routes were decided—made a route via the Lithgow Valley inevitable, but it imposed constraints on rail traffic, some of which persist to the present day. Some freight trains now run via Parkes, Stockinbingal and the Main South line to Sydney, rather than use the line over the mountains.

Between 1869 and 1910 the railway was a major force in the development of western New South Wales. Eventually traffic became so dense, due to the growth of the railway system through the spread of settlement, together with the loss of time in working over the Great Zig Zag, that alternatives were considered. From the 1880s many inquiries and investigations were held including consideration of John Whitton's original proposal for a two-mile tunnel.

The Lithgow Zig Zag operated between 1869 and 1910. By then it had become an increasingly inefficient bottleneck owing to the growing traffic on the line between Lithgow and Sydney. The Top Points were also too short.

Two major accidents occurred in 1901, in January a carriage was backed through the top wing buffer stops and in April a goods engine burst through the buffer stops located at the top "wing" and almost fell into the valley below.

To alleviate the congestion, until a new deviation opened, the "top" and "bottom" wings were improved. The "top" wing was abandoned and a new line constructed which involved a sharp curve, heavy rock excavations and earth fillings to a depth of 60 feet (18 m). The "bottom" wing was lengthened without any re-location. However, accidents still continued to occur, as was seen on 8 December 1908 when a Sydney bound goods train stalled just beyond Clarence Tunnel. The train was divided into two but the bottom portion accidentally became a runaway and eventually crashed into the rock cutting of Top Points.

There were plans to replace the section of 1 in 42 from Lithgow to Bottom points with a second horseshoe curve-like longer deviation, or with a spiral, but as this section in the open air could be operated with bank engines, this second stage deviation was never carried out.

In 1908, work began on the Ten Tunnels Deviation, a double tracked route with a ruling grade of 1:42 as far as the start of the ten tunnels and 1 in 90 through the ten tunnels. The Lithgow Zig Zag was eventually abandoned in 1910, replaced by the Ten-Tunnels Deviation which is still in heavy use as the Main West line to the central-west of NSW and ultimately the trans-Australia line between Sydney and Perth. On 16 October 1910 the new deviation was opened for traffic and the Great Zig Zag closed.

=== Use following commercial operation ===
During World War II, the Clarence Tunnel on the Lithgow Zig Zag (along with other tunnels on various lines) were used to store chemical weapons for the Royal Australian Air Force. Principally mustard gas and phosgene, the chemical agents were housed in a variety of weapons from bombs to cylinders. The cache was disposed of after the war.

=== Preservation ===
In 1972 a cooperative formed to re-use the line using rolling stock sourced from inter-state. In 1975 the line re-opened as a tourist attraction, operating between Top and Bottom Points. The re-development extended to Mt Sinai halt in 1987 and on to Clarence in 1988.

== Description ==
The Great Zig Zag Railway consists of three sections: the "top road", the "middle road" and the "bottom road". Located on the "top road" is number one viaduct. The top points are located where "top road" and "middle road" join. Beyond this two "T" bridges and a stone arch are located at the entrance to the "wing" where the train terminated before proceeding to the "middle road" Located on the "middle road" is number one and number two viaduct and number one tunnel and a cutting which was originally proposed to be number two tunnel. At the end of "middle road" is the bottom "wing". Engineered ledges hewn in the mountainside provide enough room for the railway line.

It has an Institute of Engineers (Australia) National Engineering Landmark plaque.

=== Condition ===
Physical condition is excellent. Archaeological potential is low.

=== Modifications and dates ===
- Construction began in 1863.
- Line opened 1869.
- Railway line duplicated in 1880.
- New "top" and "bottom" wings opened in 1908.
- The Great Zig Zag Railway was closed in 1910.

== Heritage listing ==
As at 30 September 1997, The Great Zig Zag Railway had a profound influence upon the development and economy of western New South Wales. At the time it was the greatest civil engineering work in Australia and was considered worldwide as an engineering marvel. It reflects the difficulty experienced in crossing the Blue Mountains and engineering compromises enforced by economics. The reserve is a fine scenic attraction and the sandstone escarpments and viaducts provide a dramatic juxtaposition to the urban development of nearby Lithgow.

Lithgow Zig Zag was listed on the New South Wales State Heritage Register on 2 April 1999 having satisfied the following criteria.

The place is important in demonstrating the course, or pattern, of cultural or natural history in New South Wales.

It is of historical significance because upon completion it triggered extensive development and had a profound influence on the economy of western New South Wales. It contributed to the economy of western New South Wales to such an extent that it could not handle the volume of traffic and had to be replaced.

The place is important in demonstrating aesthetic characteristics and/or a high degree of creative or technical achievement in New South Wales.

The reserve is a fine scenic attraction in itself, offering superb views of the rugged sandstone valleys and escarpments leading to the western plains. It serves to provide a dramatic juxtaposition to the urban development of nearby Lithgow suburbs. The three main viaducts are particularly pleasing structures.

The place has a strong or special association with a particular community or cultural group in New South Wales for social, cultural or spiritual reasons.

It reflects the difficulty experienced in crossing the Blue Mountains and engineering compromises enforced by economics.

The place has potential to yield information that will contribute to an understanding of the cultural or natural history of New South Wales.

At the time of building the Great Zig Zag Railway was regarded as the greatest civil engineering work in Australia at that time and attracted worldwide interest as an engineering marvel.

== See also ==
- Lithgow power station
- Ten Tunnels Deviation
- Media related to Lithgow Zig Zag at Wikimedia Commons
