= Bowenfels railway station =

Former railway station in New South Wales, Australia

Bowenfels
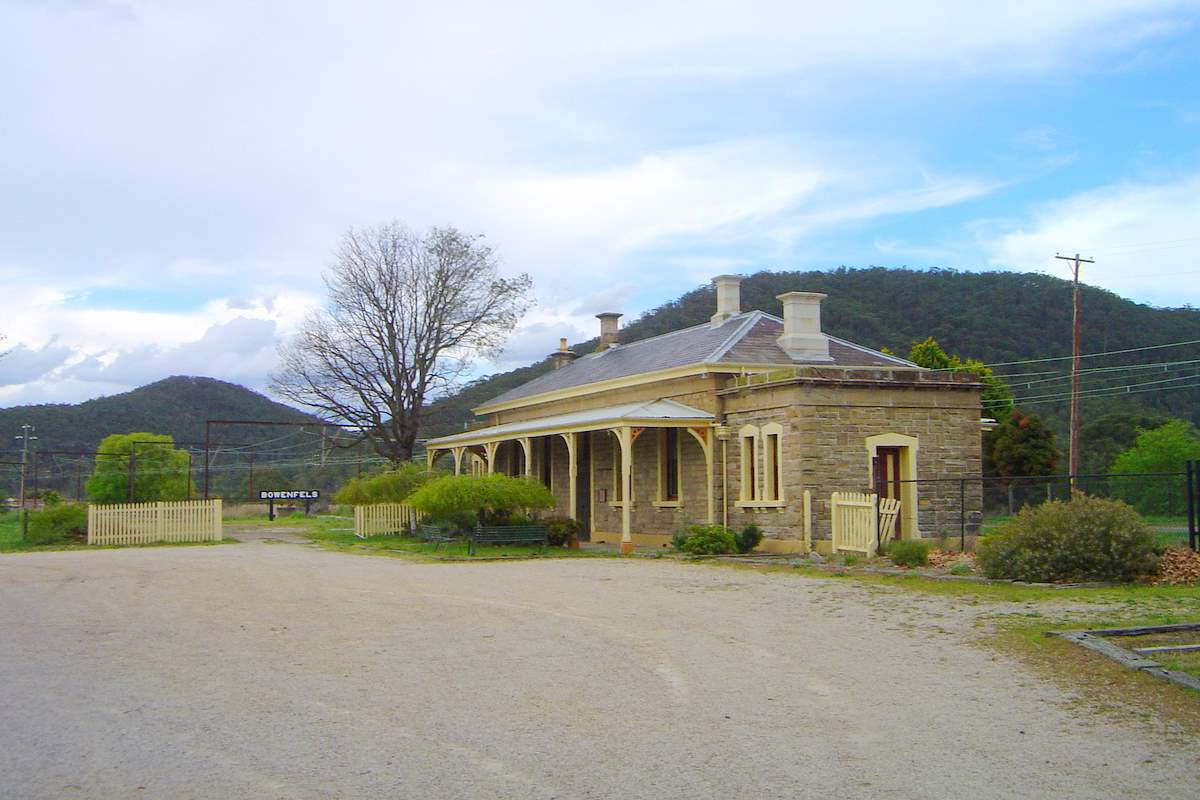
- Station front in October 2004

General information
- Location: Bowenfels, City of Lithgow, New South Wales; Australia
- Coordinates: 33°28′37″S 150°08′08″E
- Owner: Transport Asset Manager of New South Wales
- Operator: Public Transport Commission
- Line: Main Western
- Distance: 158.2 km (98.3 mi) from Central
- Platforms: 2 side (1 demolished)
- Tracks: 2

Construction
- Architect: John Clifton; NSW Government Railway
- Architectural style: Victorian Rustic Gothic

Other information
- Status: Closed

History
- Opened: 18 October 1869
- Closed: 21 September 1974

Services
Preceding station	Former services	Following station
Marrangaroo towards Bourke	Main Western Line	Cooerwull towards Sydney

New South Wales Heritage Register
- Official name: Bowenfels Railway Station and Stationmaster's House; Old Station Masters Residence and Station
- Type: State heritage (complex / group)
- Designated: 2 April 1999
- Reference no.: 475
- Type: Railway Platform/Station
- Category: Transport – Rail
- Builders: G. Watsford, NSW Government Railway
Location

The Bowenfels railway station is a heritage-listed disused railway station located on the Main Western line at Bowenfels, in the Central West region of New South Wales, Australia. It was designed by John Clifton and the New South Wales Government Railways and built from 1869 to 1869 by G. Watsford, NSW Government Railway. It is also known as the Bowenfels Railway Station and Stationmaster's House and Old Station Masters Residence and Station. It was added to the New South Wales State Heritage Register on 2 April 1999.

The sandstone station opened on 18 October 1869 with the construction of the railway and was electrified in 1957 as part of the Blue Mountains line electrification programme. The electrification was to continue to Wallerawang but was curtailed 300 metres (980 ft) west of Bowenfels station. On 14 August 1972, the station staff were removed and two of the three daily passenger services were cut back to Lithgow, with the remaining service following on 21 September 1974 and the station closed.

In 1989, with State Rail Authority road coaches causing congestion around Lithgow station, one of the solutions considered was building an interchange at Bowenfels and reinstating electric services from Sydney. This wasn't pursued with an interchange being built at Lithgow instead. The station was restored in 1994 and operated as the Lithgow tourist information office until 2004. A new Visitor Information Centre was built nearby that year, the main feature being a giant representation of a miner's lamp. Although not in regular use the overhead electric wires remain in situ and up until at least 1987 were kept serviceable by running light engine movements.

== History ==
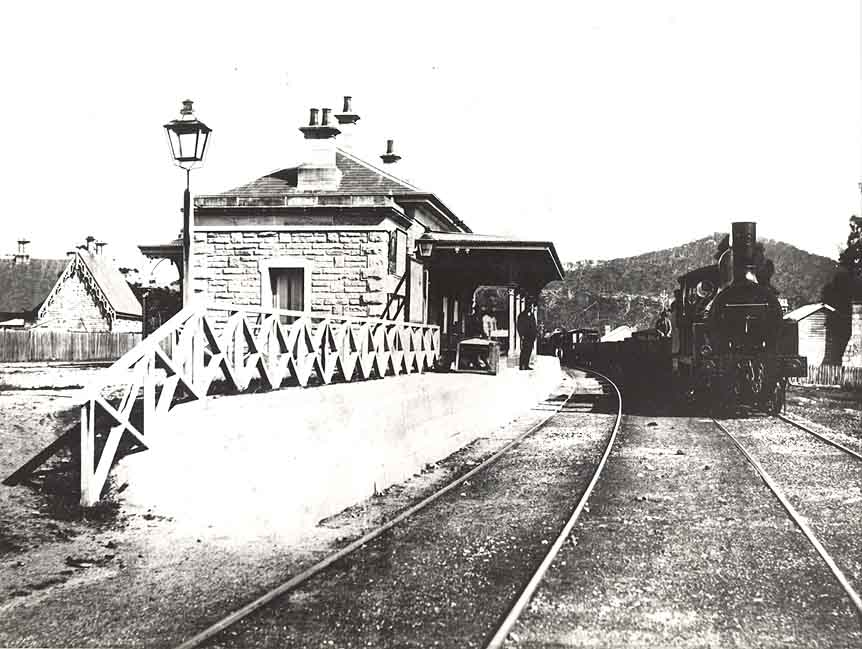
Bowenfels railway station, c. 1880.

The village of Bowenfels forms an outer suburb of the industrial centre of Lithgow. The completion of the Zig Zag railway across the Blue Mountains with its western terminus at Bowenfels provided the impetus for the growth of the area and the industrial development that followed.

The single track main line through Bowenfels was opened in 1869 as part of the Sydney–Bathurst line which reached Bathurst in 1876. The line was constructed during the first major period of New South Wales railway building, 1854–88, and played a particularly significant role in the development of the Bowenfels area, paving the way for the exploitation of local coal reserves, thus leading to the development of Lithgow as a mining and industrial centre.

The station was opened on 18 October the same year as the line, constructed to designs by the railway engineer, John Clifton, with building works contracted to G. Watsford. For five years it was the only station for Lithgow Valley and the railway line was single-track until the line was duplicated from Zig Zag Bottom Points to Bowenfels in 1880 and beyond Bowenfels to Middle River in 1921, by which latter date a second side platform was provided.

The platform stone building and stone Station Master's residence were both erected for the line opening in 1869. The design of both accorded with the standard practice that was in vogue in the 1860s, though use of stone for NSW railway platform buildings, as well as on the stone-faced Bourke-bound platform, was rare and indicated the importance of the station at the time of construction.

Built on simple rectangular plan with verandah front and rear, the station included a ladies' waiting room, main waiting room, ticket office and Station Master's office. Housed in small rooms on either side were the luggage room and ladies' washroom. The gentlemen's toilet was a smaller room adjoining the ladies' washroom. A fireplace positioned in each room catered for the comfort of passengers.

A Gatekeeper's cottage was also built for the line opening in 1869 and is consistent with 12 or so other structures on the Blue Mountains line. The cottage is still extant and is privately owned, but the land is owned by Transport Asset Holding Entity.

A skillion roofed, weatherboard clad signal box was erected at the station in 1919, and the Western line was electrified as far as Bowenfels in 1958. The signal box and a small barrel roofed outbuilding have since been removed.

The station remained in use until 1974 when passenger services ceased and the sidings to the Zig Zag were removed shortly after in 1975. During its years of use there were few major alterations to the building, though some original walls were penetrated to provide for internal access to rooms throughout the building that were otherwise only accessible through external entry ways. At some stage the fireplace in the parcels office section of the building has had its surround removed and the resulting hole blocked, apparently for the insertion of a stove flue, and there were modifications made to the toilets. The platform has been bitumen sealed, and the fencing replaced apart from a small section of rail timber picket fencing.

Works were undertaken at the station in 1994 to accommodate the Lithgow Visitors' Information Centre. This has included the replacement of the floor (due to water damage), a new slate roof, restoration to the sandstone chimneys, painting and repointing. The building is unoccupied in 2009.

== Description ==
The complex comprises the following buildings and structures:

- Station building – type 3, stone, second class station building, erected 1869
- Residences:
  - Station Master's, type 1, stone, erected 1869
  - Gatekeeper's, type 1, stone, erected 1869 – privately owned but on Transport Asset Holding Entity land
- Platform – stone faced, erected 1869.

=== Station building, erected 1869 ===
Exterior: A stone, second class station building in rectangular symmetrical form. The Bowenfels Station building is constructed of coursed, random stone. Quoins are emphasised by large blocks of stone and reveals are stuccoed, while there are smooth cornice and eave mouldings. The central section of the station building is flanked at either end by wings with parapets concealing low pitched corrugated iron roofs behind. The roof to the central section is hipped and clad with slate. Of four extant chimneys one retains its terracotta pot. A verandah to the central section has a low pitched iron roof supported on decorative timber posts with brackets. All joinery is timber framed including four panel doors and box frames of both single and double pane type windows.

Interior: The former station building is now used by COC Limited for office purposes. The building retains original layout with majority of its finishes modified or altered. Most of the fireplaces and their timber surrounds, slate hearths and cast iron grates survive. The fireplace in the former parcels office has been blocked but the slate hearth remains visible. The overall features include plaster ceilings with no cornices, timber architraves and four-panel doors (some removed), parquetry flooring, and modern kitchen and toilet fittings. The former porter's and lamp room maintain original finishes with only a new floor addition and is used for storage. The corrugated metal ceiling is exposed.

=== Station master's residence, erected 1869 ===
Exterior: The former Station Master's Residence reflects the chief characteristics of Victorian Rustic Gothic style architecture, particularly the steeply pitched roof, prominent gables, elaborately traceried bargeboards, label moulds and textured masonry walling. The residence like the station building is also constructed of coursed, random stone and has an asymmetrical façade. The slate roof is steeply pitched with two round stone chimneys (in group of two) with corbelled tops and prominent gables. One gable has a cross shaped vent and another has a date plaque. A veranda over the entrance has an iron roof and is supported on timber posts with decorative brackets and stone floor. Windows, which are boarded, feature smooth dressed reveals and label moulds above.

Interior: The interior layout of the residence is generally discernable and remains in its original form, however, all internal finishes have been substantially modified or removed. Original elements include timber window and door architraves, moulded timber skirtings and stone chimney breasts with inappropriate pointing. All fireplace surrounds and doors have been removed or replaced. Floor finishes are generally carpet and tile flooring. There are no surviving original light or toilet/kitchen fittings.

=== Gate keeper's residence, erected 1869 ===
Exterior: The land of the Gatekeeper's residence is owned by the Transport Asset Holding Entity however; the residence is owned by a private entity. The residence is a simple version of the Station Master's residence featuring the characteristics of Victorian Gothic Revival style architecture. Constructed of coursed, random stone, it features a cross floor plan with steeply pitched corrugated metal roof. Windows are narrow and tall double-hung with two-pane sashes. A skillion roofed wing is located to the rear. Excluded from listing.

=== Platform, erected 1869 ===
A stone platform with stone face, concrete edge and bitumen sealed surface runs along the front of the former Station Building.

=== Moveable items ===
Station sign and remnant timber fence within the garden.

=== Landscape features ===
Gravel carpark and grassed garden with small trees and shrubs. The site essentially benefits from the surrounding properties' landscaping.

=== Potential archaeological features ===
The site has high archaeological potential due to a number of remnant items scattered within the garden in particular around the former station sign including a raised platform and remnant sidings.

=== Condition ===
The station building is generally in very good condition with the exception of a store room at the Lithgow end of the Platform, which is in poor condition internally. The station master's residence is generally in moderate condition. The gate keeper's residence is generally in moderate condition. The buildings are intact externally and relatively intact internally. Overall integrity of the building group is high.

=== Modifications and dates ===
- 27 April 1891 – Station interlocked.
- 30 April 1891 – New Up platform built, costing £291.
- 14 January 1922 – Platforms lengthened.
- 17 August 1941 – Gatehouse sold on Up side at distance 158.620 km.
- 11 August 1975 – Goods and stock sidings abolished.
- 21 August 1975 – Stockyards removed.
- N.d. – Toilets, fittings removed and replaced. Some changes to western end of building for change of use to tourist office.

== Heritage listing ==
As at 18 October 2010, Bowenfels station and residence is of state significance as the earliest railway station beyond the Blue Mountains and remaining in use with minimal alteration for 105 years. The quality of the stonework and Victorian Rustic Gothic design of the buildings are of aesthetic significance. It is one of the best surviving stone station groups with intact early buildings that represent the first major phase of railway construction over the Blue Mountains during the 1860s and 1870s. The Station Master's residence is an unusual railway structure exhibiting excellent design as does the station building with intact slate roofs and original detailing. Bowenfels railway station is of historical significance for its role in the development of the Bowenfels area paving the way for the exploitation of local coal reserves, which lead to the development of Lithgow as a mining and industrial centre.

Bowenfels railway station was listed on the New South Wales State Heritage Register on 2 April 1999 having satisfied the following criteria.

The place is important in demonstrating the course, or pattern, of cultural or natural history in New South Wales.

Bowenfels Station and Residence over the Blue Mountains is of historical significance as part of the first major period of NSW railway construction that played a significant role in the development of the Bowenfels area paving the way for the exploitation of local coal reserves, which lead to the development of Lithgow as a mining and industrial centre.

The place is important in demonstrating aesthetic characteristics and/or a high degree of creative or technical achievement in New South Wales.

The station and residence are of aesthetic significance with its fine stonework and Victorian Gothic Rustic elements contributing to the historic character of the area. The design of the Station Master's residence is unusual, and although accords with the standard practice that was in vouge in the 1860s, the use of stone was indicative of the Bowenfels Station's importance at the time of its construction.

The place has a strong or special association with a particular community or cultural group in New South Wales for social, cultural or spiritual reasons.

The place has the potential to contribute to the local community's sense of place, and can provide a connection to the local community's past.

The place has potential to yield information that will contribute to an understanding of the cultural or natural history of New South Wales.

The group has research potential as part of the Great Western Railway including the Great Zig Zag demonstrating early technical and architectural qualities.

The place possesses uncommon, rare or endangered aspects of the cultural or natural history of New South Wales.

The Bowenfels Station and Residence is one of approximately 13 surviving railway groups from the earliest railway construction period (1850–1860s) in NSW. The buildings are rare due to their construction of stone, which indicates the importance of Bowenfels Station at the time of its construction.

The place is important in demonstrating the principal characteristics of a class of cultural or natural places/environments in New South Wales.

The Bowenfels Station and Residence are representative of Victorian era railway station buildings and residences in NSW. Other examples include Emu Plains, Medlow Bath, Mount Victoria, Valley Heights, Springwood, and Wyong.

== See also ==
- List of disused railway stations in regional New South Wales
