= Zig Zag Railway =

Railway line in New South Wales, Australia

Coordinates: 33°28′18.33″S 150°11′39.20″E

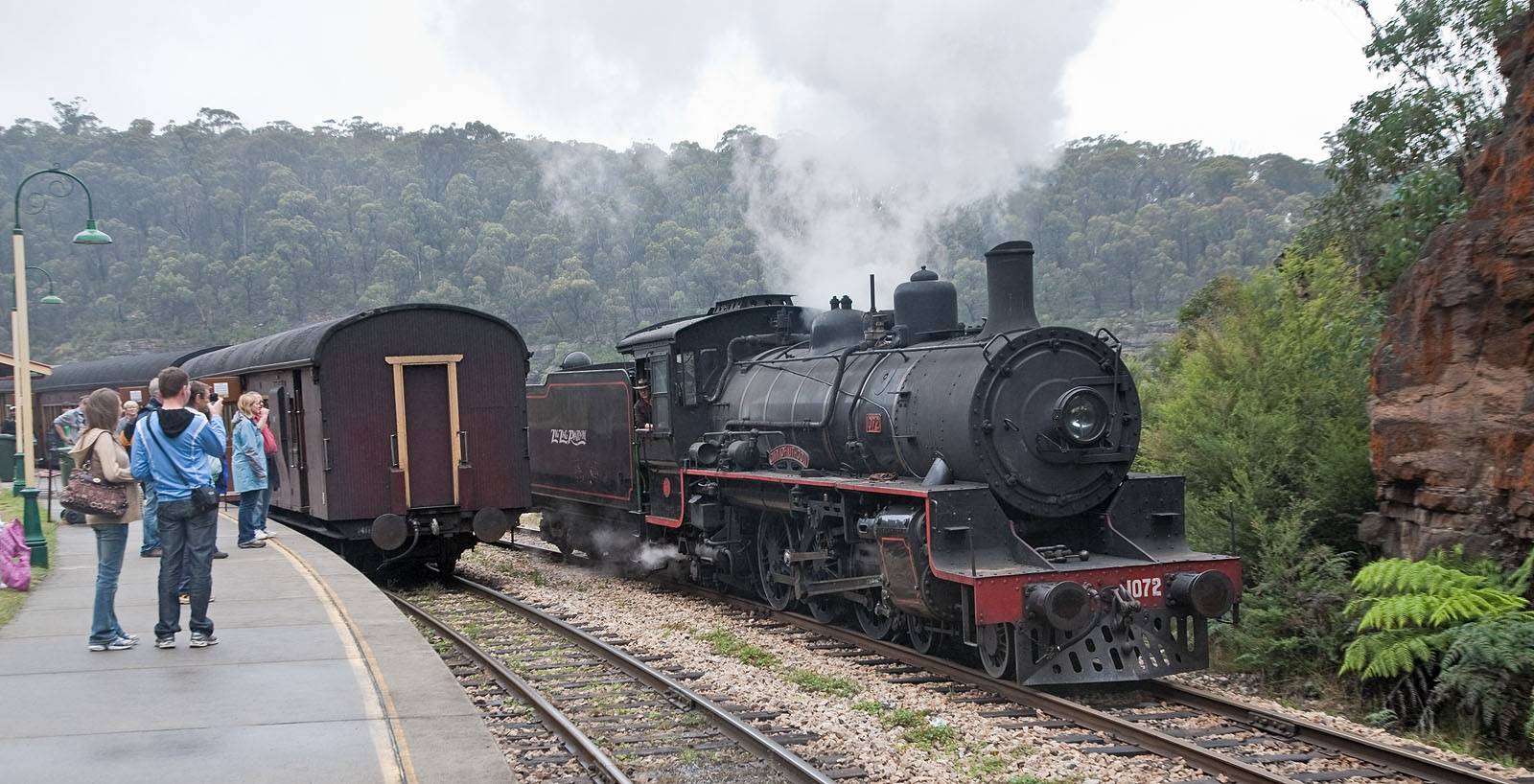
- BB18¼ 1072 City of Lithgow at Top Points
- Locale: Lithgow, New South Wales
- Terminus: Clarence, Bottom Points

Commercial operations
- Name: New South Wales Government Railways; Main Western
- Built by: Patrick Higgins (contractor for NSWGR)
- Original gauge: 4 ft 8 1/2 in (1,435 mm) standard gauge

Preserved operations
- Operated by: Zig Zag Railway Cooperative
- Stations: Clarence; Mt Sinai Halt; No1 Viaduct; Top Points; Cockerton; Bottom Points
- Length: 7 kilometres (4.3 mi)
- Preserved gauge: 3 ft 6 in (1,067 mm)

Commercial history
- Opened: 18 October 1869
- Closed: 16 October 1910
- Preserved era: 18 October 1975 – present

Preservation history
- 1975: Bottom Points to Top Points section opened 18 October
- 1987: Top Points to Mt Sinai section opened 4 April
- 1988: Mt Sinai to Clarence section opened 29 October
- 2012: Operation suspended
- 2013: Badly damaged by bushfires
- 2016: Limited train movements resume (trackwork)
- 2019: Badly damaged by bushfires
- 2020: Limited movements recommence (Work trains)
- 2023: Operations resume

Website
- www.zigzagrailway.com.au

The Zig Zag Railway is an Australian heritage railway, situated near Lithgow, New South Wales. It was opened by the not-for-profit Zig Zag Railway Co-op as an unpaid volunteer-staffed heritage railway in October 1975, using the alignment of the Lithgow Zig Zag line that formed part of the Main Western line between 1869 and 1910. The line climbs the western flank of the Blue Mountains, using railway zig zags to gain height.

Operation of the heritage railway was suspended in 2012 following accreditation issues with the Government of New South Wales. The railway was aiming to resume services in October 2013, but was then severely damaged during the 2013 NSW bushfires and then subsequently by torrential rain. Repairs and trials of restored rail vehicles and track commenced in August 2016 and it was planned to re-commence limited heritage operations in 2019, until the 2019–2020 bushfires damaged key infrastructure. The COVID-19 pandemic further delayed restoration. Heritage train services resumed on 27 May 2023.

== History ==
=== Construction and abandonment ===
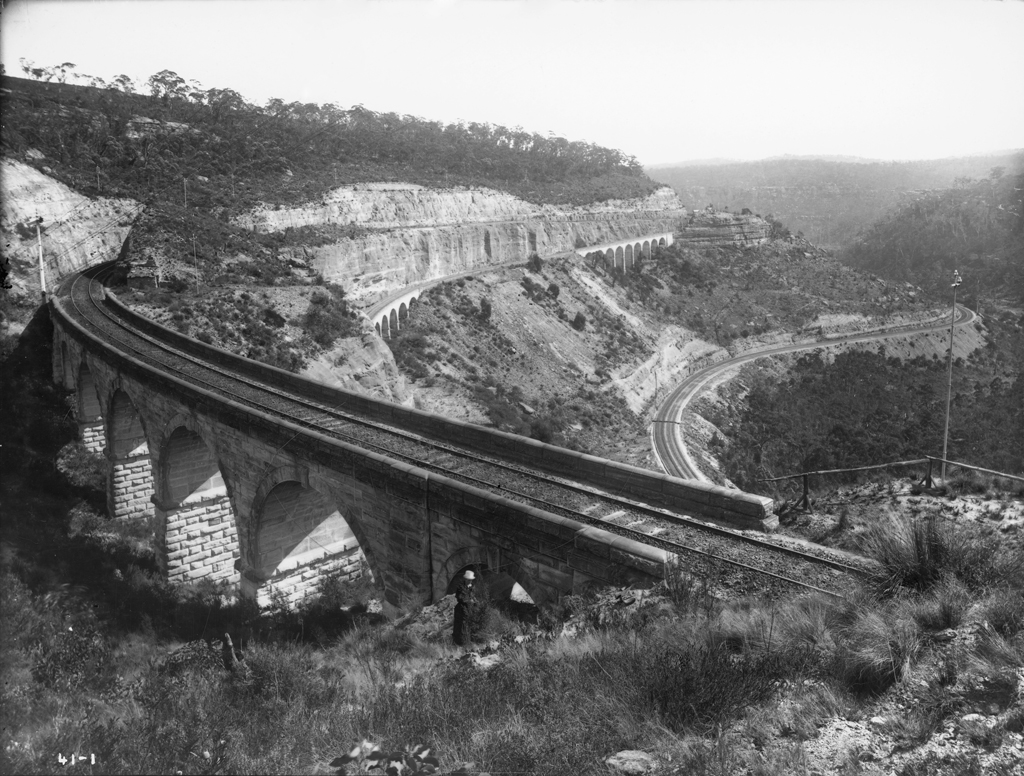
An historical view of the Zig Zag Railway line with Top Road and number 1 viaduct in the foreground, Middle Road and viaducts numbers 2 & 3, and Bottom Road still part of the Main Western line to the right

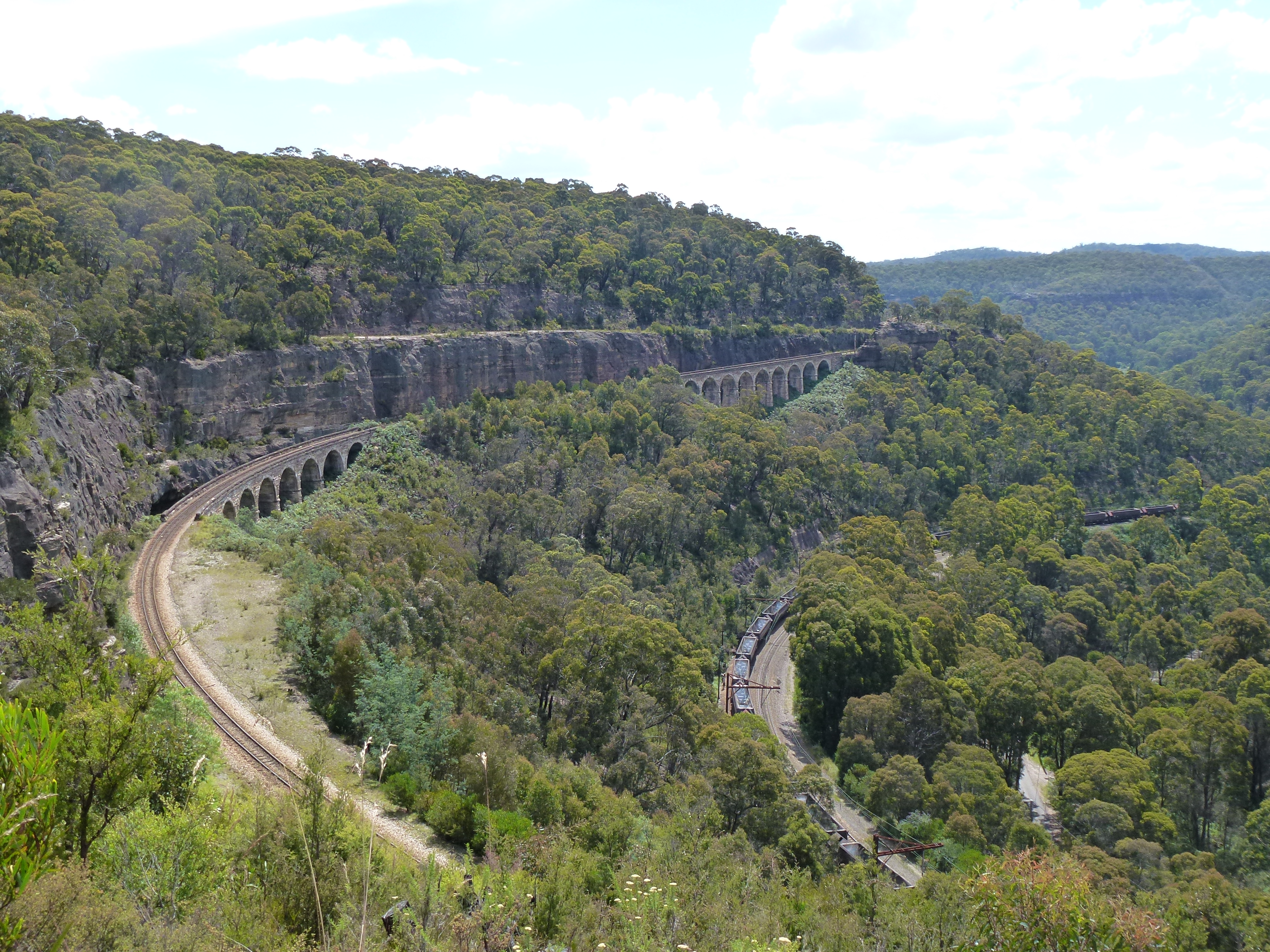
Much the same view more than a century later, not long before the 2013 NSW bushfires

The Lithgow Zig Zag was constructed as part of the Main Western line and opened on 19 October 1869. Between Lithgow and Clarence, the Main Western line needed to climb the western flank of the Blue Mountains, overcoming a vertical distance of 550 ft (170 m). The alternative eventually decided upon required the use of two railway zig zags where all trains had to reverse. The line had a ruling grade of 1:42 (~2.38%) on three inclines known as the Top Road (above Top Points), Middle Road (between the two zig zags) and Bottom Road (below Bottom Points). The line included several short tunnels and some viaducts.

The steep gradients and need to reverse trains proved to be a serious bottleneck to traffic on the line, and there were several accidents with runaway trains at the reversing points. Attempts were made to mitigate this by realigning the track and relocating and extending the reversing stations, but the problems continued. As early as 1885, plans for alleviating the Zig Zag problem involved the construction of a 2 mi (3.2 km) long tunnel. This was said to provide little gain for the cost proposed. In 1908, work began on the Ten Tunnels Deviation, a double-tracked route that by-passed the two reversing stations and the upper two inclines, although retaining the Bottom Road with its 1:42 gradient. Once this was completed, the by-passed section was closed in October 1910.

=== Lithgow Valley Reserve ===
The main railway corridor of the Great Zig Zag Railway forms part of a Reserve administered by Government, it is administered by a trust made up of volunteers. The area was proclaimed a public reserve in 1881, which was one of the first public reserves in NSW, originally supervised by Blaxland Shire Council. In 1946, it was added to the Trust that administered Hassan's Walls, the trust opened Top Road to road traffic in 1949. In 1964, it added the picnic shelter under number 1 Viaduct, naming it in recognition of H K Cockerton Place. Cockerton served as a trustee for 17 years, instigating the development of the reserve, in 1969, the Reserve was transferred to Lithgow Council. In 1990, the Reserve was placed in the Trust of the Zig Zag Railway Co-Op.

==== Revival and preservation ====
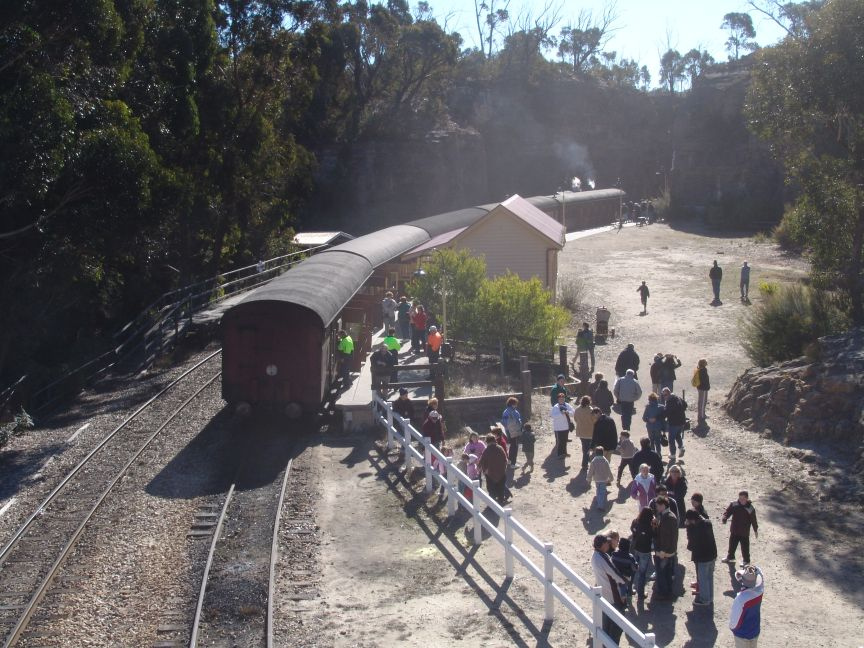
Top Points station in July 2006

In 1967, as the end of steam operation in New South Wales approached, a group of steam enthusiasts headed by Ian Thornton were keen to establish an operating steam museum. The Lithgow Zig Zag was chosen as a suitable site based on its accessibility by day-trippers from Sydney, its scenery, abundant water supplies and availability of coal. In March 1969, negotiations commenced with the Zig Zag Trust, the Department of Lands and the Lithgow City Council.

In 1972, the Lithgow Switchback Railway Co-op Limited was formed and this became the Zig Zag Railway Co-operative Limited in 1974. At this time, the Commissioner for Railways only made heritage locomotives and rolling stock available to the officially sponsored New South Wales Rail Transport Museum. Thus the line was relaid to 1,067 mm (3 ft 6 in) narrow gauge as used in Queensland, South Australia and Tasmania rather than the New South Wales 1,435 mm (4 ft 8 1/2 in) to allow locomotives and carriages to be procured from these states.

In 1975, the new track was complete on the Middle Road between Bottom Points and Top Points. On 29 August 1975 1046 operated the first journey from Bottom Points to Top Points. Services commenced on 18 October 1975, the 106th anniversary of the original opening.

On 4 April 1987, the line was opened along the Top Road between Top Points and Mt Sinai Halt and on 29 October 1988, through to Clarence. A further extension to meet the Main Western line at Newnes Junction has been started with track laid for 50% of the distance.

On 25 January 1996, locomotive 1072 derailed after hitting maintenance equipment. No injuries are known to be reported.

=== Closure and bushfire damage ===
==== Accreditation and collision ====
In August 2006, the Independent Transport Safety Regulator (ITSR), an agency of the Government of New South Wales that regulates safety and accredits railway operators, identified the Zig Zag Railway (and one other operator) as a "higher risk" isolated line operator because of its complex operations and high numbers of passenger trips. The ITSR gave Zig Zag Co-operative additional time to develop a safety improvement plan in order to comply with the Act, which took effect for all heritage railway operators from 1 January 2007.

On 1 April 2011, an incident occurred resulting in a collision between a maintenance vehicle and a two-car rail motor, between Clarence and Top Points stations. Travelling in opposite directions and carrying one passenger (in the Hy-rail) plus one driver of each rail vehicle, two injuries were sustained. A subsequent investigation by the Office of Transport Safety Investigations found that the principal error was miscommunication. The inquiry also identified that a number of other factors were found to have contributed to the collision.

From March 2012, only railcars could be operated and in June 2012, the ITSR ordered a cessation of all services until a number of safety issues were addressed. The railway was then aiming to resume services in October 2013.

==== 2013 bushfire and storm damage ====
The railway was severely damaged by the 'State Mine Fire', part of the October 2013 bushfires. The railway suffered millions of dollars of damage which included ten passenger carriages and four accommodation carriages. The most extensive damage caused by the fires was at Bottom Points workshop where most of the north side was destroyed. This included the spare parts stores, offices and most of the machine shop. Electrical equipment to operate signals was totally destroyed as was the repeater tower for the safety radio communication system and the internal telephone lines and exchange. One thousand new railway sleepers were also lost as was the caretaker's converted accommodation carriage. Locomotive 1047, which had been stored behind Bottom Points workshop, was also badly damaged. Much of the damage was suffered by original railway equipment from the 1920s. At that time, it was estimated that the railway would take a full year to recover from the State Mine Fire. Heavy rain then caused subsequent damage to an embankment near the western end of the Clarence tunnel, the platform area at Top Points, and to the run around loop track at Bottom Points.

In September 2017, restoration of vehicles and infrastructure were still being undertaken and hopes were for recommencement of services as soon as safe and practical. Due to the complexity of repairs and reinstatement infrastructure, the re-opening was hoped for late 2019, but all hopes were dashed with the damage from the 2019 bushfires. The railway’s website and Facebook page both have updates on the redevelopment.

==== 2019 bushfire damage and ongoing repairs ====
In late December 2019, the Zig Zag Railway was hit by the Gospers Mountain bushfire. The station buildings and most of the rolling stock survived with the exception of a few already vandalised carriages. The toilet block, storage areas, communications hut, signalling equipment, water and power supplies and main office with the past 45 years of records were all destroyed along with an estimated 1500 sleepers all of which pushed the reopening a few years back.

On 24 July 2020, diesel locomotive 1004 became the first locomotive to travel from Bottom Points Station to Clarence station since the cessation of steam services in March 2012. Works trains had previously only operated on the Middle Road (Bottom Points to Top Points) due to the extensive damage at Clarence caused by the 2013 embankment slip.

==== 2020s ====
In March 2020, the railway was well into the project of making the rail corridor safe when storms struck Zig Zag, this impacted the return to service the railway was heading for. The ability of workers and volunteers to come onsite was impacted by COVID-19 restrictions in NSW between March and September 2020 and June and November 2021, slowing the progress of work on the railway. Additionally, the railway has been repeatedly affected by weather events, such as storms in January and March 2022.

Eleven years after the last revenue-earning steam train operated on the line, Zig Zag finally reopened to the public on 27 May 2023. Over 2,000 people visited the site on the reopening weekend of 27-28 May 2023, with more than 1,800 riding the train on its first weekend of operations.

The railway celebrated its reopening and 154th anniversary on 21 October 2023 with a tape-cutting ceremony, pre-booked steam train rides, local performances, displays, heritage buses and market stalls.

Circa June 2025, the railway began leasing locomotives 1707D and 1741D from a private owner, with 1707D set aside for future restoration.

== Former schedule ==
Prior to the suspension of services in 2012, the Zig Zag Railways was unique in New South Wales being the only heritage operator to run every day except Christmas Day. On Mondays, Tuesdays, Thursdays, Fridays and Sundays railmotors were operated. Every Wednesday, Saturday and Sunday a steam locomotive with train would operate with Sunday having a two train timetable. Special events included Day Out with Thomas and a Wizards Express event held a couple of times per year. During most school holidays, steam services ran every day. Passengers could join the service at Bottom Points where Zig Zag railway station is served by NSW TrainLink services from Sydney or at Clarence which is adjacent to the Bells Line of Road.

== Locomotives and rolling stock ==
The locomotives and rolling stock on the Zig Zag Railway have been mainly sourced from Queensland Railways, but there are also items from the South Australian Railways and Emu Bay Railway.

The collection includes Queensland Railways 2000 class rail motors, Queensland Railways Evans carriages, Emu Bay Railway diesel locomotives, South Australian Railways end platform carriages and several older carriages and a considerable number of freight style vehicles that are used for demonstration trains, fire fighting, and track and infrastructure repair and maintenance.

=== Steam locomotives ===
Number & Name	Image	Description	Status	Livery	Notes
218A The Yank	218A The Yank, Queensland AC16 class 2-8-2 locomotive	QR 2-8-2 AC16	Operational	Green (Previously Black & Silver)	Operated from 2008 until 2011 before mechanical overhaul. Operational since May 2021.
934	934, Queensland C17 class 4-8-0 locomotive	QR 4-8-0 Class C17	Under overhaul	Red	Operated from 1986 until 2010, currently undergoing full overhaul.
966 City of Rockhampton		QR 4-8-0 Class C17	Stored	Black	Stored at Clarence.
1046		QR 4-6-4T DD17	Out of service	Blue	Operated from 1975 until 1983, dismantled with parts stored in various places around the railway.
1047	1047 loco, Queensland 4-6-4T DD17, awaiting restoration	QR 4-6-4T DD17	Stored, awaiting restoration	Green (Previously Blue)	Operated from 1978 until 1998, stored awaiting restoration, damaged by 2013 fires.
1049 Stormin' Normin	1049 Stormin' Normin, Queensland 4-6-4T DD17	QR 4-6-4T DD17	Stored, awaiting overhaul	Blue	Operated from 1994 until 2011, stored awaiting major boiler overhaul.
1072 City of Lithgow	1072 City of Lithgow, Queensland BB18¼ class locomotive	QR 4-6-2 BB18¼	Stored, awaiting overhaul	Black (Previously Dark Green)	Operated from 1980 until 2011, stored awaiting mechanical overhaul.
402		SAR 4‑8‑2+2‑8‑4 Garratt 400 class	Stored	Green	Stored at Bottom Points.

=== Diesel locomotives ===
Number & Name	Image	Description	Status	Notes
1003		Emu Bay Railway 10 class	Stored, awaiting restoration	Stored at Bottom Points pending restoration.
1004 Emu Bay	1004 Emu Bay, Emu Bay Railway 10 Class	Emu Bay Railway 10 Class	Operational	Operated from 2001 to present.
6		Mines engine, powered by Gardner engine, designed to haul low level flat wagons	Scrapped	Disposed of in 2013. Formerly used for hauling works trains.
1707D		QR 1700 class	Stored, awaiting restoration	Stored at Bottom Points pending restoration.
1741D		QR 1720 class	Operational	

=== Railmotors ===
Number	Image	Description	Status	Notes
2006, 2011, 2051		QR 2000 class rail motor	Stored, awaiting restoration	Stored at Bottom Points pending restoration.
2020		QR 2000 class rail motor	Stored, awaiting restoration	Stored at Top Points, awaiting restoration
2055		QR 2000 class rail motor	Stored	Stored at Clarence.
2008		QR 2000 class rail motor	Stored	Burnt in October 2013 bushfire. Stored incomplete.
2016	Queensland 2000 class rail motor. Burnt in October 2013 bushfire. Dismantled for scrap in 2018	QR 2000 class rail motor	Scrapped	Burnt in October 2013 bushfire. Dismantled for scrap in 2018

=== Passenger carriages ===
During the early 1970s, four ex-NSWR sleeping cars were located at the Bottom Points of the Zig Zag to provide stationary sleeping accommodation, meal and ablution facilities for its volunteer train crews and workers. These were all destroyed by the 2013 fires.

Five South Australian Railways end platform carriages made redundant by the opening of the standard gauge Broken Hill railway line were purchased in 1972 and these were used to inaugurate services. A set of five end platform carriages was purchased in 1974 from the Public Transport Commission of NSW but ultimately not used when 15 Evans side door compartment carriages were purchased from Queensland Railways in 1986 went into service instead. Subsequently additional carriages were purchased from the Beaudesert railway.

=== Freight and works vehicles ===
Zig Zag Railway has a variety of four-wheeled and eight-wheeled freight, fire fighting, and works vehicles. These include fuel and water tank cars, hopper wagons, flat wagons and covered and louvered vans. These vehicles have been sourced from NSW, Queensland, South Australia, Northern Territory, and Tasmania. It also had one Hi-Rail vehicle (that can operate on road or rail).

== Film use ==
In 2003, the railway was used in the production of the Hollywood film Stealth. The area stood in for mountainous regions in North Korea and locomotives were specially painted with Korean Chosongul (Hangul) characters.

In 2024, the railway was also used for the BBC One and Stan drama series Ten Pounds Poms, depicting the life of British immigrants to Australia in the postwar era under a government migration scheme. Scenes were filmed at Top Points station, on the train itself, and from external angles, making the most of the dramatic mountain scenery that the railway offers. The railway's appearance in Series 2, Episode 5, aired on Stan in Australia in March 2025.
