= Queensland BB18¼ class locomotive =

Class of Australian 4-6-2 locomotives

Queensland Railways BB18¼ class
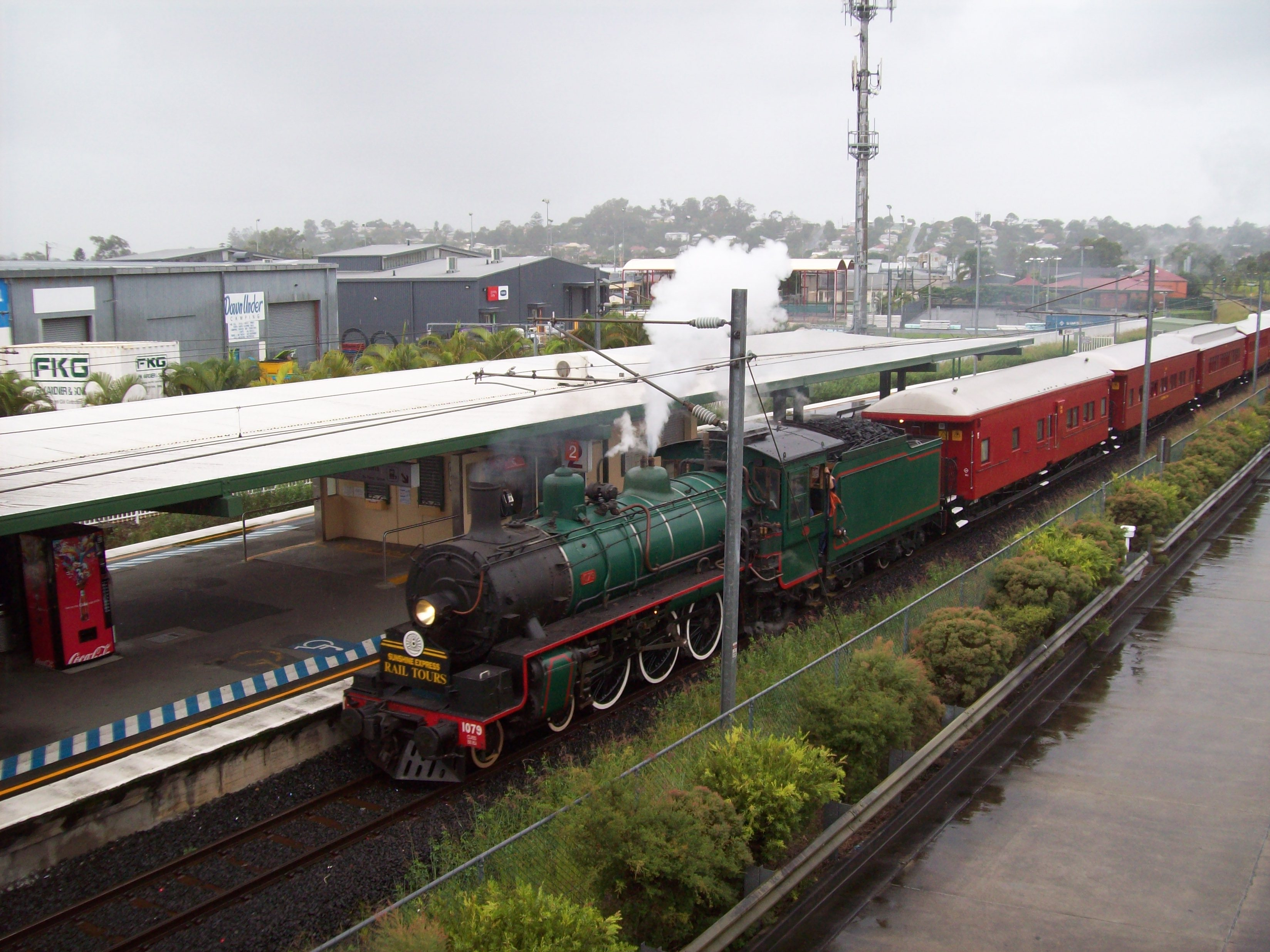
- 1079 passing through Enoggera station in April 2009
Type and origin
- Power type: Steam
- Builder: Vulcan Foundry, Walkers Limited
- Build date: 1950-1958
- Total produced: 55
Specifications
- Configuration
  - Whyte: 4-6-2
- Gauge: 1,067 mm (3 ft 6 in)
- Driver dia.: 4 ft 3 in (1,295 mm)
- Length: 60 ft 2 in (18.34 m)
- Height: 12 ft 6 in (3.81 m)
- Axle load: 12.1 long tons (13.6 short tons; 12.3 t)
- Loco weight: 58.0 long tons (65.0 short tons; 58.9 t)
- Tender weight: 43.2 long tons (48.4 short tons; 43.9 t)
- Total weight: 101.2 long tons (113.3 short tons; 102.8 t)
- Fuel type: Coal
- Fuel capacity: 10.3 long tons (11.5 short tons; 10.5 t)
- Water cap.: 3,500 imp gal (16,000 L; 4,200 US gal)
- Firebox
  - Grate area: 25 sq ft (2.3 m^{2})
- Boiler pressure: 170 lbf/in^{2} (1,172 kPa)
- Heating surface: 1,858 sq ft (172.6 m^{2})
- Cylinder size: 18.25 in × 24 in (464 mm × 610 mm)
- Valve gear: Walschaerts
Performance figures
- Tractive effort: 22,648 lbf (100.7 kN)
- Factor of adh.: 3.59
Career
- Operators: Queensland Railways
- Numbers: 1011-1045, 1070-1089
- Preserved: 1037, 1072, 1077, 1079, 1086, 1089
- Disposition: 6 preserved, 49 scrapped

The Queensland Railways BB18¼ class locomotive is a class of 4-6-2 steam locomotives operated by the Queensland Railways.

== History ==
The first 35 BB18¼ class locomotives were built by the Vulcan Foundry in Newton-le-Willows, England in 1950/51. Per Queensland Railway's classification system they were designated the BB18¼ class, the first B representing they had three driving axles, the second B indicated it was the second generation and the 18¼ the cylinder diameter in inches.

A further 20 built by Walkers Limited, Maryborough between 1955 and 1958. No. 1089 was the last steam engine placed into service on a mainline Australian railway.

Their route availability was always the same as for the BB18¼ and C19. The extremities of that availability when they were introduced were (from Brisbane) Roma, Wallangarra, Merinda (near Bowen), plus branches Bundamba to 3 miles 8 chains (on loop to Redbank), Gowrie to Wyreema loop, Warwick to Thane (South-Western Line), Ipswich to Workshops Gate, South Brisbane to Lota, Kuraby and Corinda, Shorncliffe, Dayboro, Pinkenba, Kilcoy, Brooloo, Byellee (near Gladstone) to Monto and Selene, Bajool to Pt Alma, Rockhampton to Emerald, Dawson and Callide Valley Branches, Townsville to Charters Towers and Babinda, and Merinda to Collinsville. The route availability was extended by track and bridge strengthening- Merinda to Stuart (near Townsville, and Babinda to Cairns (1952), Emerald to Capella and Mackay to Outer Harbour (1956), Emerald to Bogantungan and Charters Towers to Torrens Creek (1957), and Torrens Creek to Hughenden (1958). They were attached to Mayne (Brisbane), Ipswich, Toowoomba, Maryborough, Rockhampton, Mackay and Townsville depots over the years (see J W Knowles, Queensland Railways Steam Locomotives 1900 - 1960, self published, 2002, Appendix 6, p315, Line Standards).

They did the same work throughout their lives as the earlier B18¼, even at the beginning being seen on goods, mixed, suburban and long distance passenger trains. The only difference was that at the beginning, when they were brand new, and in best condition, they were preferred for the long distance passenger work.

== Description ==
The BB18¼ class locomotive is a type of 4-6-2 steam locomotive operated by the Queensland Railways. They were an improved version of the B18¼ class.

Some modifications to the original design were suggested by Vulcan Foundry and subsequently adopted. A number of features, including the mounting of Westinghouse pump on the fireman’s side, stainless steel rather than brass boiler bands, SCOA-P coupled wheels (rather than having traditional solid spokes the SCOA-P spoke is hollow, with a U-shaped cross section and are considerably lighter than a conventional spoked wheel) pressed steel sand box and a larger tender giving an increased coal and water capacity.

Engines constructed by Walkers Limited used electricity for the light on the rear of the tender, for side lamps and to illuminate the motion. All were fitted with roller bearings and chime whistles. The Vulcan-built engines were painted hawthorn green when introduced, the Walkers-built examples in a brighter green.

== Preservation ==
Six have been preserved:

- 1037 by the Mackay Heritage Railway. Ownership passed to DownsSteam in Toowoomba who have completed the restoration. 1037 is now used to haul heritage trains in southern Qld
- 1072 "City of Lithgow" by the Zig Zag Railway, Lithgow, New South Wales
- 1077 at the Waltzing Matilda Centre, Winton as no 1015.
- 1079 by Queensland Rail at the Workshops Rail Museum
- 1086 On display at DownsSteam Toowoomba, awaiting restoration to working condition.
- 1089 by Queensland Rail at the Workshops Rail Museum
