= Zig Zag railway station =

Railway station in New South Wales, Australia

Zig Zag
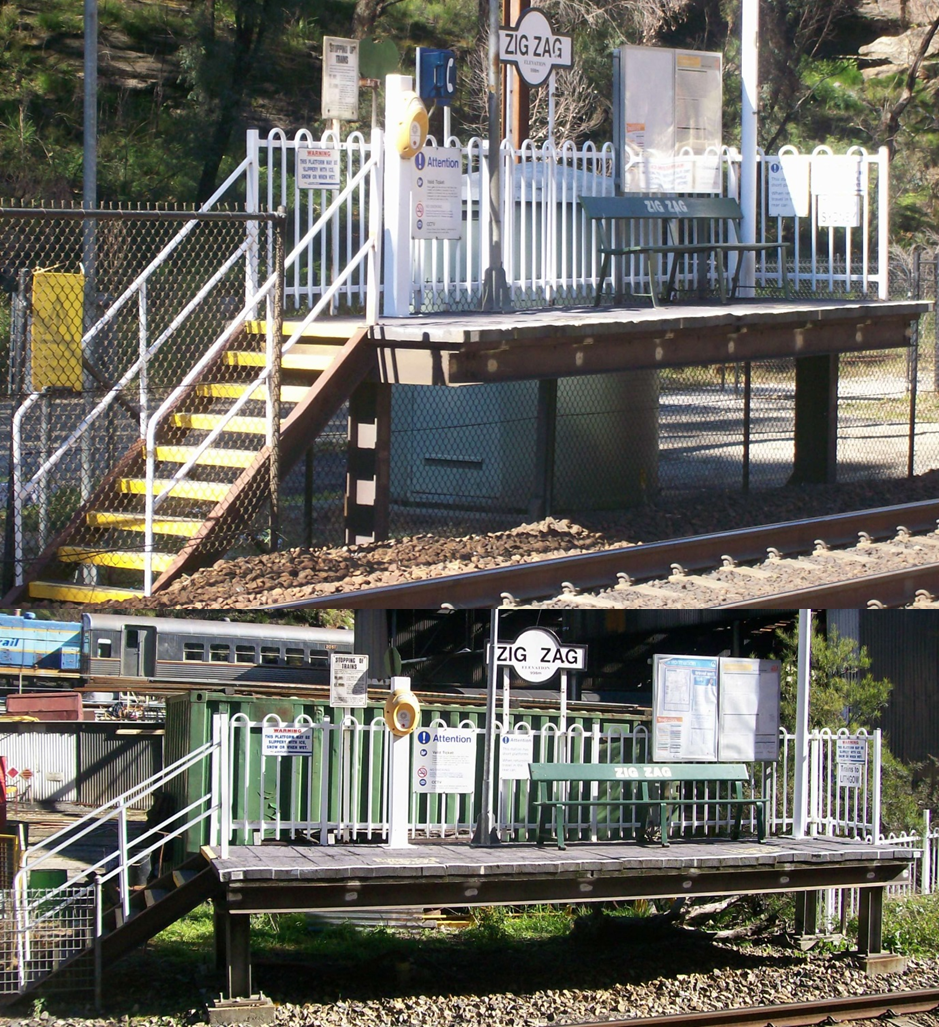
- The two short platforms in 2014

General information
- Location: Abberfield Drive Clarence, via Oakey Park NSW 2790; Australia
- Coordinates: 33°28′14″S 150°12′02″E
- Elevation: 1,006 metres (3,301 ft)
- Owner: Transport Asset Manager of New South Wales
- Line: Main Western
- Distance: 150.94 kilometres (93.79 mi) from Central
- Platforms: 2 side
- Tracks: 2
- Train operators: Sydney Trains

Construction
- Structure type: Ground
- Accessible: No

Other information
- Station code: ZIG
- Website: Transport for NSW

History
- Opened: 15 April 1878
- Closed: 16 October 1910
- Rebuilt: 1959

Passengers
- 2025: 797-1610 (year); 2-4 (daily) (Sydney Trains, NSW TrainLink)

Services
Preceding station	Intercity Trains	Following station
Lithgow Terminus	Blue Mountains Line	Bell towards Central
Former services
Preceding station	Intercity Trains	Following station
Lithgow Terminus	Blue Mountains Line Pre 1975	Clarence towards Central
Location

Zig Zag railway station is located on the New South Wales Main Western Line. It was originally built in April 1878 and closed in 1910 due to the opening of the Ten Tunnels Deviation which bypassed the original site of the station. The station was not rebuilt until 1959 when a new station was built alongside the 1910 alignment in a similar location to the 1878 station.

The station was closed temporarily from December 2019 to May 2020 due to major bushfire damage sustained in the 2019–2020 bushfires.

== Platforms and services ==
Zig Zag has two side platforms, sized at 7 m each. It is serviced by Sydney Trains Blue Mountains Line services travelling from Sydney Central to Lithgow. It is a request stop with passengers required to notify the guard if they wish to alight and signal the driver if they want to board.

Platform	Line	Stopping pattern	Notes
1	Blue Mountains Line	services to Sydney Central	request stop
2	Blue Mountains Line	services to Lithgow	request stop

== Gallery ==
Sign on the station describing how to request a train stops.

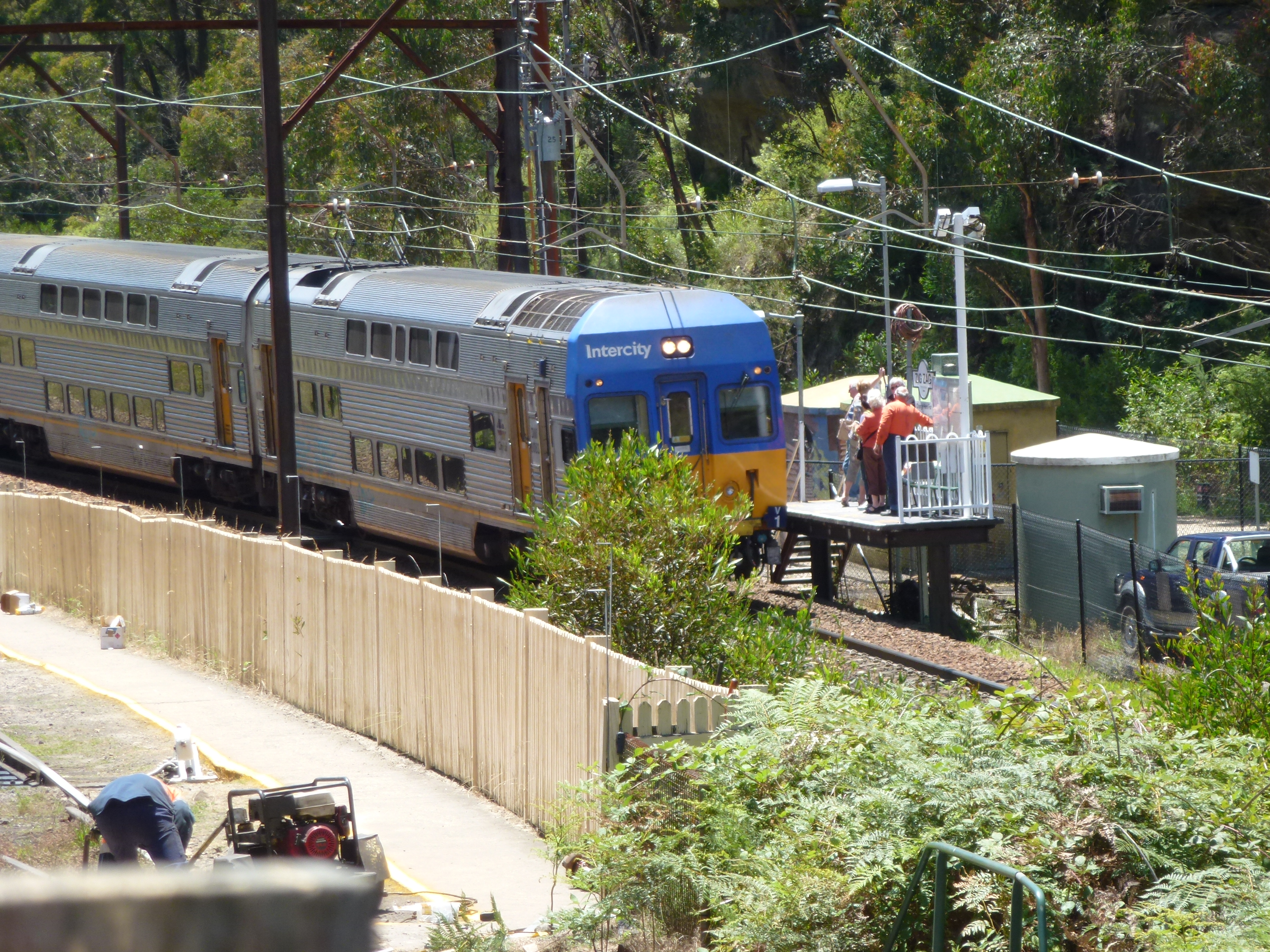
A train from Lithgow stopping at Zig Zag station to pick up eastbound passengers in 2012. The train stops with its last door at the platform.

Zig Zag Station in 2026.
