= Ten Tunnels Deviation =

Heritage listed railway tunnels in New South Wales, Australia

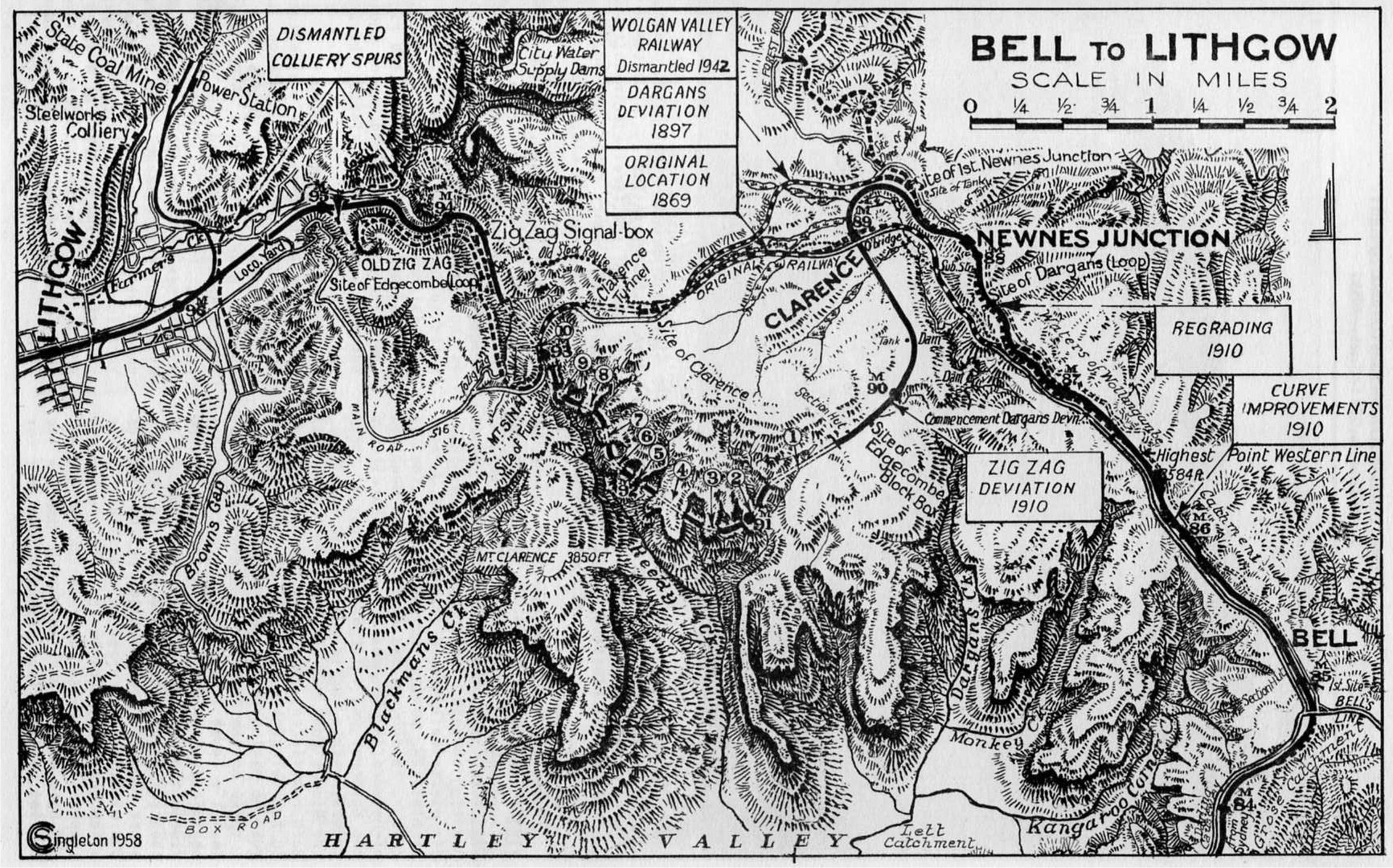
- A 1958 map of the Lithgow Zig Zag and deviation
- Interactive map of Ten Tunnels Deviation

Overview
- Line: Main Western
- Location: Lithgow, New South Wales
- Coordinates: 33°29′33″S 150°13′06″E
- Status: Operating
- Start: Newnes Junction station
- End: Zig Zag station

Operation
- Work began: 1 June 1908
- Opened: 16 October 1910
- Owner: Transport Asset Holding Entity
- Operator: NSW TrainLink

Technical
- Length: Ten tunnels of varying length from 70 to 825 metres (230 to 2,707 ft)
- Line length: 9.2 kilometres (5.7 mi)
- No. of tracks: 2
- Track gauge: 1,435 mm (4 ft 8 1/2 in) standard gauge
- Electrified: 1957
- Grade: 1:90

New South Wales Heritage Register
- Official name: Great Zig Zag Railway deviation tunnels; Bell to Zig Zag Ten Tunnel Railway Deviation
- Type: State heritage (complex / group)
- Criteria: a., c., e., f., g.
- Designated: 2 April 1999
- Reference no.: 1037
- Type: Railway Tunnel
- Category: Transport – Rail
- Builders: NSW Government Railways

The Ten Tunnels Deviation is a heritage-listed 9.2-kilometre (5.7 mi) section of the Main Western Line between Newnes Junction and Zig Zag stations in Lithgow, New South Wales, Australia. It was designed and built by the New South Wales Government Railways and built from 1 June 1908 and 16 October 1910. It is also known as Great Zig Zag Railway deviation tunnels and Bell to Zig Zag Ten Tunnel Railway Deviation. It was added to the New South Wales State Heritage Register on 2 April 1999.

When they opened in 1910, the tunnels replaced the Lithgow Zig Zag, which limited the length of trains over the mountains and required two changes in direction. The deviation comprises ten tunnels of varying length from 70 to 825 metres (230 to 2,707 ft) over 3.7 kilometres (2.3 mi). The work also included the excavation of a 61-metre (200 ft) cutting, the deepest cutting on the NSW rail system. Journey times were reduced by 20 to 30 minutes.

== History ==
The original 1869 Main Western single line headed north from Mount Victoria along the ridge known as the Darling Causeway. It then turned west and entered the Dargan's Creek valley. After climbing out of the head of this valley it reached an escarpment where the Zigzag was constructed to reach the valley floor. The Zig Zag was created by the track switching back on itself twice to reach the valley floor. From here it continued west to Lithgow. This section was opened on 18 October 1869.

The 1869 Zig Zag became a bottleneck to the flow of traffic and as early as 1885, consideration was given to its replacement. In 1897, the first major change was made, known as Dargan's Creek Deviation. This involved traversing the Dargan's Creek Valley on the northern side of the creek instead of the south. The line was still single-track at this point, and this soon became a bottleneck. In order to alleviate this, electric staff crossing loops were added at Edgecombe in 1901 (between Clarence and Top Points) and Dargan's in 1902 (between Bell and Clarence).

In 1906, a new junction and station were constructed at the first Newnes Junction Station. The junction was for the private Newnes railway line.

By 1910, it had become evident that a new route was required for the descent to Lithgow. Accordingly, a new route, known as the Ten Tunnels Deviation, was built and the Dargan's Creek Deviation was closed. The existing stations were all closed, with Newnes Junction relocated closer to Sydney, and a new Clarence station built where the line goes under the Bells Line of Road. The Newnes Line closed after 25 years of operation in 1932, and only the formation remains.

The Ten Tunnel Deviation started at Newnes Junction and finished at Bottom Points (now Zig Zag platform). As its name suggests, it featured 10 new tunnels, and it bypassed the Zig Zag. The new route broadly followed the previous one as far as Newnes Junction, before turning south and taking a more circuitous route via the tunnels to emerge from the final one near the base of the Zig Zag.

Supplies to the line during construction were provided by a funicular railway that descended 107 metres (350 ft) from the ridge to a location near No. 10 tunnel. Up to 1500 day employees worked on the project.

The deviation was part of the duplication of the Main Western Railway between Penrith and Lithgow. Upon completion the deviation comprised ten tunnels of varying length from 70 to 825 metres (77 to 902 yd). The work also included the excavation of the deepest cutting of 61 metres (200 ft) on the NSW rail system. Journey times were reduced by 20 to 30 minutes. Also, the gradient was reduced from 1 in 42 to 1 in 90, thereby allowing a doubling in the loads of trains.

In 1972, a group of enthusiasts formed the Zig Zag Cooperative, and took over the track between the original Clarence station and Bottom Points, and today the Zig Zag Railway is a successful tourist operation based at the restored Clarence station. A new Cityrail platform, Zig Zag was constructed on the Main Western line to allow public transport access to the Zig Zag. The previous stations at Newnes Junction and Clarence have closed, with little trace of the latter remaining.

== Construction ==
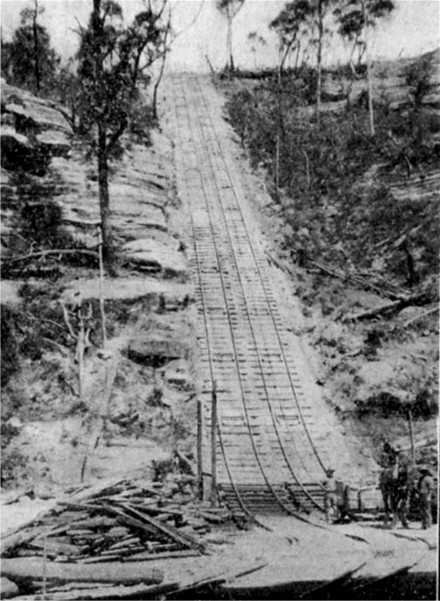
A funicular rail line was used for supplies.

The Act approving the construction of the double-line deviation was passed by the New South Wales Parliament in December 1906. Construction started near the former Oakey Park Colliery on the 1 in 42 Bottom Road, which had already been duplicated in 1880. It eventually passed Bottom Points before entering a series of ten tunnels. Originally eleven were planned, but one of them was opened out instead, owing to the discovery of rock faults, leaving the deepest cutting on the New South Wales rail system. The headquarters for the works was at nearby Clarence, where many of the navvies were temporarily housed. Here a temporary power station was established for rock drills, lighting, compressors, etc.

Access to the tunnel locations and the short open sections between the cliffs was extremely difficult. At one isolated point, horses and drays were placed on to the worksite by means of a crane and long jibs. There they remained until the tunnels were completed to provide them with a way out. The supply of materials for tunnels 8, 9 and 10 was expedited by the construction of a 110-metre (350 ft) funicular of the 4-rail type from near Mount Sinai on the original line. Only experienced miners were employed on the more dangerous tunnelling activities, which were carried out by day and night; with approximately 1,500 employees working each day.

The tunnels were situated on a maximum grade of 1 in 90. The line curves towards Newnes Junction after leaving the tunnels at the eastern end. Newnes Junction also had to be moved 660 metres (2,170 ft) to its current place, and two more tracks were also constructed for the Commonwealth Oil Corporation's Newnes railway line. When the deviation was completed, much of the equipment was moved to the deviation of the Lapstone Zig Zag, as well as the navvies. As a result, the population of Clarence declined rapidly.

The deviation was electrified along with the rest of the line in 1957. In 1978, the roadbed of the Ten Tunnels was lowered to allow double deck V sets to operate on the line. In 2018, modifications are planned to accommodate the D sets.

== Description ==
The deviation comprises ten tunnels of varying length from 70 to 825 metres (77 to 902 yd) that carry the double-track 1,435 mm (4 ft 8 1/2 in) standard gauge Main Western line between Newnes Junction and Lithgow Zig Zag stations. The work also included the excavation of the deepest cutting of 61 metres (200 ft) on the New South Wales rail system. The tunnels are numbered from the Sydney end of the deviation. The tunnel portals are elliptically shaped with concrete used for floor and up to the start of the arch and brickwork for the arches. The tunnels are of masonry (brick) construction.

=== Condition ===
As at 28 April 2010, generally good condition. A 2007 structural report notes the following:

- No. 1, 3, 4 tunnel water seepage,
- No. 6 hairline cracks at Sydney end,
- No. 9 hairline cracks and water stains,
- No. 10 water seepage from crown.

The Ten Tunnel Deviation is intact and has high integrity.

=== Modifications and dates ===
- 1952: Land was acquired for a further deviation between Bottom Points (now Zig Zag platform) and Coal Stage signal box in Lithgow but electrification in 1957 eliminated the need for the deviation.
- 1978: The conventional use of individual track sleepers in all tunnels was replaced by a continuous concrete bed and was upgraded in 2002/03.

== Heritage listing ==
As at 28 April 2010, the Ten Tunnel Deviation is of state significance due to its historical associations with the second phase of railway crossing across the Great Dividing Range. It is of a high level of technical significance as a large scale engineering achievement of the early 20th century including excavation of the deepest cutting on the NSW rail system. The project was one of the great railway deviations constructed throughout NSW, and was a success in reducing both journey time and track gradient, and continues to be in use today. The tunnels form part of a larger railway landscape in the Lithgow area and across the Blue Mountains including the Zig Zag railway, Dargan's Creek Deviation, Eskbank Goods Yard and the State Mine Colliery railway.

Ten Tunnels Deviation was listed on the New South Wales State Heritage Register on 2 April 1999 having satisfied the following criteria.

The place is important in demonstrating the course, or pattern, of cultural or natural history in New South Wales.

The Ten Tunnel Deviation is historically significant as the second phase of the Great Dividing Range railway crossing. The project was one of the great railway deviations and is still in use today. The tunnels form part of a larger railway landscape in the Lithgow area and across the Blue Mountains including the Zig Zag railway, Dargan's Creek Deviation, Eskbank Goods Yard and the State Mine Colliery railway.

The place is important in demonstrating aesthetic characteristics and/or a high degree of creative or technical achievement in New South Wales.

The Ten Tunnel Deviation illustrates high level technical achievement for tunnelling, engineering and railway building practices. The work included excavation of the deepest cutting on the NSW rail system. The construction involved up to 1500 employees per day. It resulted in journey times reduced by 30 minutes and the track gradient reduced from 1 in 41 to 1 in 90 which allowed a doubling in the load of trains.

The place has potential to yield information that will contribute to an understanding of the cultural or natural history of New South Wales.

The Ten Tunnel Deviation has research significance in providing evidence on the techniques of tunnel construction in the first decade of the 1900s.

The place possesses uncommon, rare or endangered aspects of the cultural or natural history of New South Wales.

The Ten Tunnel Deviation is a major engineering achievement in the early 1900s and is rare in this regard.

The place is important in demonstrating the principal characteristics of a class of cultural or natural places/environments in New South Wales.

The Bell to Zig Zag Ten Tunnel Deviation is representative of brick-arch construction used for tunnelling during the early 20th century railway deviations in NSW.

== See also ==
- List of tunnels in Australia
