= Newnes railway line =

Former railway line in New South Wales, Australia

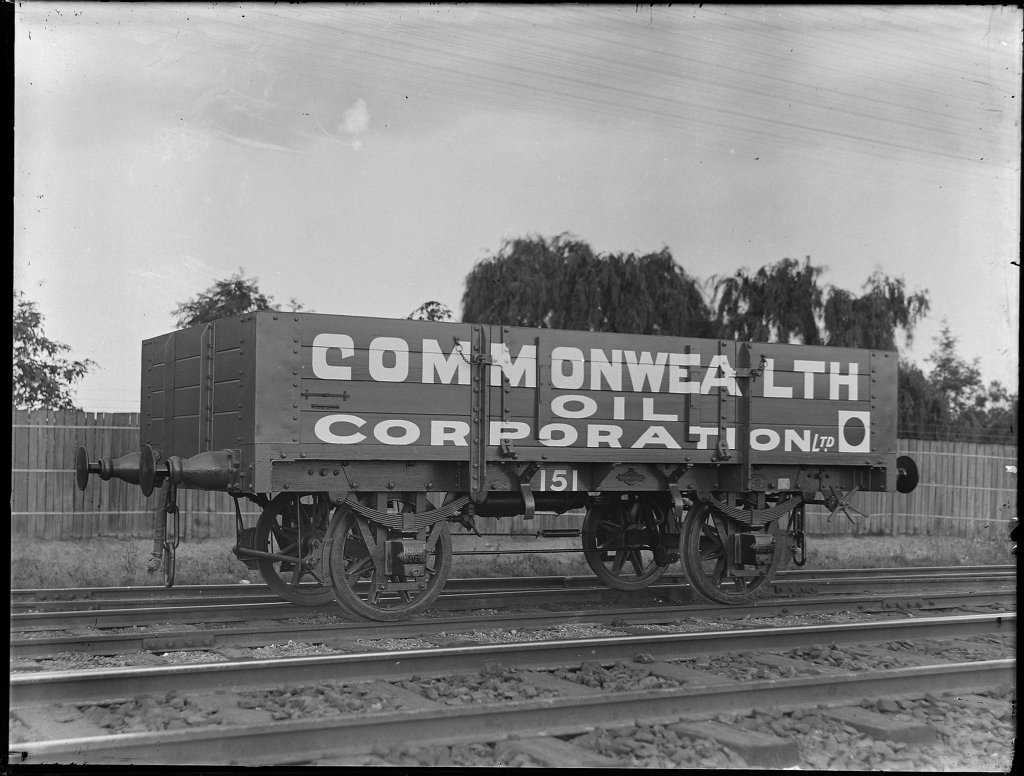
- Commonwealth Oil Corporation goods wagon

Overview
- Termini: Newnes Junction; Newnes
- Stations: 4

Service
- Operator: Commonwealth Oil Corporation

History
- Opened: 1907
- Closed: 1932

Technical
- Line length: 32 mi (51 km)
- Number of tracks: 1
- Track gauge: 4 ft 8 1/2 in (1,435 mm) standard gauge

The Newnes railway line (also called Wolgan Valley Railway) is a closed and dismantled railway line in New South Wales, Australia. The line ran for 32 mi (51 km) from the Main Western line to the township of Newnes. Along the way, it passed through a tunnel now known as the Glowworm Tunnel, because it is famous for its glow-worms. The tunnel is now contained within the Wollemi National Park.

== Description and history ==
The line was constructed and operated by the Commonwealth Oil Corporation for their Newnes Oil Shale mine. Surveying and construction was overseen by Henry Deane. The line opened in 1907 and closed in 1932. It was primarily intended to carry goods to and from the mine, but also provided passenger services.

The New South Wales Division of Australian Railway Historical Society published The Shale Railways of New South Wales in 1974 which includes a detailed history of this line.

Allan Watson, the Lessee of the old Newnes Hotel, has a comprehensive website here.

The steep 1 in 25 (4%) gradients along the descent towards Newnes required a different type of steam locomotive. 4 Shay locomotives were imported from the Lima Locomotive Works in the USA. Although rather slow, their unique build which uses crankshafts to propel the wheels made them very suitable, and if a train had to stop on a steep uphill grade, the train could easily start again and keep moving.

After the line closed, part of its route was used by a section of the pipeline that carried refined petroleum from the Glen Davis Shale Oil Works to Newnes Junction.

In 1940–1941, the rails were lifted; most were shipped to North Africa for use as anti-tank traps and gun emplacement reinforcements but some of the bullhead rails were reused for structures and supports of the oil pipeline. Other iron fittings from the line were used as scrap for munitions.

== See also ==
- Blue Mountains walking tracks
- Newnes glow worm tunnel
- Rail rollingstock in New South Wales
- Rail trail
- Rail transport in New South Wales
