= Bell, New South Wales =

Coordinates: 33.514°S 150.279°E

Bell
- Town
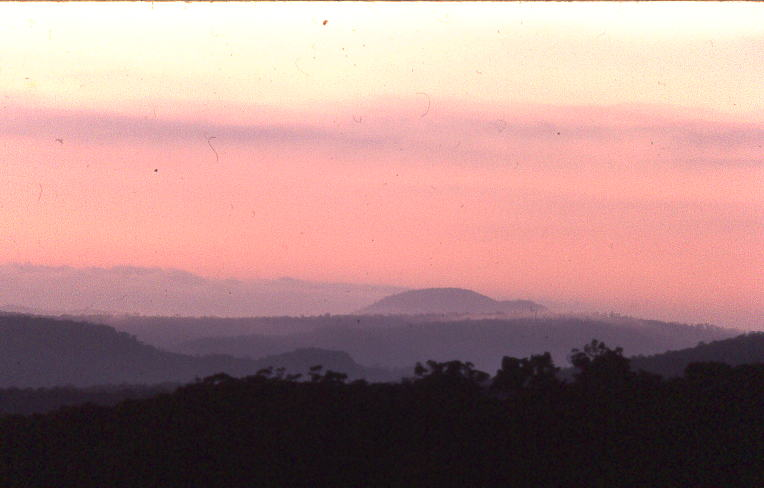
- Dawn, Wollangambe River area
- Country: Australia
- State: New South Wales
- LGA(s): City of Blue Mountains; City of Lithgow
- Location: 125 km (78 mi) W of Sydney CBD; 10 km (6.2 mi) N of Mount Victoria; 20 km (12 mi) E of Lithgow
- Established: 1875

Government
  - State electorate(s): Blue Mountains
  - Federal division(s): Macquarie (formerly Calare)
- Elevation: 1,100 m (3,600 ft)

Population
  - Total(s): 44 (2021 census)
- Postcode: 2786
Localities around Bell
Dargan	Wolgan Valley	Mount Wilson
Clarence	Bell	Mount Wilson
Hartley Vale	Mount Victoria	Mount Banks

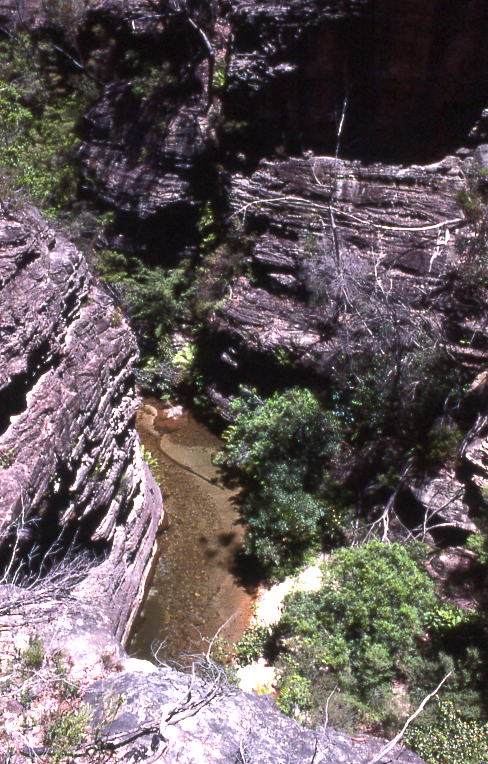
Wollangambe River

Bell (postcode: 2786) is a small rural and residential village in the Blue Mountains region of New South Wales, Australia. It is the north-westernmost village in the City of Blue Mountains, located approximately 125 kilometres (78 mi) west of Sydney central business district by road or 137 kilometres (85 mi) by rail, approximately 20 kilometres (12 mi) east of Lithgow and 10 kilometres (6.2 mi) north of Mount Victoria. It is a locality on the junction of the Bells Line of Road, Chifley Road and the Darling Causeway, with an elevation of approximately 1,100 metres (3,600 ft) AHD.

== Description and history ==
Bell is named after Archibald Bell, Jr., who was the first colonial man to map the route over the Blue Mountains via Richmond. This crossing had been partly explored by colonial explorer George Caley, who went as far as Mount Banks in 1804, but Bell was the first colonial explorer to go the whole way from the Richmond area to the Bell area thanks to Indigenous guides, Darug men Emery and Cogy, who were already quite familiar with the route. The Bells Line of Road was later established along this route.

Bell is on the Main Western railway line. The railway station was built in 1875 to service the village of Mount Wilson, some 14 kilometres (8.7 mi) from Bell. Bell railway station was originally named Mount Wilson railway station. Bell railway station is 1,060 metres (3,480 ft) above sea level.

The area has a small number of properties with an average size of approximately 4 hectares (9.9 acres), and in surrounding areas are various walking tracks, (some in the national park and some on private property) which give views of the Hartley Valley, Wollangambe Wilderness and surrounding areas. Bell is entirely surrounded by native bush, most of which is part of the Blue Mountains National Park. This section of the park is dominated by the Wollangambe River, which begins north of Bell and flows to the Colo River. The area is rugged, stony country with few tracks. A walking trail from Bell gives access to the Wollangambe River and is used as a starting point by experienced bushwalkers venturing into the Wollangambe Wilderness.

Bell enjoys a cool mountain climate, with snow falls occurring most years. Bell's average winter (July) minimum temperature is 2.3 °C (36.1 °F) with an average maximum of 9.3 °C (48.7 °F). In summer, Bell enjoys considerably cooler temperatures than the nearby Sydney basin, with an average maximum of 23.7 °C (74.7 °F) in January. Hot westerly winds can cause the temperature to occasionally rise to the range of 34 to 37 °C (93 to 99 °F).

As Bell's Line of Road is the only alternative route to the Great Western Highway over the Blue Mountains, Bell is the site of an RTA Heavy Vehicle Checking Station.
