= Newnes Junction railway station =

Former railway station in New South Wales, Australia

Newnes Junction (1st)

General information
- Coordinates: 33°28′24″S 150°15′02″E
- Lines: Dargans Deviation 1897; Newnes railway line
- Platforms: 1
- Tracks: 2

Other information
- Status: Closed

History
- Opened: 16 October 1905
- Closed: 12 June 1911
Location

Newnes Junction (2nd)
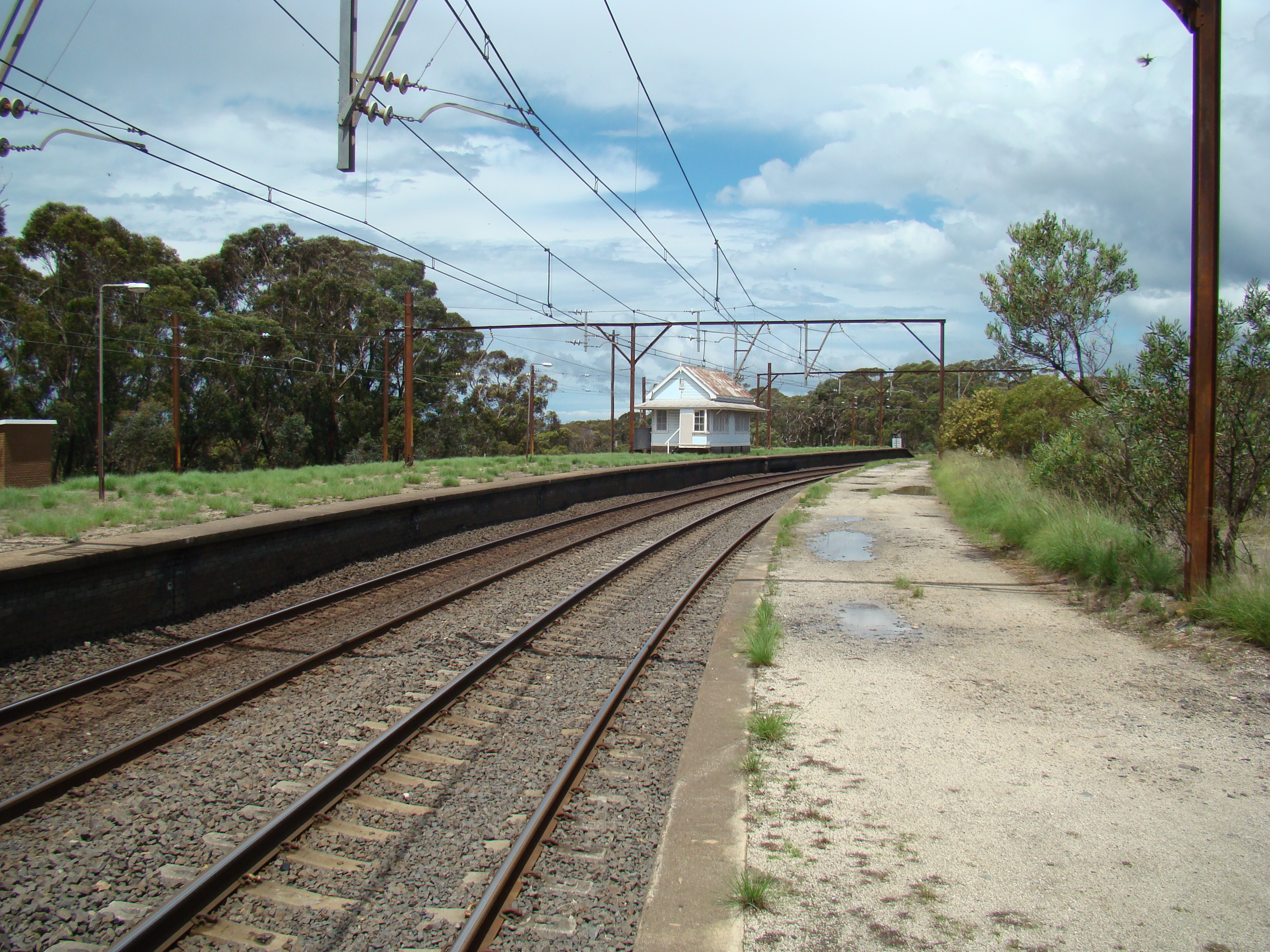
- Newnes Junction station from down platform looking north east in January 2010

General information
- Coordinates: 33°28′24″S 150°15′02″E
- Line: Blue Mountains Line
- Platforms: 3
- Tracks: 3 + siding

Other information
- Status: Closed to passengers part of the loading loop for Centennial Coal

History
- Opened: 16 October 1910
- Closed: 6 April 1975

Services
Preceding station	NSW TrainLink	Following station
Clarence towards Lithgow	Blue Mountains Line Pre 1975	Bell towards Central
Location

The Newnes Junction railway station is a closed railway station on the Blue Mountains Line, New South Wales, Australia. It served the former private branch line to Newnes. The station closed to passenger services in 1975, although it still physically exists and is occasionally used for coal trains visiting the nearby Clarence Colliery. The station consists of an island "up" platform, and a single side "down" platform.

== History ==
The first station was finished around 1906 at the time of the Newnes railway line. This station was located at the junction of the Dargans Creek deviation and the Newnes railway line (or Wolgan Valley Railway), which is situated about 500 metres (550 yd) north west of the current Newnes Junction Station. After the Zig Zag deviation was completed the station was no longer needed for passenger services but stayed in use to finalise the recovery of parts from the Zig Zag and Clarence area along the Dargans Deviation.

The second station (also called "Newnes Junction") replaced the earlier station which operated from 1906 to 1910. The Wolgan Valley Railway closed in 1932 and for years the station had no use at all until the construction of the loop line that served the Clarence Colliery in the 1970s.

In 1957 electrification crossed the Blue Mountains and the sidings and colliery loop were electrified. In 2006 the overhead catenary was decommissioned and was removed from the colliery balloon loop.

The station was burnt to the ground resulting from the 2019 Gospers Mountain fire.
