= Clarence railway station =

Former railway station in New South Wales, Australia

Clarence (1st and 2nd)
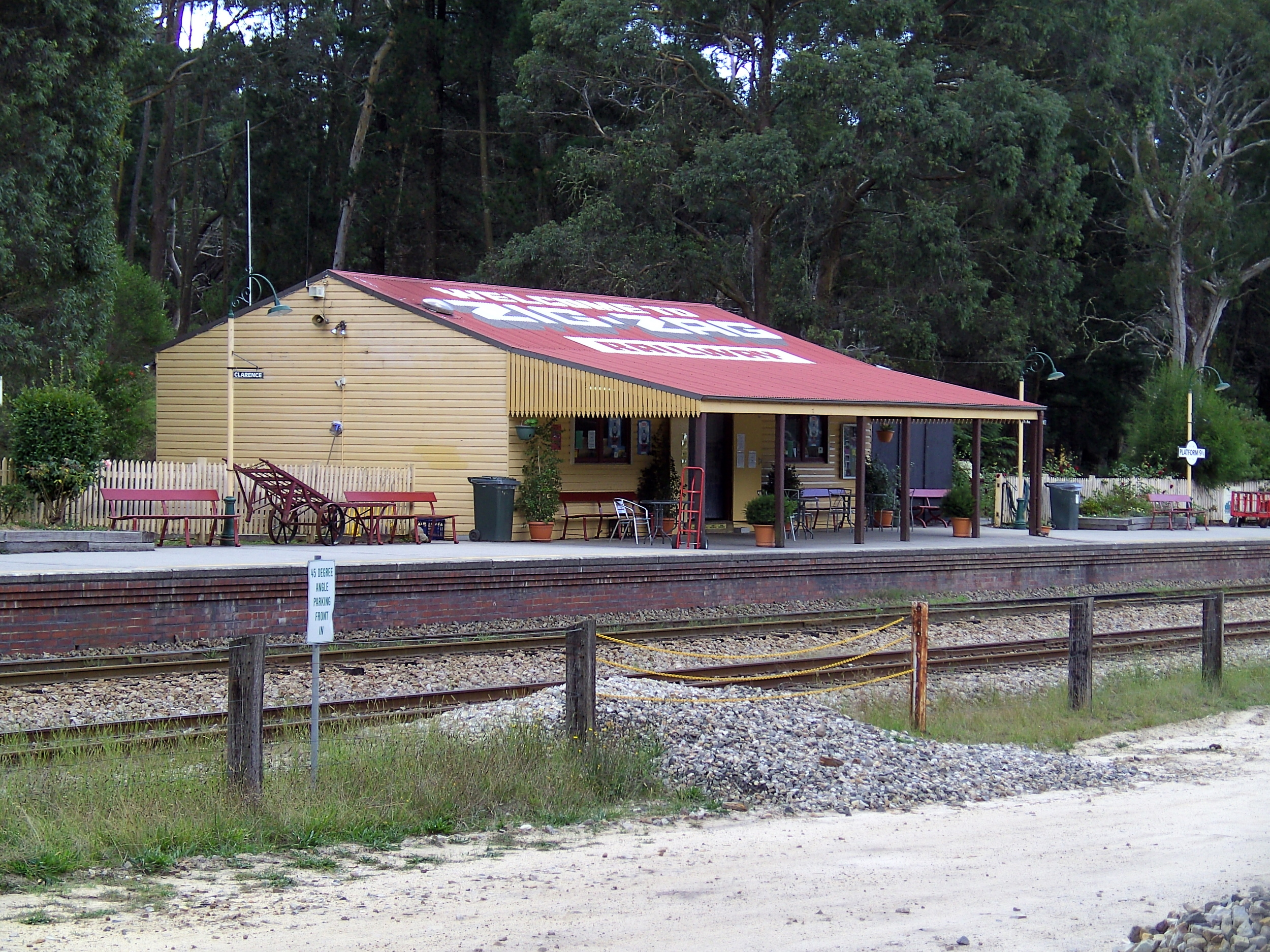

General information
- Lines: Zig Zag Railway line, New South Wales
- Platforms: 1 side platform
- Tracks: 2

Other information
- Status: Reused

History
- Opened: 1874, rebuilt 1896–1897
- Closed: 16 October 1910 – Re-used 1988

Services
Preceding station	Zig Zag Railway	Following station
Top Points towards Bottom Points	Zig Zag Railway	Terminus
Location

Clarence (3rd)

General information
- Line: Blue Mountains Line
- Platforms: 2 side platforms
- Tracks: 2

Other information
- Status: Closed

History
- Opened: 16 October 1910
- Closed: 21 September 1974
Location

Clarence is a railway station on the Blue Mountains section of the Main Western railway line in New South Wales, Australia. It opened in 1874 on the original alignment from Bell to the Clarence Tunnel. With the opening of Dargan's Deviation, it was rebuilt to its second location.

When the Ten Tunnels Deviation was completed in 1910, the (third) station was rebuilt on the new line (adjacent to the Chifley Road bridge) but was closed in 1974. Little trace of this third station now remains.

The second station site has been re-used by the Zig Zag Railway (heritage railway) for its upper passenger connection point and car park.

== Sites ==
- Current - 33.477594°S 150.220823°E
- 10 Tunnels - 33.472348°S 150.239435°E
