= Lapstone Zig Zag =

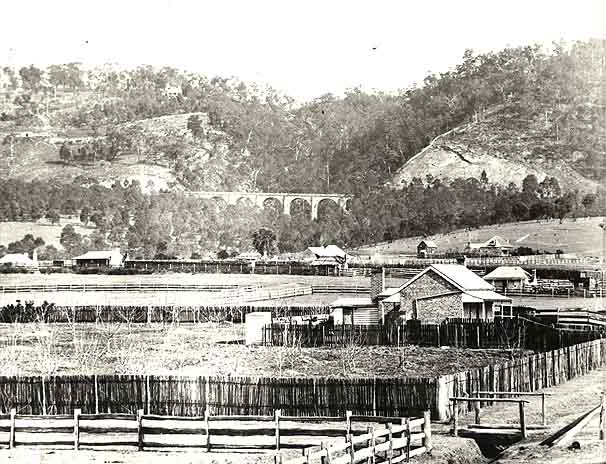
- View from Emu Plains, New South Wales

Overview
- Status: Main Western Line subsequently diverted; this section closed
- Owner: NSW Government Railways
- Locale: Western Sydney, New South Wales, Australia
- Coordinates: 33°45′52″S 150°38′22″E
- Termini: Knapsack Viaduct (east); Glenbrook Station (west)
- Stations: Lucasville

Service
- Type: Heavy rail
- System: NSW Government Railways

History
- Opened: 1867
- Closed: 18 December 1892

Technical
- Number of tracks: Single
- Character: Zig zag railway line (subsequently diverted); Sections repurposed as the Great Western Highway; Subsequent use as a walking track
- Track gauge: 4 ft 8 1/2 in (1,435 mm) standard gauge
- Highest elevation: c. 167 metres (548 ft) (Glenbrook (1st))

New South Wales Heritage Database (Local Government Register)
- Official name: Lapstone Zig Zag; Lapstone Zig Zag Railway; Skarratt Park
- Type: Local heritage (built)
- Designated: 27 December 1991
- Reference no.: G024
- Type: Walking track and park; Former railway line
- Category: Transport – Land
- Builder: William Watkins

The Lapstone Zig Zag was a zig zag railway built between Emu Plains and Blaxland stations on the Main Western Line of New South Wales in Australia. Constructed between 1863 and 1865 to overcome an otherwise insurmountable climb up the eastern side of the Blue Mountains, the zig zag and associated Knapsack Viaduct, a sandstone arch viaduct, were designed by John Whitton, Engineer-in-Charge of New South Wales Government Railways, and were built by William Watkins. The zig zag was listed on the Blue Mountains local government heritage register on 27 December 1991; while the adjacent Knapsack Viaduct was listed on the New South Wales Heritage Database on 2 April 1999. The Lapstone Zig Zag was the world-first Zig Zag constructed on any main-line railway.

The ruling grade was already very steep at 1 in 33 (3%). Another of the early plans had been to build the whole line across the Blue Mountains on a completely different route through the Grose Valley with a 3-kilometre-long (1.9 mi) tunnel, but this was beyond the resources of the colony of New South Wales at the time. The track included the Knapsack Viaduct and the subsequently abandoned Lucasville station, opened in 1877.

The zig zag closed in 1892 when the Main Western line was diverted via the Glenbrook Deviation and subsequently sections of the line were repurposed as the Great Western Highway, and later use as a walking track.

== History ==
=== Nineteenth century ===
The contract to build this railway from Penrith as far as Valley Heights, which included building the Knapsack Viaduct and the Lapstone Zig Zag, was awarded to William Watkins in March 1863 but was completed eighteen months behind schedule in December 1865. It opened for traffic in 1867.

Once the westbound train had crossed Knapsack Viaduct, it entered the Bottom Road of the Zig Zag. There were points where the Middle Road cut backwards and sharply upwards to form the middle stroke of the Z. Beyond the points, Bottom Road extended an additional 162 metres (532 ft) to a dead-end. It was in this area that the train stopped before it reversed direction to climb Middle Road. Similarly at the junction of Middle and Top Roads, Top Road continued some distance to buffers on the edge of Knapsack Gorge. Here the train again reversed its direction to resume the journey over the Blue Mountains. Lucasville Station was completed in 1877 on the extension section of Top Road. In 1886 the line of the Top Road extension was remodelled with a new parallel, more steeply sloped line to the west. Both of the lines of the Top Road extension are clearly legible.

The line of track (now without rails) goes through well executed rock cuttings on the standard walk along Top Road from Knapsack Street and Skarratt Park. There is a pleasing stone culvert to the south of Lucasville platform. Lucasville station was built in 1877 for the Minister for Mines, John Lucas who had a holiday home nearby. The culvert, which is still in operation, utilises a rock-cutting on the west side to divert run-off water deep under the track in a square channel constructed of stone blocks. The water then runs down a steep gully to the east. To the west of the Upper Road there is a series of low sandstone terrace walls which probably marked the boundary between Lucasville estate and the railway. The Zig Zag is largely surrounded by bushland, interspersed with impressive views east to Sydney. The setting provides a striking sense of the nineteenth-century journey over the mountains as the traveller was entering into a wilderness. At the southern entry to the Top Road of the Zig Zag, at the end of Knapsack Street, there is a gate to inhibit vehicle access. Just beside this gate, on the northern side, there are four surviving sleepers and metal spikes, all that survives from the original railway track.

The rail route across the mountains extended as far as Wentworth Falls (then called "Weatherboard") by 1867 but the Lapstone Zig Zag, which included Lucasville station, soon ran into problems: the length of the top points and bottom points limited the length of trains and the single track meant that trains travelling in opposite directions had to stop at crossing points. The first crossing point after Lapstone Zig Zag was at Wascoe's Siding at what is now Glenbrook station.

The Lapstone Zig Zag was the first Zig Zag constructed on any main-line railway anywhere in the world. The idea on which Whitton built came from the Indian railways. A friend of his, Solomon Tredwell, had in 1859 started the construction of half a Zig Zag (with a reversing line and stone viaducts) at Bhore Ghat on the Bombay to Poona line. Although Tredwell died in 1859, his widow saw the half Zig Zag to completion in 1863, employing 42,000 men, and this feat was reported at some length in The Sydney Morning Herald on 3 July 1863. Whitton knew of the conquering of the Bhore Ghat, which posed problems very comparable to the Lapstone Monocline, both from personal and public communications. The way in which he adapted the Indian experience into a full Zig Zag, approached over an exquisite, and very cheap, sandstone viaduct, was a substantial feat in world terms of railway engineering.

The single track contributed to a fatal accident at Emu Plains in 1878 where eastbound and westbound goods trains collided.

In 1890 signal boxes were built at both Lower and Upper Points of the Zig Zag, this was to replace the operation of pointsmen using hand levers.

==== The Glenbrook tunnel deviation ====
Arthur Streeton's Fire's On

Commissioner of Railways, E. M. Eddy, decided that the ZigZag should be replaced by the deviation including a tunnel, both built around 1890. The Lapstone Zig Zag and Lucasville station were officially closed on 18 December 1892 and the rails were raised, after the completion of the Glenbrook Tunnel Deviation. The Deviation soon experienced problems as it was built at the same too steep grade as the Zig Zag which caused the locomotives to slip in the tunnel, mostly due to water leaking onto the tunnel floor from nearby creek, and smoke also became a problem for uphill trains, as the tunnel was not designed to vent the smoke.

The building of the tunnel is the subject of Arthur Streeton's famous painting Fire's On.

=== Twentieth century ===
By 1910, the line as a whole was being duplicated (made into double track) and the "rathole" tunnel was replaced on a different deviation with a gentler alignment with 1 in 60 (1.67%) grades and the new Glenbrook Tunnel at Bluffs point on the Glenbrook Creek escarpment. From then on the lower section of the track, including the historic Knapsack Gully Viaduct, was converted into a road, the Great Western Highway, the main road up the Lapstone hill until the M4 motorway replaced it in 1993. The older tunnel was converted for mushroom growing but was also used by the RAAF for storage during World War II. During 1943 to 1946 the 660-metre-long (2,165 ft) Glenbrook tunnel stored chemical weapons, mainly of bulk drums of mustard. Today the Zig Zag, Knapsack Viaduct, The Old Glenbook Tunnel, and Lucasville station can all be accessed by walking tracks.

== Present day ==
The line of the old track and cuttings (including the long-abandoned platform of Lucasville station), and the old Knapsack Gully bridge is now a popular bushwalking track. Although the original tunnel is closed, there is also a bush walk that will take you close to its entrance.

== Gallery ==
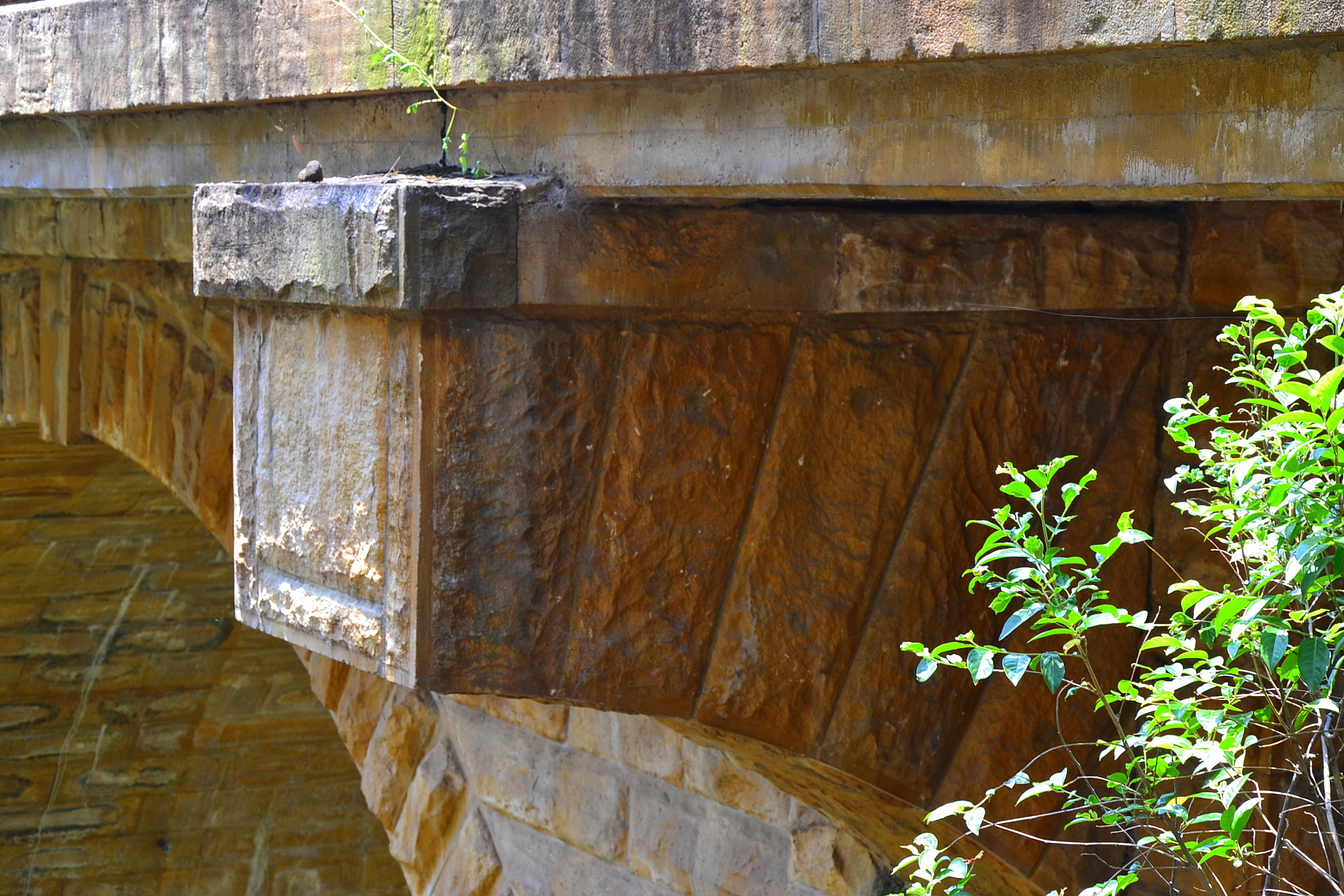
Knapsack Viaduct, detail

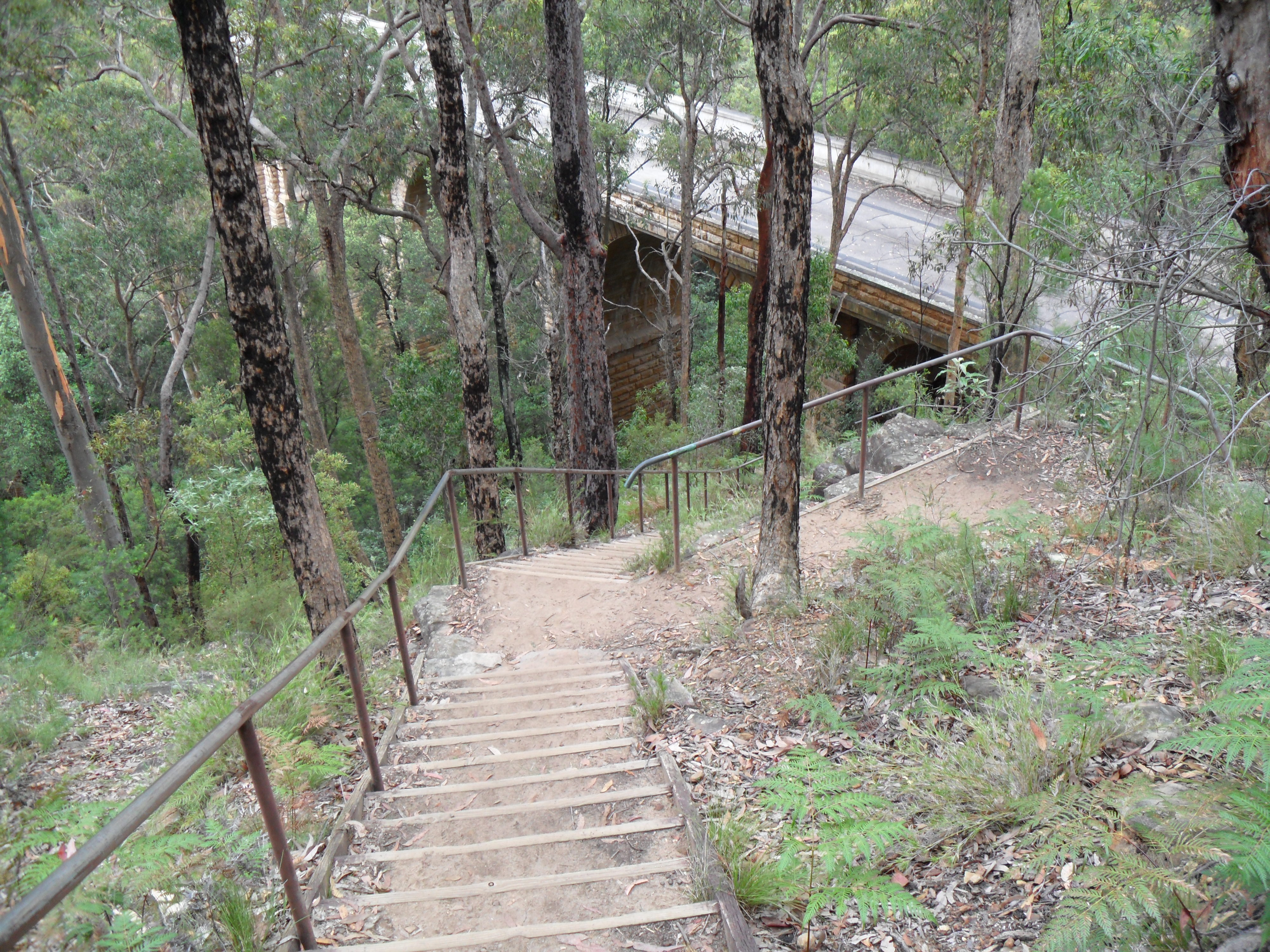
Stairway descent to viaduct from Siding Lookout

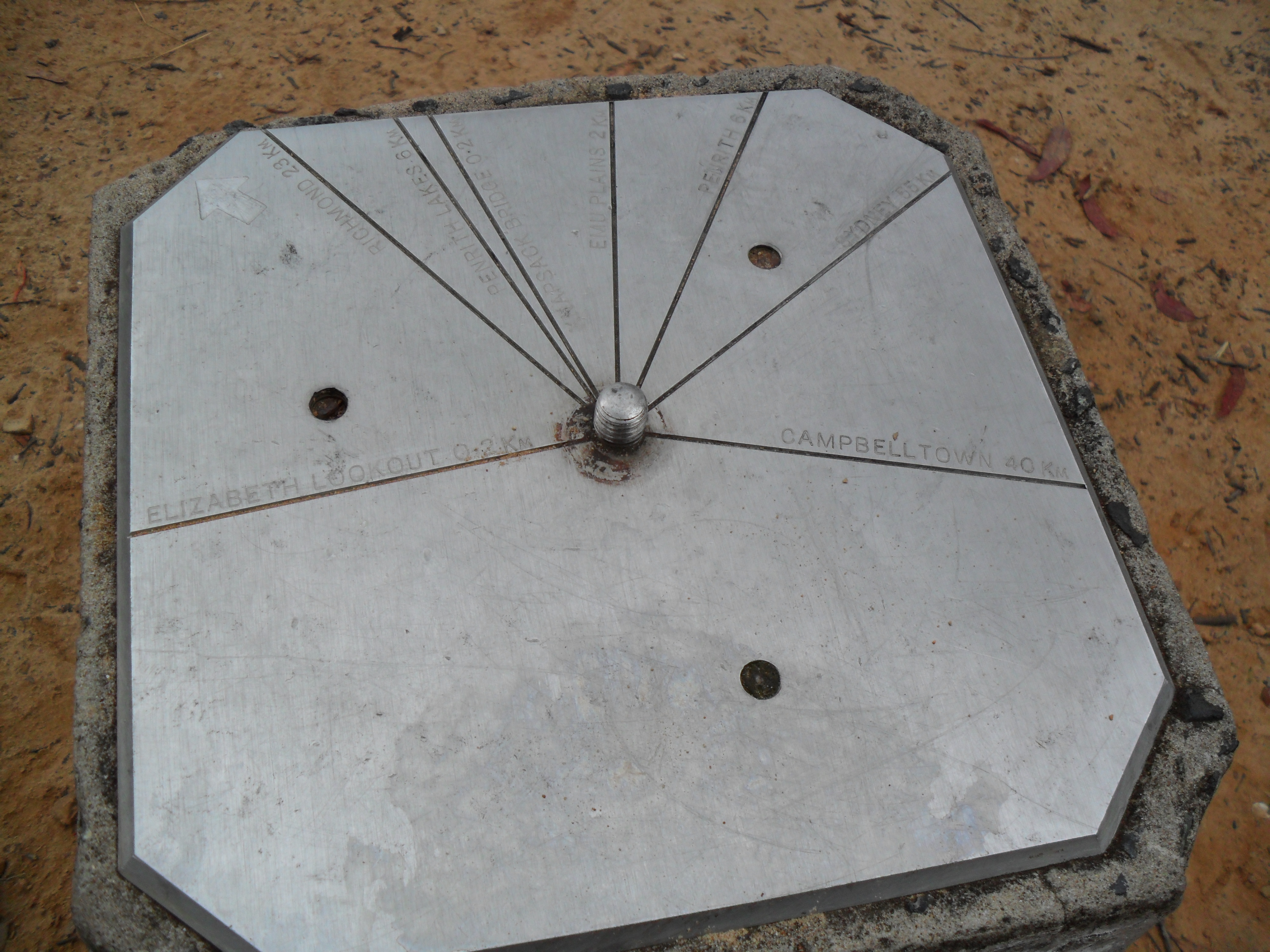
Marker plate on trig. point, indicating distances.

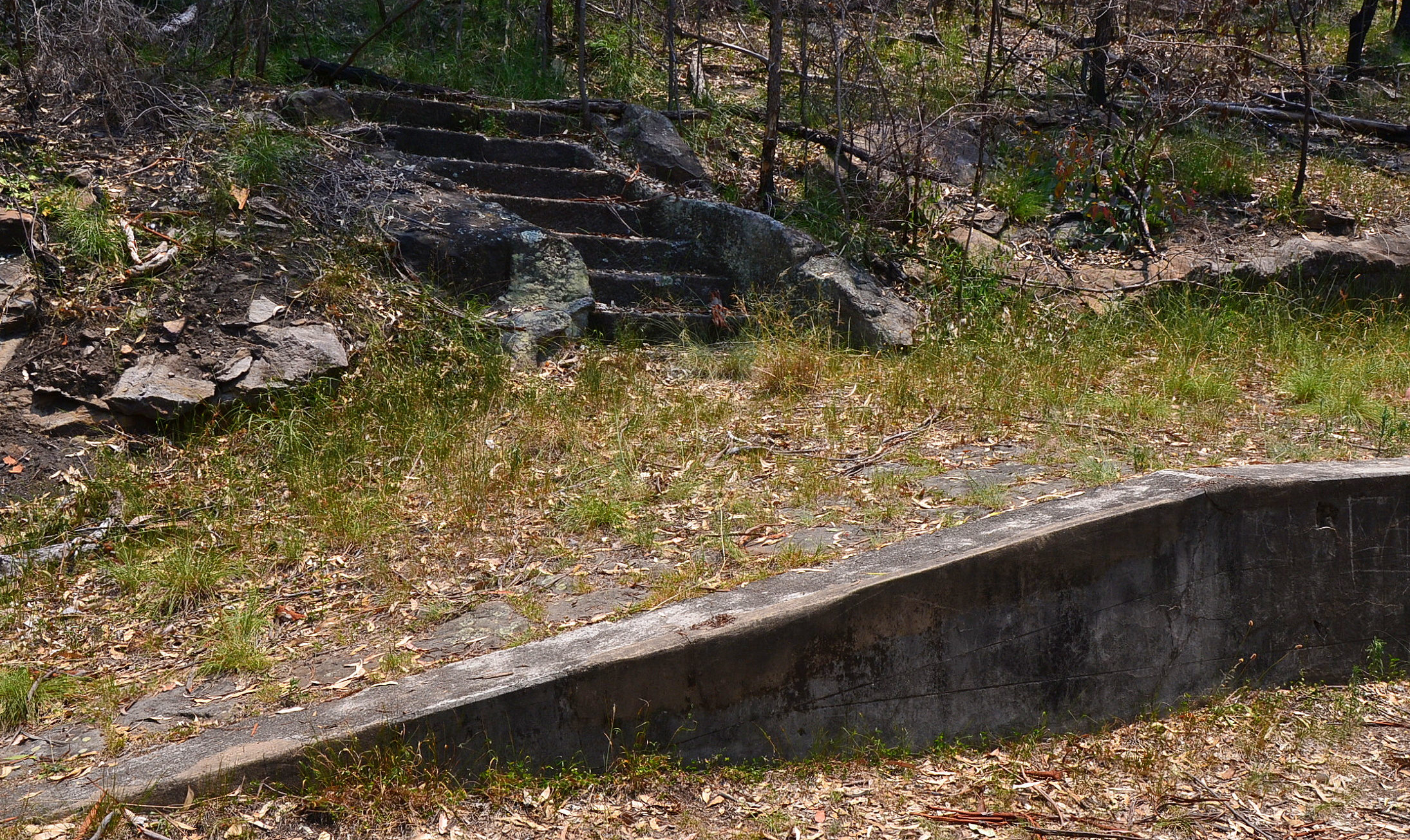
Remains of Lucasville Station and steps

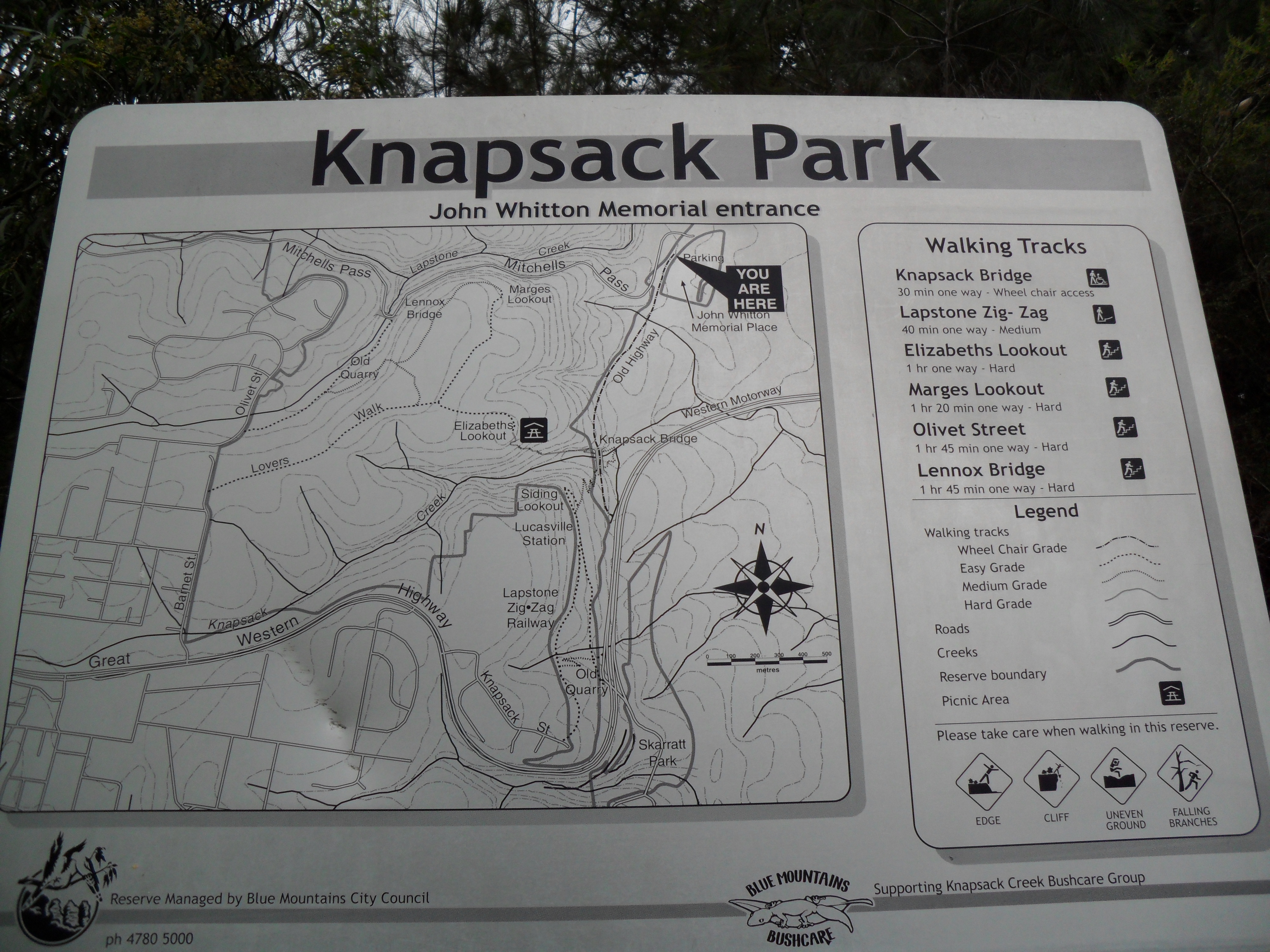
Knapsack Park guide

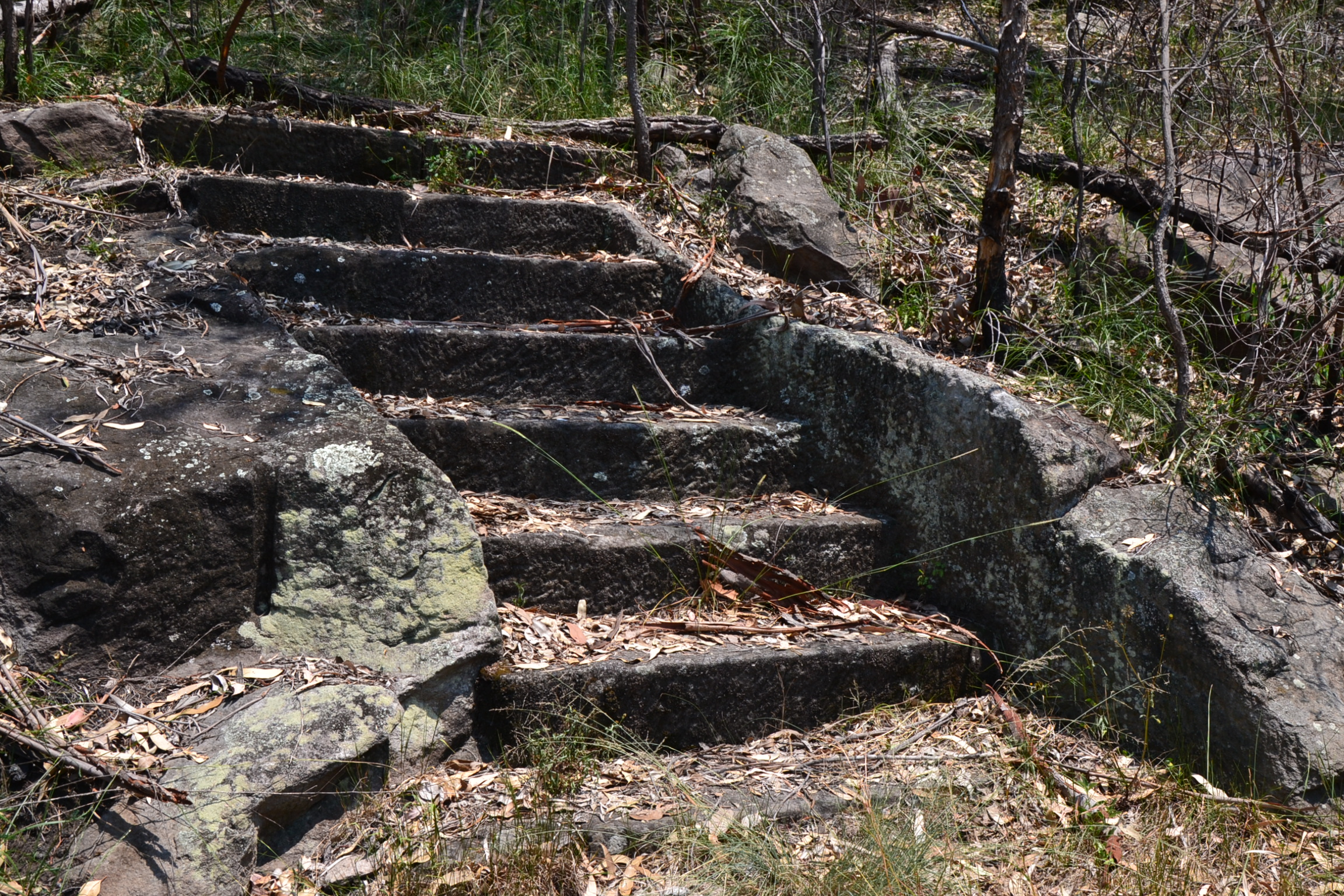

== See also ==
- 1892 Glenbrook Deviation
- 1913 Glenbrook Deviation
- 1892 Glenbrook Tunnel
- 1913 Glenbrook Tunnel
- Lennox Bridge, Glenbrook
- List of tunnels in Australia
- Lithgow Zig Zag

== Coordinates ==
- 33°45′33″S 150°38′24″E – Knapsack Viaduct
- 33°46′01″S 150°38′26″E – Bottom Points
- 33°45′43″S 150°38′21″E – Top Points
- 33°45′40″S 150°38′21″E – Lucasville Platform
- 33°45′57″S 150°38′19″E – Breakfast Point halt
- 33°46′04″S 150°38′06″E – Glenbrook Tunnel east portal
- 33°45′49″S 150°37′47″E – Glenbrook Tunnel west portal
- 33°45′54″S 150°37′23″E – Glenbrook station
