= Glenbrook Deviation (1892) =

Overview
- Status: Closed; superseded by the Glenbrook Deviation (1913)
- Owner: Transport Asset Manager of New South Wales
- Locale: Blue Mountains, New South Wales, Australia
- Termini: Lapstone Bottom Points (east) 33°46′01″S 150°38′26″E; Old Glenbrook station (west) 33°45′54″S 150°37′23″E

Service
- Type: Heavy rail
- System: Main Western line

History
- Opened: December 1892
- Closed: 25 September 1913

Technical
- Track length: approx. 5 miles (8 km)
- Number of tracks: Single (since removed)
- Track gauge: 4 ft 8 1/2 in (1,435 mm) standard gauge

New South Wales Heritage Database (Local Government Register)
- Official name: Former Railway Line and Abandoned Rail Tunnel; Glenbrook Tunnel (Lapstone Hill)
- Type: Local government heritage (built)
- Designated: 27 December 1991
- Reference no.: G018
- Type: Railway line
- Builders: Department of Railways

The Glenbrook deviation was a section of track on the Main Western line from the first Knapsack Viaduct to old Glenbrook station in the Blue Mountains of New South Wales, Australia. The approximately five-mile-long (eight-kilometre) deviation was constructed from 1891 to 1892 and replaced the Lapstone Zig Zag. The deviation was closed in 1913 when it was replaced by the second Glenbrook deviation and the second Glenbrook Tunnel, that continues to carry the Main Western line today.

== History ==
In 1890 it was proposed to bypass the troublesome Lapstone Zig Zag by using a tunnel. This proposal was approved and in March 1891 tenders were called for its construction. The line left Bottom Points and continued into a gully before entering the 2,165-foot-long (660 m) tunnel, on a continuous 1-in-33 gradient. After emerging just below the original alignment, the line curved to the left and ascended slightly before rejoining the original line at Glenbrook. The site of the original Glenbrook Station now lies to the right of the Great Western Highway, near the skate park.

However, the deviation soon proved to be somewhat of a disaster. Even if it did eliminate the Zig Zag which restricted train length, the problem was the design of the tunnel. The first problem was the climb, the tunnel being on a steep, continuous 1-in-33 gradient. The second and main problem was ventilation. The tunnel was single-track, which made the dimensions tight, and towards one end was a curve, which made the ventilation even worse. Passengers found themselves fighting off smoke and fumes from the locomotive. Trains would begin slipping halfway through the tunnel, forcing engine crews to retreat for air. In one incident of 1908, a retreating train met with another down goods train in a collision at the tunnel mouth.

In 1910, work started on a new deviation when the Main Western Line over the Blue Mountains was being duplicated at the time. The second Glenbrook deviation replaced the 1-in-33 deviation with a more gentle 1-in-60 ruling grade across Glenbrook Gorge.

During World War II, the tunnel was used to store bombs and ammunition. After the war however, the tunnel found a useful purpose as a mushroom farm, which continued up until 2016. The upper area has been cleared, though the years of detritus has been left to rot in the tunnel making it unsafe for healthy exploration. The lower area has benefited from the years of mushroom farming by being fed the run-off and is difficult to access.

== See also ==
- Glenbrook Tunnel (1892)
- Glenbrook Tunnel (1913)
- Lapstone Zig Zag
- List of railway tunnels in New South Wales
- List of tunnels in Australia
