= Glenbrook Tunnel =

Glenbrook Tunnel may refer to:

- Glenbrook Tunnel (1892)
- Glenbrook Tunnel (1913)
