= Glenbrook Deviation (1913) =

Overview
- Owner: Transport Asset Holding Entity
- Locale: Blue Mountains, New South Wales, Australia
- Termini: Emu Plains station (east) 33°44′44″S 150°40′19″E; Blaxland station (west) 33°44′37″S 150°36′35″E

Service
- Type: Heavy rail; Commuter rail
- System: Main Western line

History
- Opened: 11 April 1913

Technical
- Track length: approx. 7 miles (11 km)
- Number of tracks: Double
- Track gauge: 4 ft 8 1/2 in (1,435 mm) standard gauge

New South Wales Heritage Database (Local Government Register)
- Official name: Glenbrook Railway Deviation
- Type: Local government heritage (built)
- Designated: 27 December 1991
- Reference no.: s.170
- Type: Railway line
- Category: Other - Transport - Rail
- Builders: Department of Railways

The Glenbrook deviation is a section of track on the Main Western line from Emu Plains to Blaxland stations in the Blue Mountains of New South Wales, Australia. The approximately 11 kilometres (6.8 mi) double-track deviation was constructed from 1911 to 1913 and replaced the single-track first Glenbrook deviation and the first Glenbrook Tunnel.

== History ==
In 1890 it was proposed to bypass the troublesome Lapstone Zig Zag by using a tunnel. This proposal was approved and in March 1891 tenders were called for its construction. The line left Bottom Points and continued into a gully before entering the 2,165-foot-long (660 m) tunnel, on a continuous 1-in-33 gradient. After emerging just below the original alignment, the line curved to the left and ascended slightly before rejoining the original line at Glenbrook. The site of the original Glenbrook Station now lies to the right of the Great Western Highway, near the skate park.

However, the deviation soon proved to be somewhat of a disaster. Even if it did eliminate the Zig Zag which restricted train length, the problem was the design of the tunnel. The first problem was the climb, the tunnel being on a steep, continuous 1-in-33 gradient. The second and main problem was ventilation. The tunnel was single-track, which made the dimensions tight, and towards one end was a curve, which made the ventilation even worse. Passengers found themselves fighting off smoke and fumes from the locomotive. Trains would begin slipping halfway through the tunnel, forcing engine crews to retreat for air. In one incident of 1908, a retreating train met with another down goods train in a collision at the tunnel mouth.

In 1910, work started on a new deviation when the Main Western Line over the Blue Mountains was being duplicated at the time. The second Glenbrook deviation replaced the 1-in-33 deviation with a more gentle 1-in-60 ruling grade across Glenbrook Gorge. This deviation remains in current use.

== See also ==
- Glenbrook Deviation (1892)
- Glenbrook Tunnel (1892)
- Glenbrook Tunnel (1913)
- Lapstone Zig Zag
- List of railway tunnels in New South Wales
- List of tunnels in Australia
