= Knapsack Viaduct =

- Coordinates: 33°45′31″S 150°38′25″E
- Carries: Pedestrians only
- Crosses: Knapsack Gully
- Locale: Glenbrook, Blue Mountains, New South Wales, Australia

Characteristics
- Design: Arch viaduct
- Material: Hawkesbury sandstone
- Total length: 118 metres (388 ft)
- Height: 37 metres (120 ft)
- Longest span: 5 of 17 metres (55 ft)
- No. of spans: 7

History
- Engineering design by: John Whitton
- Constructed by: W. Watkins
- Construction start: 1863
- Construction end: 1865
- Opened: 1867

New South Wales Heritage Database (Local Government Register)
- Official name: Knapsack Viaduct, Lapstone; RTA Bridge No. 967
- Type: State heritage (built)
- Designated: 2 April 1999
- Reference no.: s.170
- Type: Road Bridge
- Category: Transport – Land
- Builder: William Watkins

Location
- Interactive map of Knapsack Viaduct

The Knapsack Viaduct is a sandstone arch viaduct, designed by John Whitton and built by William Watkins. Its purpose was to carry the Main Western railway line across Knapsack Gully. It formed part of the Lapstone Zig Zag, which climbed the eastern escarpment from Emu Plains to today's Glenbrook. Whitton also designed the Victoria Bridge across the Nepean River at Penrith.

== History ==
Construction of the Knapsack Gully Viaduct started in March 1863 by contractor W. Watkins, who also completed the stone piers of the Victoria Bridge at Penrith. Work was completed in 1867, with the bridge being constructed from local sandstone quarried in the neighbourhood around Lapstone and carried a single rail line.

The viaduct fell into disuse in 1913 after the completion of the Second Glenbrook Deviation. In 1926, after a decade of disuse, the Knapsack Viaduct was taken over by the Main Roads Board. The board sought to improve the route of the Great Western Highway between Emu Plains and Blaxland, that at the time zig zagged up Mitchell's Pass which replaced Old Bathurst Road in 1832. The viaduct's carriageway was widened to allow for two car lanes, by trimming back the inside face of the stone parapets. The new road was opened by Governor Sir Dudley de Chair on 23 October 1926. The viaduct was again widened in 1939, with the construction of a reinforced concrete cantilevered deck, because of increased traffic use.

The final deviation of the Great Western Highway, with the opening of the M4 Western Motorway in 1993, ended traffic flow across the Knapsack Viaduct. In 1995 the Viaduct was reopened to the public as part of the historic Lapstone Zig Zag walk.
