= Lucasville railway station =

Former railway station in New South Wales, Australia

Lucasville
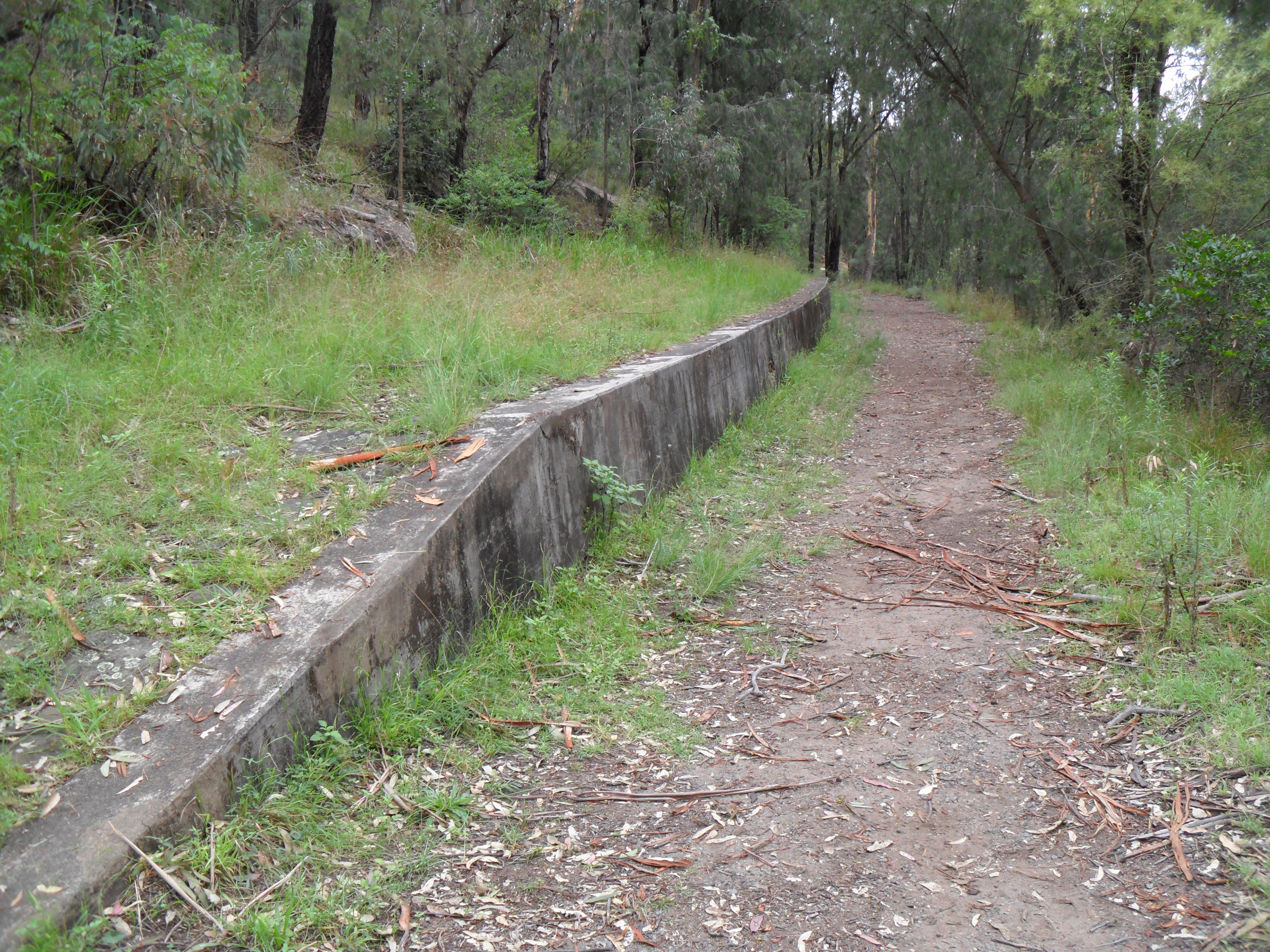
- The remains of the platform

General information
- Location: Glenbrook, New South Wales; Australia
- Coordinates: 33°45′42″S 150°38′20″E
- Operator: New South Wales Government Railways
- Lines: Lapstone Zig Zag; Main Western
- Distance: 62.362 km from Central
- Platforms: 1 (1 side)
- Tracks: 1

Construction
- Structure type: Ground

Other information
- Status: Closed

History
- Opened: 15 April 1878
- Closed: 18 December 1892

Services
Preceding station	Former services	Following station
Breakfast Point towards Bourke	Main Western Line (1878–1889)	Emu Plains towards Sydney
Glenbrook towards Bourke	Main Western Line (1889–1892)	Emu Plains towards Sydney
Location

Lucasville railway station was a railway station on the Lapstone Zig Zag, part of the Main Western line in New South Wales. The station was open between 1878 and 1892.

John Lucas purchased land for a country retreat adjacent to the top road of the Lapstone ZigZag. He built his house called Lucasville. The house has disappeared but traces of its gardens and access paths are still visible immediately to the west of the ZigZag walking track.

For the convenience of himself, his family, and his guests, Lucas used his political clout to have a railway station built on the Top Road of the ZigZag. Lucasville Station opened in 1878 and the substantial concrete platform, with rock-cut steps leading west into Lucasville grounds.

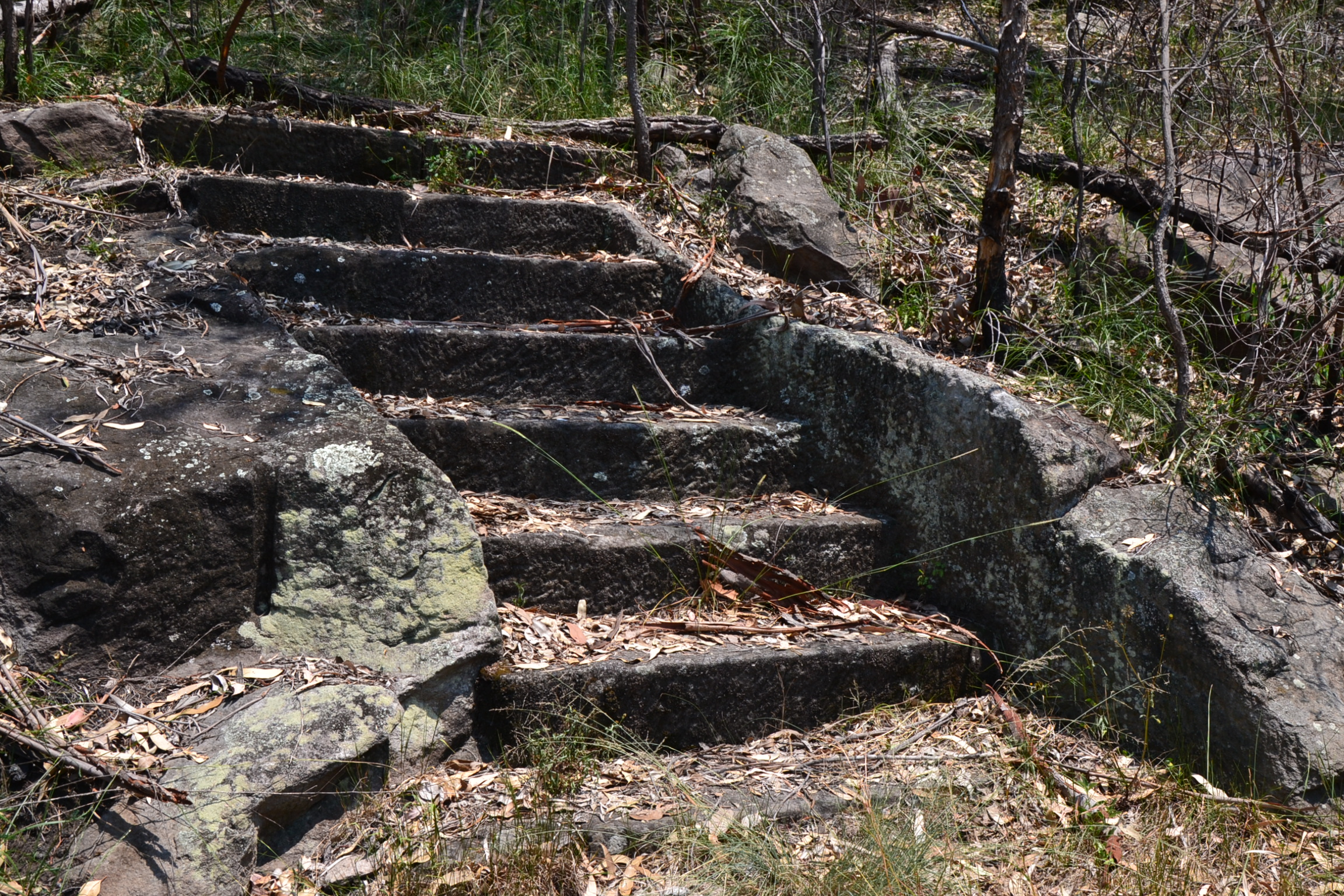

Today the station is part of the Historic Lapstone Zig Zag walking track.
