= Glenbrook Tunnel (1913) =

- Interactive map of Glenbrook Tunnel (1913)

Overview
- Line: Main Western Line
- Location: Glenbrook, Blue Mountains, New South Wales, Australia
- Coordinates: 33°46′51″S 150°37′40″E
- System: NSW TrainLink

Operation
- Work began: March 1911
- Opened: 11 May 1913
- Owner: Transport Asset Manager of New South Wales
- Traffic: Train
- Character: Passenger; freight

Technical
- Length: 283 metres (928 ft)
- No. of tracks: Double
- Track gauge: 4 ft 8 1/2 in (1,435 mm) standard gauge
- Grade: 1:60

The Glenbrook Tunnel is a double-track railway tunnel located on the Main Western Line, near Glenbrook, in the City of Blue Mountains local government area of New South Wales, Australia. The property is owned by the Transport Asset Manager of New South Wales. The railway tunnel is part of the Glenbrook 1913 double-track deviation, which replaced the Glenbrook 1892 single-track deviation across the Blue Mountains. The tunnel is 283 metres (928 ft) long and was officially opened on 11 May 1913.

== Description ==
At 283 metres (928 ft), the 1913 tunnel was shorter than the 634-metre-long (2,080 ft) 1892 Glenbrook Tunnel. However, the 1913 deviation was approximately three kilometres (two miles) longer than the 1892 deviation. The 1913 deviation did not improve the time taken to climb or descend the pass between Emu Plains and Blaxland stations, however a reduction in gradient from 1:30 to 1:60 made the pass more manageable and reduced challenges with steam locomotives in tunnels on significant gradients, including reducing the possibility of suffocation.

Initially, it was planned to continue use of the 1892 tunnel for trains that head east from the Blue Mountains towards Emu Plains station. When the deviation opened in May 1913, the single-track 1892 tunnel, with a gradient of 1:30, was used for east-bound trains and the new 1913 tunnel, with a gradient of 1:60, was used for west-bound trains. After the new line duplication was completed on 25 September 1913, the old (1892) Glenbrook Tunnel was no longer used for trains and the old Glenbrook station was closed.

Steel sleepers were used instead of traditional wooden sleepers. Electricity supplied power to the tunnel for lighting and electric fans used to maintain air quality.

The improvements to the Main Western Line resulted in rapid development of the Blue Mountains area as both a residential and tourism destination.

== Slab track ==
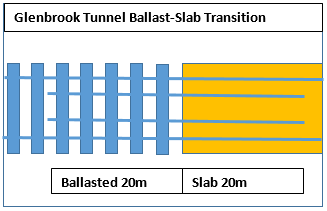
The track through the tunnel is located on a 300m radius curve.

The track through this tunnel was eventually converted to so-called Slab track whereby the ballast was replaced by a concrete slab. This would have improved clearances inside the tunnel. But slab track created a new problems, namely that the slab track was stiffer than the ballasted track that adjoined it, and a transition was needed between the two stiffness levels. The transition was implemented by installing two extra "check rails" extending, say, 20m into the tunnel and 20m along the ballasted track. This created its own problem in that the last 20m of ballasted track was difficult to tamp because of the extra rails.

== See also ==
- Glenbrook Deviation (1892)
- Glenbrook Tunnel (1892)
- Lapstone Zig Zag
- List of railway tunnels in New South Wales
- List of tunnels in Australia
