= List of tunnels in Australia =

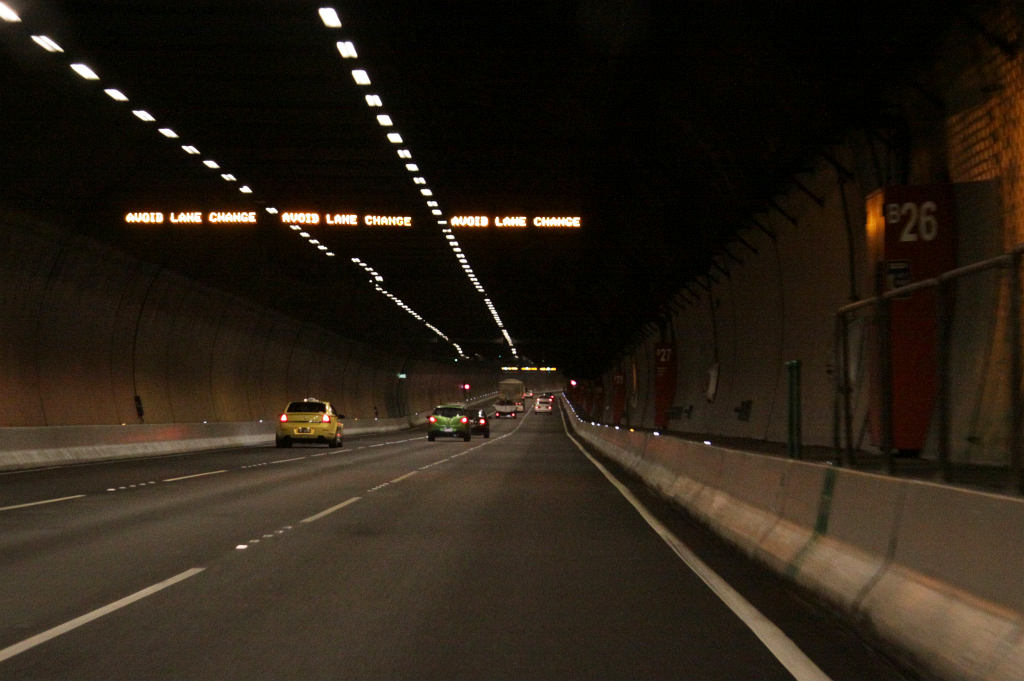
Outbound lanes of CityLink, inside the Burnley Tunnel, Melbourne 2010

This is a list of tunnels in Australia which includes any road, railway, waterway or other form of tunnel, anywhere in the country.

== Australian Capital Territory ==
Name	Image	Locale	Carries	Type	Length		Notes
Name	Image	Locale	Carries	Type	m	ft	Notes
Acton Tunnel		Acton, Australian Capital Territory	Carries Parkes Way under a hill	Road	190	623	Three levels, with the upper two being used for car parking and storage by the Australian National University

== New South Wales ==
Name	Image	Locale	Carries	Type	Length		Notes
Name	Image	Locale	Carries	Type	m	ft	Notes
Airport railway line		Wolli Creek to Central	East Hills railway line	Rail	10,000	33,000	
Bilston Tunnel		Kosciuszko National Park	Skitube	Rail	3,300	10,800	
Blue Cow Tunnel		Kosciuszko National Park	Skitube	Rail	2,600	8,500	
Ardglen Tunnel		Upper Hunter Shire	Main Northern railway line	Rail	488	1,601	
Airport Tunnel		Mascot	General Holmes Drive	Road	550	1,800	Two in-line dual tunnels that carry runways for Sydney Airport
Avon Tunnel		Dombarton to Avon	Maldon - Dombarton railway line	Rail	4,000	13,000	A planned single track tunnel. Only a few metres at each end were evacuated. 150.7372°, −34.4451°
Balmain Colliery		Below Sydney Harbour		Coal mine			
Belmore Tunnel		Blue Mountains	Main Western railway line	Rail			Used by Zig Zag tourist railway on the Lithgow Zig Zag
Bethungra Spiral		Bethungra	Main Southern railway line	Rail	205	673	Two tunnels
Border Tunnel		Richmond Valley	North Coast line	Rail	1,160	3,810	On the border between New South Wales and Queensland
Box Vale tunnel		Mittagong	Box Vale rail line				unlined tunnel through final spur
Bullio Tunnel (Wombeyan Caves Rd Tunnel)		Nattai National Park	Wombeyan Caves Road	Road	22	72	
Busby's Bore		From Centennial Parklands to Hyde Park	Sydney water supply	Water	3,600	11,800	Built from 1827 to 1837 and remains in limited use
Bylong Rail Tunnel		Bylong	Sandy Hollow to Maryvale Line, No 3 of 5	Rail	1,975	6,480	At the time of its construction, it was the longest rail tunnel
Boronia Tunnels		Cowan	Main North line	Rail	1,313	4,308	1–4 in use, 5 deviated; double track; longest tunnel is 602 metres (1,975 ft)
Bungendore – Queanbeyan rail			Bombala line	Rail			Brooks Bank tunnel and two Pine Range tunnels
Carcoar Tunnel		Carcoar	Blayney–Demondrille railway line	Rail	281	922	No longer in use
City Circle		Sydney central business district	Sydney underground railways	Rail	5,000	16,000	Estimate of tunnel length from Central to Circular Quay and return. Two tunnels
Clarence Tunnel		Clarence, Blue Mountains	Main Western line	Rail	493	1,617	Replaced by Ten Tunnels Deviation; used by Zig Zag tourist railway
Colinton rail tunnel		Colinton	Bombala line	Rail	161	528	No longer in use
Cooks River Tunnel		Between Sydney Airport and Tempe	M5 Motorway	Road			Under Cooks River
Cougal Spiral		Richmond Valley	North Coast line	Rail	369	1,211	Two tunnels (See also Border Tunnel)
Cross City Tunnel		Sydney central business district	Cross City Tunnel	Road	2,100	6,900	Two tunnels
Cudgen Road Tunnel		Tweed Valley	Pacific Motorway	Road	134	440	Twin tunnels; opened in 2002
Devonshire Street Tunnel		Sydney central business district	Railway Square to Surry Hills	Pedestrian	300	980	
Dorrigo railway line		Dorrigo	Dorrigo railway line	Rail			Two tunnels of unknown length between Glenreagh and Timber Top
Eastern Distributor Tunnel		Between Woolloomooloo and Surry Hills	Eastern Distributor	Road	1,700	5,600	Completed in 2000; tolled on exit, northbound only; unique 'piggyback' design with three lanes, northbound, stacked on top of three lanes, southbound
Eastern Suburbs railway line		Sydney	Eastern Suburbs railway line	Rail			Erskineville to Bondi Junction
Epping to Chatswood railway line		Sydney	Metro North West & Bankstown Line	Rail	13,000	43,000	
Fernleigh Tunnel		Adamstown Heights and Jewells	Fernleigh Track	Rail trail	181	594	Former railway tunnel on the Belmont railway line, opened in 1891–1892 and now used by pedestrians and cyclists as part of the Fernleigh Track.
Gib tunnel		between Mittagong & Bowral	Main South line	Rail	516	1,693	Two tunnels; original single-track line now replaced; and one double-track line adjacent
Glenbrook Tunnel (1892)		Glenbrook	Main Western Line (since deviated)	Heritage	634	2,080	
Glenbrook Tunnel (1913)		Between Lapstone and Glenbrook	Main Western line	Rail	283	928	Double-track line, in use
Glowworm Tunnel Rd Tunnel		Wollemi National Park	Glowworm Tunnel Road	Road	160	520	
Helensburgh Tunnels including the Helensburgh Glow Worm, Lilyvale and Otford tunnels		Illawarra escarpment	Illawarra railway line	Rail	3,257	10,686	Seven disused tunnels; previous use between 1884 and 1920 plus Seven in use dual line tunnels plus one single tunnel
Kings Cross Tunnel		Kings Cross		Road	274	899	
Lane Cove Tunnel		Lane Cove	M2 Motorway	Road	3,600	11,800	
Long Island		Hawkesbury River station	Main North line	Rail	263	863	Two tunnels; one Disused single track tunnel used for storage and a Double track, in use, adjacent
Malaita Point		Katoomba		Rail			through post of a coal mine
Marrangaroo		Lithgow	Main Western line	Rail	974	3,196	Former single-track line; since deviated as double-track line, in use. Only double-track line length shown
Merewether Bluff		Merewether		Rail			Disused, Australia's first two railway tunnels, 1861 & 1862, privately operated
M4 East Tunnel		Between Haberfield and Homebush	M4 Motorway	Road	5,500	18,000	Dual tunnels
M4-M5 Link (WestConnex)		Between Haberfield and St Peters	M4/M5 /	Road	9,200	30,200	Australia's longest road tunnel
M5 East Tunnel		Between Beverly Hills and Arncliffe	M5 Motorway	Road			
M8 Motorway		Between Beverly Hills and St Peters	M8 Motorway	Road	9,000	30,000	
Moore Park Tunnel		Moore Park	CBD and South East Light Rail	Light rail			from Eastern Distributor to Anzac Parade
Mount Alexandra		Mittagong	Fitzroy Iron Works				short tunnel on horse-drawn tramway replacement
Mount Rennie		Katoomba	Narrow Neck	Rail	395	1,296	Disused; previous use shale transport
Mullet Creek Tunnel		North of the Hawkesbury River in Wondabyne, Central Coast	Main North line	Rail	456	1,496	Double track, in use, from the Hawkesbury Bridge Platform and Jct (end Hawkesbury Bridge deviation)
New Main Tunnel		Picton	Main South line	Rail	183	600	Double track, in use, between Picton station and Redback tunnel
Newnes Glowworm Tunnel		Between Newnes and Lithgow	Newnes railway line	Rail	1,320	4,330	Rail use between 1907 and 1932; converted to pedestrian and tourism use
NorthConnex		Between Pennant Hills and Wahroonga	Pacific Motorway /Hills Motorway	Road	9,000	30,000	Opened 31 October 2020
Old Main Tunnel		Picton	Main South line	Rail	181	594	Disused; previous use between 1867 and 1919
Pyrmont and Glebe Railway Tunnels		Between Pyrmont and Glebe	Inner West Light Rail	Light rail	1,500	4,900	Two double-track tunnels; completed in 1922; estimated length
Redbank Tunnel		Tahmoor	Main South line	Rail	181	594	Double-track, in use; deviated, filled in
Red Hill Tunnels		Coffs Harbour	North Coast line	Rail	955	3,133	Five tunnels, opened in 1922
St Helena Tunnel		Ewingsdale, near Byron Bay, Tweed Valley	Pacific Highway	Road	434	1,424	Opened 18 December 2015
Stockrington		Maitland	Richmond Vale railway line				3 tunnels
Sydney Harbour Tunnel		Between Woolloomooloo and North Sydney under Sydney Harbour	Sydney Harbour Tunnel	Road	2,800	9,200	
Sydney Harbour railway electricity tunnel		Between Birchgrove and Greenwich	Below Sydney Harbour	Power supply	540	1,760	Approximate distance
Sydney Metro Northwest		Between Bella Vista and Epping stations	Metro North West & Bankstown Line	Rail	15,500	50,900	Opened May 2019
Sydney Metro City & Southwest		Between Chatswood and Sydenham stations in Sydney		Rail	15,500	50,900	Opened in August 2024 becoming Australia's longest tunnel.
Tank Stream tunnel		Between Hyde Park and Circular Quay; Sydney central business district	Tank Stream	Storm water	700	2,300	Estimate of remnants of 1860s tunnel
Ten Tunnels Deviation		Blue Mountains	Main Western line	Rail	2,822	9,259	Replaced the Lithgow Zig Zag; ten tunnels of ranging in length from 70 to 825 metres (230 to 2,707 ft)
Tickhole Tunnel		Between Cardiff and Kotara stations; Newcastle	Main North line	Rail	370	1,210	Dual tunnels ranging in length from 165 to 205 metres (541 to 673 ft)
Tugun Bypass Tunnel		Tweed Heads	Gold Coast Airport	Road	334	1,096	
Upper Nepean Scheme		Campbelltown		Water			Two tunnels
Woy Woy Tunnel		Between Wondabyne and Woy Woy stations, Central Coast	Main North line	Rail	1,690	5,544	Opened 15 August 1887; double track
Wynyard Walk		Sydney central business district	Wynyard	Pedestrian	180	590	

== Queensland ==
Name	Image	Locale	Carries	Type	Length		Notes
Name	Image	Locale	Carries	Type	m	ft	Notes
Airport Link		Between Bowen Hills and Toombul; Brisbane	Airport Link	Road	6,700	22,000	Australia's longest road tunnel (at the time)
Boolboonda Tunnel		Mount Perry; Boolboonda, Bundaberg Region	Bundaberg to Mount Perry railway line	Rail heritage	192	630	
Border Tunnel		Richmond Gap, connecting New South Wales and Queensland	NSW North Coast line	Rail	1,600	5,200	On the border between New South Wales and Queensland (see New South Wales section above)
Cherry Gully Tunnel		Southern Downs Region	Warwick – Stanthorpe Line	Rail	272	892	Comprises two single-track tunnels
Clem Jones Tunnel		Between Woolloongabba and Bowen Hills, Brisbane	Clem Jones Tunnel	Road	4,800	15,700	Two parallel tubes under the Brisbane River
Cross River Rail		From Dutton Park rail to Boggo Road busway stations in Brisbane		Rail	5,900	19,400	Two bored tunnels under construction with one complete in 2021 but not operational
Dalveen Tunnel		Dalveen, Southern Downs Region	Warwick to Wallangarra railway line	Rail	140	460	single line rail tunnel
Dularcha Railway Tunnel		Mooloolah, Sunshine Coast Region	North Coast line	Rail	100	330	Disused line
Eastern Busway		Dutton Park, Brisbane	Annerley Road	Road, busway	640	2,100	Built under Boggo Road Gaol
George Bridges Tunnel		Nundah, Brisbane	Sandgate Road	Road	285	935	
Inner City Bypass tunnel		Breakfast Creek, Brisbane	Inner City Bypass	Road	350	1,150	
Lahey's Canungra Tramway Tunnel		Canungra, Gold Coast	Pedestrians only	Rail heritage	91	299	c. 1900
Legacy Way		Toowong and Kelvin Grove, Brisbane	Linking the Western Freeway with the Inner City Bypass	Road	4,600	15,100	Two bored tunnels carrying two motorway grade lanes of traffic in each direction
Leopard Street Tunnel		Brisbane		Stormwater			c. 1890
Main Range tunnels		Main Range	Main Line	Rail	886	2,907	A series of nine single-track or double-track tunnels that date from c. 1866
Many Peaks – Monto loop line		Boyne Valley	Gladstone to Monto railway line	Rail heritage	730	2,400	Six tunnels on a disused railway line
Muntapa rail tunnel		Cooyar, Toowoomba Region	Cooyar railway line	Rail heritage	280	920	
Victoria Tunnel		Grandchester	Main Line	Rail	537	1,762	
Yimbun Railway Tunnel		Harlin, Somerset Region	Brisbane Valley railway line	Rail	100	330	Completed in 1910; line closed in 1993

== South Australia ==
Name	Image	Locale	Carries	Type	Length		Notes
Name	Image	Locale	Carries	Type	m	ft	Notes
Ambleside Tunnel		Verdun	Main South Line	Rail	172	564	Tunnel 9
Barossa Reservoir supply tunnel		Williamstown	Between South Para River and South Para Reservoir	Water	2,000	6,600	
Clarendon Weir to Happy Valley Reservoir Tunnel		south of Adelaide city centre		Water	5,000	16,000	
Dowds Hill Tunnel		East of Peterborough	Crystal Brook-Broken Hill railway line under Wilmington–Ucolta Road	Rail	95	312	
Echo Tunnel		Belair National Park, Belair	Footpath and creek under Main South Line	Pedestrian			
Eden Hills Tunnels		Eden Hills	Belair railway line	Rail	156	512	Tunnel 3 constructed 1880s
Eden Hills Tunnels		Eden Hills	Main South Line	Rail	156	512	1920
Former Coromandel Tunnel		Blackwood	Main South Line	Rail			Tunnel 4, converted to a cutting and bridge when track duplicated 1920
Former Pinera Tunnel		Belair	Main South Line	Rail			Tunnel 5, converted to a cutting and bridge when track duplicated 1920
Former Sleeps Hill Tunnels		Panorama	Previous alignment of Main South Line	Rail	170	560	Tunnels 1 and 2, 1880s–1920
Former Sleeps Hill Tunnels		Panorama	Previous alignment of Main South Line	Rail	360	1,180	Tunnels 1 and 2, 1880s–1920
Heysen Tunnels		Mount Lofty Ranges	South Eastern Freeway	Road	500	1,600	
Long Gully Tunnel		Belair	Main South Line	Rail	304	997	Tunnel 7
Murray Bridge Tunnel		Murray Bridge	Main South Line	Rail	80	260	
National Park Tunnel		Belair	Main South Line	Rail	193	633	Tunnel 6
O-Bahn Busway City access tunnel		Adelaide Park Lands			670	2,200	Opened 2017
Sleeps Hill Tunnel		Panorama	Main South Line	Rail	738	2,421	Replaced Tunnels 1 and 2 in 1920
Tod River Reservoir works				Water			
Torrens Gorge Tunnel				Water			
Upper Sturt Tunnel		Upper Sturt	Main South Line	Rail	199	653	Tunnel 8

== Tasmania ==
Name	Image	Locale	Carries	Type	Length		Notes
Name	Image	Locale	Carries	Type	m	ft	Notes
Argent Tunnel		Near Melba Flats / Zeehan, West Coast	Emu Bay Railway (Melba line)	Rail	508	1,666	Documented on the Emu Bay Railway by 1900; historic photo shows the north portal and self-acting tramway. Coordinates recorded in Australian place-name data.
Bellerive–Sorell railway tunnel (Tunnel Hill)		Meehan Range (Mount Rumney / Cambridge), Clarence	Former Bellerive–Sorell railway	Rail (disused)	165	541	Built 1891; heritage-listed; part used for mushroom cultivation and tours (Tunnel Hill Mushrooms). No general public access through-route.
Derby Tunnel		Derby	Mining tailings / water diversion works	Mining (disused; now walk/ride-through)			19th-century tunnel associated with tin-mining works on the Cascade River; incorporated into local trails and interpreted at the Schoolhouse Museum.
Duck Reach Supply Tunnel		Launceston	Deadmans Hollow → Duck Reach PS (historic)	Water	850	2,790	1895 tunnel through dolerite for Australia's first commercial hydro scheme (closed 1955).
Gordon Tailrace Tunnel		Southwest	Gordon PS (underground) → Gordon River	Water	1,600	5,200	Fed from Lake Gordon via ~137 metres (449 ft) vertical shaft.
John Butters Headrace Tunnel		West Coast Range (King–Yolande scheme)	Crotty Dam (Lake Burbury) → John Butters PS (underground)	Water	6,500	21,300	Plus 500 metres (1,600 ft) steel-lined power tunnel (≈7 kilometres (4.3 mi) total through West Coast Range).
Lemonthyme Headrace Tunnel		Mersey–Forth	Lake Parangana → Lemonthyme PS	Water	6,500	21,300	Followed by 1.6 kilometres (0.99 mi) surface penstock to station.
Liapootah Headrace Tunnel		Lower Derwent	Derwent R. (below Tarraleah/Tungatinah) → Liapootah PS	Water	6,600	21,700	Concrete-lined tunnel feeding three penstocks.
North-Eastern Line tunnel		Tunnel (between Launceston and Scottsdale)	Former North-Eastern railway line	Rail (disused)	704	2,310	Late-1880s brick tunnel that gave the locality its name; now a popular short walk.
Poatina Headrace Tunnel		Central Highlands	Great Lake → Poatina PS	Water	5,600	18,400	Headrace to hilltop valve; then 105 m steel-lined pressure tunnel, 1.8 km surface penstock, 150 m shaft to underground station.
Poatina Tailrace Tunnel		Central Highlands	Poatina PS → Macquarie River	Water	4,000 m	10,000 ft	Approx. length reported in public sources.
Reece Intake Tunnels (×2)		Lower Pieman	Lake Pieman → Reece PS	Water	250	820	One tunnel per turbine unit.
Rhyndaston Tunnel		South of Oatlands; Southern Tasmania	Tasmanian Main Line (Hobart to Western Junction)	Rail	955	3,133	Completed in 1876; later enlarged in the 1960s to a "keyhole" profile to improve clearances.
Spray Tunnel (Silver Spray)		Near Zeehan, West Coast	Former mining tramway / access	Rail/mining (disused)	100	330	Keyhole-shaped tunnel to the former Spray silver mine; signed loop walk with glow-worms; not suitable for caravans on access road.
Trevallyn Conveyance Tunnel		Launceston	South Esk R. → Trevallyn PS	Water	3,200	10,500	Run-of-river link from Trevallyn Dam to station.
Tribute Headrace Tunnel		Anthony/Pieman	Lake Plimsoll → Tribute PS (underground)	Water	7,000	23,000	Plus ~800 metres (2,600 ft) tailrace; >1 kilometre (0.62 mi) access tunnel.
Wayatinah Diversion Tunnel		Lower Derwent	Wayatinah Lagoon → woodstave mains → Wayatinah PS	Water	2,000	6,600	Plus two 1.3 kilometres (0.81 mi) low-pressure woodstave pipelines and penstocks.
Wilmot Conveyance Tunnel		Mersey–Forth	Lake Gairdner → Wilmot PS	Water			Combined tunnel + penstock route ~4.5 kilometres (2.8 mi) (tunnel-only length not published).

== Victoria ==
Name	Image	Locale	Carries	Type	Length		Notes
Name	Image	Locale	Carries	Type	m	ft	Notes
Big Hill Tunnel		Bendigo	Deniliquin railway line	Rail	390	1,280	
Bunbury Street Tunnel		Footscray, Melbourne		Rail	420	1,380	Both Broad Gauge and Standard Gauge entering and leaving Melbourne
Burnley Tunnel		Richmond, Melbourne	CityLink / Monash Freeway	Road	3,400	11,200	
City Loop Tunnels		La Trobe and Spring Streets, Melbourne	Melbourne Underground Rail Loop	Rail	12,000	39,000	Comprises: Two single bi-directional tunnels Flinders Street–Parliament; Four single bi-directional tunnels Parliament–Flagstaff; Three single bi-directional tunnels Flagstaff–Southern Cross
Domain Tunnel		Richmond, Melbourne	CityLink / Monash Freeway	Road	1,600	5,200	
Elphinstone Tunnel			Deniliquin railway line	Rail	385	1,263	Built double track, singled later
Geelong Tunnel		Geelong	Port Fairy railway line	Rail	422	1,385	Exit from Geelong to West coast railway line
Melba Tunnel		Mitcham, Melbourne	Eastern Freeway to EastLink Ringwood	Road	1,600	5,200	
Metro Tunnel		South Yarra to Kensington via Melbourne CBD	Cranbourne line Pakenham line Sunbury line	Rail	9,000	29,500	Once opened in 2025 the tunnel will cary the Pakenham, Cranbourne and Sunbury lines.
Mullum Mullum Tunnel		Mitcham, Melbourne	Eastern Freeway to EastLink Ringwood	Road	1,600	5,200	
Rosanna Tunnel		Rosanna, Melbourne	Hurstbridge railway line	Rail	65	213	
West Richmond Tunnel		Richmond, Melbourne	Hurstbridge railway line	Rail	115	377	
Jolimont Tunnel		East Melbourne, Melbourne	Hurstbridge railway line	Rail	149	489	
Spotswood sewer tunnel		Fishermans Bend and Spotswood; Melbourne	Under Yarra River connecting Hobsons Bay Main with former Spotswood Sewerage Pumping Station	Sewer	200	660	Continues in use as part of Melbourne's Sewerage system
West Gate Tunnel		Spotswood and Fishermans Bend; Melbourne	West Gate Bridge	Road	3,000	9,800	Proposed as part of the Western Distributor, construction commenced in 2018

== Western Australia ==
Name	Image	Locale	Address/Facility	Type	Length		Notes
Name	Image	Locale	Address/Facility	Type	m	ft	Notes
Airport line tunnel		Bayswater, Redcliffe, Perth Airport, High Wycombe	Perth	Rail	8,000	26,000	Twin bored tunnels, part of the Airport line
Canning Tunnel		Canning Dam to Perth	Darling Scarp	Water supply	5,600	18,400	
Northbridge Tunnel		Northbridge	Perth	Road	1,600	5,200	
Port Hedland Harbour Tunnel		Nelson Point to Finucane Island	Port Hedland	Conveyor belt for iron ore fines	1,030	3,380	Passes under Port Hedland harbour
Swan View Tunnel		Swan View	Perth; John Forrest National Park	Rail	262	860	Closed and now converted to a rail trail
William Street tunnel		Perth Underground railway station to Elizabeth Quay railway station	Perth	Rail	700	2,300	Twin bored tunnels that were built as part of the New MetroRail City Project, used by Yanchep and Mandurah line services
Wungong Tunnel		Wungong Dam to Perth	Darling Scarp	Water supply	3,700	12,100	

== See also ==
- List of tunnels by location
