= Murray Bridge Tunnel =

- Interactive map of Murray Bridge Tunnel

Overview
- Line: Adelaide-Wolseley railway line
- Location: Murray Bridge, South Australia
- Coordinates: 35°07′03″S 139°16′39″E
- Status: Operational

Operation
- Opened: 13 November 1925
- Operator: Australian Rail Track Corporation

Technical
- Length: 80 metres (260 ft)
- No. of tracks: Single
- Track gauge: 5 ft 3 in (1,600 mm) (1925–1995); 4 ft 8 1/2 in (1,435 mm) (1995–present)

The Murray Bridge tunnel is a heritage-listed railway tunnel located in Murray Bridge, South Australia. The 80-metre-long (260 ft) tunnel houses a single train line as it runs under Bridge Street in Murray Bridge and links the Murray Bridge railway station with the Murray Bridge Railway Bridge over the River Murray.

The tunnel was constructed by the cut and cover method when the railway line was diverted from the original mixed road and rail bridge to a new rail-only bridge over the Murray River. The tunnel carries the railway under the main road to the bridge.

== See also ==
- List of tunnels in Australia
