= Devonshire Street Tunnel =

Pedestrian tunnel in Sydney, Australia

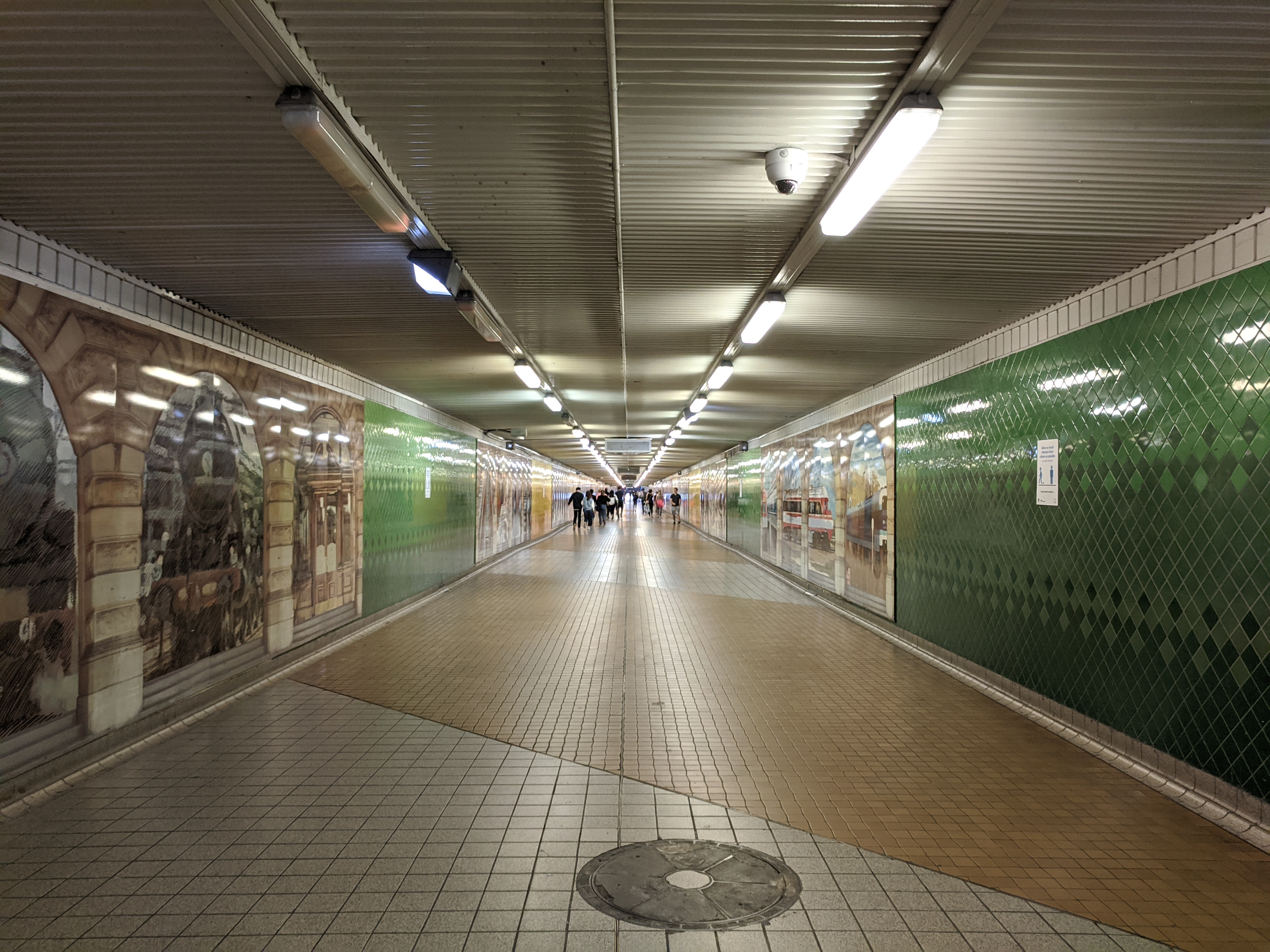
- The Devonshire Street Tunnel in 2020
- Interactive map of Devonshire Street Tunnel

Overview
- Location: Sydney central business district, New South Wales, Australia (Map)
- Coordinates: 33°53′7″S 151°12′24″E
- Start: Surry Hills (east)
- End: Railway Square (west)

Operation
- Opened: 1906
- Owner: Transport Asset Holding Entity
- Traffic: Pedestrians

Technical
- Length: 300 metres (980 ft)

The Devonshire Street Tunnel is a 300-metre-long (980 ft) pedestrian tunnel located beneath the southern end of Central station connecting the suburb of Surry Hills with Railway Square in the Sydney central business district.

== History ==
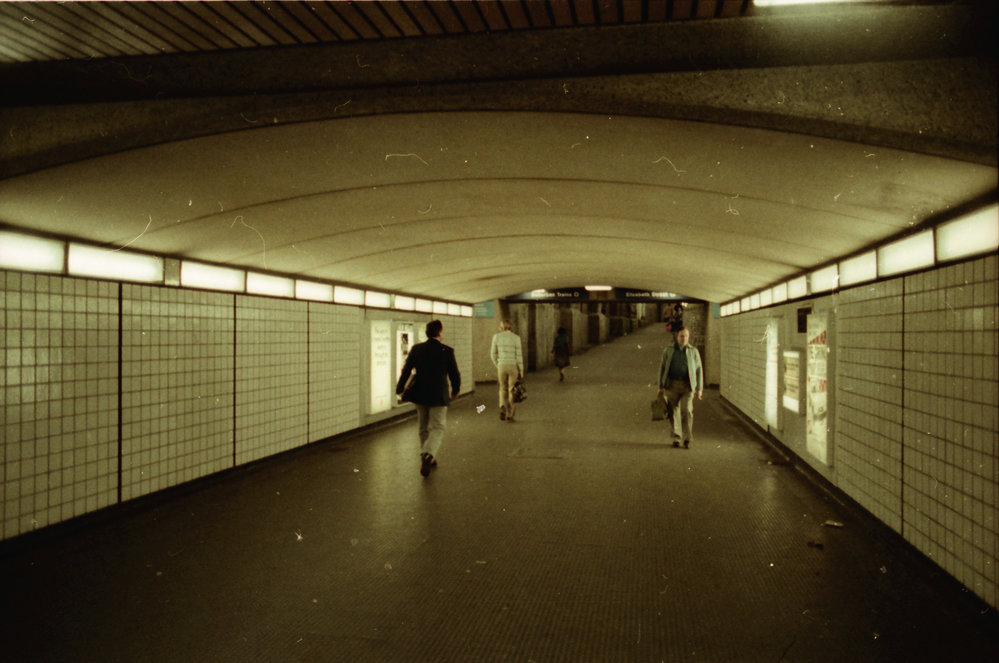
Devonshire Street Tunnel in the 1970s prior to redevelopment.

Opened in 1906 joining as a pedestrian continuation of Devonshire Street in the east to Lee Street in the west, it cut through what was the Devonshire Street Cemetery. In the early 1970s, the tunnel was refurbished with terrazzo panels and fluorescent lights and extended 80 metres (260 ft) to the west under Railway Square. In 1985 murals of trains and railway infrastructure were painted on the walls of the tunnel.

== Route ==
At its eastern end, the tunnel begins at a head house descending from Chalmers Street to a vestibule from which both Central station and the tunnel can be accessed. The tunnel continues west from the vestibule under the tracks and platforms of the station, and opens onto Henry Deane Plaza, a depressed urban square opposite Railway Square filled with shops and restaurants.

The tunnel extension begins at a portal at the opposite end of Henry Deane Plaza, continuing under Lee Street, Railway Square, and George Street, each of these points at which it can be accessed by stairs and escalators. The tunnel extension then continues under the TAFE Marcus Clark Building. The Marcus Clark Building was formerly owned by Marcus Clark & Co., a nine-storey department store was constructed in 1913 at 827–837 George Street, Railway Square. Marcus Clark & Co. originally served as a furniture showroom and an extension of the flagship store located at the corner of Pitt and George Streets. This building was remodelled in 1928 to become the company's main store. The store ceased operations in 1965, and the building was acquired by the Sydney Institute of Technology the following year, in 1966.

The tunnel extension finally opens up at a portal behind the International Institute of Business and Information Technology at 841 George Street, connecting it to The Goods Line, providing an off-street connection between Central station and Darling Harbour.
