= Ewingsdale, New South Wales =

Ewingsdale New South Wales
- Coordinates: 28°38′11″S 153°33′16″E
- Population: 825 (2016 census)
- Postcode(s): 2479
- LGA(s): Byron Shire
- State electorate(s): Ballina
- Federal division(s): Richmond

Ewingsdale is a small town located in the Northern Rivers Region of New South Wales. It is located in the Byron Shire local government area and is approximately 5 kilometres (3.1 mi) from the regional centre of Byron Bay.

It is where the road to Byron Bay branches off the Pacific Highway. To the south lies the St Helena Tunnel that opened in December 2015.

The traditional owners of this place are the Bundjalung (Arakwal) people.

== Origin of place name ==
Until 1904 Ewingsdale was considered as a part of Tyagarah and, when it separated, it was named for a former landowner there, Thomas Ewing, who once also worked as a surveyor in the area.
