= St Helena Tunnel =

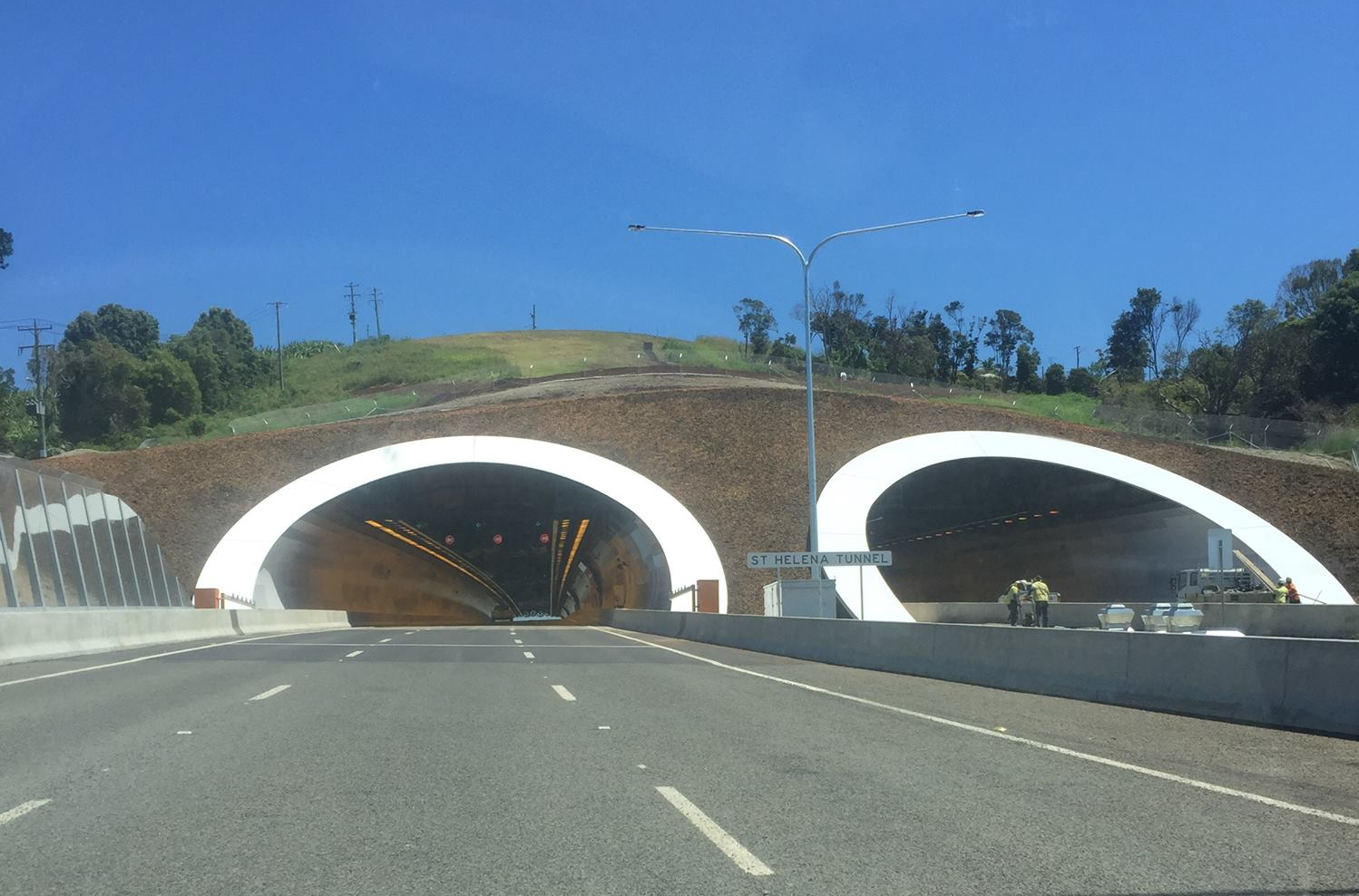
- St Helena Tunnel in December 2015
- Interactive map of St Helena Tunnel

Overview
- Location: Ewingsdale, New South Wales, Australia
- Coordinates: 28°39′10″S 153°32′54″E
- Status: Open
- Route: Pacific Highway

Operation
- Work began: 27 September 2012
- Constructed: Lendlease
- Opened: 18 December 2015
- Owner: Transport for NSW
- Traffic: Automotive (Cyclists and Pedestrians in side lane)
- Character: Dual carriageway grade-separated national highway

Technical
- Length: 434 metres (1,424 ft)
- No. of lanes: Built for 3 lanes each direction, opened as 2 northbound & 3 southbound
- Operating speed: 110 kilometres per hour (68 mph)
- Tunnel clearance: 5.3 metres (17 ft)
- Width: 13.3 metres (44 ft)
- Grade: 2.2%

The St Helena Tunnel is a twin-tube road tunnel that forms part of the Pacific Highway near Byron Bay, New South Wales, Australia. The 434-metre-long (1,424 ft) tunnel under St Helena Hill in the locality of Ewingsdale was built as part of the 17-kilometre (11 mi) Tintenbar to Ewingsdale upgrade, which involved a new alignment of the highway.

== Features ==
The tunnel was built to avoid the steep grades of St Helena Hill on the previous alignment of the highway, and the associated heavy truck noise and pollution. At its deepest point the tunnel is 45 metres (148 ft) below the 131-metre-high (430 ft) ridge line. There are two tunnels, with the northbound tunnel accommodating two traffic lanes and the southbound three traffic lanes, due to the gradient of the highway at this point. There is also a bicycle/pedestrian lane in each tunnel.

The cost of the Tintenbar–Ewingsdale upgrade project was $862 million, jointly funded by the New South Wales and Federal governments. It opened on 18 December 2015. The remaining tie-in work at each end was completed in March 2016.

The St Helena Road passes over the top of the tunnel and provides local access to the Bangalow Road (B62) that is a link between Bangalow and Byron Bay.

== Milestones ==
- January 2010 – Planning approval and construction funding for the Tintenbar to Ewingsdale project including the St Helena Tunnel
- May 2010 – Roads & Maritime Services called for expressions of interest for the construction of the upgrade
- December 2010 – three companies were invited to submit detailed tenders
- August 2011 – the contract was awarded to Baulderstone
- 27 September 2012 – the shovel ceremony was held to commemorate the start of construction
- 28 May 2013 – Blasting began on the twin tunnels
- 24 January 2014 – Excavator broke through on the northbound tunnel
- 26 February 2014 – Excavator broke through on the southbound tunnel
- December 2015 – Commissioning of tunnels began
- 18 December 2015 – The highway upgrade, including the twin tunnels, opened to traffic
