= Rhyndaston Tunnel =

Coordinates: 42°28′00″S 147°23′00″E

The Rhyndaston Tunnel is a 955-metre-long (3,133 ft), 1-in-40-grade (2.5%) railway tunnel in southern Tasmania. The northern end of the tunnel is 72.5 kilometres (45.0 mi) from the Hobart railway yards. It was built as part of the Tasmanian Main Line Company's track from Hobart to Western Junction which was completed in 1876.

== International containers ==
The original tunnel was too small to take the original 2.4-by-2.4-metre (8 by 8 ft) international containers. The tunnel was widened between 1964 and 1965 using a tunnel boring machine mounted on railway wheels, nicknamed 'The Mole' and which was maneuvered into place between trains to excavate a few metres at a time. Enlarging the tunnel had the effect of creating a 'keyhole' shape, and also destroyed the original northern portal, consequently truncating its overall length by several metres.

The later and larger containers may again be too big.

Due to poor ventilation, diesel trains occasionally lose oxygen and fail to make it up the tunnel. In the 1920s M Class Garratt steam locomotives were banned from running north through the tunnel smoke box first, to prevent exhaust accumulating in the crew cab.

The tunnel is located 422 metres (1,385 ft) AHD.

== See also ==
- Rail transport in Tasmania
