= Glenbrook railway station, New South Wales =

Railway station in New South Wales, Australia

Glenbrook
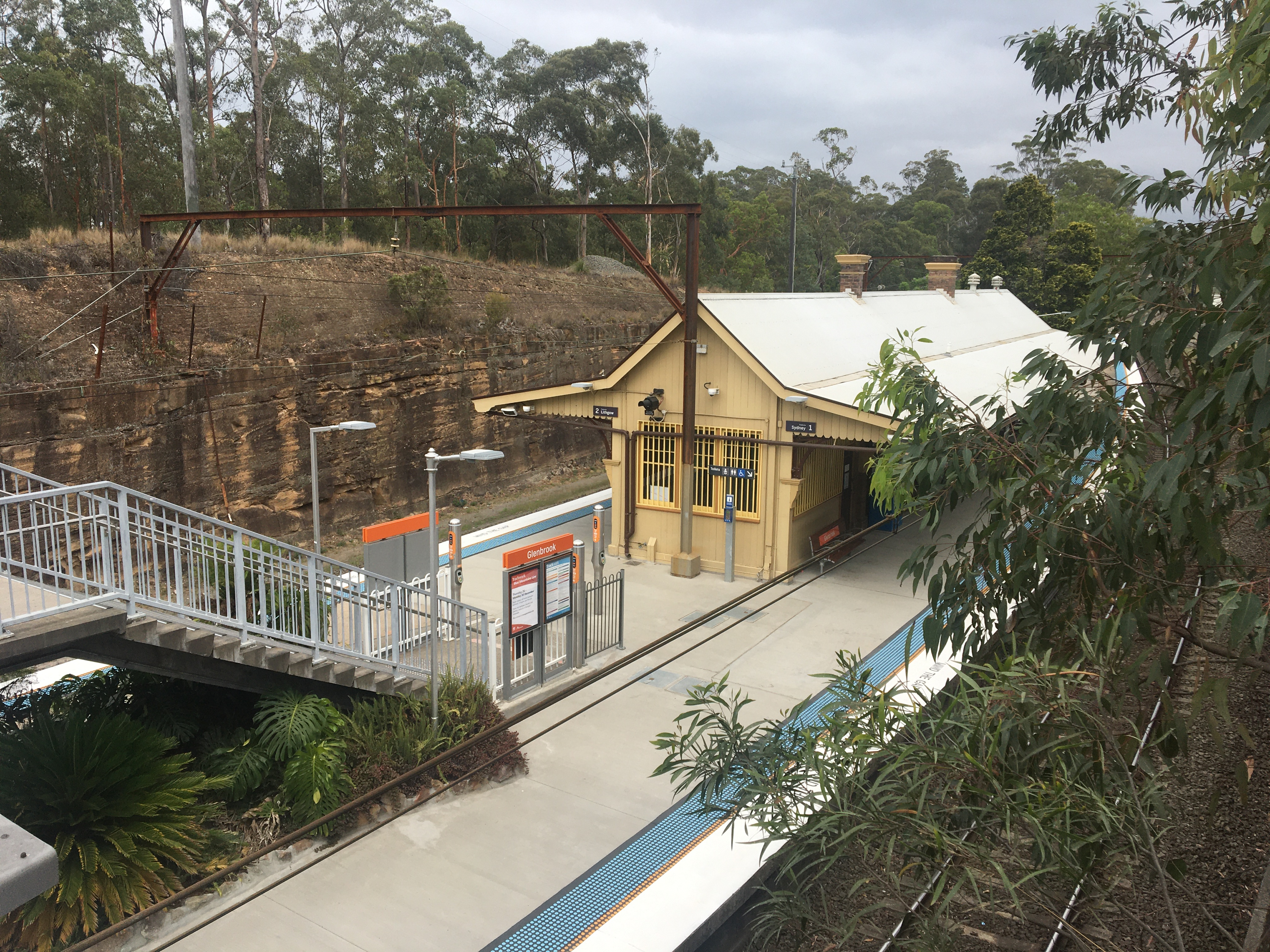
- Westbound view of platforms, stairs and station building, December 2019

General information
- Location: Burfitt Parade, Glenbrook; Australia
- Coordinates: 33°46′09″S 150°37′15″E
- Elevation: 167 metres (548 ft)
- Owner: Transport Asset Manager of New South Wales
- Operator: Sydney Trains
- Line: Main Western
- Distance: 67.08 kilometres (41.68 mi) from Central
- Platforms: 2 (1 island)
- Tracks: 2

Construction
- Structure type: Ground
- Parking: Yes
- Accessible: Yes

Other information
- Status: Weekdays: Staffed: 6.10am to 10.40am, 2.30pm to 7pm: Weekends and public holidays: Unstaffed
- Station code: GBR
- Website: Transport for NSW

History
- Opened: 11 May 1913

Passengers
- 2025: 190,563 (year); 522 (daily) (Sydney Trains)

Services
Preceding station	Intercity Trains	Following station
Blaxland towards Lithgow	Blue Mountains Line	Lapstone towards Central
Blaxland towards Lithgow	Blue Mountains Line Limited express	Emu Plains towards Central
Location

Glenbrook railway station is a heritage-listed railway station located on the Main Western line in New South Wales, Australia. It serves the Blue Mountains suburb of Glenbrook.

== History ==
The station opened on 11 May 1913 after the construction of a deviation.

=== 1976 Glenbrook accident ===
On 16 January 1976, a four-car V set broke down south of Glenbrook station, when a 46 class locomotive collided with the back carriage, killing one person onboard, and injuring another ten.

=== 1999 Glenbrook accident ===
On 2 December 1999, a V set collided with the back carriage of the Indian Pacific after a signal failure and low visibility, south of Glenbrook station. Seven people were killed in the accident, and 51 were injured.

Until October 1990, there was a loop for westbound services opposite platform 2.

In December 2019, an upgrade which included a new lift was completed.

== Platforms and services ==
Glenbrook has one island platform with two faces. It is serviced by Sydney Trains Blue Mountains Line services travelling from Sydney Central to Lithgow.

Platform	Line	Stopping pattern	Notes
1	Blue Mountains Line	services to Sydney Central	
2	Blue Mountains Line	services to Springwood, Katoomba, Mount Victoria & Lithgow	

== Transport links ==
Blue Mountains Transit operates one bus route via Glenbrook station, under contract to Transport for NSW:

- 691: Penrith station to Mount Riverview

== Gallery ==
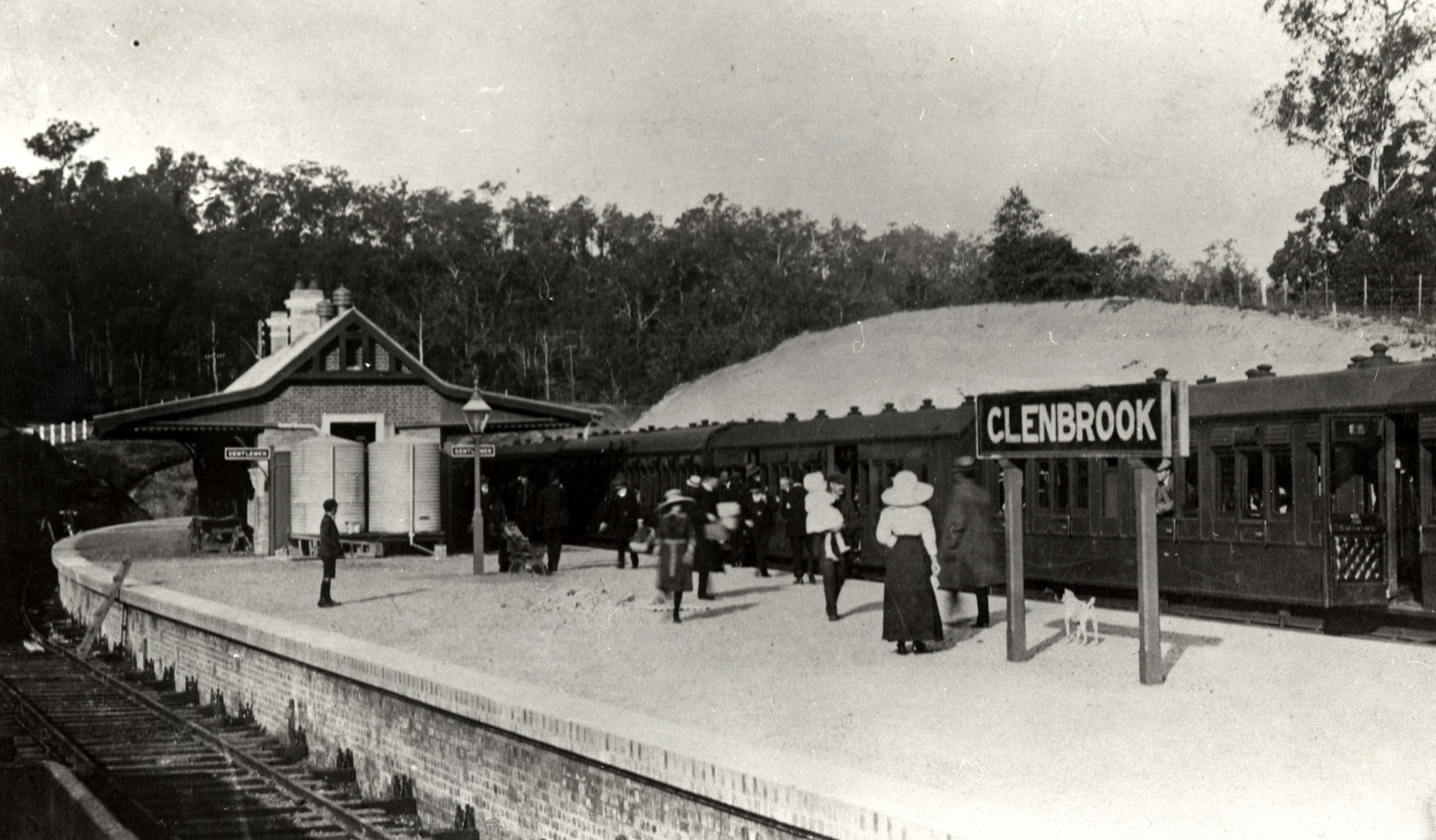
Historical view of the station
