= Blaxland railway station =

Railway station in New South Wales, Australia

Blaxland
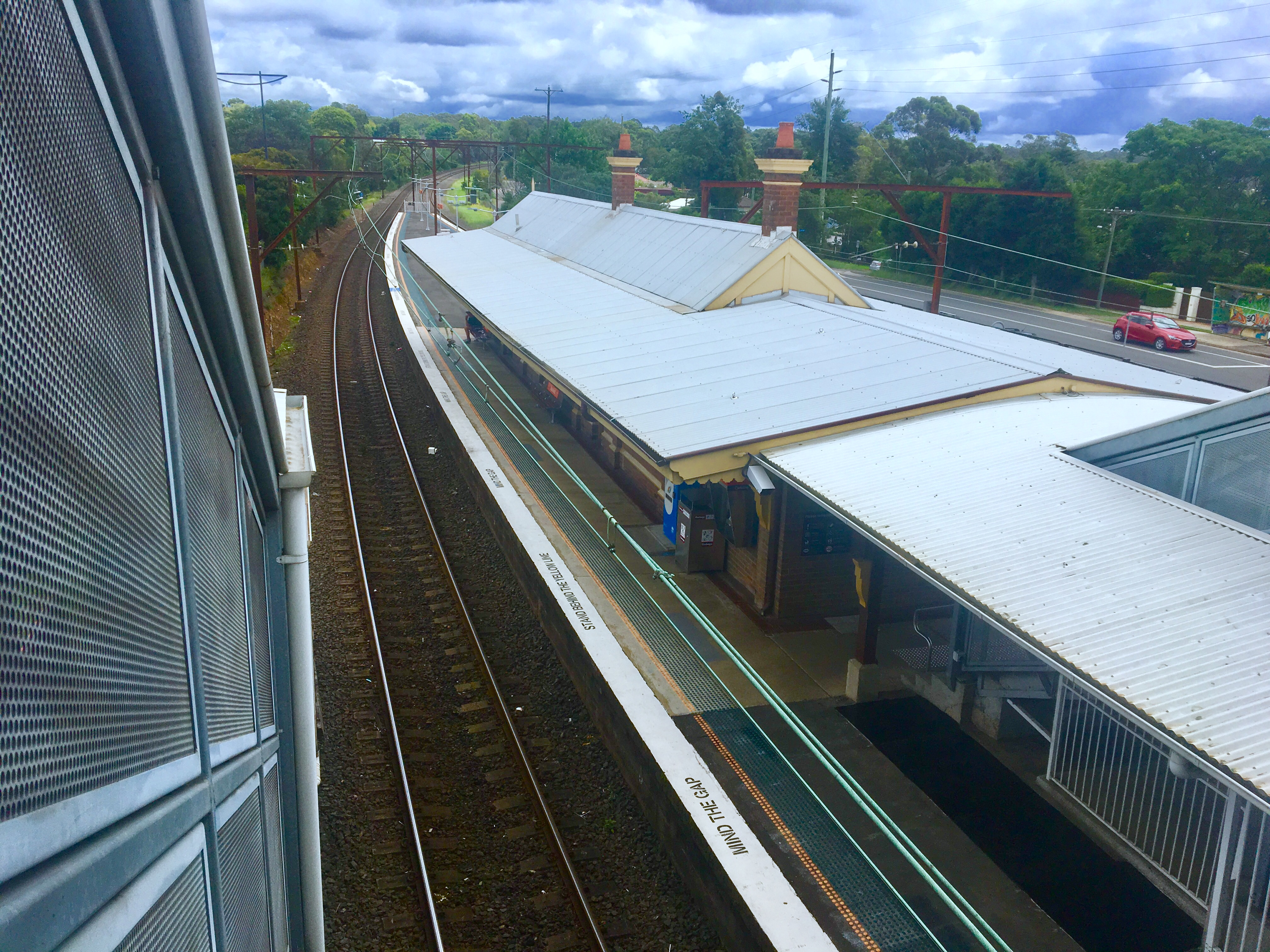
- Station platform and building viewed from footbridge, December 2018

General information
- Location: Station Street, Blaxland; Australia
- Coordinates: 33°44′37″S 150°36′35″E
- Elevation: 236 metres (774 ft)
- Owner: Transport Asset Manager of New South Wales
- Operator: Sydney Trains
- Line: Main Western
- Distance: 71.48 kilometres (44.42 mi) from Central
- Platforms: 2 (1 island)
- Tracks: 2
- Connections: Bus

Construction
- Structure type: Ground
- Parking: Yes
- Accessible: Assisted access

Other information
- Status: Weekdays: Staffed: 6am to 7pm: Weekends and public holidays: Unstaffed
- Station code: BXD
- Website: Transport for NSW

History
- Opened: 11 July 1867
- Former names: Wascoes (1867–1879)

Passengers
- 2025: 215,461 (year); 590 (daily) (Sydney Trains)

Services
Preceding station	Intercity Trains	Following station
Warrimoo towards Lithgow	Blue Mountains Line	Glenbrook towards Central
Springwood towards Lithgow	Blue Mountains Line Limited express	Glenbrook towards Central
Location

Blaxland railway station is a heritage-listed railway station located on the Main Western line in New South Wales, Australia. It serves the Blue Mountains suburb of Blaxland opening on 11 July 1867 as Wascoes, being renamed Blaxland on 21 April 1879.

== Platforms and services ==
Blaxland has one island platform with two sides. It is serviced by Sydney Trains Blue Mountains Line services travelling from Sydney Central to Lithgow.

Platform	Line	Stopping pattern	Notes
1	Blue Mountains Line	services to Sydney Central	
2	Blue Mountains Line	services to Springwood, Katoomba, Mount Victoria & Lithgow	

== Transport links ==
Blue Mountains Transit operates two bus routes via Blaxland station, under contract to Transport for NSW:

- 690P: Springwood station to Penrith station
- 691: Mount Riverview to Penrith station
