= New South Wales Heritage Database =

Database maintained by the Office of Environment and Heritage (NSW, Australia)

New South Wales Heritage Database, or State Heritage Inventory, is an online database of information about historic sites in New South Wales, Australia with statutory heritage listings.

== Contents ==
It holds the information about sites listed on the New South Wales State Heritage Register (over 1,650 entries) in addition to sites on heritage lists managed by New South Wales local government authorities and other statutory heritage registers.

This is an online database holding information about historic sites but is not in itself a heritage register. An historic site can have multiple entries in this database if it is listed multiple heritage registers. For example, Young railway station is on three heritage registers and therefore has three entries in the database.

== Licensing ==
The database is licensed CC BY except for material identified as being the copyright of third parties.
