= The Fish (train) =

Passenger train service in Australia

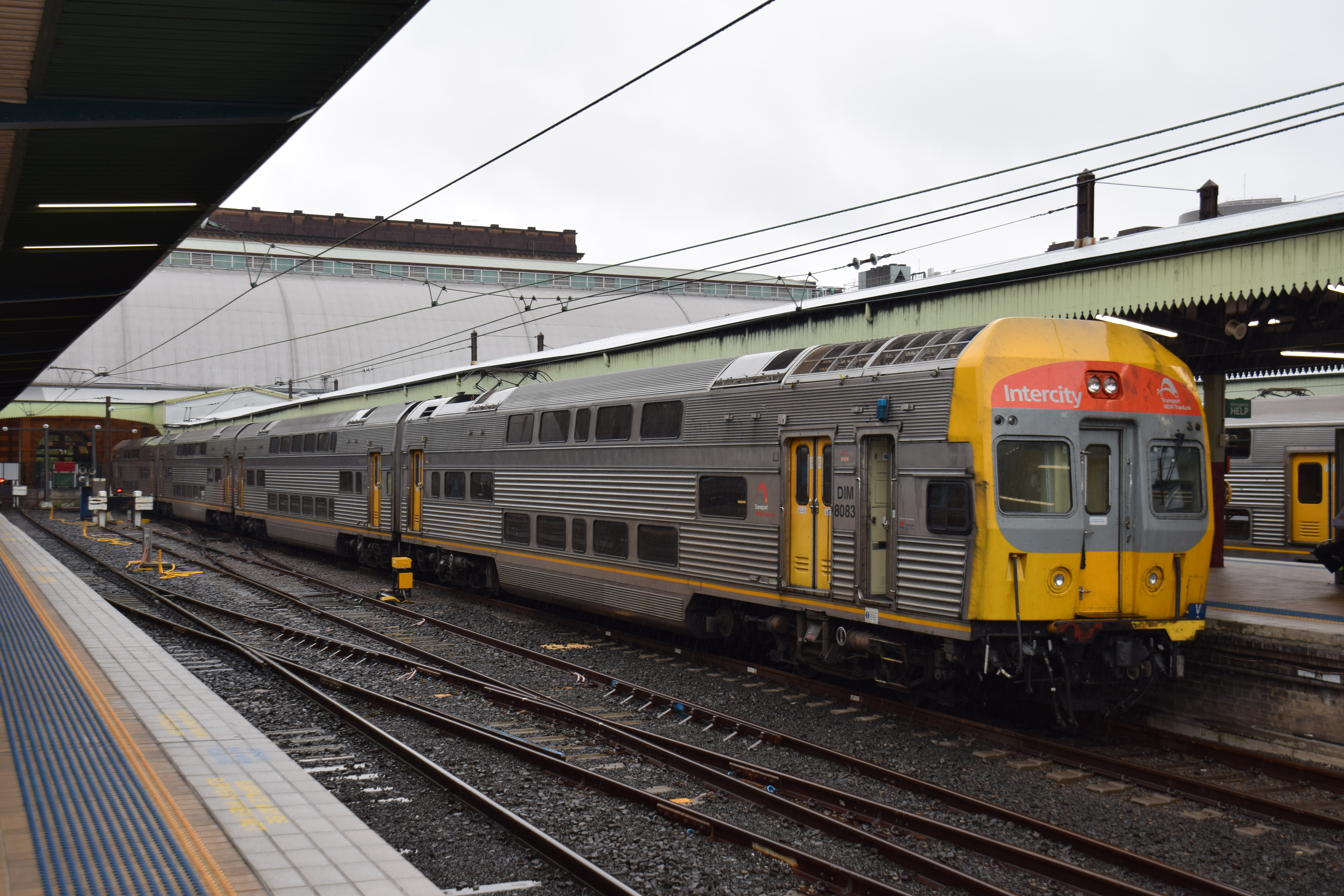
- NSW TrainLink V set at Central

Overview
- Service type: Passenger train service
- Current operator: NSW TrainLink

Route
- Termini: Lithgow; Sydney
- Distance travelled: 156 kilometres
- Service frequency: Daily in each direction
- Line used: Main Western

Technical
- Rolling stock: V sets

The Fish is the legacy name for the passenger train that operates over the Blue Mountains between Lithgow and Sydney, Australia.

== History ==
In the 19th century, a train from Sydney to Penrith was driven by John Herron, accompanied by fireman John Salmon and guard John Pike. These names lent themselves to the train's resulting name.

It is complemented by another service, The Chips and used to also run with The Summit and The Heron.

According to the current timetable, The Fish leaves Lithgow at 5:08 am, reaches Mt Victoria at 5:37 am and arrives Sydney at 7:47 am. The Chips leaves Lithgow at 5:38 am, reaches Mt Victoria at 6:07 am and arrives Sydney at 8:17 am.
