= The Chips (train) =

Passenger train in Australia

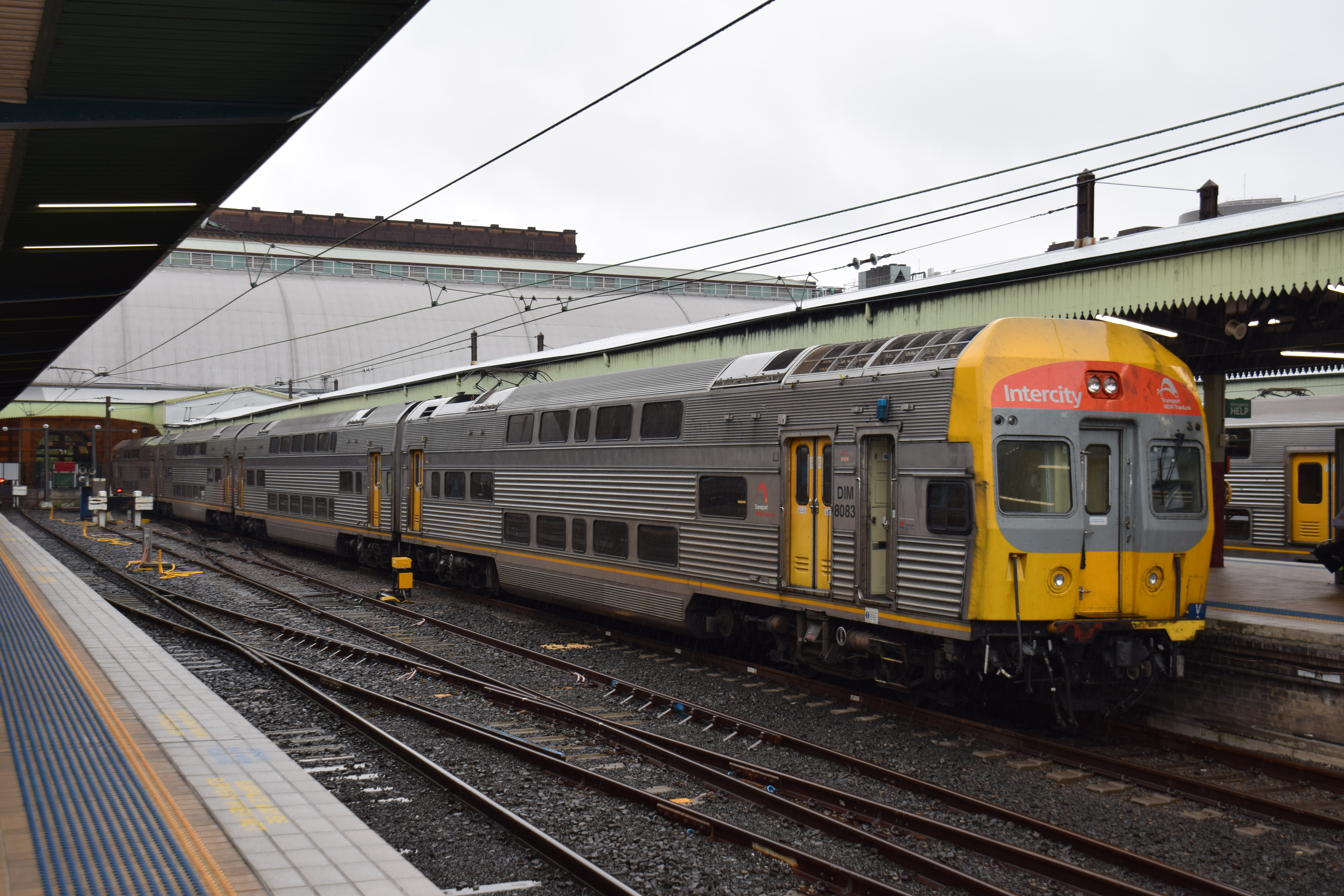
- NSW TrainLink V set at Central

Overview
- Service type: Passenger train
- Current operator: NSW TrainLink

Route
- Termini: Lithgow; Sydney
- Distance travelled: 156 kilometres
- Service frequency: Daily in each direction
- Line used: Main Western

Technical
- Rolling stock: V sets

The Chips is the legacy name for the passenger train that operates over the Blue Mountains between Lithgow and Sydney.

From late 2017, the name is unofficial and over the years, has not formally been used to refer to the Blue Mountains Line service run by NSW TrainLink.

The name has been applied to various Blue Mountains line train services over the years and as of April 2014 is a commuter service from Lithgow to Sydney operated by V sets.

Following electrification of the Main Western line in 1958, it was operated by U set single-deck electric trains. These in turn were replaced by double-deck V sets.

It is complemented by another service, The Fish.

According to the current timetable, The Fish leaves Lithgow at 5:17 am, reaches Mount Victoria at 5:48 am and arrives Sydney at 8:02 am. The Chips leaves Lithgow at 5:47 am, reaches Mount Victoria at 6:18 am and arrives Sydney at 8:32 am.
