= Cowan rail accident =

1990 passenger train accident in Australia

Details
- Date: 6 May 1990; 7:20 pm
- Location: Brooklyn, New South Wales
- Coordinates: 33°33′16″S 151°11′47″E
- Country: Australia
- Line: Newcastle and Central Coast railway line
- Operator: 3801 Limited, CityRail
- Incident type: Collision
- Cause: Signaling fault

Statistics
- Trains: 2
- Deaths: 6
- Injured: 106

At 7:20 pm AEST (UTC +10) on 6 May 1990, locomotive 3801, returning from the Morpeth Jazz Festival, was struck in the rear by a following CityRail inter-urban passenger service. The steam train had stalled while attempting to climb the steep gradient from the Hawkesbury River to Cowan, New South Wales, and it was found that sand applied to the rails to regain traction had interfered with the signals and given the following train a false clear indication.

== Incident ==
The crash occurred approximately 5 kilometres (3.1 mi) south of Brooklyn, New South Wales, near the Boronia No. 3 tunnel. The railway line at this point, known as the Cowan Bank, is 2.5% (1 in 40) grade and, as the special hauled by steam locomotive 3801 passed southwards through the No. 3 tunnel, the wheels of the locomotive started to slip. The driver of 3801 applied sand to the rails to improve traction, but the train came to a complete stop approximately 50 metres clear of the tunnel. Passengers on the steam train reported seeing a signal fluctuating aspects between green and yellow. The following CityRail V set inter-urban train, which had been halted at the northern entrance to Boronia No. 4 tunnel for 10 minutes by a red stop signal, received a green indication and proceeded, colliding with the steam train shortly after.

The impact killed the driver of the inter-urban train, Gordon Hill, and a passenger who was riding in its cab, as well as four passengers in the rear carriage of 3801's train. The passengers killed were the recently retired Vice Chancellor of the University of Sydney, John Manning Ward, his wife and daughter, and the wife of the University's Registrar. 99 passengers were injured, 11 of those seriously. The force of the crash completely destroyed the last carriage of the steam train, and was enough to break the locomotive coupling and push the engine 12 metres forward.

A subsequent coronial inquiry, headed by NSW State Coroner Derrick Hand, found in December 1990 that the sand that had been applied to the track by 3801 to aid traction had insulated the train from the rails, meaning that the track circuits failed to detect the presence of the first train, allowing the following inter-urban train to be given a false green (clear) aspect (known as a wrong-side failure). Mr Hand also considered it likely that a passenger on 3801 had applied a handbrake on the third carriage, and that this, combined with the heavy load, the steep grade and the curvature of the line, had prevented the steam train from restarting. No fault was found with the signalling system, although the coroner recommended that it be upgraded as soon as possible.

== Contributing factors ==
The coronial inquest identified:

- The application of sand to the rails for traction interfered with track circuits and caused a false "clear" signal for the pursuing interurban train.
- No mechanism (at the time) for train-to-train or train-to-signalman communication (communication with signal boxes was only possible by track-side phones).
- A handbrake in one of the steam train's carriages may have been partially applied, the inquiry found, to cause the train to slow down.

== Outcomes ==
- An interim ban was placed on the use of steam locomotives on the New South Wales railway network. The ban was lifted nine months later.
- Stricter guidelines on traction aids for steam operations and improved coordination between signal systems and special train movements.
- Board advocacy for integrating mobile and radio communications into rail emergency protocols, influencing subsequent investments in reliable on-board and trackside communication systems across the network.

== See also ==
- 1976 Glenbrook rail accident
- 1999 Glenbrook rail accident
