= Train stop =

Railway safety device

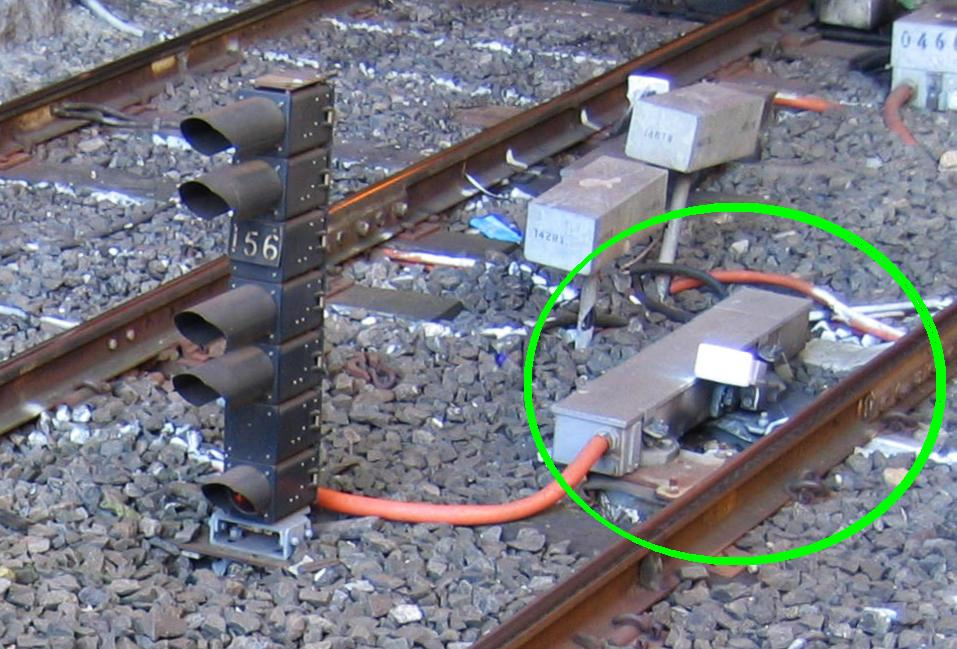
A signal with associated trip arm in the raised position (circled)

Part of a railway signalling system, a train stop, trip stop or tripcock (sometimes called a tripper) is a train protection device that automatically stops a train if it attempts to pass a signal when the signal aspect and operating rules prohibit such movement, or (in some applications) if it attempts to pass at an excessive speed.

== Basic operation ==
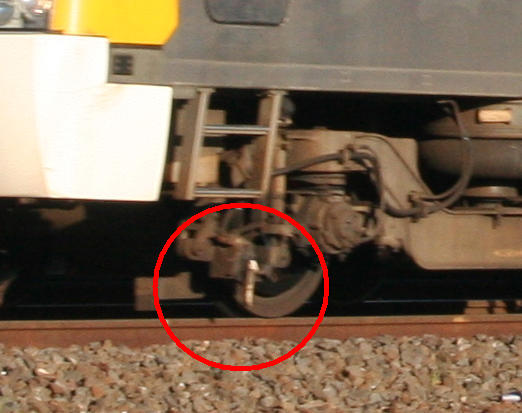
Train-mounted trip cock, located on the leading bogie of a Siemens EMU

The train stop system comprises two basic components. One is the trip arm mechanism, mounted on the ground adjacent to the rail, which essentially consists of a spring-loaded arm connected to an electric motor (or pneumatic cylinder in electro-pneumatic systems). The other is the train-mounted trip cock, which is connected either directly or electrically to the train's braking system.

The trip arm is raised automatically whenever a train should be brought to a halt. When the signalling system determines it is safe for the train to proceed, the motor drives the trip arm down to the lowered position. The spring ensures that the trip arm is raised in all other situations, which is an essential fail-safe provision in case of failure of the electric or pneumatic power supply or of the motor driving the trip arm. If a train attempts to pass the signal with the trip arm in the raised position, the trip arm makes mechanical contact with the trip cock on the train, causing the train's brakes to be automatically applied, thereby bringing the train to a halt.

Wayside trip arms are adjusted so that they rise to a point approximately 2 1/2 in (64 mm) above the top of the running rail when in the stop position, and lower to approximately 1 in (25 mm) below the top of the running rail when clear. The time taken for the arm to rise or be lowered is approximately two seconds.

=== Restrictions ===
The mechanical train stops have been found to be relatively safe with their historic models from the 19th century to be still in use in the 21st century. Because of the quadratic force increments in relation to speed these mechanical systems are restricted to low speed applications. Their continued usage can be found in urban rapid transit systems with trains making no more than 100 km/h (60 mph). Whereas later contactless train stops require a working receiver on the train to initiate the emergency stop (as for PCCS or Indusi) the mechanical stops have initially been kicking the brakes directly.

Because the trip arm may hit the brake lever directly, there have been installations where every wagon of a train has a separate trip cock on each bogie that has brakes. Hence in some installations the trip arm will be folded back to the safe position only a few seconds after a signal has turned red in order to reduce wear (which is an actual security risk as shown in the 1995 Russell Hill subway accident). Because of wear the trip arms for the opposite direction on the same rail will be actuated along with the trip arm for the nominal direction.

Like many early systems a mechanical train stop does not inherently control speed. There were accidents where trains had overrun the overlap due to excessive speed. In order to externally control the speed of a train the operation of timed train stops has been deployed as it is widely used on the New York City Subway, where a second trip arm at a distance is folded down only a few seconds after a train has passed a check point. These expensive speed control systems are generally phased out in favour of a cab control computer that can continuously check a braking curve while approaching a signal.

== Types of train stops ==
There are three types of train stops:

- Trip stop - stops train trying to pass red signal
- Timed train stop - stops train moving too fast
- Fixed train stop - prevents any trains from passing a point

=== Trip stops ===
The trip arm is raised whenever the signal is not displaying a proceed aspect. If a train tries to pass the signal, the trip cock on the train strikes the raised trip arm and the train is brought to a halt. When the signal indicates it is safe to proceed (clear or caution), the trip arm is lowered, and a train is able to proceed without further hindrance. In some cases, the trip arm will not be lowered when the signal to which it applies is exhibiting a proceed indication, e.g. when subsidiary signals are cleared, forcing a train to trip before proceeding, thus ensuring that movements are conducted at safe speeds.

=== Timed train stops ===
With a timed train stop, the trip arm stays raised until the approaching train has occupied a track circuit on the approach for a period of time corresponding to a set speed. If the train approaches at a speed higher than the one that is set, the trip arm remains raised and trips the train to a stop. If the train approaches at a speed equal to or lower than the set speed, the trip arm lowers before the train arrives, and the train is able to proceed without further hindrance.

Some timed train stops require the driver to acknowledge a stimulus before the trip arm is lowered on a yellow signal.

For sections of track with lower speed limits (15–20 km/h; 9–12 mph) a simpler construction is also used. The trip arm rotates freely on a horizontal axis with a counterbalance attached to its lower end. If a train's speed is low, the arm will be rotated by the trip cock with a force insufficient to initiate braking. But if its speed is too high, force will be large due to the counterbalance inertia, causing the brakes to be applied.

=== Fixed train stops ===
With fixed train stops, the trip arm cannot be lowered. Fixed stops are positioned close to the end of a dead-end track, to stop a train before it runs out of track. They may also be used at the end of track sections beyond which certain trains should not pass, such as the end of electrified territory (e.g. Hamilton, NSW), or to test the automatic brake and tripgear of trains departing certain locations, e.g. storage sidings, near buffer stops.

A fixed train stop that is the last one on a running line in the reverse direction may, despite its name, be suppressed, as is the case with the associated "Fixed Signals" on the Sydney network. Suppression is needed because in Sydney, the rear trip cock on a train is always lowered, while in Melbourne, by contrast, suppression is not required because the trip cock at the rear of a train is always raised clear of any wayside trip arm.

Some railways and rail transit agencies use fixed train stops to protect workers in work zones by temporarily applying them at either end of the zone, preventing trains from incorrectly entering the work zone.

== Installations ==
In 1901, Union Switch and Signal Company developed the first automatic train stop system for the Boston Elevated Railway. This system was soon adopted by the New York City Subway and other transit systems in the United States. Similar systems were installed around this time on the London Underground system.

Because of its mechanical nature, the train stop has certain limitations in application. Severe snow and ice conditions, for example, could interfere with operation of the wayside trip arm. Its widest application, therefore, is on underground rapid transit lines, where conditions that might interfere with proper operation are readily controlled. It is also not suitable for high-speed operation, as the maximum speeds permitted often do not exceed 115 km/h (71 mph), citing risk of high impact forces breaking the arms.

Train stops on London Underground lines are gradually being phased out in favour of ATP and distance-to-go signalling. Train stops remain standard equipment on all Sydney Trains metropolitan passenger lines in New South Wales, and on the electrified suburban railway system in Melbourne, Australia.

The train stops on the Berlin S-Bahn were first installed in the late 1920s. They are named Bernauer Fahrsperre (or Fahrsperre Bauart Bernau) because of their testing and first installation on the Stettin Railway to the suburban town of Bernau. This was the first heavy rail rapid transit system with third-rail electrification in Germany. They are being phased out in favour of the ZBS system based on Eurobalises until 2025.

=== Trackside installation ===
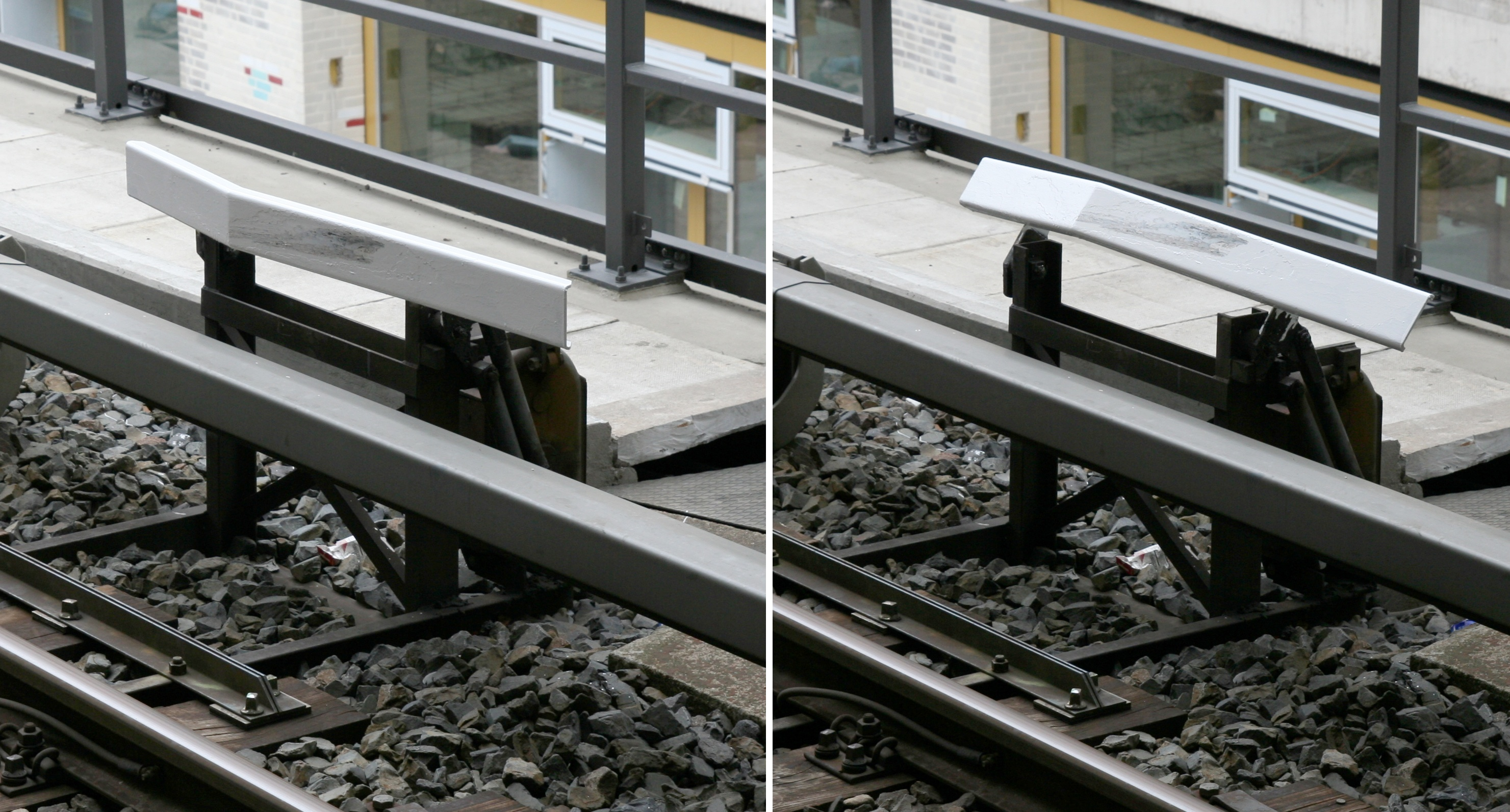
Train stop of Berlin S-Bahn

A train stop of New York City Subway, just north of the 125th street station

- Berlin S-Bahn rapid transit uses a metal bar as the trip arm, positioned at the height of the first bogie, on which the trip cock is placed. The metal bar (also named "Streckenanschlag" / track stop collar) folds away to allow passing. It is being replaced by ZBS until 2025.
- Berlin U-Bahn small profile underground railway used a metal stick as a trip arm, which hung over the track horizontally like a semaphore signal. The trip cock was on the roof of the first wagon (near the first door) almost looking like a lightning rod. The system was phased out in the 1960s (West), respectively 1990s (East) and replaced by an inductive train stop system.
- Berlin U-Bahn large profile underground railway used a mushroom-shaped swivel next to the right rail as a trip arm. The trip cock was mounted on the first bogie. This system was replaced likewise.
- London Underground uses a square-shaped metal plate that functions similarly to that on the New York City Subway system.
- Several lines on the Moscow Metro use a semi-circle that rotates into position when signals are red. All of them are on the right side of tracks as trains' trip cocks are fitted on the right side.
- New York City Subway uses a T-shaped metal bar rising from the floor as a trip arm; on the right side of the track for the A Division (numbered trains) and left side for the B Division (lettered trains). To allow trains to proceed it pivots down. A trip cock is mounted on the corner of the truck (bogie) of each car. The placement of the trip cock depends on the division the train runs on; some rolling stock is equipped with a trip cock on both sides. The train stop can be identified on the tracks because they are painted yellow for evidence if it has ever tripped a train.
- Sydney now uses the London Underground type J trip arm called the JA, except that it is mirror-image mounted on the left hand side of the track instead of the right hand side. A nearly identical system is used in Wellington.
- Toronto Subway also uses a T-shaped metal bar that rises from the floor except it is always on the right side of the track for all rolling stock because the trip cock is placed on the right side for all rolling stock.

== Reverse direction ==
When trains operate in the reverse direction, they may "back trip" on train stops applying to the normal direction, which is a nuisance. This may be avoided in one of three ways:

1. In Melbourne the rear trip cock is raised, although this runs the risk of runaways from terminal stations at high elevations.
2. In Sydney, the rear trip is always lowered, and trip arms in the opposite direction are "suppressed" so that they do not engage the rear trip cock. Trip cocks on intermediate cars, if any, are always raised.
3. In New York, when the signalling system clears motion in one direction (on bi-directional track or through an interlocking), it will automatically drive the trip arms which apply to the other direction. This is necessary because trip cocks are located along the entire length of trains in New York, not just the lead car.

On the London Underground there are many train stops on the Piccadilly line facing the opposite direction of travel. This is because they protect engineer's trains that often travel in opposite direction during engineering works.

== Proving ==
The mechanical trip arm is proved in the lowered position before the red light of its associated signal is extinguished. The trip arm is proved in the raised position before the track circuit following that signal is indicated as unoccupied. The proving switch detects the actual arm of the train stop, and breakage of that arm centres the switch neither depressed nor normal thus alerting operators to its failure.

== Tripping past, and accidents ==
When the signalling fails, etc., it may be necessary to "trip past" a train stop in the danger position, in accordance with the rules. With the train now working "on sight" it is important to travel at a low speed. If low speed is not maintained, then accidents can occur, such as

- Roseville collision, 1950
- Berala train collision, 1952
- Glenbrook rail accident, 1999

== Depiction ==
The car chase scene in the motion picture The French Connection shows a train stop being struck by a New York City elevated subway train as it approaches the train ahead of it on the same track. Although the moving train hits the train stop and begins to slow down, for the purposes of the film sequence, it was supposedly traveling too fast to reach a full stop before colliding with the train ahead.

== See also ==
- Automatic train protection (ATP)
- Automatic warning system - does not enforce a stop at a red signal
- Cab signalling
- Catch points
- Dead man's switch
- Derail
- Indusi or PZB - German train protection system
- Moorgate control
- Railway signal
- Train Protection & Warning System (TPWS)
