= Roseville train collision =

Railway collision near Roseville, New South Wales, Australia

The Roseville train collision on 29 July 1950 was a railway collision near Roseville, New South Wales in Australia of the "signal at danger tripped past in accordance to the rules" type.

== Accident ==
On the morning of 29 July 1950, trains were "running late and out of timetable order." The train driven by Driver Barrett found the departure signal at Roseville railway station at stop (red), and in accordance with the rules "tripped" past the train stop. However he went too fast, and the train ran into the rear of a stationary train ahead. Shortly after this a third train, approaching round a curve from the opposite direction, collided with the wreckage.

Guard Cross was in a guard's only compartment in the second-last car of his eight-car train. This car was a trailer, which had no speedometer.

The train is said to have reached a speed of 40 miles per hour after tripping past. This is too fast. The normal speed on the line was 50 miles per hour.

In one report Driver Barrett said that he was doing 15 miles per hour after tripping past.

Carriages fitted with continuous air (or vacuum) brakes usually have a valve in each car whereby the brakes may be applied in an emergency. One such occasion was also at Roseville on 1908 when the guard fell off the train and a passenger applied the brakes. Penalty notices warn against improper usage.

Driver Barrett reported that he had a coughing fit after tripping past the red signal, and that he had thus been distracted.

One report outlined this problem in more detail. The driver had been on sick leave, and this was his first day back on duty. He said he had been coughing all the way from Wynyard, eight stations away. He blamed the coughing for the accident.

== Injuries ==
All three trains were lightly loaded, so that only 12 passengers were injured. The two down trains were in the counter-peak direction, while the up train in the peak direction had just left at Lindfield on platform 2, the terminating platform, with most up passengers waiting on platform 1.

Other reports say that 11 people were injured.

== Carriages ==
In the 1950s, single deck trains, consisting of two sets of four cars (totalling 8 cars in all), often had 1 wooden car per 4 car set. The rest of the set were steel cars, which tend to be stronger than wooden cars in a collision.

In the 1950s, the guard's position in the train varied. It could be in a trailer car as car 6 or 7 (a steel car with no speedometer on view), or in car 4 or 5 (a steel or wooden car, which may or may not have a speedometer on view). The guard would have always have access to the air brakes which could stop the train.

== Aftermath ==
The Board of Inquiry consisted of 3 men:

Driver Barrett accepted full responsibility for the accident.

Of the six train crew involved, the Board of Inquiry absolves five, including Guard Cross, and except for Driver Barrett.

No departmental inquiry was held as "the cause of the accident was already known." One newspaper at least asks what steps will be taken to prevent similar accidents.

== See also ==
- Signal passed at danger with authority
- Glenbrook rail accident, another "trip past red signal" type accident.
- Railway accidents in New South Wales
