= 1976 Glenbrook rail accident =

1976 train collision

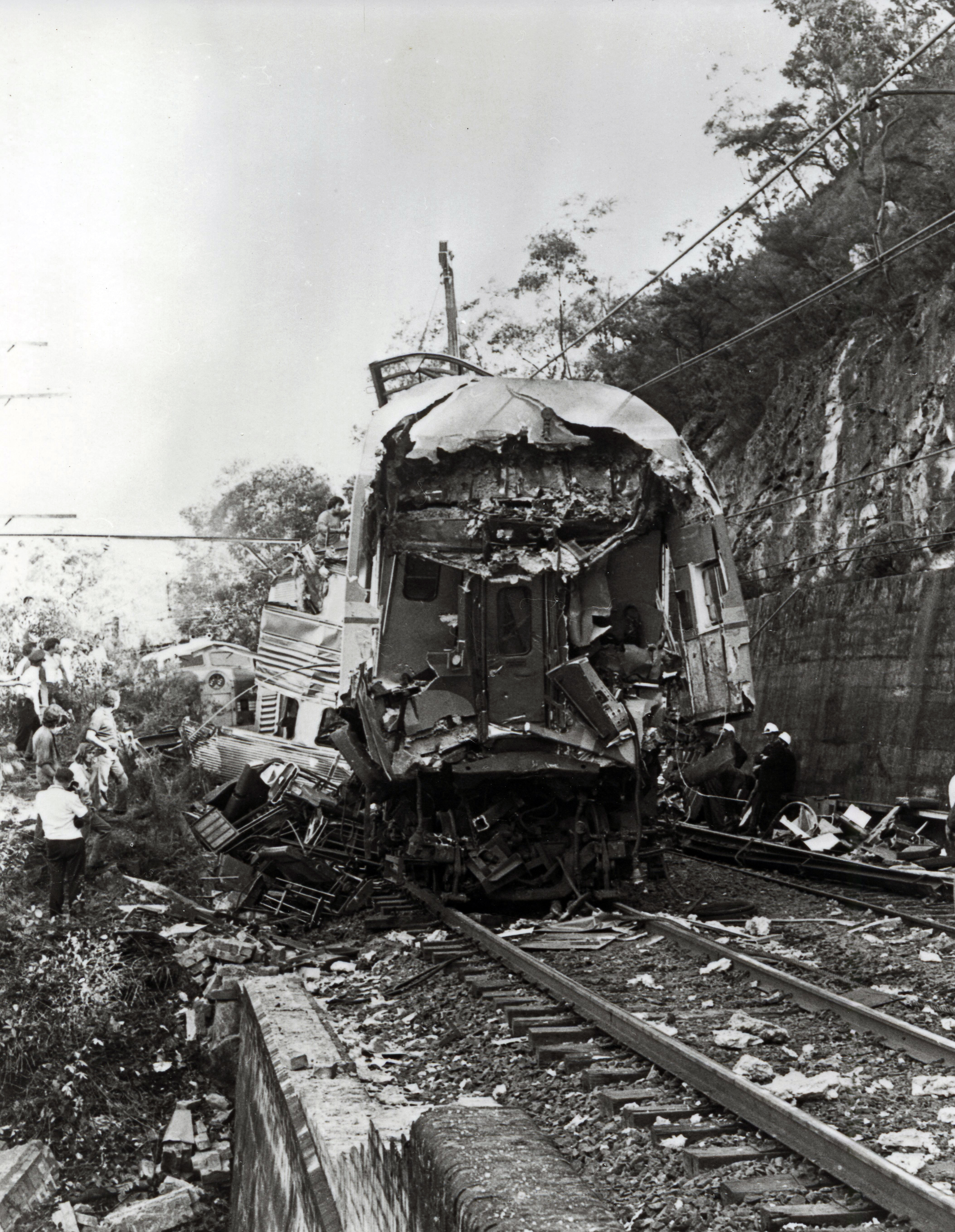
- The inverted face of carriage DCF 8004 in the morning after the collision.

Details
- Date: 16 January 1976
- Location: Glenbrook, New South Wales
- Country: Australia
- Line: Blue Mountains Line
- Operator: Public Transport Commission
- Incident type: Collision
- Cause: Breakdown and signal failure leading to collision

Statistics
- Trains: 2
- Deaths: 1

On 16 January 1976, at 10:45 pm AEDT, a New South Wales 46 locomotive collided with the rear carriage of a New South Wales V set commuter train at Glenbrook, killing one person onboard and injuring ten others. The collision occurred when the V set broke down and had transmitted a wrong-side signal, subsequently leading to the locomotive colliding with the train.

== Background ==
In 1972, the Public Transport Commission had controversially taken over all public transport services in New South Wales. The PTC's tenure was marked by severe financial austerity, prompting protests from the public and the rail unions. On 18 December 1975, activists at the Save Public Transport Campaign predicted that, due to deferred maintenance, a "major rail disaster" could occur anytime on the Main Western line between Emu Plains and Lithgow.

On 16 January 1976, train 4622, a freight train headed by 46 class locomotive, left Darling Harbour Yard at 8:20 pm AEDT, bound for Orange. Approximately one hour later, a V set commuter train left Central station bound for Mount Victoria at 9:30 p.m. Shortly after the V set passed through Glenbrook Tunnel, it broke down and stalled 500 metres (1,600 ft) before Glenbrook railway station. There were 40 passengers aboard. The driver at the front and the guard at the back left their positions to consult, which ultimately saved their lives.

== Incident ==
At 10:45 p.m., the locomotive collided with the V set, smashing into the back carriage, DCF 8004. This killed one passenger. The locomotive was also damaged in the collision. It hit with such force that it pushed the V set 50 metres (160 ft) forward, simultaneously inverting the face at the back of the train (see photo), and derailing two of the V set's carriages. One of the wagons in train 4622 overturned and nearly fell into a deep ravine, leading to the powerlines being brought down, blocking the track.

== Rescue ==
Immediately after the collision, rescue services were hastily sent to the location of the crash. Five out of the ten passengers injured were sent to Penrith Hospital (now called Nepean Hospital).

Many passengers were able to get off the train after the collision; however, twelve passengers were trapped in the upper level in the rear car by 1:30 a.m. on 17 January.

On 17 January, the rear carriage was cleared and was moved to clear the railway line. It was meant to be rested on an embankment, but it overbalanced and fell 400 metres (1,300 ft) down a deep gorge, where it broke in half on the way down. It settled on the gully at the bottom of the gorge which was part of the Blue Mountains National Park. It therefore led to the NSW National Parks & Wildlife Service issuing a directive to the Public Transport Commission saying that they wanted the carriage to be removed from the national park. The only way to accomplish this was to cut up the carriage and lift it out in sections using Royal Australian Air Force (RAAF) helicopters from the nearby RAAF Glenbrook.

== Aftermath and cause ==
This accident was caused by a wrong-side signal failure. The automatic signal behind the V set displayed "caution" when it should have been at "danger", thereby admitting the following locomotive into the occupied signal section.

In 2009, a memorial plaque was erected to commemorate the victims of the 1999 Glenbrook rail accident. The only victim of the 1976 collision was also commemorated in the plaque.

== See also ==
- 1977 Granville rail disaster — Involved a 46 class locomotive colliding into the supports of the Bold Street Bridge, in the deadliest rail disaster in Australia.
- 1990 Cowan rail accident — Involved a V set and 3801 under similar circumstances.
- 1999 Glenbrook rail accident — Also involved a V set and a locomotive in the same area, under similar circumstances.
- Railway accidents in New South Wales
