= 1999 Glenbrook rail accident =

Australian railway collision

Coordinates: 33.775328°S 150.62159°E

Glenbrook rail accident
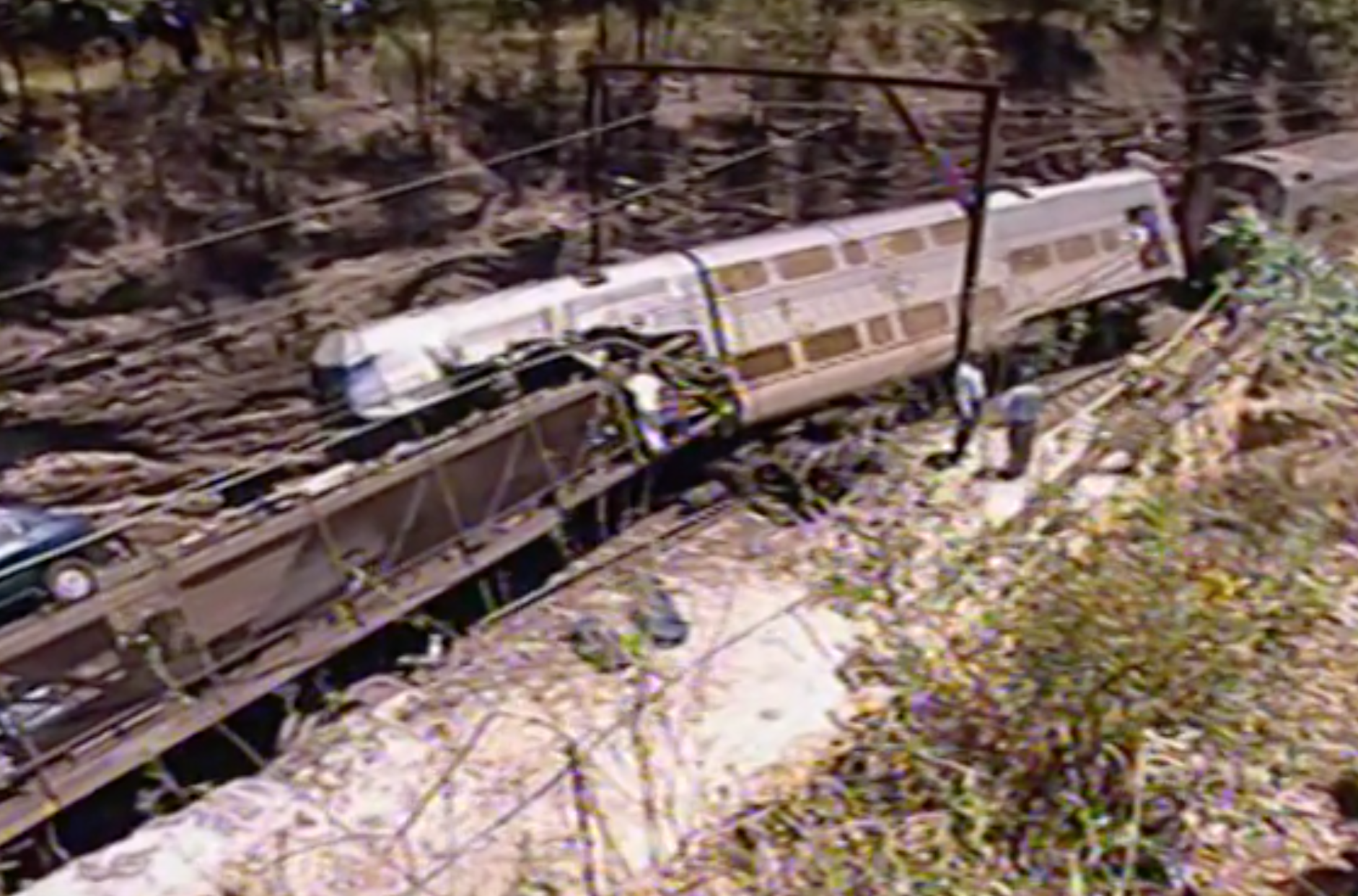

Details
- Date: 2 December 1999; 8:22 am
- Location: Glenbrook, New South Wales
- Country: Australia
- Line: Blue Mountains railway line
- Operator: Great Southern Rail, CityRail
- Incident type: Collision
- Cause: Signal failure and driver-signalman miscommunication

Statistics
- Trains: 2
- Deaths: 7
- Injured: 51

On 2 December 1999 at 8:22 am AEDT, a New South Wales V set collided with the rearmost carriage of the long-haul Indian Pacific on a curve east of Glenbrook railway station on the CityRail network between Glenbrook and Lapstone, in the Blue Mountains of New South Wales, Australia. Seven passengers were killed and 51 passengers were taken to hospital with injuries.

== Overview ==
The Indian Pacific train was authorised to pass a red signal at Glenbrook and stopped at the next signal, also red. The driver alighted to use the lineside signal telephone to call the signaller for authority to pass the signal at danger; as a component of the phone was missing, he incorrectly believed it to be defective. A delay of approximately seven minutes resulted despite the locomotive having a radio (at that time it was not a procedure for the National Rail Corporation to use a radio to contact signal boxes).

The interurban train restarted with authority after stopping at the red signal at Glenbrook and collided shortly after with the rear of the Indian Pacific train waiting at the second failed signal. Several factors were involved, from equipment breakdown to poor phrasing of the safe working rules: the most important was that the interurban picked up too much speed and the driver was not able to see the rear of the Indian Pacific around a sharp curve in a deep cutting in time to avoid a collision. This is essentially equivalent to a blind corner.

== Visibility ==
The track was curved to the left, the train was using the left-hand track, the driver was sitting on the left side of the train, and the track was in a narrow rock cutting. These four factors contributed to less than average visibility.

== Inquiry ==
A Commission of Inquiry headed by Justice Peter McInerney investigated the accident.

=== Causes ===
The Commission found that the accident occurred after a power failure disabled two consecutive automatic signals: due to their fail-safe design, both exhibited danger (red).

Both trains obtained permission from the signalman at Penrith to pass the first signal at danger. The driver of the Indian Pacific obeyed the rule requiring him to proceed with "extreme caution", but the driver of the interurban train failed to do so and caught up with the Indian Pacific.

The Commission found fault with a number of procedures, their application by railway employees, and the training those employees had received. Among other factors, it found that:

- the signalman was unable to monitor the position of the Indian Pacific, so was unaware it had not cleared the second signal;
- safety-critical communication was too informal;
- the train controller in Sydney told the driver of the interurban train by radio, "it's only an auto... just trip past", thereby potentially misleading the driver into believing that the signal section was clear; the signalman in Penrith was not aware of this exchange;
- the driver of the interurban train failed to proceed with "extreme caution", as required by the rule, and so was unable to stop in time to avoid the collision.
- training for passing signals at danger was deficient, as was the rule, safeworking unit 245.

=== Effects ===
The seven people who died were in the front compartment of the first carriage of the interurban train. The rear carriage of the Indian Pacific was a car transport wagon that did not convey passengers, and, in absorbing the brunt of the collision, was arguably the reason there were not any fatalities on board the Indian Pacific. The impact of the collision was such that the front six metres of the interurban car were compressed into just one metre, while also causing the first six carriages of the Indian Pacific to separate from the rest of the train. When the driver of the CityRail train saw the stationary Indian Pacific, he ran from the driver's compartment (the dead-man's brake was automatically activated) to the lower deck of the double-decker carriage warning the passengers to brace themselves. He was badly injured, but survived because of this. As he ran through, a man from the front compartment ran to the upper deck to warn the passengers and thereby also survived the crash.

A third train, bound for Lithgow, only narrowly avoided colliding with the wreckage when signallers managed to warn the driver to stop just 60 seconds before it reached the crash site.

=== The interurban train ===
The train was a standard four-car V set, labelled V21. The first carriage, DIM8067, received critical damage to its front and lower compartments, but it was repaired. To avoid any reference and insensitivity to the victims, it was re-numbered DIM8020 and remained in service until it was withdrawn in 2005 following many problems.

== See also ==
- 1976 Glenbrook rail accident – Involved a V set and a locomotive under similar circumstances, 23 years earlier.
- Roseville collision, 1950 – Tripped past red signal according to rules, similar to Glenbrook.
- Railway accidents in New South Wales
