= Blind corner =

Corner around which the view is obstructed

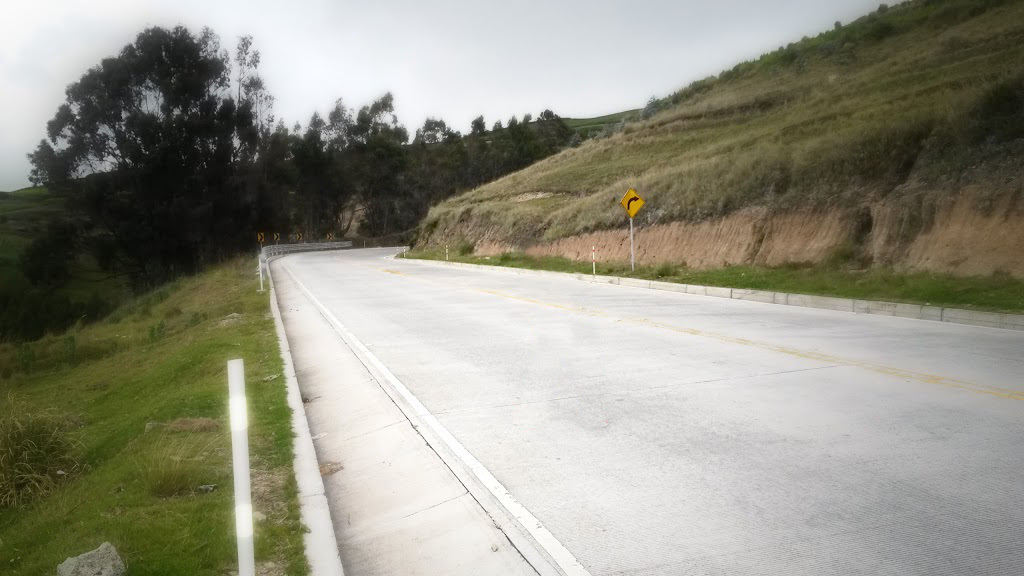
A blind corner on a hill. Oncoming traffic from around the corner cannot be seen.

A blind corner, blind turn or blind curve is a corner on a road where the view of what is behind the corner is obstructed. The view could for example be obstructed by buildings, hills or trees. Warning signs are often placed on such roads to warn traffic.

Vehicle-to-vehicle communication offers the possibility to reduce the risk of accidents on blind corners. Vehicles can use radio signals to see each other even when there is no line-of-sight and warn the driver. In the U.S., the Obama administration made a proposal to require vehicle-to-vehicle communication for new cars and light trucks, however, the first Trump administration set these plans aside. An alternative method that does not depend on all vehicles having radio transmitters is the use of sensitive lasers. The light from the lasers reflects off any nearby objects like people, cars or animals and allows a computer system in the vehicle to image those objects without a line-of-sight.

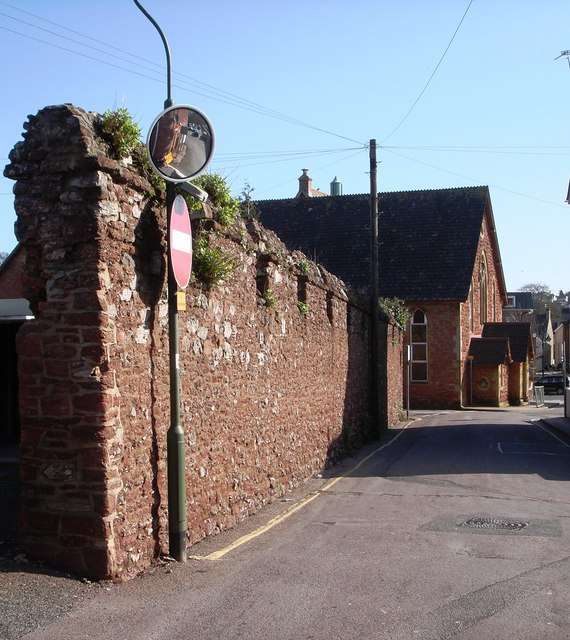
A mirror attached to a lamppost to allow drivers to see around the corner in Paignton, England

For private roads or blind corners inside buildings, the UK government suggests placement of mirrors to prevent accidents.

== Blind summit ==
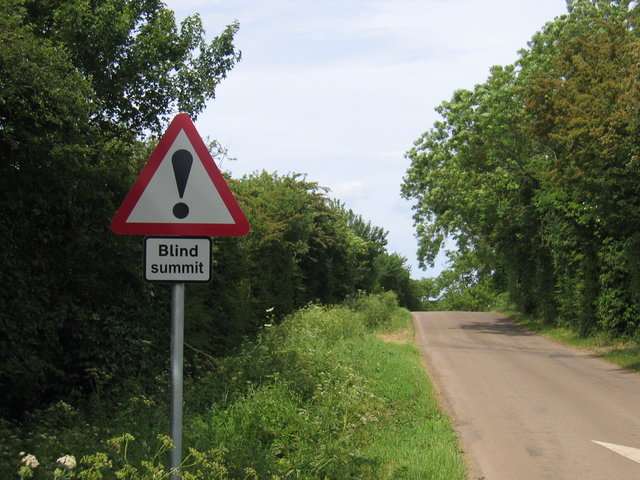
The UK sign for a blind summit and an example application

A blind summit occurs on inclined roads where oncoming traffic is hidden by the incline and cannot be seen. It poses a similar hazard to a blind corner but typically occurs on straight sections of road.
