= New South Wales V set =

Retired class of electric multiple unit operated in New South Wales

V set
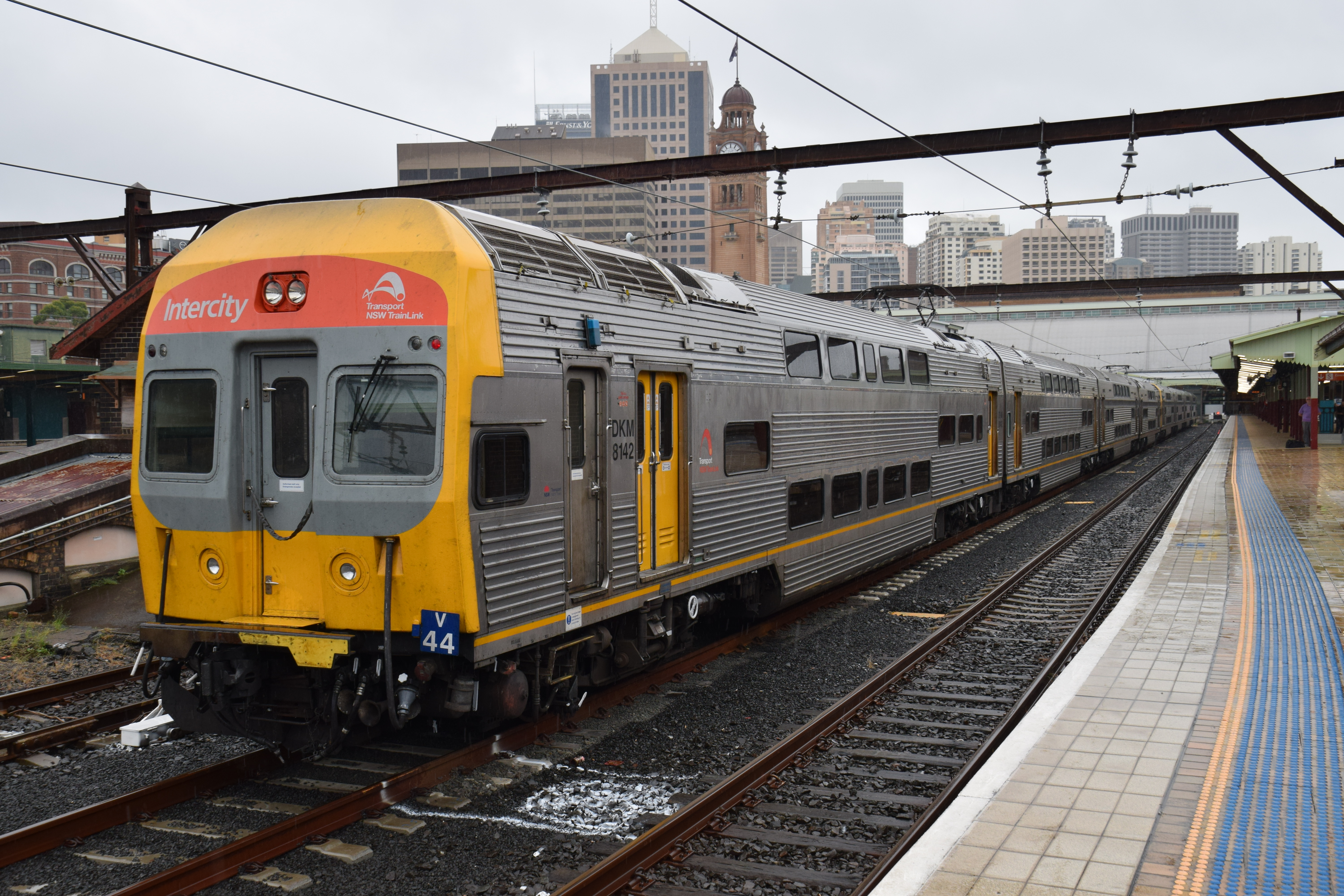
- V44 in NSW TrainLink livery at Central, March 2016

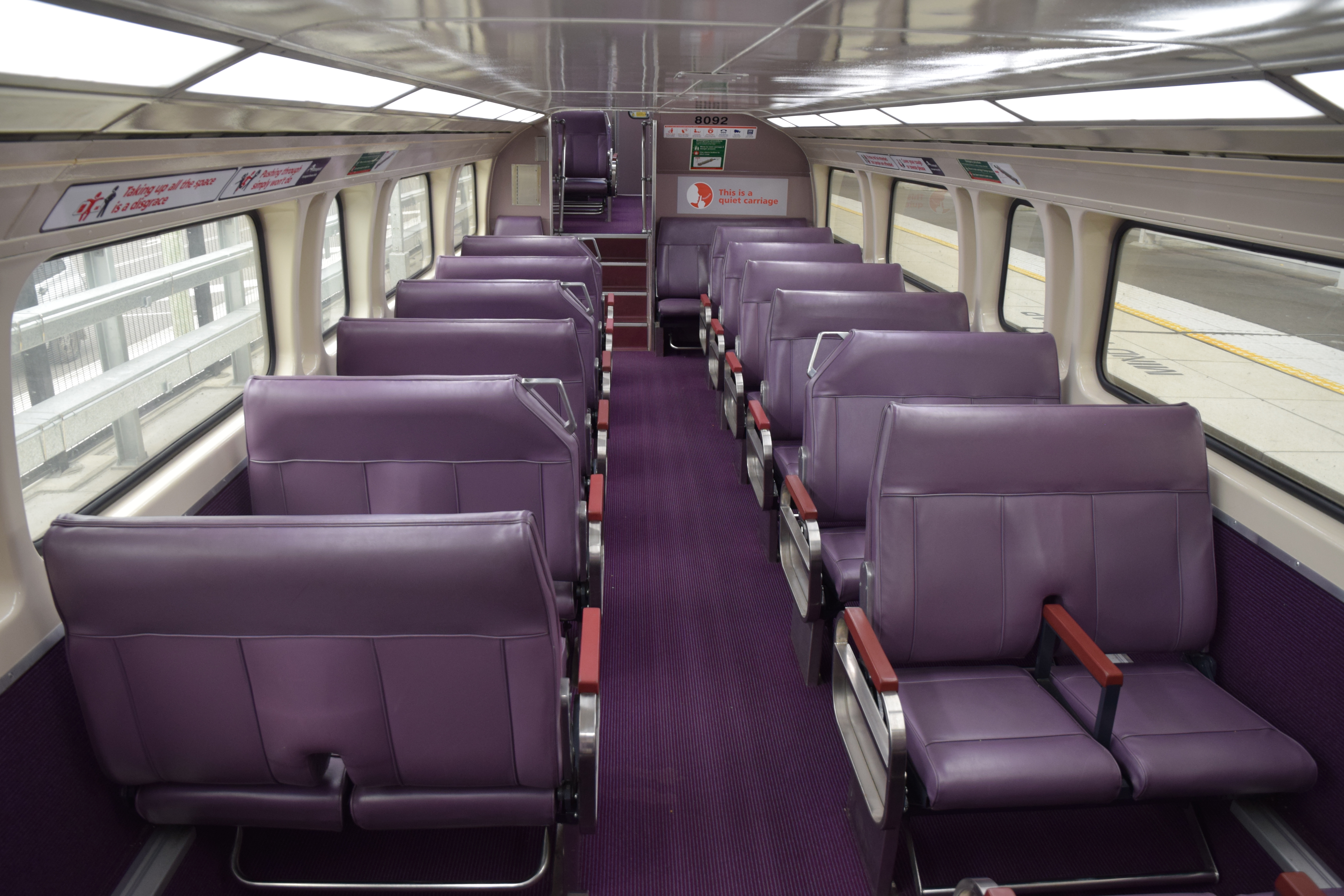
- Refurbished lower deck interior
- Stock type: Electric Multiple Unit
- In service: 1970–2005 (first batch); 1977–2026 (remaining batches)
- Manufacturer: Comeng
- Built at: Granville
- Constructed: 1970–1989
- Entered service: 22 June 1970
- Refurbished: 1982 (some), 1990s (some), 2002–2008, 2013–2016, 2023
- Retired: 2026
- Scrapped: 2005 (first batch), 2025–2026 (remaining batches)
- Number built: 246 carriages
- Number retired: 246 carriages
- Number preserved: 5 carriages (pending)
- Number scrapped: 165 carriages (76 pending)
- Predecessor: U sets
- Successor: H sets (first batch), D sets (remaining batches)
- Formation: 2, 4, 6 and 8-car sets Trains are formed of Driver Motor, Driver trailer and (Non-driver) Trailer cars.: Driver Motors: DCF, DCM, DIM, DJM, DKM, DTM; Driver Trailers: DDC, DCT*, DTD; Trailers: DIT, DKT, DTF, DTC; Converted to Trailers: DMT, DDT, DFT, DCT, DET, DTD*; *DCT cars were originally Driver Trailers but were converted into trailers and not renamed. DTD cars were created from converted DCT Trailers, and converted back to trailers around 2011 and not renamed.
- Capacity: DCF/DMT^ Cars: 92 seated; DDC/DDT^ Cars: 96 seated; DTF/DTC/DFT Cars: 100 seated; DCM Cars: 88 seated; DCT/DTD^ Cars: 94 seated; DIT/DKT Cars: 112 seated; DIM/DJM/DKM Cars: 96 seated; DET Cars: 104 seated; DTM Cars: 86 seated^ DDT cars may have had 4 additional seats added when their cabs were stripped out. Some DTD cars were later converted to trailers but retained the DTD designation, their cabs opened up but the guard seat not removed – increasing their capacity by 1 seat. DCM, DIM, DJM and DKM cars that were modified to accommodate wheelchairs and luggage racks post-2013 had 2 seats for the luggage racks and/or 4 seats* for the wheelchair spaces removed.: *DTM Cars had 2 seats removed for a wheelchair space in the 1990s, and if luggage racks were added another 2 seats were removed. Post-2013 these were modified to have 6 seats removed as with the DCM, DIM, DJM and DKM cars.
- Operators: Sydney Trains (2024–2026); NSW TrainLink (2013–2024); CityRail (1988–2013); State Rail Authority (1980–1988); Public Transport Commission (1972–1980); Department of Railways (1970–1972)
- Depot: Flemington
- Lines served: Blue Mountains; Central Coast & Newcastle; South Coast

Specifications
- Car length: 23,968 mm (78 ft 7 5/8 in) (end cars); 23,965 mm (78 ft 7 1/2 in) (intermediate cars)
- Width: 2,928 mm (9 ft 7 1/4 in)
- Height: 4,382 mm (14 ft 4 1/2 in)
- Wheel diameter: 940 mm (37 in)
- Maximum speed: 130 km/h (81 mph) (design); 115 km/h (71 mph) (service)
- Weight: 59–61 t (58–60 long tons; 65–67 short tons) (end cars); 40 t (39 long tons; 44 short tons) (intermediate cars)
- Traction system: Mitsubishi Electric: DCF-DCM-DIM cars: Camshaft resistance control; DJM-DKM cars: GTO–4-quadrant chopper control
- Traction motors: DCF cars: 4 × AEI-149BY 134 kW (180 hp) series wound DC motor; DCM-DIM cars: 4 × Mitsubishi 150 kW (200 hp) series wound DC motor; DJM-DKM cars: 4 × Mitsubishi MB-3303-B 170 kW (230 hp) 2-phase DC shunt-wound motor
- Power output: DCF cars: 536 kW (719 hp); DCM-DIM cars: 600 kW (805 hp); DJM-DKM cars: 680 kW (912 hp)
- Transmission: DCF cars: 4.35:1 (74:17) gear ratio; DCM-DIM cars: 4.61:1 (83:18) gear ratio; DJM-DKM cars: 4.94:1 (84:17) gear ratio
- Acceleration: 0.58 m/s^{2} (1.9 ft/s^{2})
- Electric systems: 1,500 V DC (nominal) from overhead catenary
- Current collection: Pantograph
- UIC classification: Bo′Bo′ (control motors); 2′2′ (trailers)
- Track gauge: 1,435 mm (4 ft 8 1/2 in) standard gauge

The V sets are a type of double-decker electric multiple units (EMU) that operated on the intercity network surrounding Sydney in New South Wales, Australia from 1970 up until 2026. Built by Comeng between 1970 and 1989 and first delivered under the Department of Railways, the sets are of stainless steel construction.

During its time in service, the V sets primarily operated along the Blue Mountains and Central Coast lines, and have travelled approximately 115,000,000 kilometres (71,000,000 mi) in total.

== History ==
=== Orders and contracts ===
The V sets were delivered over a 19-year period from 1970.

==== Series 1 ====
NSWGR Contract 8/68 – Comeng contract 68/11 – specification 2384 – entered service 1970

- DCF8001 – DCF8008 (8)
- DDC9001 – DDC9004 (4)
- DTF9011 – DTF9012 (2)
- DTC9021 – DTC9022 (2)

==== Series 2 ====
NSWGR Contract 2/76 – Comeng contract 76/3 – specification 2505 – entered service 1977 Oerlikon brake valves. Sigma Blue Light air conditioning. No crew air conditioning. Low dashboard. Coloured fault lights. Mesh Resistor covering on roof.

- DCM8021 – DCM8036 (16)
- DCT9031 – DCT9044 (14)

==== Series 3 ====
NSWGR Contract 3/80 – Comeng contract 79/5 – specification 2505 – entered service 1982 Davies & Metcalf brake valves. Sigma Blue Light air conditioning. No crew air conditioning. Low dashboard. Coloured fault lights. Mesh resistor covering on roof.

- DIM8037 – DIM8052 (16)
- DIT9101 – DIT9114 (14)

NSWGR Contract 3/80E – Comeng contract 8007 – specification 2505 Davies & Metcalf brake valves. Sigma Blue Light air conditioning. No Crew air conditioning. Low dashboard. Coloured Fault Lights. Mesh Resistor covering on roof.

- DIM8053 – DIM8068 (16)

==== Series 4 ====
NSWGR Contract 7/82 – Comeng contract 8205 – specification 2505 amended Davies & Metcalf brake valves. Sigma Yellow Light air conditioning. Crew air conditioning installed. Low dashboard (High from DIM8090). Text fault lights. Mesh resistor covering on roof.

- DIM8069 – DIM8092 (24)
- DIT9115 – DIT9138 (24)

==== Series 5 ====
A continuation of the contract for Series 4, these cars were fitted with Chopper controls. NSWGR Contract 7/82 – Comeng Contract 8205 – Specification 2505 CH Davies & Metcalf brake valves. Sigma Yellow Light air conditioning. Crew air conditioning installed. High dashboard. Text fault lights. Slatted covering on roof over Chopper equipment.

- DJM8093 – DJM8108 (16)
- DIT9139 – DIT9154 (16)

==== Series 6 ====
NSWGR Contract 3/86 – Comeng contract 8601 Davies & Metcalf brake valves. Sigma Yellow Light air conditioning. Crew air conditioning installed. High dashboard. Text fault lights. Slatted covering on roof over Chopper equipment.

- DJM8109 – DJM8123 (15)
- DIT9155 – DIT9169 (15)

==== Series 7 ====
NSWGR Contract 7/87 – Comeng contract 8701 Davies & Metcalf brake valves. Sigma Yellow Light air conditioning. Crew air conditioning installed. High dashboard. Text fault lights. Mesh covering on roof over Chopper equipment.

- DJM8124 – DJM8138 (15)
- DIT9170 – DIT9184 (15)

==== Series 8 ====
The final series. NSWGR Contract 1/88 – Comeng contract 8801 Davies & Metcalf brake valves. Yellow painted interior. Sigma Yellow Light air conditioning. Crew air conditioning installed. High dashboard. Text fault lights. Mesh covering on roof over Chopper equipment. Power operated vestibule doors (Now all isolated). Wide body side fluting, similar to that used by A Goninan & Co on their S sets. Spring Parking Brake in trailer car (Now all disconnected). Semi-permanently coupled 2 car blocks. These cars feature smoother body panels than the earlier cars.

- DKM8139 – DKM8145 (7)
- DKT9185 – DKT9191 (7)

=== First batch (DCF, DDC, DTF and DTC) ===
In July 1968, the Department of Railways New South Wales placed an order for the first batch 16 cars with Commonwealth Engineering. The first 4 cars debuted on the Sydney to Gosford route on 22 June 1970, targeted as F111. All 16 cars were in operation by September 1970.

These cars had many similar features to the later-built cars, including the one-piece moulded glass reinforced plastic end in royal blue and grey livery (earning them the Blue Goose nickname), semi-automatic doors, electronically controlled brakes and double-glazed windows. They had a different style of headlight and interior lighting to subsequent builds.

There were:

8 Power Cars – DCF 8001–8008 – Economy Class
4 Driving Trailer Cars – DDC 9001–9004 – 1st Class upper deck, Economy Class other seats
4 Trailer Cars – DTF 9011–9012 – Economy Class; DTC 9021–9022 – 1st Class upper deck, Economy Class other seats

The configuration of these cars was unsuccessful. The cars were fitted with AEI electrical equipments, using similar traction motors to the 1955 electric single deck train stock (U sets and W sets) but with a then brand new "Camshaft controller", for controlling power to the traction motors. The electrical equipments was split between the power and trailer car, the motor-alternator suffered from numerous failures, preventing the air-conditioning system and the air brake compressors from working.

The First Class seats on the upper deck of the DCC and DTC cars were finished in blue (compared to the brown of the other seats), as was the carpet they rested upon. No gangway doors between the exterior doors and passenger compartments were provided, though these were later retrofitted into the trains at an unknown date. The lighting and air conditioning vents were arranged differently compared to later series.

One class travel was introduced in September 1974, so the seating was all economy class. This led to the refurbishment of the DDIU sets with the original luggage racks above the seating in the single deck section being removed. During this time the sets were targeted as U sets, the plates used on the single deck interurbans.

In the early 1980s, it was decided to convert these to trailer cars hence 16 power cars were ordered with no matching trailers. Between March and December 1982 the cars were rewired at Electric Carriage Workshops, and the driver compartments of DDC and DCF cars removed, DCF cars having their crew doors removed and replaced by toilets in the same locations, while left over cab space would be used for luggage or potentially additional seats. The reinforced plastic ends remained, albeit with the blue eventually removed.

The cars were subsequently renumbered:

DCF 8001–8008 > DMT 9201–9207 (7 cars remained after writing off DCF 8004)
DDC 9001–9004 > DDT 9208–9211
DTF 9011–9012 and DTC 9021–9022 > DFT 9212–9215

In 2005, these sets were withdrawn and scrapped following the discovery of corrosion in the carbon steel under frames. The interaction of the stainless steel bodies and the carbon steel underframes caused galvanic corrosion.

=== Second batch (DCM and DCT) ===
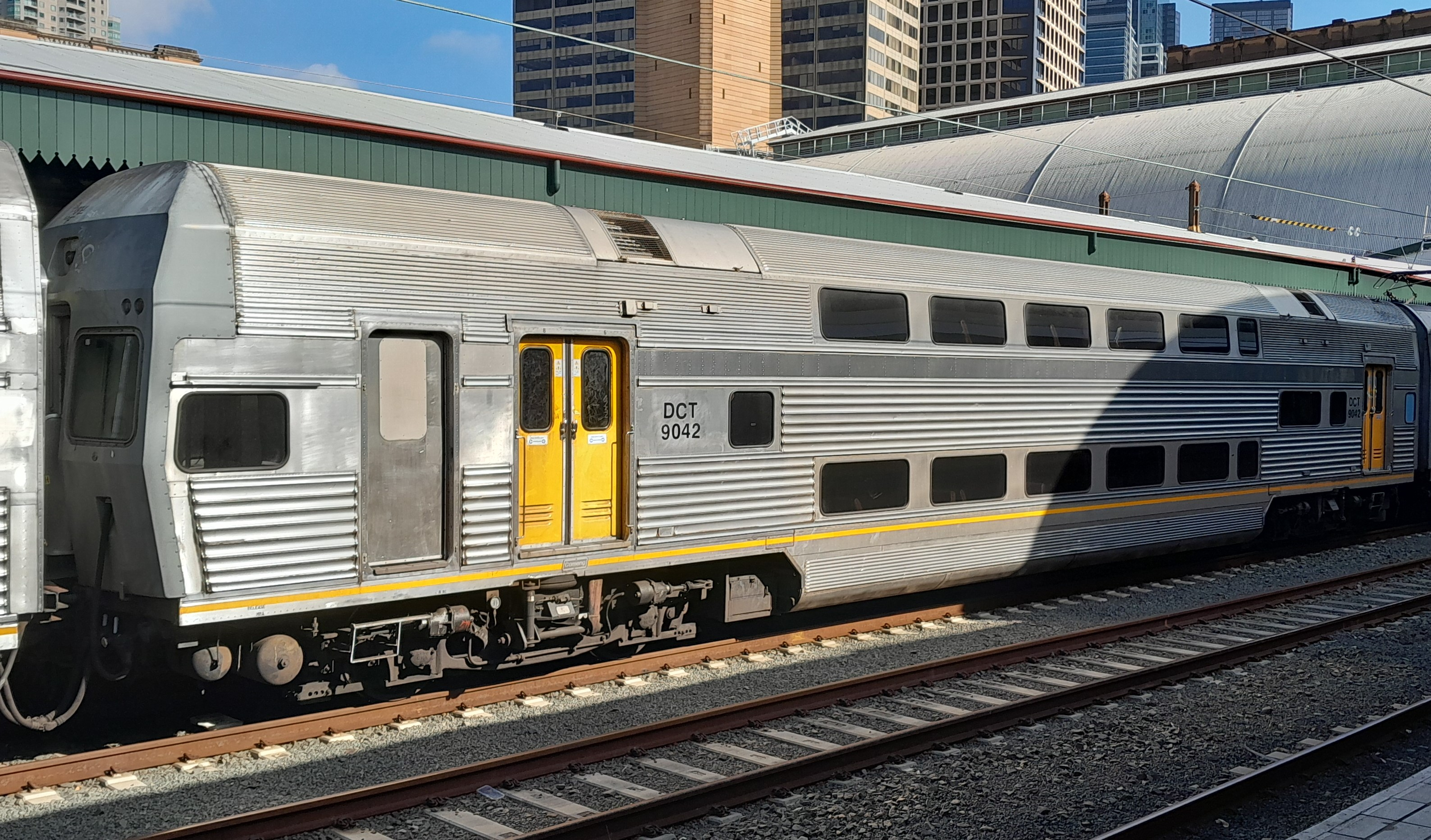
A DCT driving trailer that has been stripped of its control gear to become a standard trailer.

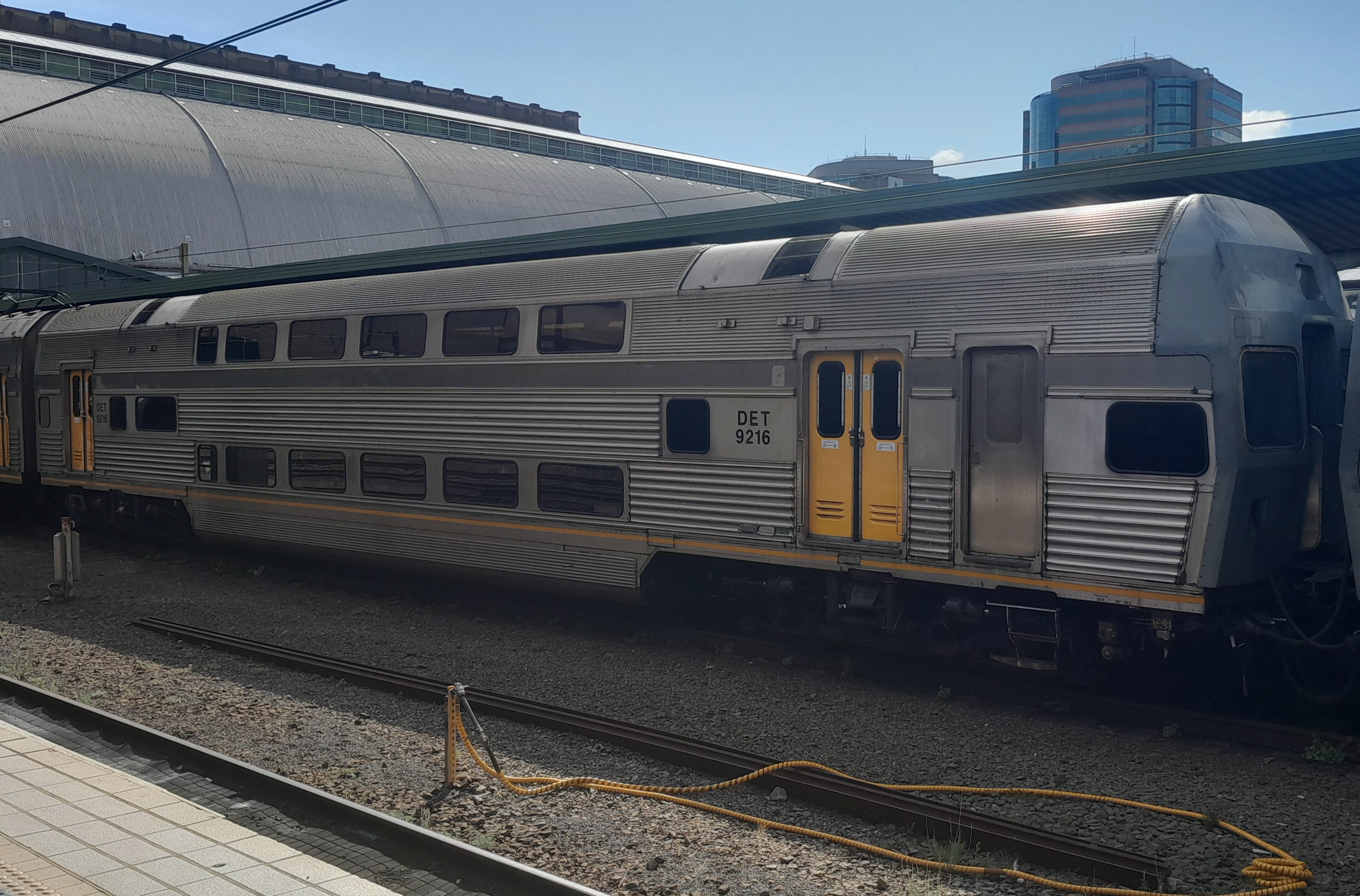
DET9216 (ex. DCT9034), the "Contura" car

From October 1977, the second batch began to enter service, with many differences from the first batch. The electrical equipment was all mounted on the power car, using Mitsubishi Electric equipment; they had stainless steel underframes; were fitted with vacuum retention toilets, and had gold as opposed to green tinted windows. These cars were the first of the V sets, which were the two-car equivalent of double deck U sets. These cars operated separately from the 1970 cars, as the two types were not compatible with each other.

The cars built were:

Power Cars – DCM 8021–8036
Driving Trailer Cars – DCT 9031–9044

The driving trailers were not used that much, due to driver complaints about an uncomfortable "kick" when the power car started to push the trailer. The controls in the DCTs were gradually stripped and used to replace defective controls in the DCMs. In 1990 DCT 9034 was refurbished by CityRail as a lounge car with lounge chairs and a kitchen for use as a charter car named Contura. It was not a success, not helped by poor marketing, and it was rebuilt as a conventional trailer (without controls) in 2000 and renumbered DET 9216. During the Citydecker refurbishment carried out by A Goninan & Co in the 1990s, DCT 9031–9036 had their driver controls reinstated and were recoded as DTDs allowing CityRail to introduce The River, a two-car service from Wyong to St Marys. At the same time the DCMs were refurbished, receiving destination indicators and ditchlights. The refurbishment also saw the installation of air-conditioning in the driver's cabs of the DCMs, their lack of air-conditioning had a union ban preventing them being used as leading cars since 1995. DCM 8032–8036 were modified to have wheelchair seating, and recoded as DTMs. The DCMs that had destination indicators eventually had them removed and replaced with a metal blanking plate, after a decision not to use them on Interurban services. Some were withdrawn in 2011, and were scrapped in November – October 2021.

=== Third batch (DIM and DIT) ===
From May 1981, DIM Power Cars and DIT trailers started to be delivered. These cars had increased seating compared with the earlier series, up from 88 to 96 for the power cars, and from 100 to 112 for the non-driving trailers. Like earlier cars, these were targeted as U sets, indicating 4-car sets. However, later on, all double decker sets were retargeted as V sets (the V originally used only for 2-car sets) in order to distinguish them from single deck U sets.

The cars built were:

Power Cars – DIM 8037–8092
Trailer Cars – DIT 9101–9184

DIM 8037–8068 and were the last cars to be delivered with the Blue Goose moulded fibreglass ends, cream and wood veneer interiors and green seats.

DIM 8069–8092 were built with a white moulded fibreglass end incorporating the State Rail Authority's corporate colours of red, orange and yellow, yellow interiors, newer air conditioning technology and ditchlights. These can be distinguished from the earlier DIMs by the air-conditioning grille cover.

==== DJM cars and remaining DIT cars ====
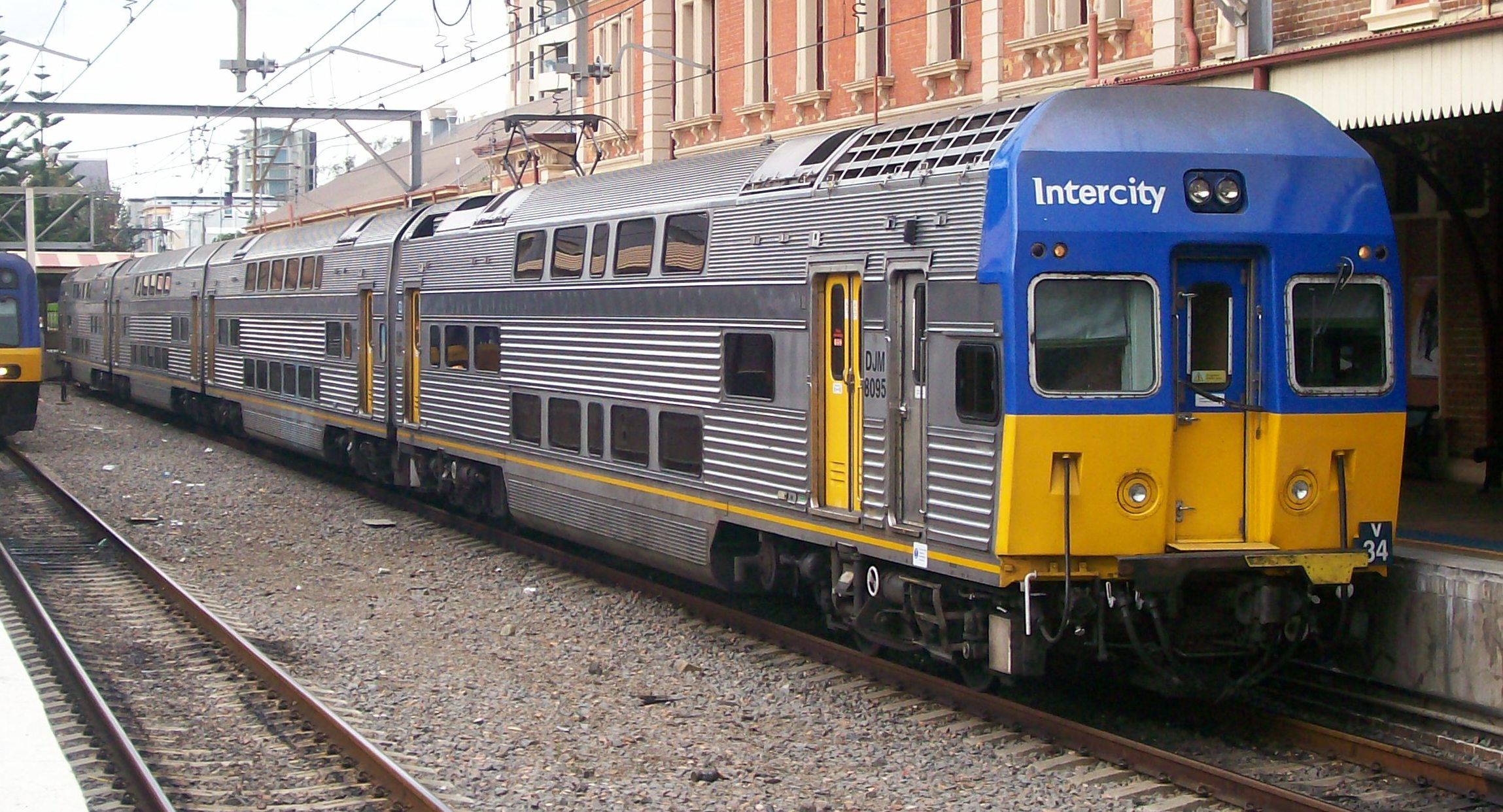
V34 with a DJM car in CityRail livery at Newcastle railway station, July 2013

From 1985, DJM power cars and DIT trailer cars entered service. Technological advances saw a thyristor chopper system fitted to the next batch of power cars, coded DJM. The chopper cars gave a smoother and quieter ride. The chopper cars can be distinguished from the earlier camshaft cars by a large open grille at the pantograph end of the power car, and by different hatch coverings over the driver's side of the power car. DJM 8123–8137 had even larger open grilles on the pantograph end. DJM 8101 had its Candy livery moulded fibreglass end repainted into CityRail blue and yellow in 1990 to form a special set, with the commemorative wording "celebrating 20 years of double-deck intercity services to Gosford" applied near the driver's cab window. In 2009, DJM 8101's front was repainted into standard Intercity livery.

=== Final batch (DKM and DKT) ===
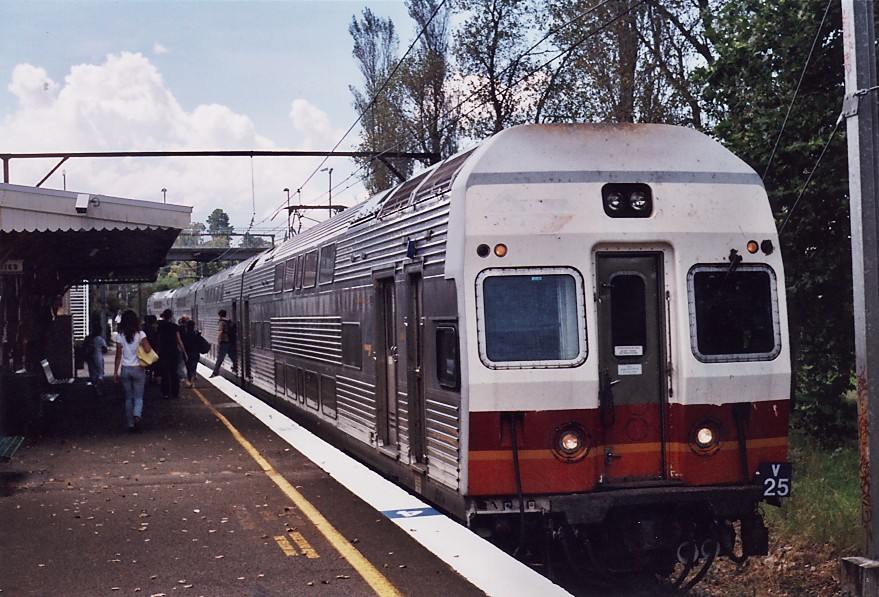
A DKM carriage with the State Rail Authority "Candy" livery. The DK carriages were fitted with a glass-reinforced plastic end in 1989.

The final V sets were introduced in 1989, and they were the last carriages to be built by Comeng's Granville factory.

These cars were coded DKM and DKT and are permanently coupled. There were several changes: the cars were finished in corrugated steel, instead of the previous inserted Budd fluting. Seating had separate seat backs. Instead of the push-pull doors inside the previous V sets, the DKs were fitted with an electronically operated vestibule door, and no doors were installed at the gangway between DKM and DKT cars. The State Rail Authority wanted to order an extra 50 but funding was not available.

The V set carriages are notably the largest electric carriages commissioned for the New South Wales railway network with a length of 23 metres and with the trailer cars weighing 40 tonnes, and the power cars weighing a further 61 tonnes at most.

== Car Prefix codes ==
The V set cars all start with a 3-letter prefix, these prefixes make up the car code naming system. This system loosely follows a few NSW conventions.

Code	Meaning	Explanation	Numbers	Induction Years	Years in Use
DCF	Double-deck Control 'Second Class'	C means Control (car contains motors and driver controls) under the suburban codes. Under the existing Passenger Rolling stock prefix system of the time, the letter F meant "Second Class" which has become synonymous with Economy.	8001–8008	1970	1970–82
DTF	Double-deck Trailer 'Second Class'	T means Trailer (car contains no motors or driver controls) under the suburban codes. Under the existing Passenger Rolling stock prefix system of the time, the letter F meant "Second Class" which has become synonymous with Economy.	9011–9012	1970	1970–82
DTC	Double-deck Tralier Combined	T means Trailer (car contains no motors or driver controls) under the suburban codes. Under the existing Passenger Rolling stock prefix system of the time, the letter C meant "Combined" which was used when a car contained two different classes. These cars when introduced had First Class seating on the upper deck.	9021–9022	1970	1970–82
DDC	Double-deck Driver Combined	The Second D means Driver-trailer (car contains no motors but has driver controls) under the suburban codes. Under the existing Passenger Rolling stock prefix system of the time, the letter C meant "Combined" which was used when a car contained two different classes. These cars when introduced had First Class seating on the upper deck.	9001–9004	1970	1970–82
DCM	Double-deck Control Motor	This code does not clearly follow any existing conventions.	8021–8036	1977–1978	1977–2026
DCT	Double-deck Control Trailer	This code does not clearly follow any existing conventions, using Control Trailer instead of the conventional "Driver Trailer"	9031–9044	1977–1978	1977–2026
DMT	Double-deck Ex-Motor Trailer	Modified DCF cars became DMT cars in 1982. Their cabs were removed and they were made into trailers.	9201–9207	1982	1982–2008
DDT	Double-deck Ex-Driver Trailer	Modified DDC cars became DDT cars in 1982. Their cabs were removed and they were made into trailers.	9208–9211	1982	1982–2005
DFT	Double-deck Ex-'second class' Trailer	Modified DTF and DTC cars became DFT cars in 1982. First class was abolished in 1974 meaning both types of cars were effectively second class at the time of conversion.	9212–9215	1982	1982–2005
DIM	Double-deck 'I' Motor	The use of M for Motor does not clearly follow any existing NSW conventions except for the earlier 1977 built cars. 'I' was used to refer to the generation of trains.	8020, 8037–8092	1981–1985, 1999	1981–2026
DIT	Double-deck 'I' Trailer	'I' was used to refer to the generation of trains.	9101–9184	1981–1985	1981–2026
DJM	Double-deck 'J' Motor	'J' was used to refer to the generation of trains. This was the first generation of V sets to use Chopper controls, thus the change in generation. These cars were built with DIT trailers.	8093–8138	1985	1985–2026
DKM	Double-deck 'K' Motor	'K' was used to refer to the generation of trains. This generation was semi-permanently coupled to DKT Trailer cars, thus the change in generation.	8138–8145	1989	1989–2026
DKT	Double-deck 'K' Trailer	'K' was used to refer to the generation of trains. This generation was semi-permanently coupled to DKM cars, thus the change in generation.	9184–9191	1989	1989–2026
DTM	Double-deck Two-car Motor	Created from modified DCM cars. They were refurbished and modified to run with DTD cars as part of 2 car trains, to operate "The River" service.	8033–8034, 8036 (at least)	~1995	~1995–2026
DTD	Double-deck Two-car Driver	Created from modified DCT cars. They were refurbished and modified to run with DTM cars as part of 2 car trains, to operate "The River" service.	9033, 9035–9036 (at least)	~1995	~1995–2026
DET	Double-deck Experimental Trailer	The Contura Conference car was called DET once it was returned to regular service as a Trailer car in 2000.	9216	2000	2000–2026

== Overhauls ==
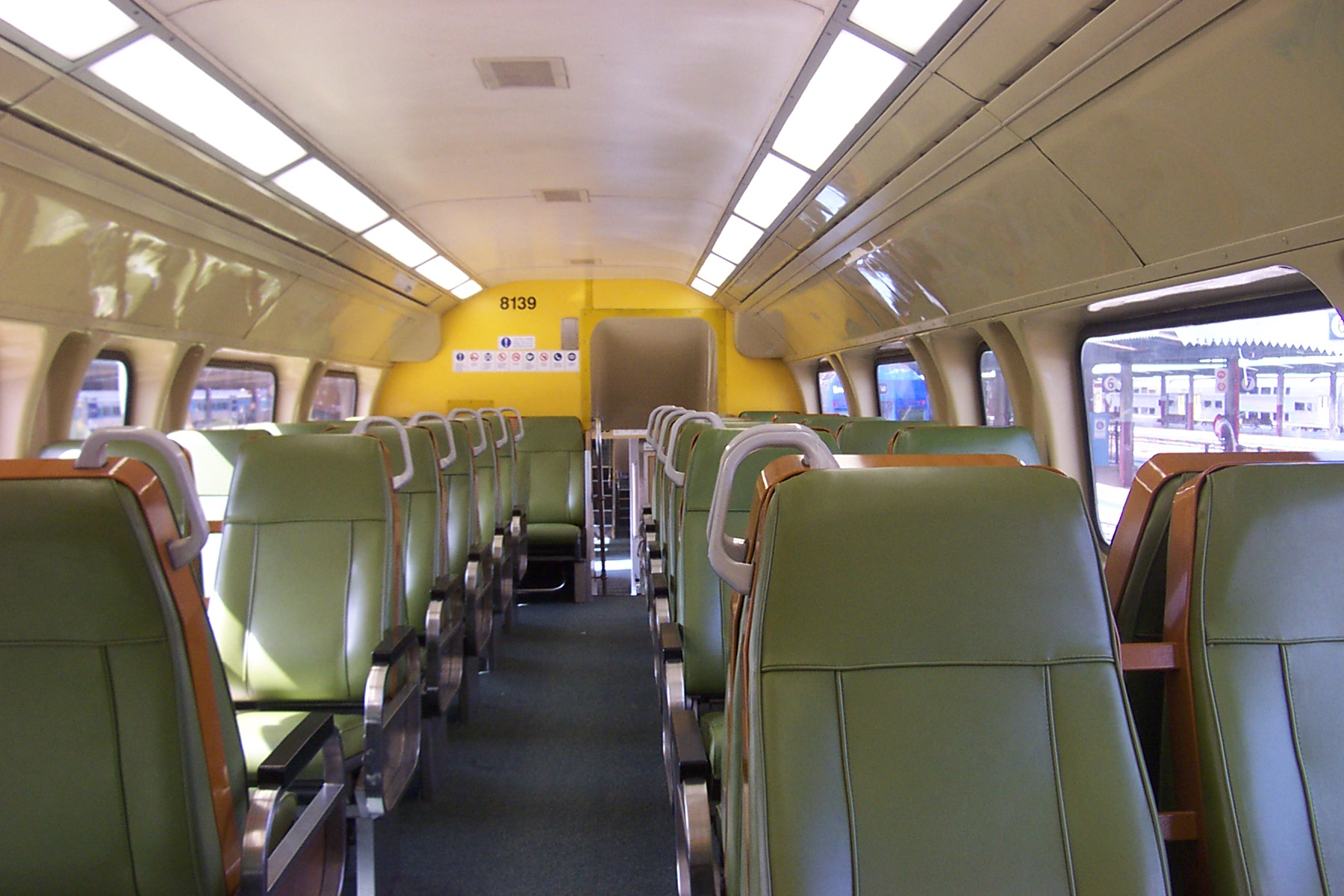
The upper deck of a DK series car prior to refurbishment, with old "Olive Green" upholstery

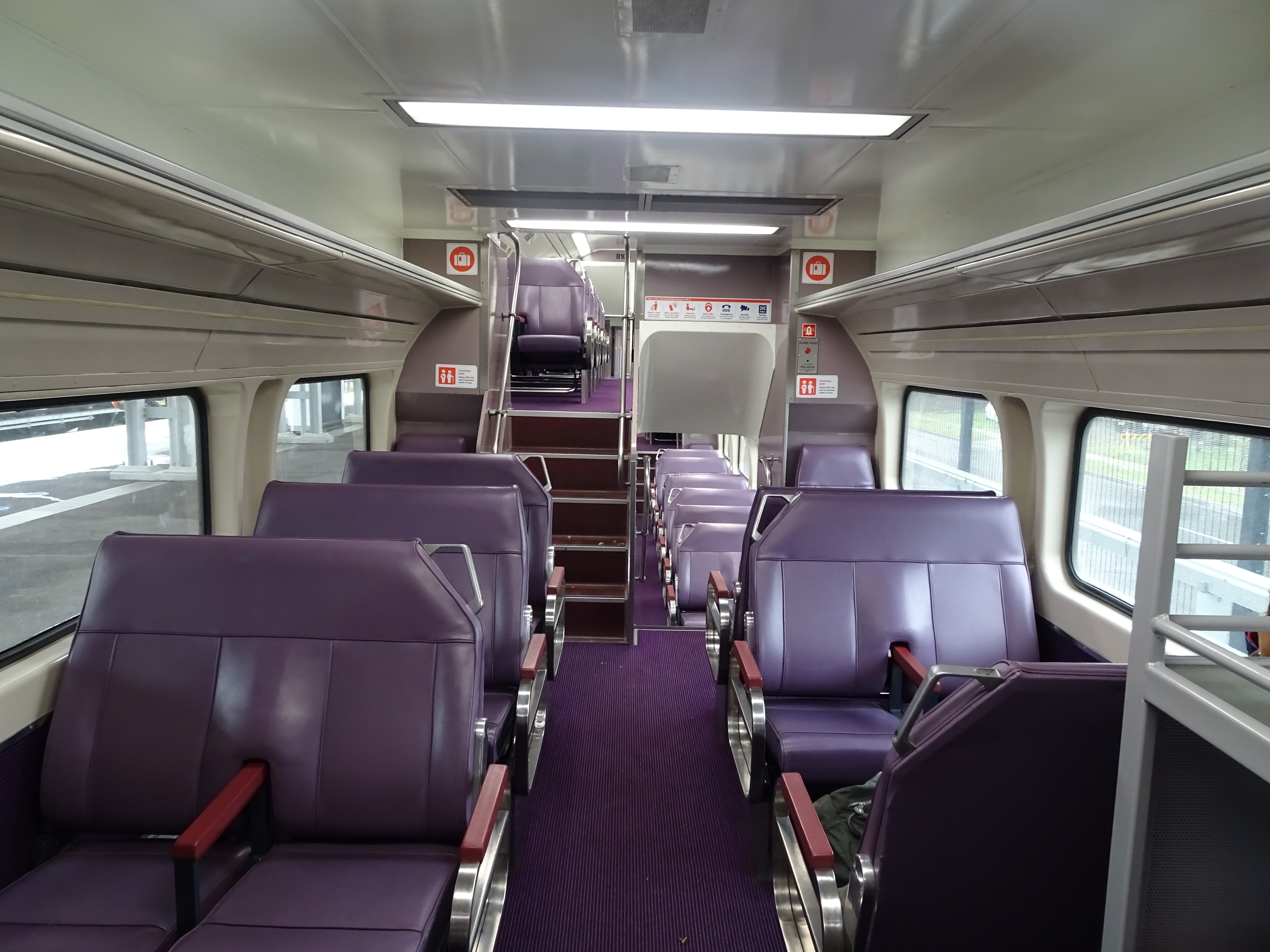
Refurbished vestibule with "Bush Plum" upholstery

In 1982 the remaining 15 original cars from 1970 (DCF8004 had been destroyed in an accident in 1974) were refurbished into trailer cars. This involved the fitting of two toilets into crew space of the DCF cars, which involved the removal of the crew doors and the crew windows, and the fitting of opaque windows in place of the crew doors. The original luggage racks on the single deck sections were also removed, and vestibule doors between the doorways and seating areas were added, as these did not exist in the original design.

During 1993, the distinctive gold tinted windows were replaced by charcoal ones. Starting in May 1995 the earlier carriages were overhauled by A Goninan & Co, Broadmeadow as part of the CityDecker program. This saw the DCMs receive driver's cab air conditioning, destination indicators and ditchlights where not already fitted. The fibreglass end was repainted grey and yellow. This was later changed to blue and yellow.

Some DCM cars and some DCT cars were also refurbished around the same time to form captive 2 car sets, used for 2 car trains between Saint Marys and Wyong as part of a special route called "The River". They were renamed DMT and DTD cars respectively as part of this refurbishment, and the DTM cars got wheelchair spaces fitted.

Eventually all cars were put through the program to change those with yellow interiors to have the same cream interior with green seats style as the older cars.

On 1 July 2013, a refurbishment of the remaining 200 cars was announced as part of the NSW TrainLink and Sydney Trains restructure and branding. The refurbishment most notably included new carpets and seat covers themed in 'Bush Plum'. The external livery of the trains are also changed to a grey, red and yellow scheme, featuring the NSW TrainLink logo. This livery was nicknamed the "Hamburger Livery" for its similar appearance to a burger. Many of the "M" cars were fitted with luggage racks and/or wheelchair seating, created by removing 1 seat module for luggage racks and 2 for the wheelchair spaces in the non-driver cab end of the cars closest to a newly widened vestibule door. The image to the right showing bush plum seating shows part of the luggage rack on the right (in place of a seating module) although this car does not have a wheelchair space – on cars with wheelchair spaces the seat module on the left closest to the camera would be removed, as well as the one out of view next to it. Versions of car existed refurbishment with either a wheelchair space and no luggage rack, luggage rack and no wheelchair space, or both or neither. DKM cars were not modified to add wheelchair spaces as it would have involved replacing their glass vestibule doors.

== In service ==
When introduced, the V sets operated interurban services from Sydney Central on the Main Northern line to Gosford and on the Main Western line to Mount Victoria. It was not until the Ten Tunnels west of Clarence were lowered in 1978 that they were able to operate to Lithgow.

Following the extension of the electrified network, their sphere of operation was extended to Wyong (April 1982), Newcastle (June 1984), Port Kembla (February 1986), Dapto (January 1993) and Kiama (November 2001). From January 2012, V sets ceased operating South Coast services. In June 2015, retired cars 8038–9031–9040–8040 were returned to service as V27.

From 27 June 2025, V sets ceased operations on the Central Coast & Newcastle Line with the rollout of the 10 car D sets.

As of 30 January 2026, V sets ceased operations on the Blue Mountains Line.

=== Higher speed trials ===
In May 1987, the State Rail Authority introduced a new timetable that required V sets to operate at the higher XPT speeds, up to 130 km/h. This practice was subsequently approved "on a continuing trial basis" in June 1990 as testing by State Rail Authority engineers proved it was satisfactory. This practice was later stopped.

=== ATP trials ===
Six cars from the third batch were converted into test trains to trial the Automatic train protection (ATP) system and the Digital Train Radio System (DTRS) across the electrified network in late 2015. DJMs 8121, 8127, 8128 and 8134 and DITs 9127 and 9131 were formed into two sets numbered Y1 and Y2.

=== Accidents ===
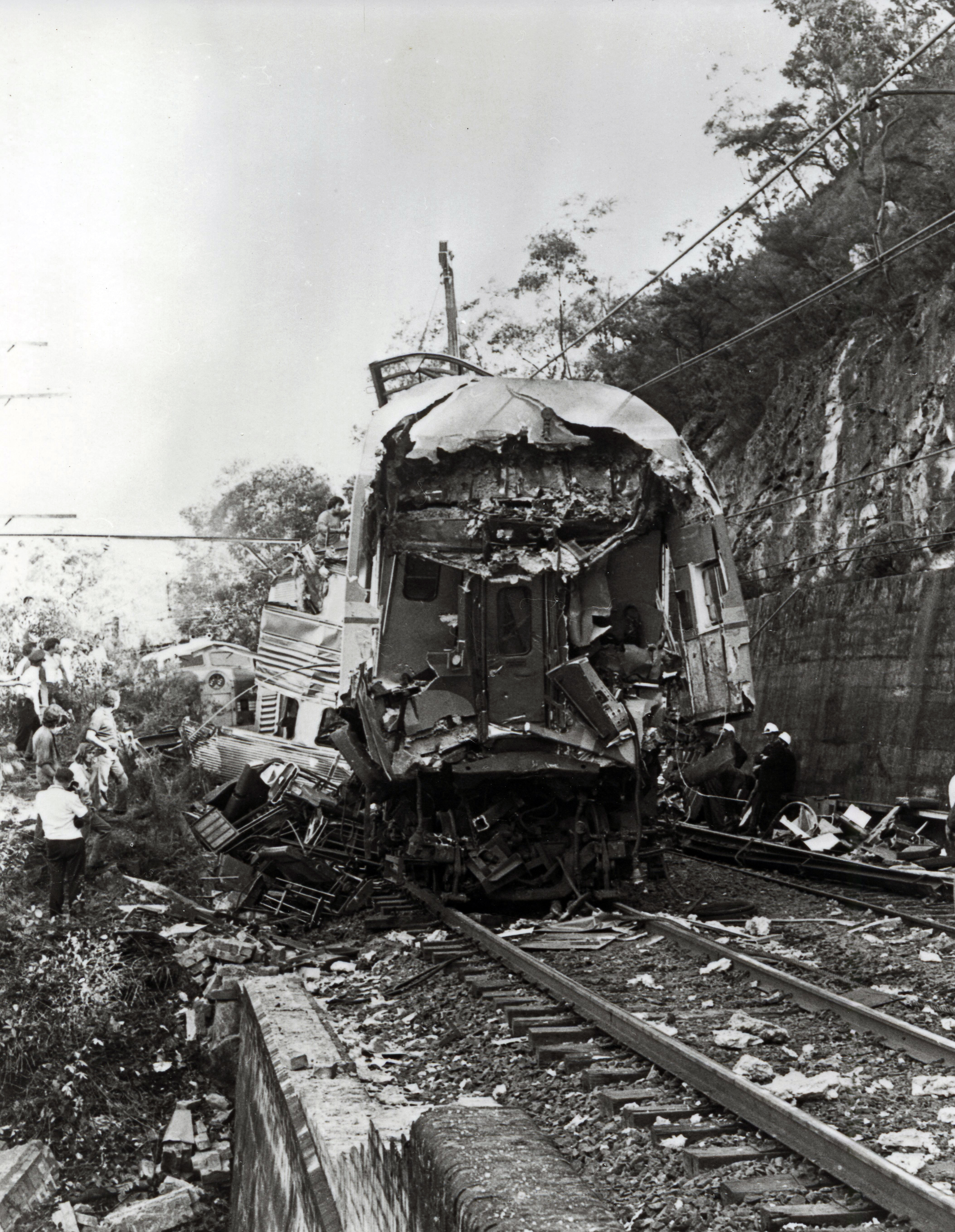
The aftermath of the 1976 Glenbrook collision

- DCF 8004 – late on 16 January 1976, a four-car set broke down at Glenbrook, when locomotive 4622 struck the rear car killing one passenger and injuring ten others in the 1976 Glenbrook rail accident. The damaged rear motor car was moved to the side of the track to clear the line, but it overbalanced and fell down a 400m deep gorge, breaking in half on the way down. The pieces were lifted out with RAAF helicopters.
- DCM 8030 was written off after an accident near Emu Plains in September 1985
- DIM 8048 was written off after an accident at Springwood in September 1987
- DJM 8107 was written off after an incident at Lawson in November 1989
- DIM 8037 was written off after an accident at Katoomba in January 1990
- DIM 8060 was written off after the Cowan rail accident in May 1990
- DIM 8067 on 2 December 1999 collided with the rear car carrier of the Indian Pacific in the Glenbrook train disaster rebuilt as DIM 8020
- DCM 8027 was rebuilt after an accident at Katoomba after a tree fell onto the roof in mid 2011
- DCM 8028 was written off after being crushed by falling trees at Medlow Bath in July 2011
- V40 and V48 collided with each other at Mount Victoria in July 2015. Two cars of V40 (DKM 8144, DKT 9190) and V48 (DJM 8113, DIT 9147) were withdrawn for repairs and subsequently returned to service, since mid-2017 the cars have been reverted to usual up until they were both retired in 2024.

== Withdrawal ==
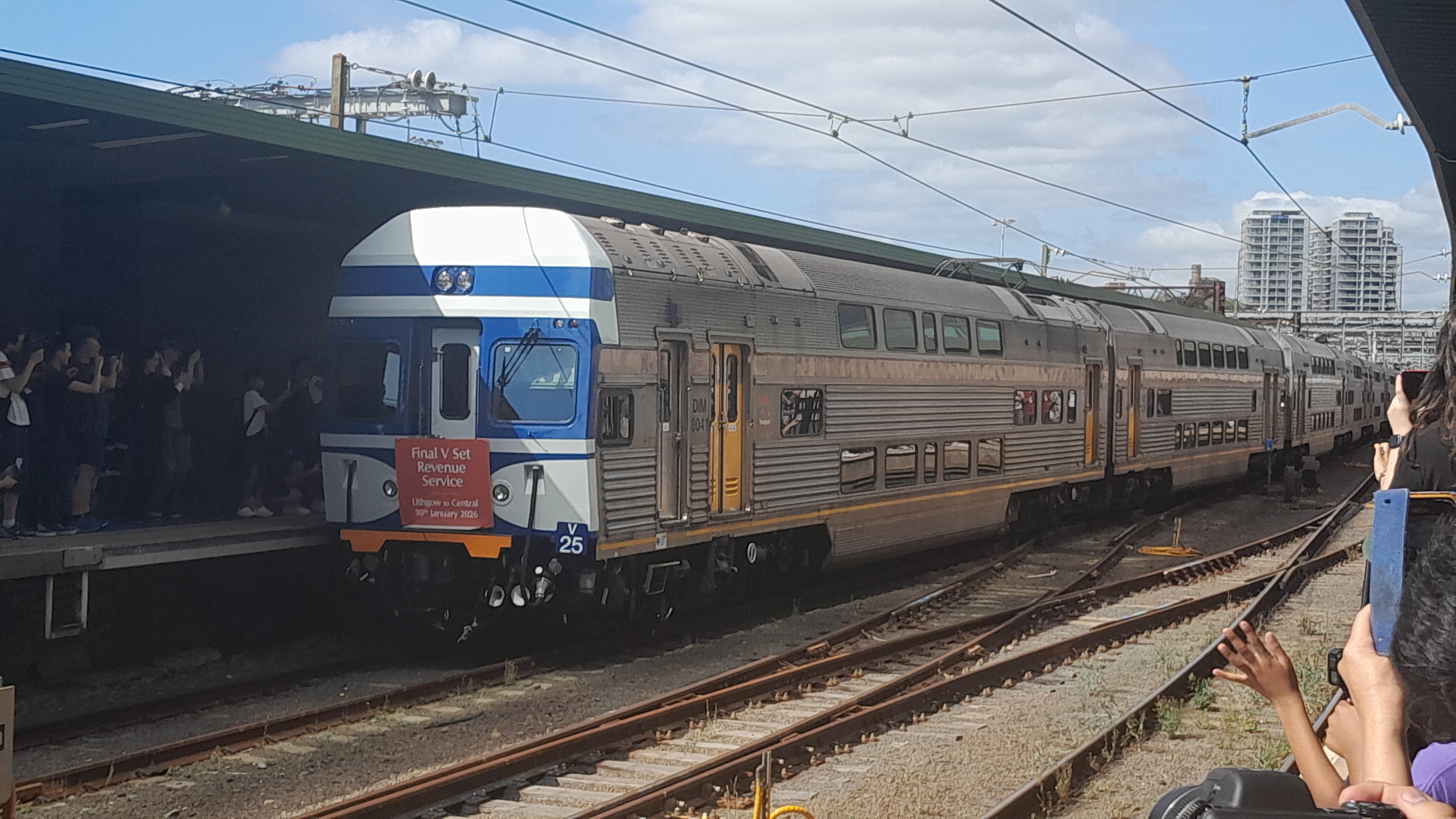
The final V set service consisting of sets V10 and V25. It left Sydney terminal at 10:00 am

The remaining 15 original series cars were withdrawn in late 2005, due to galvanic corrosion in their mild steel underframes as a result of contact with their stainless steel bodies. DMT 9204 was subsequently destroyed in an emergency services training exercise on 25 November 2008.

DIM 8020, formerly DIM 8067, was withdrawn in 2005 and was subsequently stored at Maintrain, Auburn. It was then used to test features such as door indicator lights, which were eventually rolled out to the rest of the V set fleet. In 2007, it was moved to the Petersham training college before being replaced in 2009 by two withdrawn S set cars. DIM 8020 was then transferred back to Auburn and remained stored until it was scrapped in 2021.

In June 2025, the first V set was scrapped, further carriages followed, being replaced by newer D sets.

In January 2026, the front ends of DIM 8041 and DIM 8044 on V10/25 were repainted in the original Blue Goose livery, however the anticlimber was painted orange instead of the original black. The sides of the carriages retained their final NSW TrainLink livery, however. The sets ran the final revenue V set service from Lithgow to Sydney Terminal (Central) on 30 January 2026.

On 12 February 2026, Sets V21 and V29 were transferred under their own power from Lithgow to Flemington while towing set V9. The former two sets are going in to storage while V9 was transferred to Chullora for scrapping. On the 22 June 2026, Sets V44, V45 and V46 travelled under their own power to Lithgow from FMC.

Following withdrawal on 22 May 2026, cars DIM8044, DIT9119, DET9216 and DIM8041 now known as set V10, nicknamed the "Blue Goose", performed a transfer from Lithgow to Flemington hauling sets V29 and V46 to clear Lithgow yard for track work.

=== Preservation ===
Transport Heritage NSW are planning on preserving an operational 4 car set, along with an additional car for static display. No specific carriages have been formally announced for preservation as of August 2026.

V10 and V25 ran the farewell run from Lithgow to Central, and following this, cars DIM8041 and DET9216 from V25 and DIM8044 and DIT9119 from V10 were marshalled into a four-car set and retargeted V10. DIM8041 and DIM8044 had had their front ends repainted into the original 1970 "Blue Goose" livery prior. The set has since been stored, with some empty transfer runs taking place.

== Liveries ==
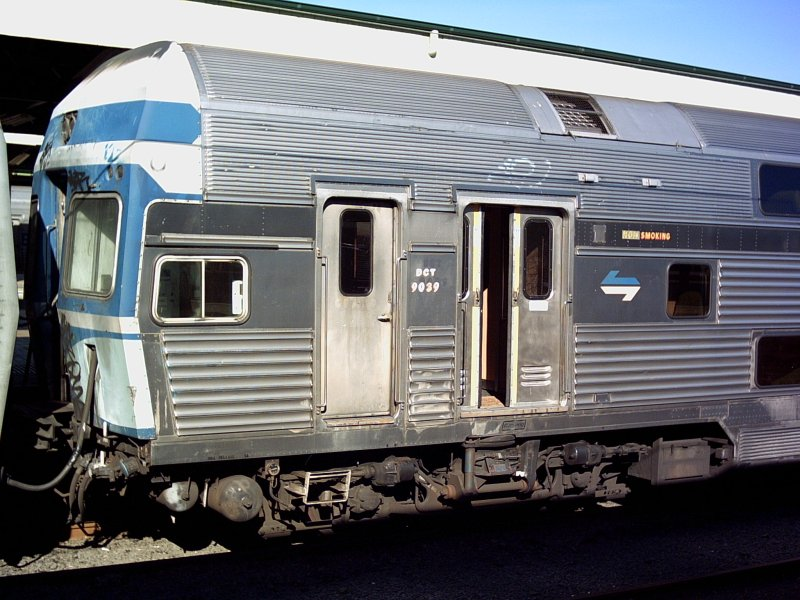
PTC Blue Goose Livery; 1970–1981

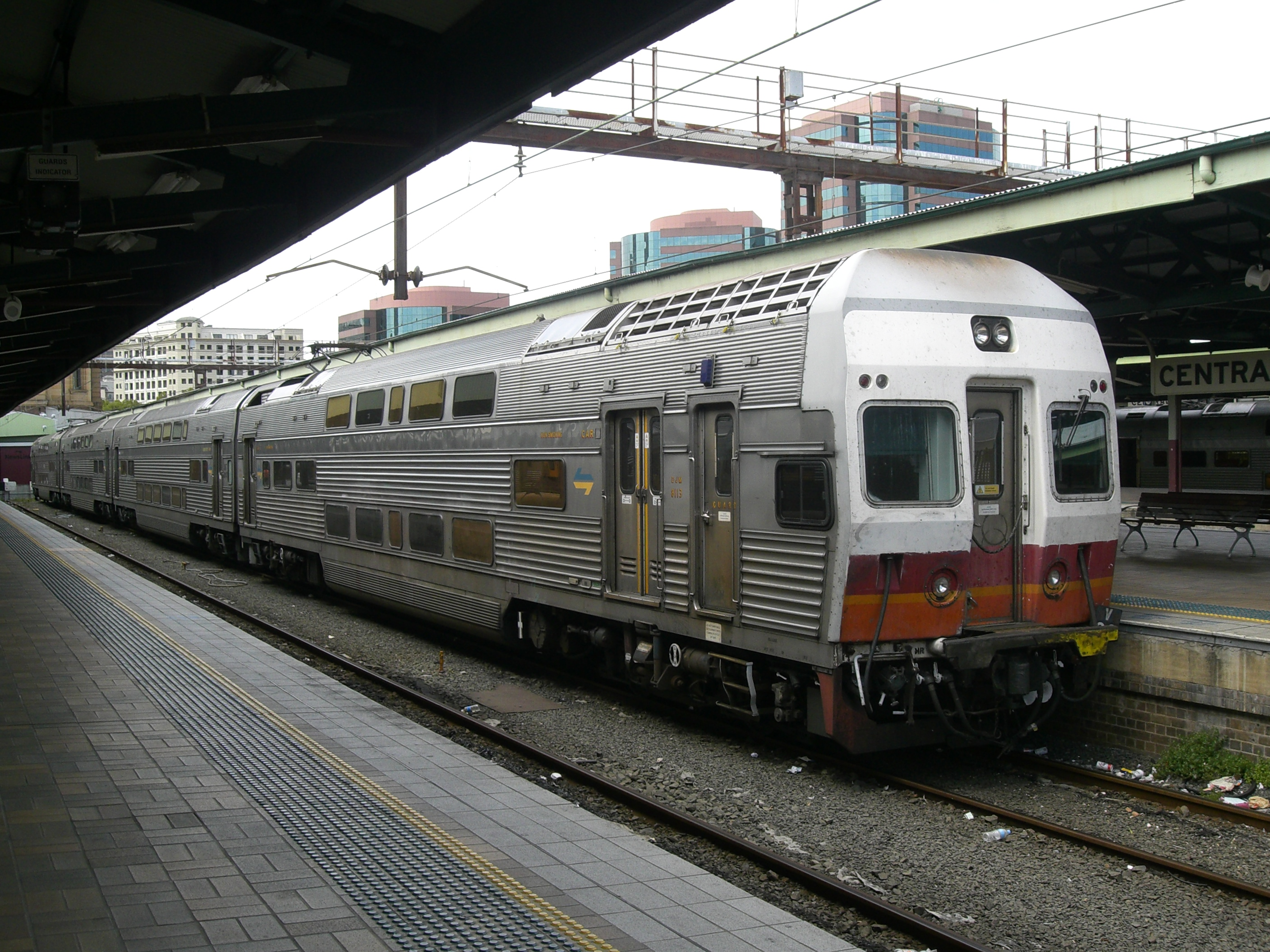
State Rail Authority "Candy" Livery; 1981–1995

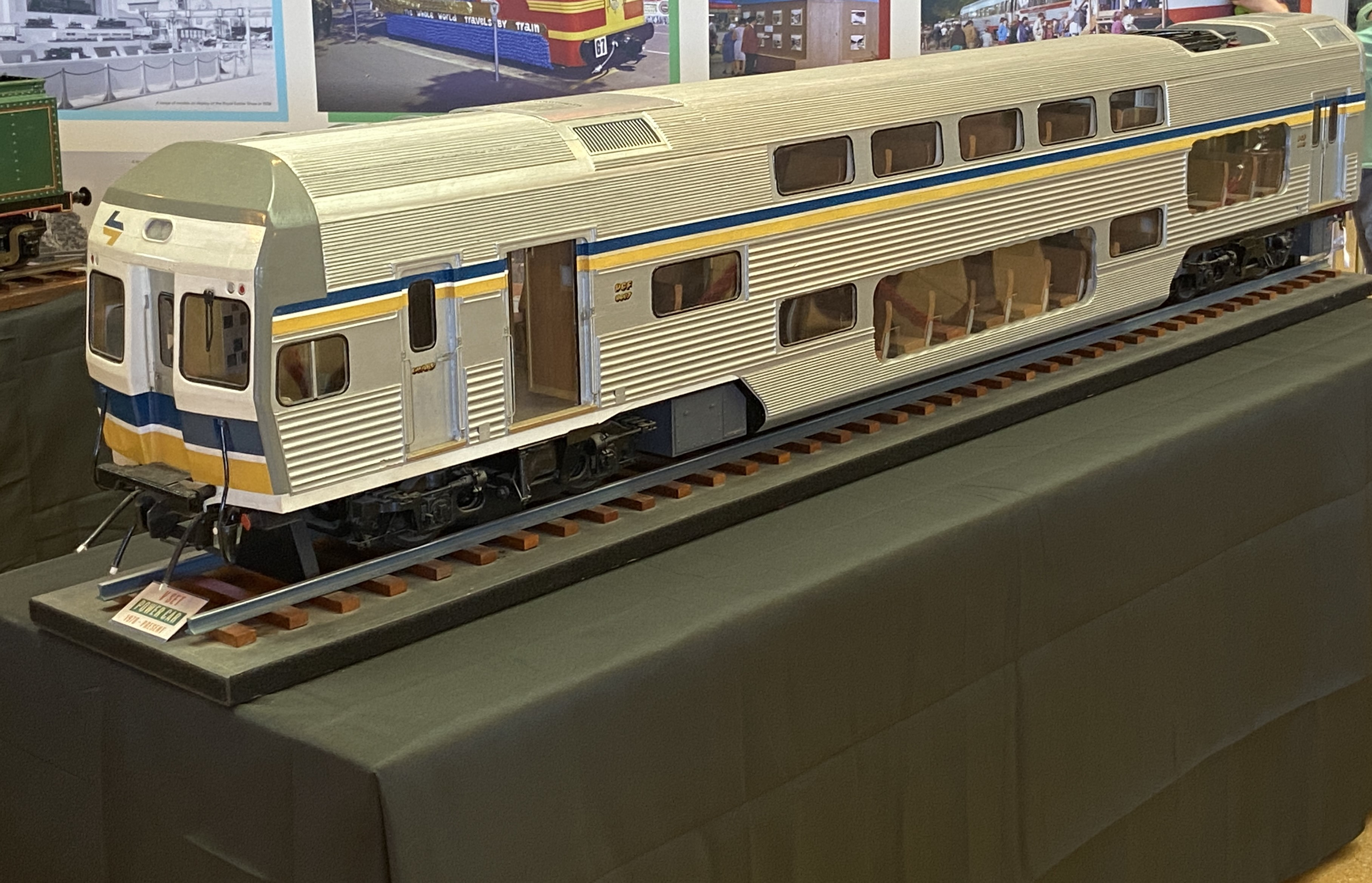
CityRail Livery; 1995–2001

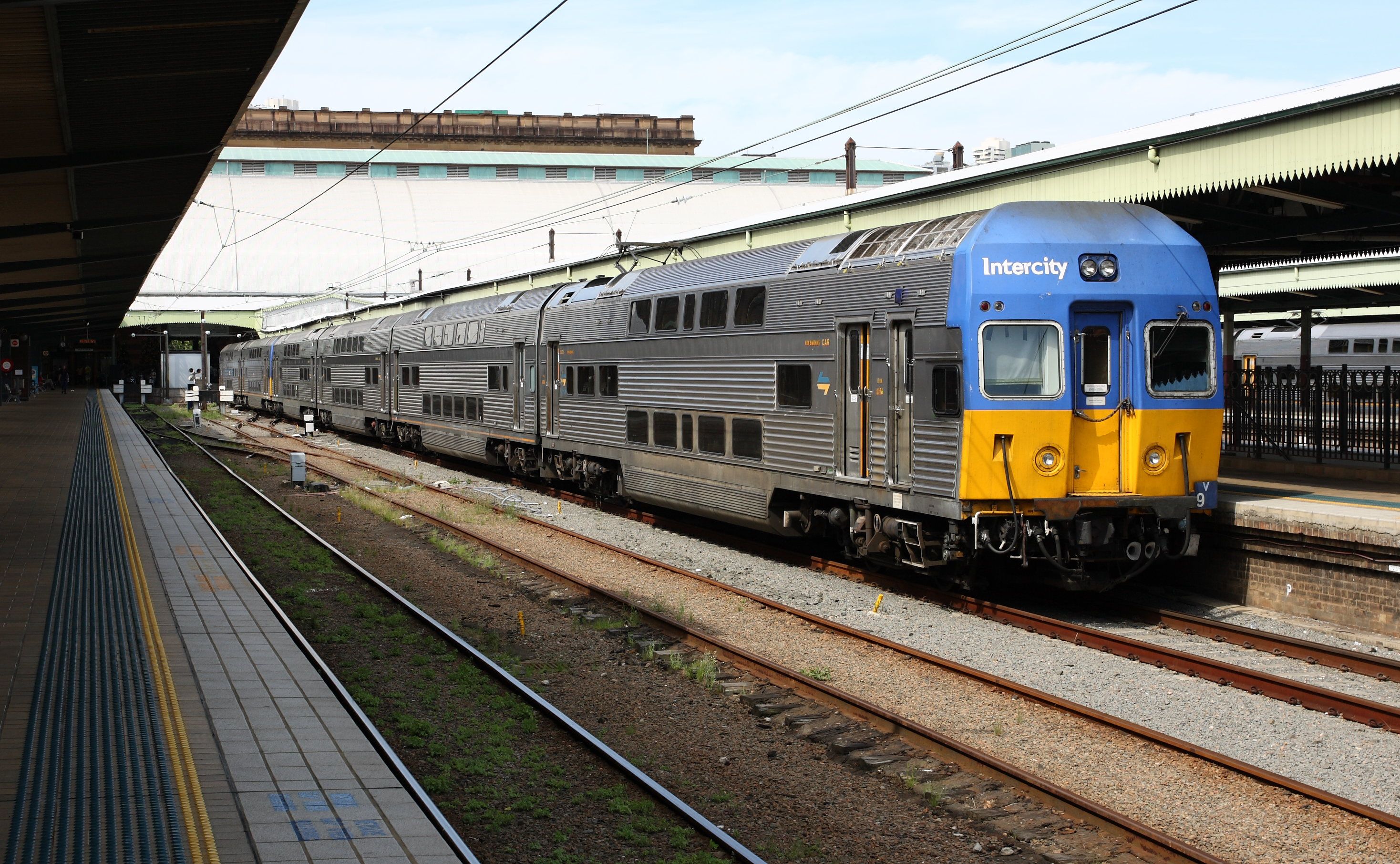
CityRail "Intercity" Livery; 2001–2013

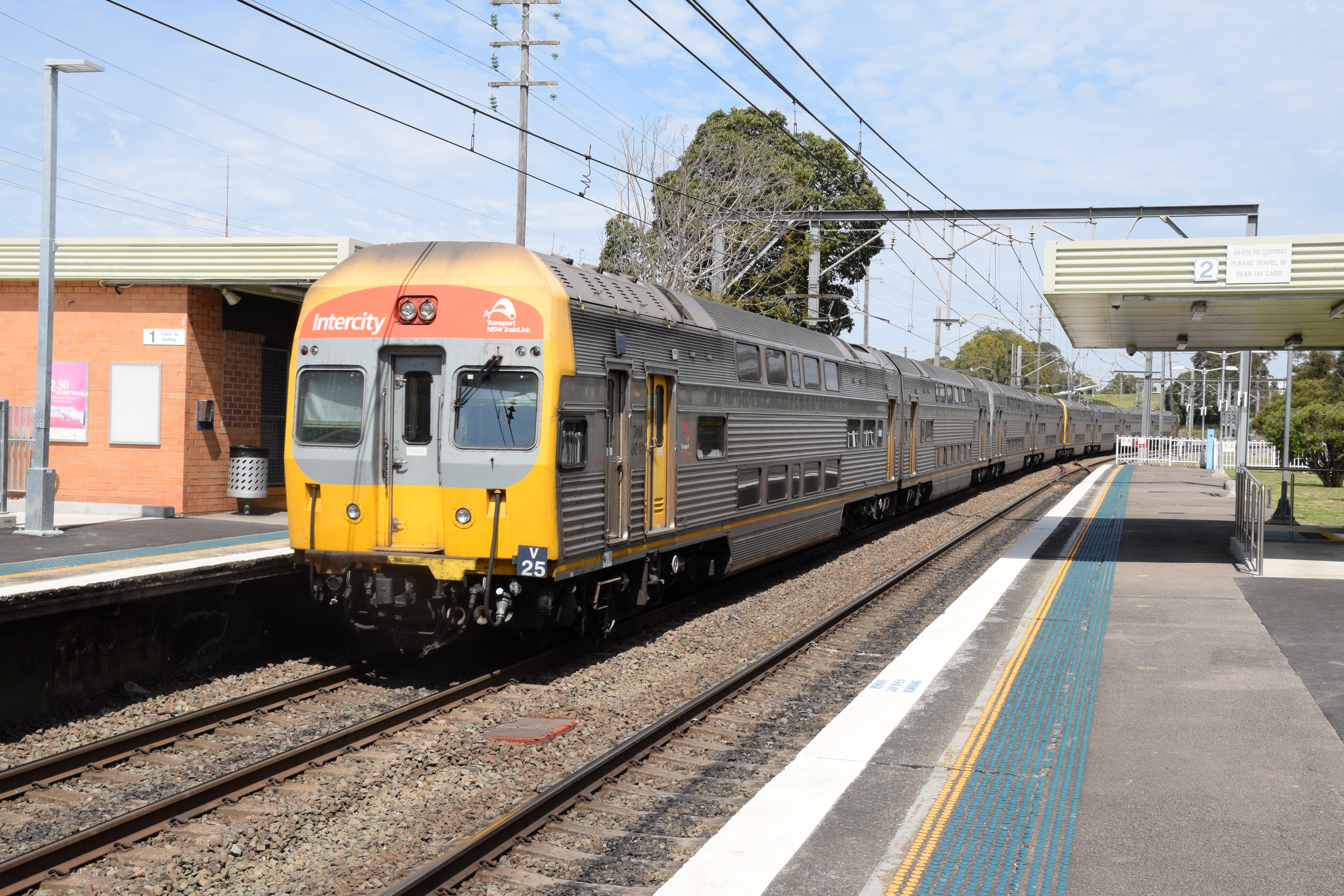
NSW TrainLink "Hamburger" Livery; 2013–2024

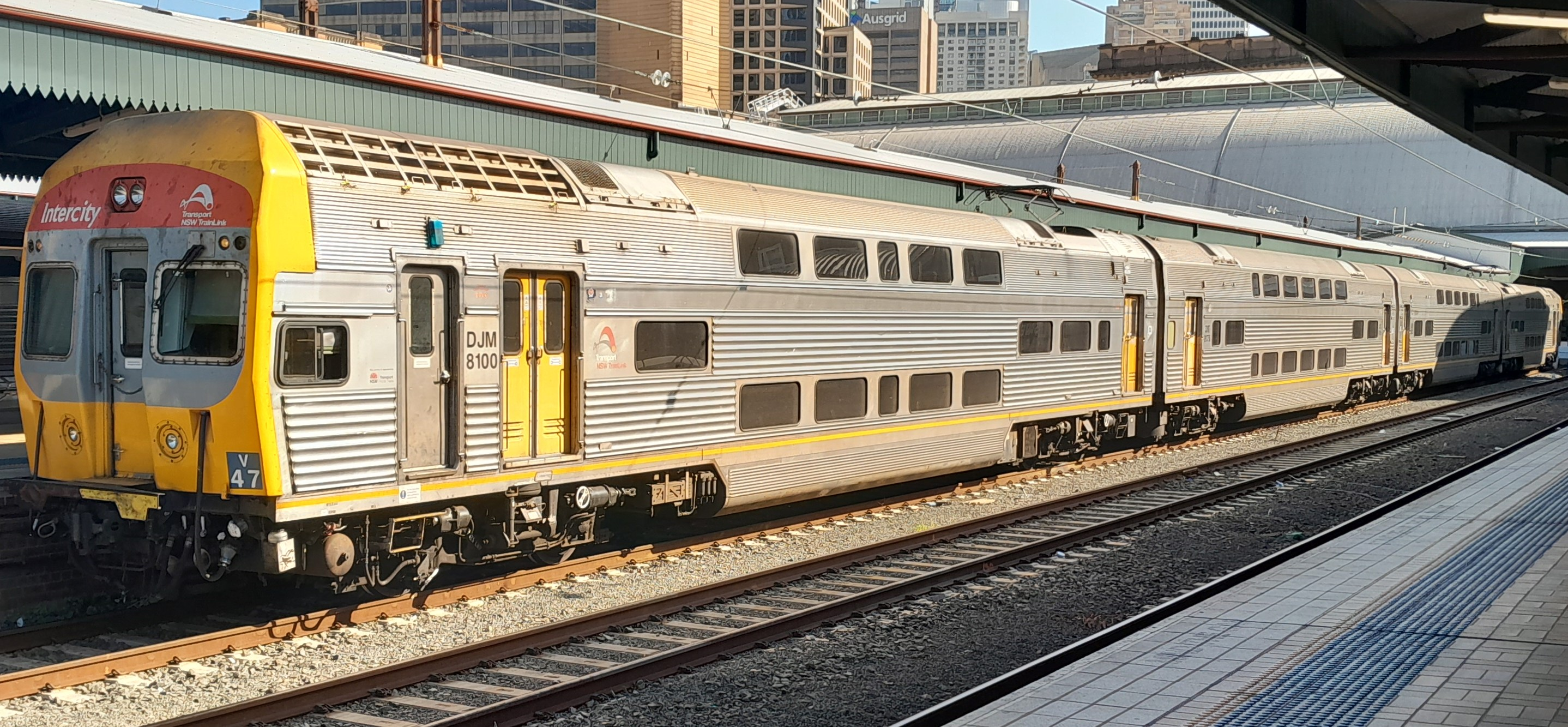
Sydney Trains "Hamburger" Livery; 2024–2026

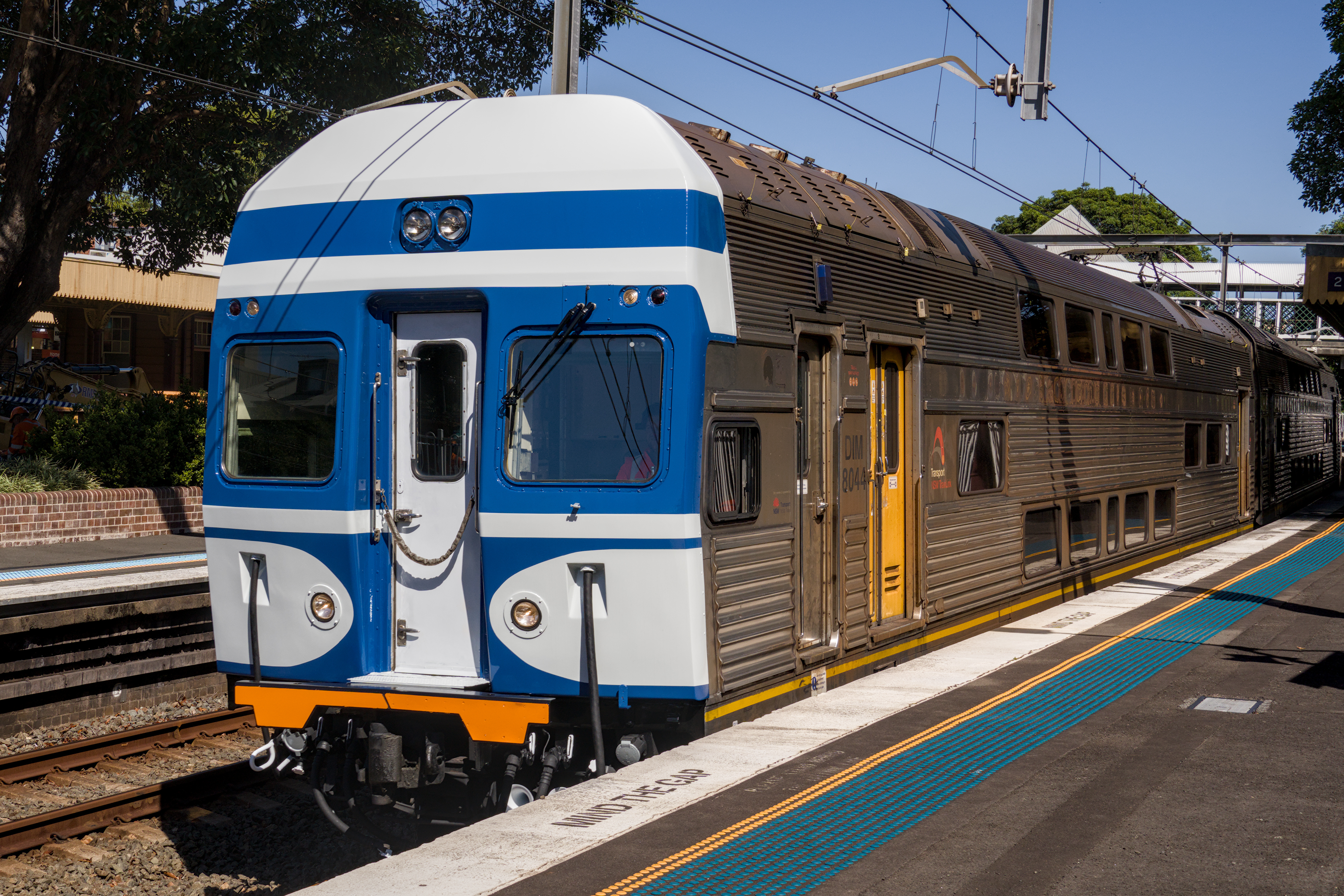
PTC Blue Goose Livery; 2026
