= Glenbrook =

Glenbrook may refer to:

== Locations ==
=== Australia ===
- Glenbrook, New South Wales

=== Canada ===
- Glenbrook, Calgary, a neighbourhood in Alberta

=== Ireland ===
- Glenbrook, County Cork, a small area in County Cork on the southeast tip of Ireland

=== New Zealand ===
- Glenbrook, New Zealand

=== United States ===
- Glenbrook, California
  - Glenbrook, Lake County, California
  - Glenbrook, Nevada County, California
- Glenbrook (Stamford), a section of Stamford, Connecticut
- Glenbrook, Nevada, the oldest settlement on Lake Tahoe
- Glenbrook, Oregon

== Transportation ==
- Glenbrook station (Metro-North), in Glenbrook, Connecticut, United States
- Glenbrook railway station (Ireland), a former station in Cork, Ireland
- Glenbrook railway station, New South Wales, in Glenbrook, New South Wales, Australia
- The Glenbrook, an American narrow-gauge steam railway locomotive

== See also ==
- Glenbrook High School (disambiguation), of several schools
- Glenbrook Square, a super-regional mall in Fort Wayne, Indiana
- Glenbrook Partners, a payments consulting firm in the United States
