= Glenbrook, California =

Glenbrook, California may refer to:

- Glenbrook, Lake County, California
- Glenbrook, Nevada County, California
