= Blue Labyrinth =

Blue Labyrinth may refer to:

- Blue Labyrinth (New South Wales), a protected area in Australia
- Blue Labyrinth (novel)
