= Blue Labyrinth (New South Wales) =

Protected area in New South Wales, Australia

- Location within New South Wales

Highest point
- Coordinates: 33°49′S 150°30′E

Geography
- Parent range: Blue Mountains Range

The Blue Labyrinth is an area covering much of the southern part of Blue Mountains National Park in New South Wales, Australia. It spans an area south of the Great Western Highway from Wentworth Falls to Glenbrook, stretching from Kings Tableland in the west to Warragamba Dam and the Nepean River in the east, and the Burragorang Valley to the south.

== Geographical features ==
Below are some geographical features of the Blue Labyrinth.

Creeks and rivers:

- Glenbrook Creek
- Erskine Creek
- Warragamba River

Caves and rocks:

- Red Hands Cave
- Attic Cave
- Pisgah Rock

Tracks:

- Oaks Fire Trail
- Andersons Fire Trail
- Murphys Fire Trail
- Ingar Fire Trail
- St. Helena Ridge Trail
- Kings Tableland Road

== Rock art sites ==
The Blue Labyrinth contains many prehistoric Aboriginal rock art sites, many of which are charcoal engravings in rock shelters that depict animals such as swamp wallabies, eastern long-necked turtles, bush rats, and other animals. The best-known Aboriginal rock art site in the Blue Labyrinth is Red Hands Cave.

== See also ==
- List of Blue Mountains subjects
