= Glenbrook Lagoon =

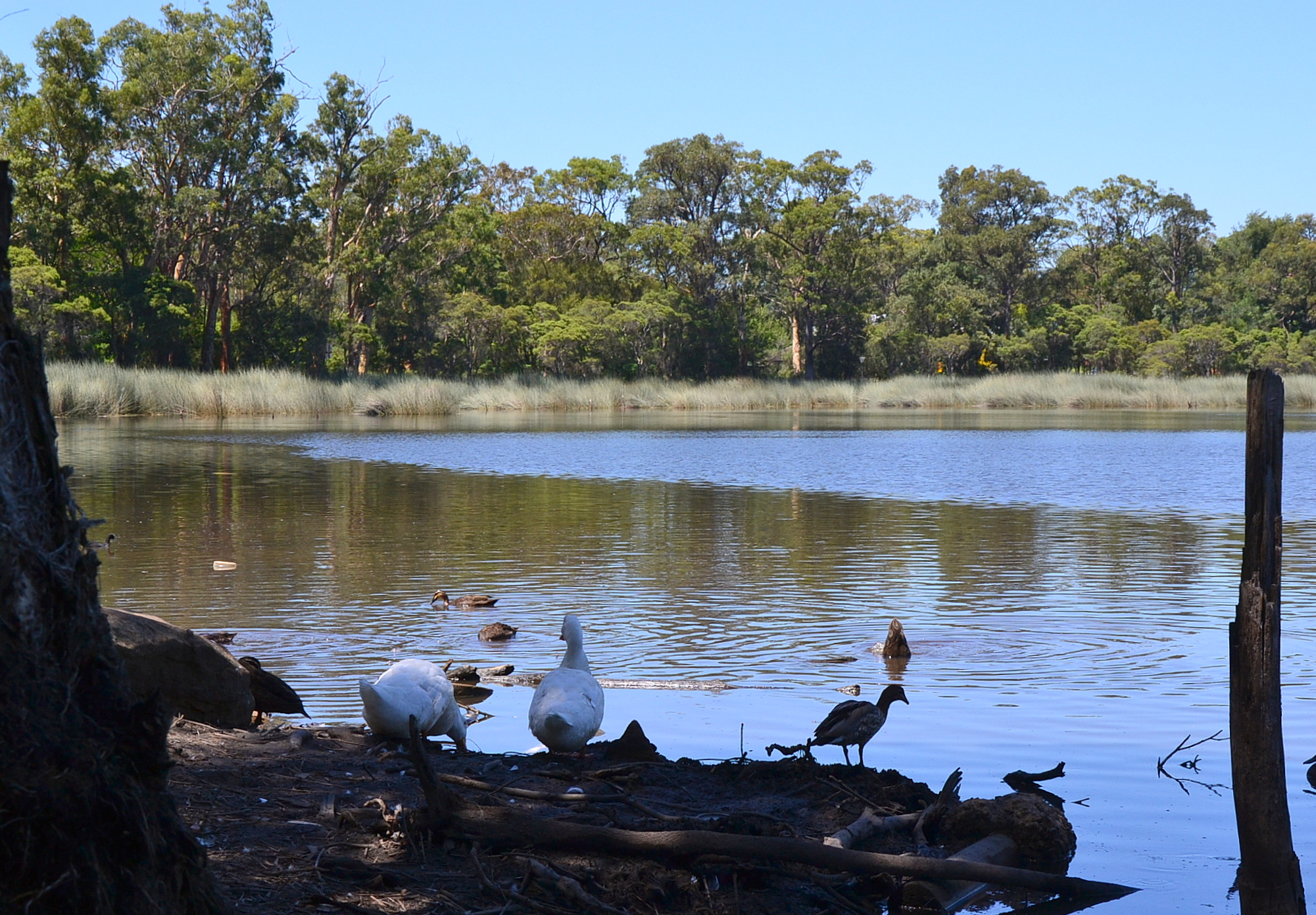
- Glenbrook Lagoon

- Location within New South Wales
- Coordinates: 33°45′27″S 150°36′59″E
- Type: reservoir
- Primary outflows: Brookside Creek
- Built: 1867
- Surface area: 7 ha (17 acres)

Glenbrook Lagoon is a fresh water lagoon located in Glenbrook, New South Wales, Australia, at the foot of the Blue Mountains. It is heritage-listed.

== Description ==
Glenbrook Lagoon is a heritage-listed site located in the suburb of Glenbrook in the Blue Mountains 10 kilometres west of Penrith and 3.8 km from Nepean river. The lagoon is a natural flat-bottom freshwater lagoon with an average depth of 2.7 metres and a maximum depth of 4.05 metres. The lagoon covers an area of 7 hectares. It relies on waterflow from the surrounding area. The lagoon is also fed by natural springs. Glenbrook Lagoon is one of only three lagoons of this kind in the Hawkesbury area water catchment. The lagoon and its surrounding area provide an important natural sanctuary for native flora and fauna. Currently the lagoon is used as a nature reserve and tourist attraction. Glenbrook Lagoon is of great cultural and historical significance to the people of the Blue Mountains.

== History ==
Bordered by residential areas on four sides, Glenbrook Lagoon serves as a reminder of the area's historic bush past. Best known for being found by William Lawson, William Wentworth and Gregory Blaxland on their crossing of the Blue Mountains in 1813; Blaxland, In his journal, described the way he "fell into a large lagoon of good water of very coarse rushes". In 1814 the lagoon and its surrounding areas were used as a camp by a group of convicts led by Cox as they built the first road over the Blue Mountains. At the instruction of Governor Macquarie the camp was later used as a military depot at the start of the mountains checking travellers permits to travel over the Blue Mountains. After a depot at Springwood was opened the depot at Glenbrook lagoon was no longer of use, however the lagoon was still used as an essential and welcomed source of water for those who travelled over the mountains by horse. The waterhole was later used to cool the engines of the early trains. The lagoon is now home to several wetland birds.

In 2006, the Blue Mountains City Council commenced a lagoon restoration project, removing weed infestations.

== Ellis family cottage ==
The Ellis family lived in the area in the 1940s, running an orchard and garden, in spite of the poor-quality soil. The land was clear at the time, but has now returned to nature after work carried out by the Glenbrook Lagoon Society Bushcare group, Blue Mountains City Council and the Urban Runoff Control Program. The remains of the Ellis family cottage are located a hundred metres north of the lagoon.

== Uses ==
The lagoon was first used as a military depot. The depot was used to check the permits of travellers who were planning on traveling over the Blue mountains. The lagoon was then used throughout 1867 to 1913 as an essential part of the Zig Zag Railway system, which took passengers through the Blue Mountains. Pipes took lagoon water to Glenbrook railway station providing the railway system with an important source of water. As a result, the eastern side of the lagoon was dammed to make the lagoon bigger and a larger source of water for the railway. The dam wall is currently used a road that allows residents to pass the lagoon. This road is currently known as Glenbrook Road but was previously named Railway Street.

In the 1860s the lagoon was also used as a dam to provide drinking water for the people living in the small town of Glenbrook.

The lagoon is currently used as a historical tourist attraction and bush walking site. The lagoon and its surrounding area also provide an important natural sanctuary for native flora and fauna. Glenbrook Lagoon also plays an important role in fighting bushfires. Helicopters use large buckets to collect the lagoon water and dump it over out of control bushfires. The lagoon water has been used in this way for several bush fires in 2001, 2013 and 2017.

== Significance ==
Due to its rich historical value the lagoon is holds great cultural significance to the local area. The lagoon was also previously used as a place to swim and fish by the local people. Therefore, it holds many fond memories for the people of Glenbrook. Due to the role in which the lagoon has played throughout the history of the Blue Mountains, especially in regards to its uses with the Zig Zag Railway it has been deemed that Glenbrook Lagoon carries a great historical significance for the people of the Blue mountains. The lagoon also hosts a range of native species of flora and fauna. The lagoon's surrounding area features large Euclaypt and Angophora costa (Eucalyptus piperita) trees, which are unique to the location of the lagoon. These trees provide a suitable habitat for the Peron's tree frog (L. peronii). The dense rushes such as grey rush (Lepironia articulata), spike rush (Eleocharis sphacelata) as well as fallen logs surrounding the edges of the lagoon, make good foraging habitat for native wetland birds such as the swamp hen (Genus porphyria). These native plants also provide some protection from predators allowing for possible breeding spots. The rushes also provide habitats for frogs including the striped marsh frog (Limnodynastes peroni) and the eastern dwarf tree frog (Vitoria fallax). The lagoon's surface is also populated with native bladderwort (Utricularia australias). The bladderwort also provides foraging habitat on the lagoon's surface. It is these native species which the surrounding area of the lagoon and its surrounding areas play host to that give the area its aesthetic significance.

== Pollution ==
The damming of the eastern side of the lagoon for the Zig Zag Railway has caused issues for the lagoon, mainly because it caused the lagoon to become a closed water system and any pollutants are unable to be flushed out of the lagoon naturally. In turn this has led to a significant build-up of pollutants carried by storm water into the lagoon. Without proper drainage of this water, significant environmental issues have risen, including the growth of noxious weeds which have effectively choked out natural aquatic flora and fauna living in the lagoon. The urbanisation of the area surrounding the lagoon has also contributed to the pollution of the lagoon. The land which naturally drains to the lagoon is now built over with houses and shops; this causes polluted storm water to run straight into the lagoon. The polluted water can contain many chemicals and organic matter which are dangerous and may compromise the survival of the lagoon. These materials can include herbicides, fertilisers, grey water use, oil and petrol, sediment, sewage, animal faeces, garden waste, litter and contaminants. Without proper drainage surrounding the lagoon the runoff of this polluted water into the lagoon encourages the growth of noxious weeds. The growth of these noxious weeds can also be attributed to the dumping of domestic aquarium plants in the lagoon. The two noxious weeds which are of concern to the health of the lagoon are the cabomba weed (Cabomba caroliniana) and salvina weed (Salvinia molesta). Both of which have caused a variety of significant problems for the survival of the lagoon and its ecosystem. Cabomba has been listed as a class 5 noxious weed and also as a weed of significance and had been notably difficult to remove in past situations. Both of the noxious weeds cause severe oxygen depletion in the lagoon as they die and decompose using most of the dissolved oxygen available in the lagoon. This makes survival difficult for other aquatic organisms including native water plants, native fish and turtles.

== Treatment of cabomba and salvina weeds ==
The presence of the cabomba and salvina weeds in the lagoon posed a serious threat to native flora and fauna and also introduced the threat of the noxious weeds spreading into nearby waterways such as the Nepean River, Hawkesbury River and the many waterways within Blue Mountains National Park, including catchments which lead to Warragamba Dam. The dam is a major waterway which provides much of Western Sydney's drinking water. To combat this threat during 2006 a $95 000 grant was given to the Blue Mountains City Council to commence work on re-generating the lagoon and removing the salvina. Regeneration efforts involved the mechanical harvesting of 200 tonnes of salvina and also the use of herbicide spot treatment with some hand removal of the remaining weeds. However up until 2012, 100 percent of the lagoon's water column was still filled with cabomba. In 2012 the Blue Mountains City Council was given another grant to remove the cabomba weed. Removal of the cabomba weed in December 2012 included the use of the herbicide carfentrazone-ethyl, which was intended only to kill off 50% of the cabomba weed growth in the lagoon. However the herbicide killed off the cabomba entirely from the water body. The removal was considered a success, however during this treatment some native fish mortalities occurred due to oxygen depletion levels. These declining oxygen levels were attributed to the large amounts of breakdown of the dead cabomba weed matter caused by the use of the herbicide. To combat these declining dissolved oxygen levels, generators and pumps were brought to the lagoon attempt to re-oxygenate the water. However these efforts produced limited results, the task of re-oxygenating the lagoon proving to difficult with the little power supply to run the generators and pumps, and noise complaints from local residents. A water quality monitoring program was also set up at the time these attempts to kill off the weed were implemented. The hopes of this program were that it would be able to successfully monitor water quality, biodiversity and weed control outcomes of the lagoon. This was the first removal of the cabomba weed on a large scale area in New South Wales using carfentrazone-ethyl. Bush-care groups continue regeneration work on the lagoon and its surrounding areas in hopes of restoring the natural environment to provide habitats for the native fauna and flora. These bush-care groups also encourage the use of native aquarium plants instead of exotic and noxious ones such as cabomba, as it is believed that the dumping of these noxious weeds caused there significant growth and presence within the lagoon.

== Current state ==
Regeneration efforts at Glenbrook Lagoon have resulted in a 99% decrease of the noxious weed salvina. A 2014 weed monitoring survey found there to be no trace of the cabomba weed in Glenbrook Lagoon. However, in January 2107 there was found to be some regrowth of the weed. Due to the dispersed nature of the regrowth of cabomba, a large scale herbicide treatment would not have been effective. In efforts to quickly remove the weed and stop its presence reaching high levels, scuba divers were sent into the lagoon to remove the regrowth of the weed in areas which were deeper than one metre, ensuring that the root and crown of the plant was removed. The weed was again removed by hand and wading in shallower areas. Regeneration efforts have also seen an increase in turtle and fish numbers in recent years, with many native species once again becoming self-sustaining. Recent surveys by Biosis have determined a rise in species such as the freshwater catfish Tandanus tandanus, Australian smelt (Retropinna semoni), flat-headed gudgeon (Philypnodon grandiceps) and long-finned eel (Anguilla reinhardtii). The Blue Mountains council has worked with local bush care groups to augment habitats to form a natural environment that promotes the self-sustaining nature of native fish and deters the survival of some noxious fish which were reported by Biosis to be inhabiting the lagoon. There has also been increases in numbers of two species of turtles. The eastern long-necked turtle (Chelodina longicollis) and Sydney basin turtles (Emydura macquarii). A conscious effort is being made by these local bush regeneration groups to ensure the continued breeding success. There has also been a continuous rise in numbers of aquatic insects that are sensitive to pollution. These increases in aquatic species can be attributed to the removal of noxious weeds and upgrades to storm water treatment around the lagoon. However, to maintain the low levels of pollution and occurrence of noxious weeds a secondary Cabomba Weed Control Program has been implemented. The weed control program plans to continuously remove any regrowth of noxious weeds from the lagoon. The program also plans to regularly monitor the water pollution levels in the lagoon. It is hoped that through these efforts the lagoon will remain as a healthy ecosystem and will continue to be a sustainable habitat for native flora and fauna.

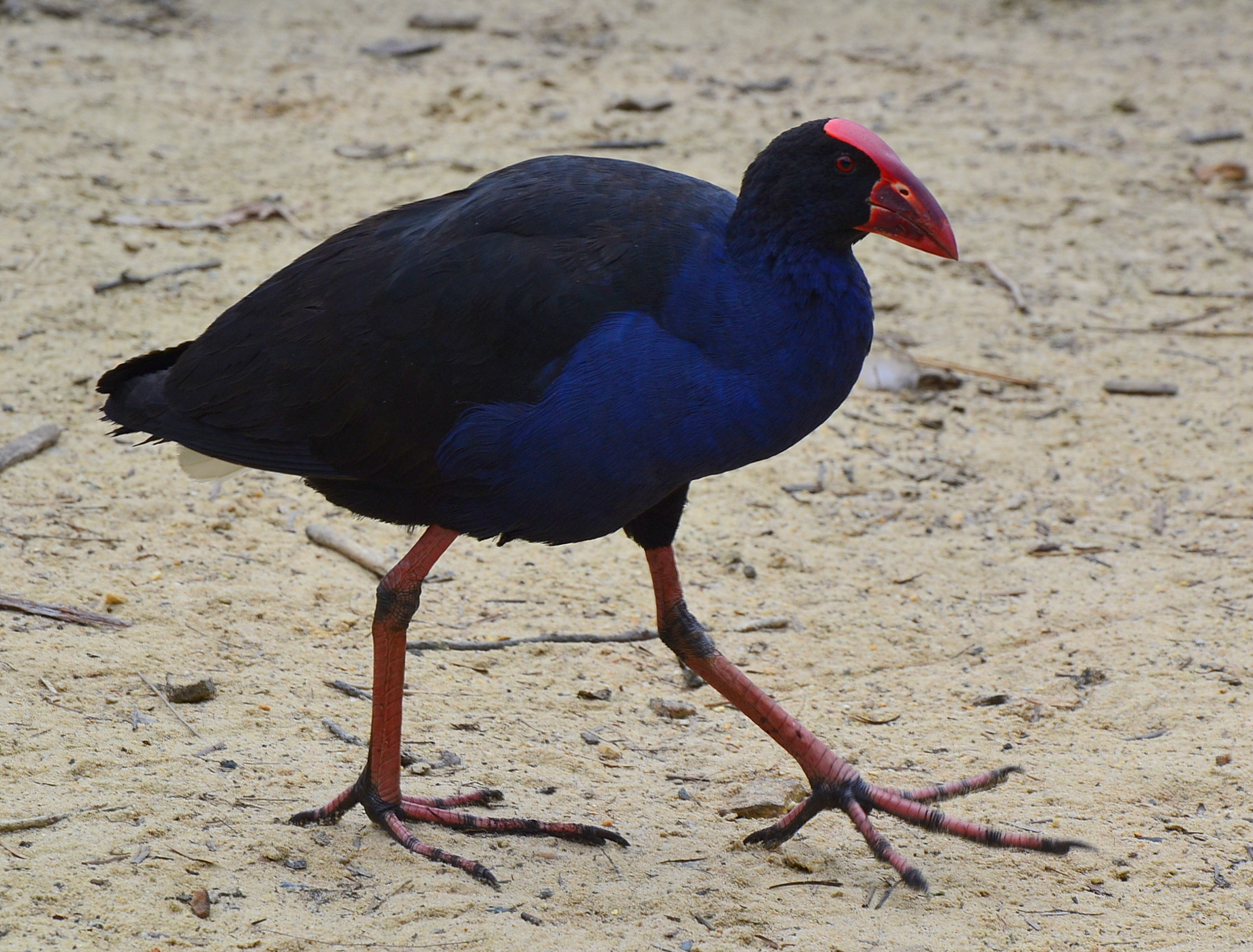
Swamp hen at the lagoon

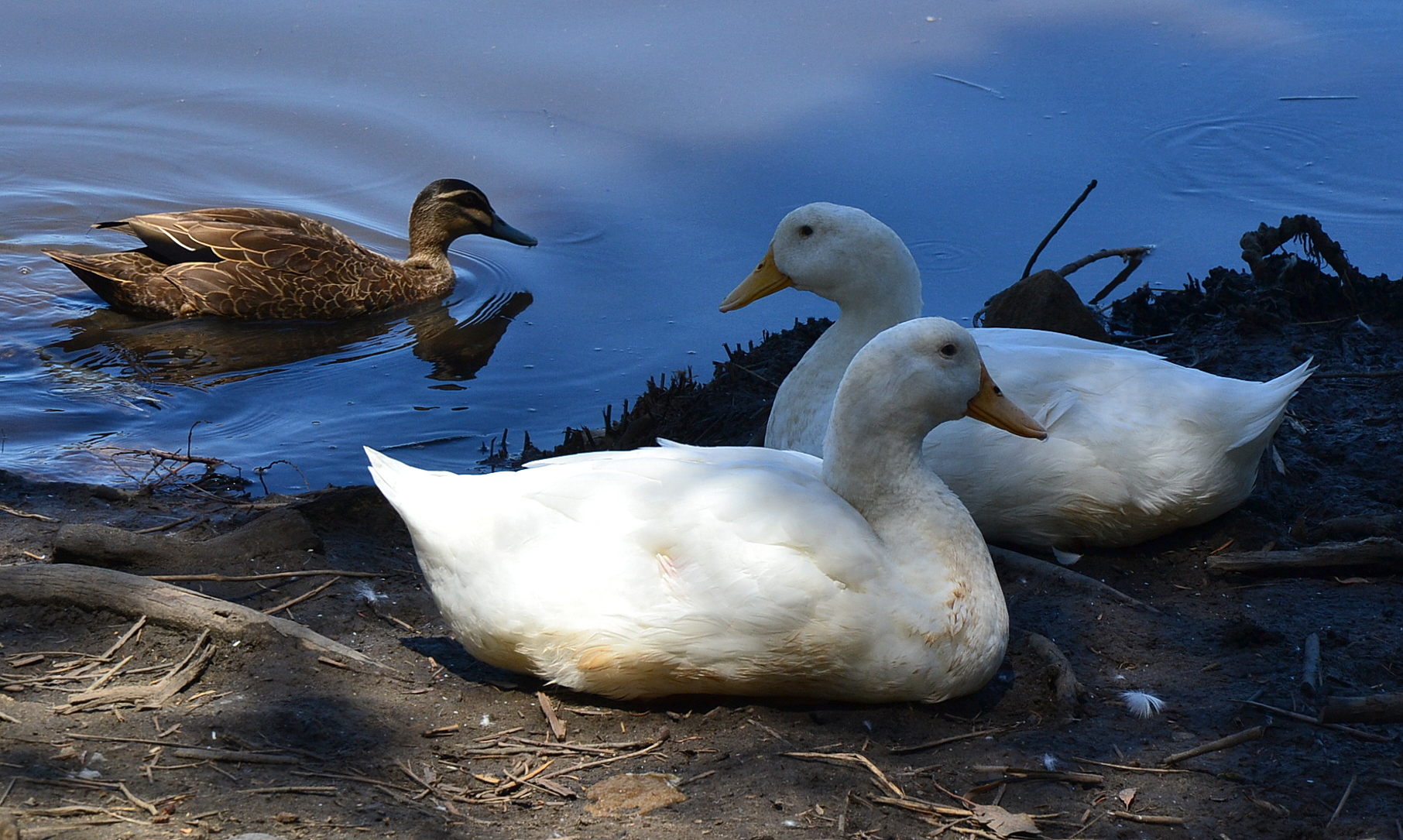
Ducks at the lagoon

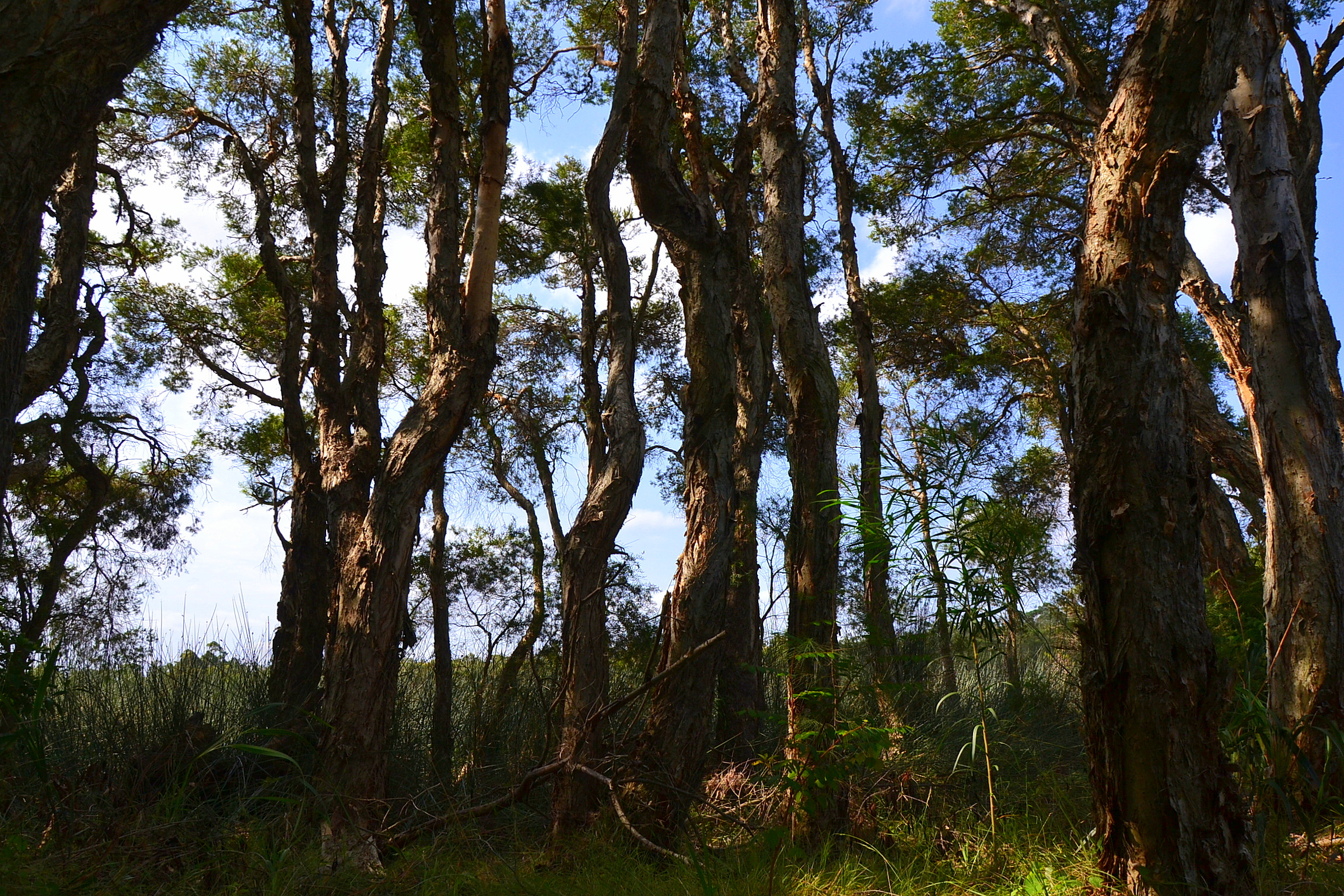
Paperbark trees along the lagoon

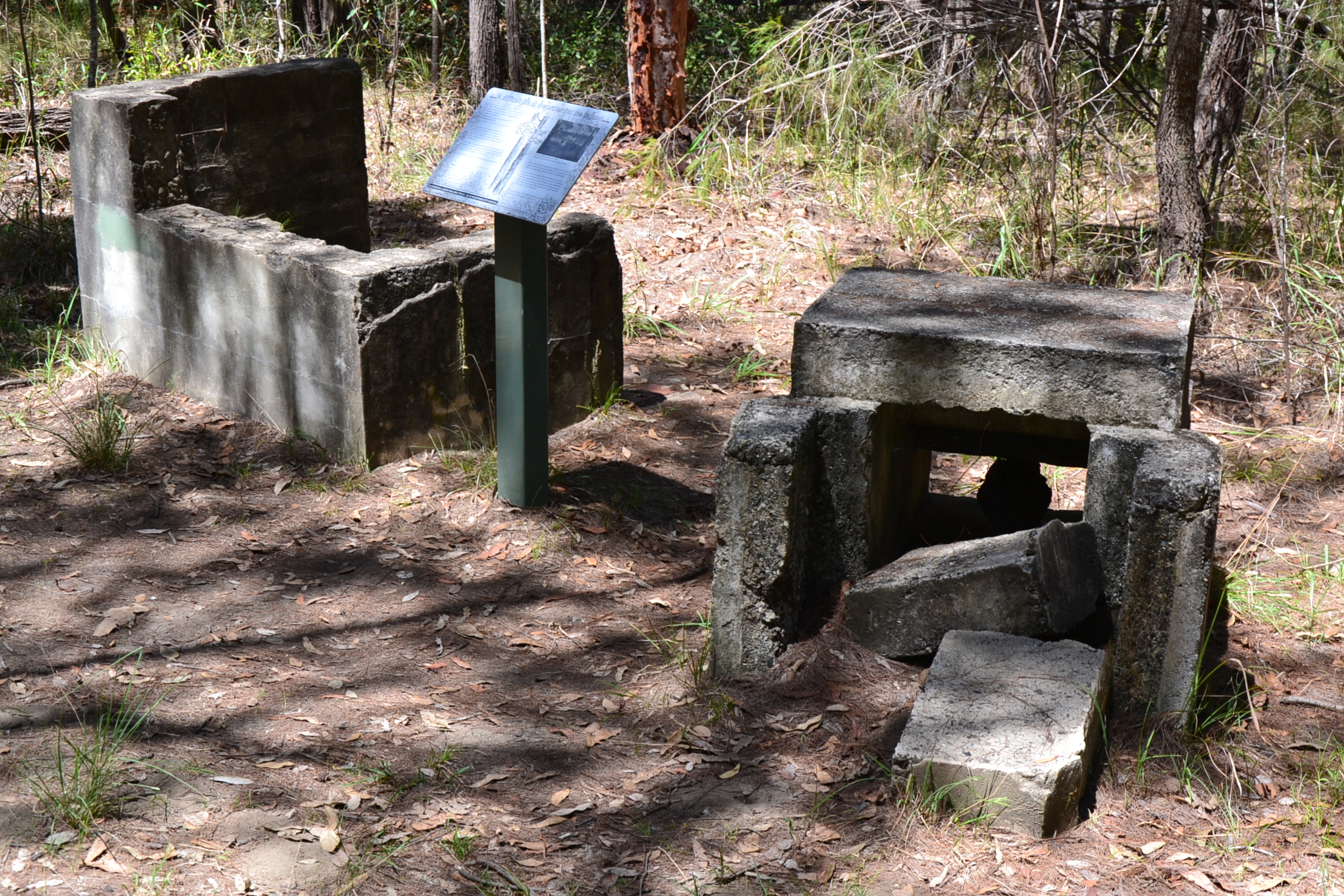
Remains of Ellis family cottage

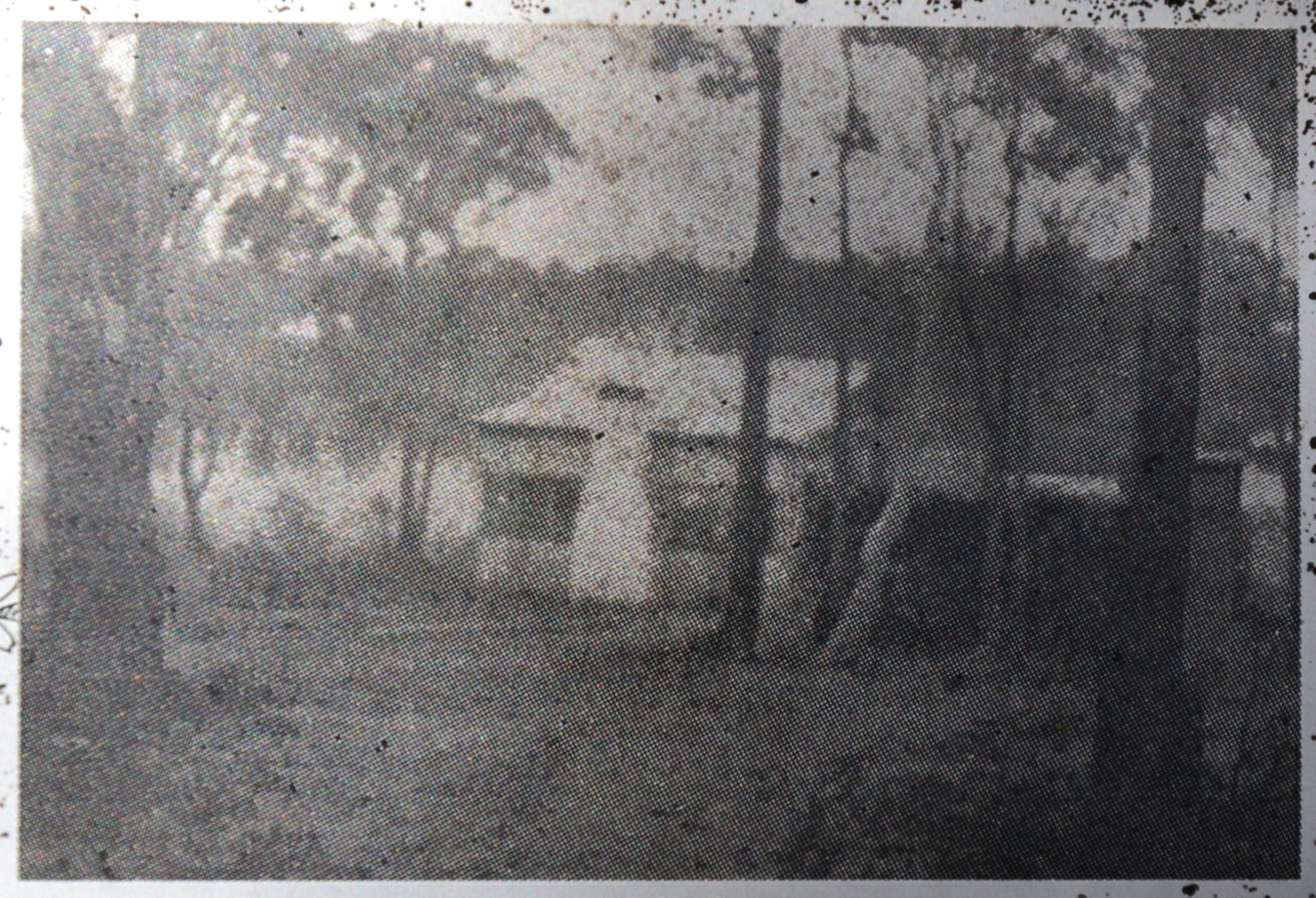
Ellis family cottage circa 1940
