= Glenbrook railway residence =

Glenbrook Railway Residence
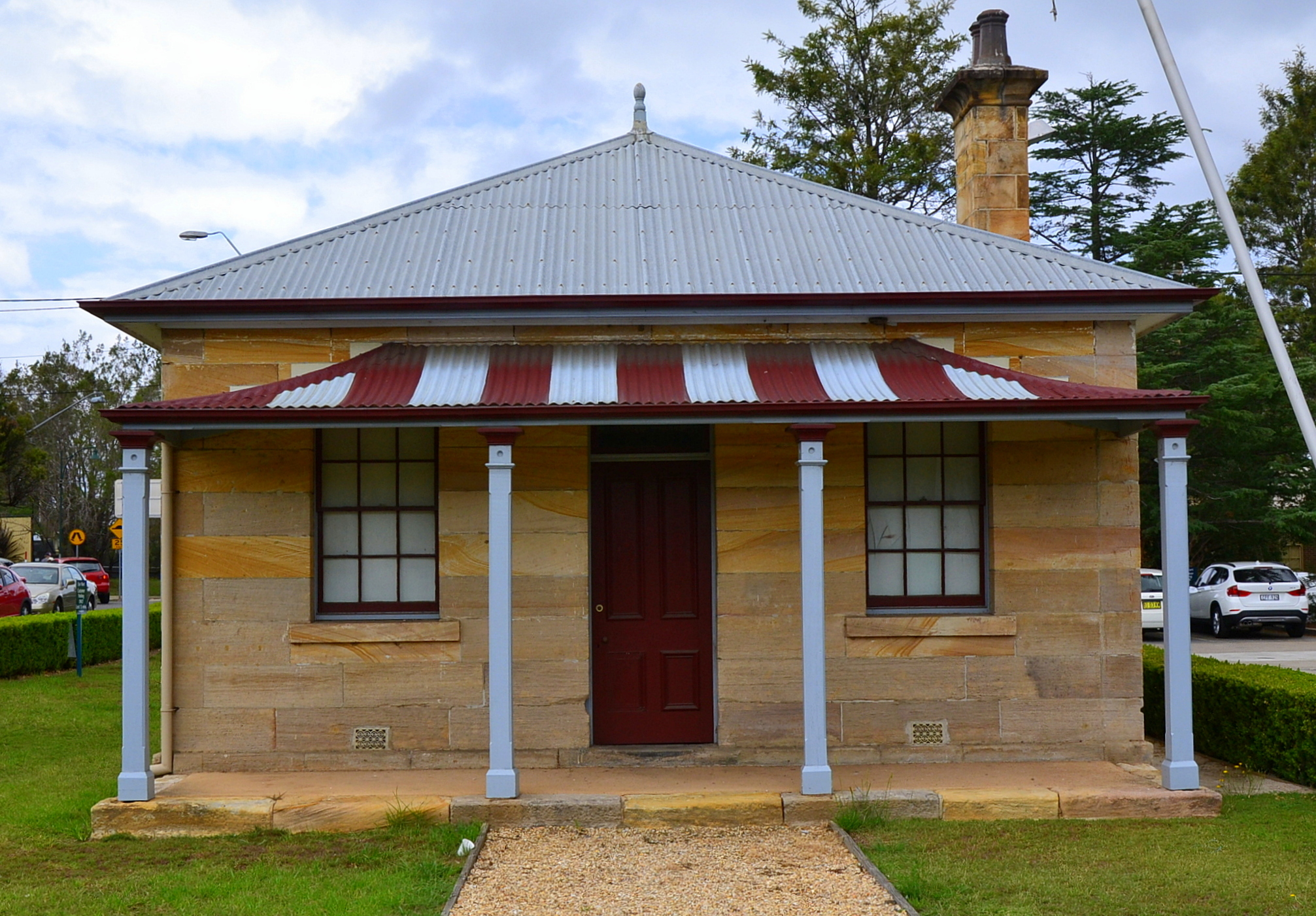
- The railway pointsman's cottage, located near the corner of Ross Street and Great Western Highway, Glenbrook

- Location within New South Wales Location within Australia
- 33°45′55″S 150°37′18″E
- Location: Great Western Highway, Glenbrook, City of Blue Mountains, New South Wales, Australia

Site notes
- Owner: Ampol Pty Ltd

New South Wales Heritage Register
- Official name: Glenbrook Railway Residence; Railway Residence
- Type: State heritage (built)
- Designated: 2 April 1999
- Reference no.: 713
- Type: Railway Residence/Quarters
- Category: Transport - Rail

The Glenbrook Railway Residence is a heritage-listed railway residence located at Great Western Highway, Glenbrook, City of Blue Mountains, New South Wales, Australia. It is also known as Railway Residence. The property is owned by Ampol Pty Ltd. It was added to the New South Wales State Heritage Register on 2 April 1999.

== Heritage listing ==
Glenbrook Railway Residence was listed on the New South Wales State Heritage Register on 2 April 1999.

== See also ==
- Glenbrook railway station
