= Kings Tableland =

Plateau in New South Wales, Australia

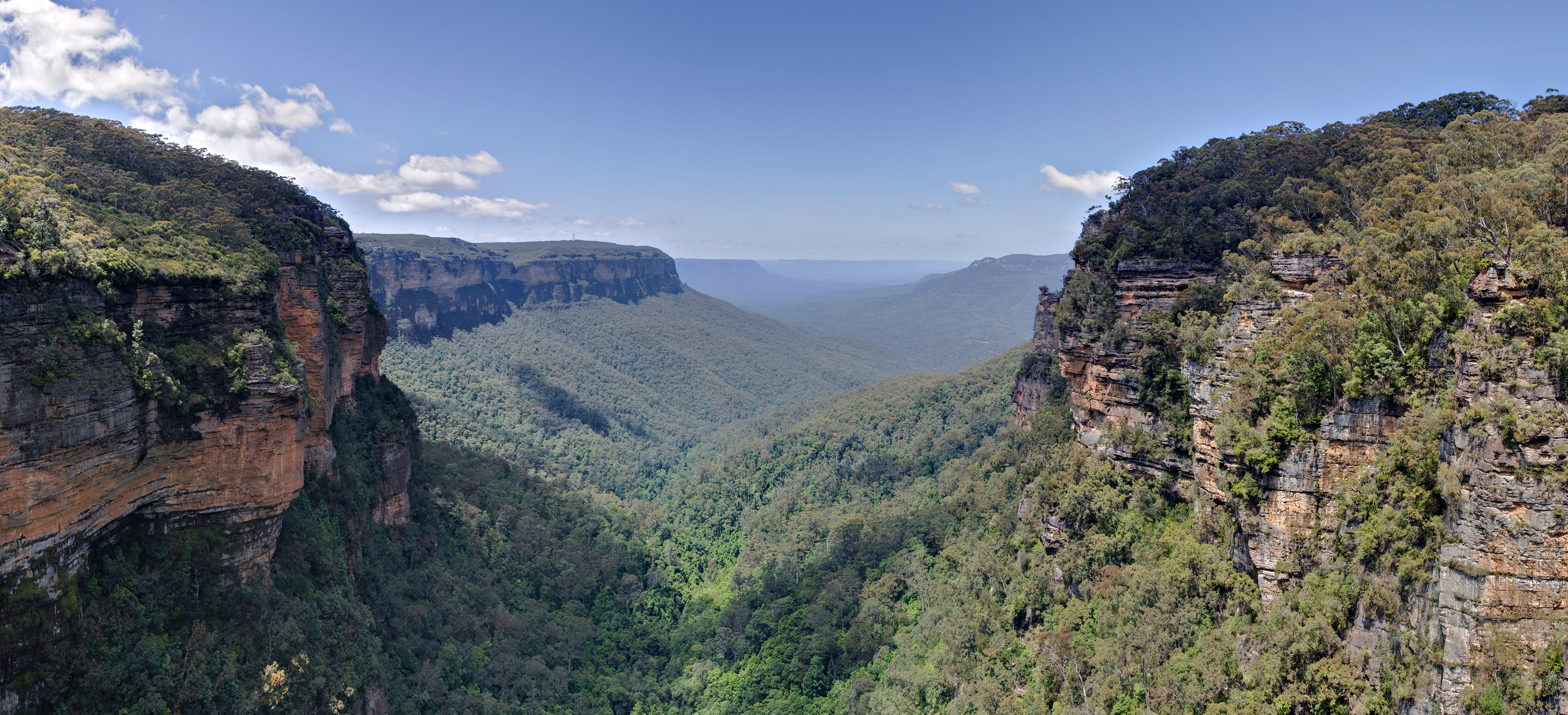
- The plateau of Kings Tableland stretching to the left, above Jamison Valley, centre, 2008.

Highest point
- Elevation: 1,000 m (3,300 ft)
- Coordinates: 33°49′S 150°24′E

Geography
- Location within New South Wales
- Parent range: Blue Mountains Range

Geology
- Mountain type: Sydney sandstone plateau

The Kings Tableland is a plateau located in the Blue Mountains in Wollondilly Shire, New South Wales, Australia.

== Geography ==
The ridge is an eroded remnant of a sandstone layer that is approximately 1,000 metres (3,300 ft) AMSL, situated immediately south of Wentworth Falls. The Tableland is the major southerly spur of the main spine of the Blue Mountains Range and forms the beginning of the Southern Escarpment, an unbroken series of tall sandstone cliffs which fringes the Jamison, Megalong, Kanimbla, and Hartley Valleys.

Situated to the west of the Blue Labyrinth area, Kings Tableland extends from Bodington Hill south to McMahons Lookout, with views over Lake Burragorang, and further about 4.8 kilometres (3.0 mi). The plateau was named by Governor Macquarie after King George III.

It extends southwards from Wentworth Falls and is the eastern boundary of the Jamison Valley. There are also views from several points along the ridge, accessed via paths breaking off the main fire trail. The ridgetop fire trail itself is accessible to four- and all-wheel drive vehicles in good weather conditions, and is used as a mountain biking route.

Along the way is Battleship Tops, an Aboriginal meeting place where ochre paintings could be seen, though these have been damaged by vandalism. A 2007 survey of the area found four rock shelters with paintings and several other sites.

== Indigenous significance ==
A portion of the Kings Tablelands has been gazetted as a camping and meeting place of significance for the Gandangara people. The conserved area includes a sandstone rock platform with extensive grinding and other grooves, a shelter with rock art that has been recorded as being the oldest Aboriginal site in the Blue Mountains region and containing unique vertically engraved depictions of kangaroo and bird tracks.

== Modern developments ==
A road from Wentworth Falls runs north and south along the plateau to the current lookout area of McMahons Point. Before the construction of Warragamba Dam the track continued down the escarpment along a track all the way to the Cox's River area in the Burragorang Valley. There is a track descending from the western edge down into the Jamison Valley, originally leading to the old (now abandoned) sewerage works below the cliffs at Katoomba. The abandoned Queen Victoria Hospital is also located on Kings Tableland.

== Gallery ==
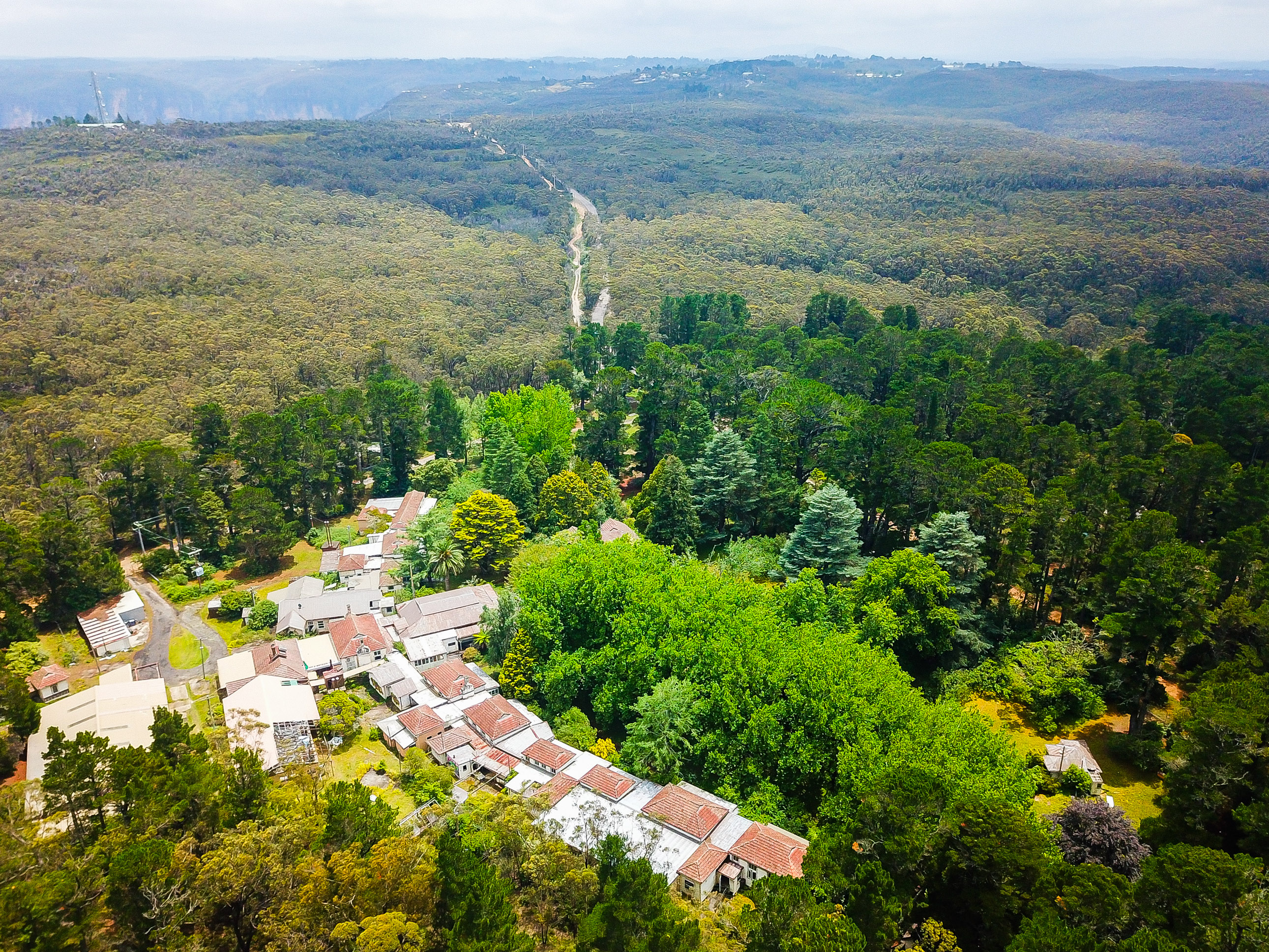
Aerial View Queen Victoria Sanitorium Kings Tableland, 2017

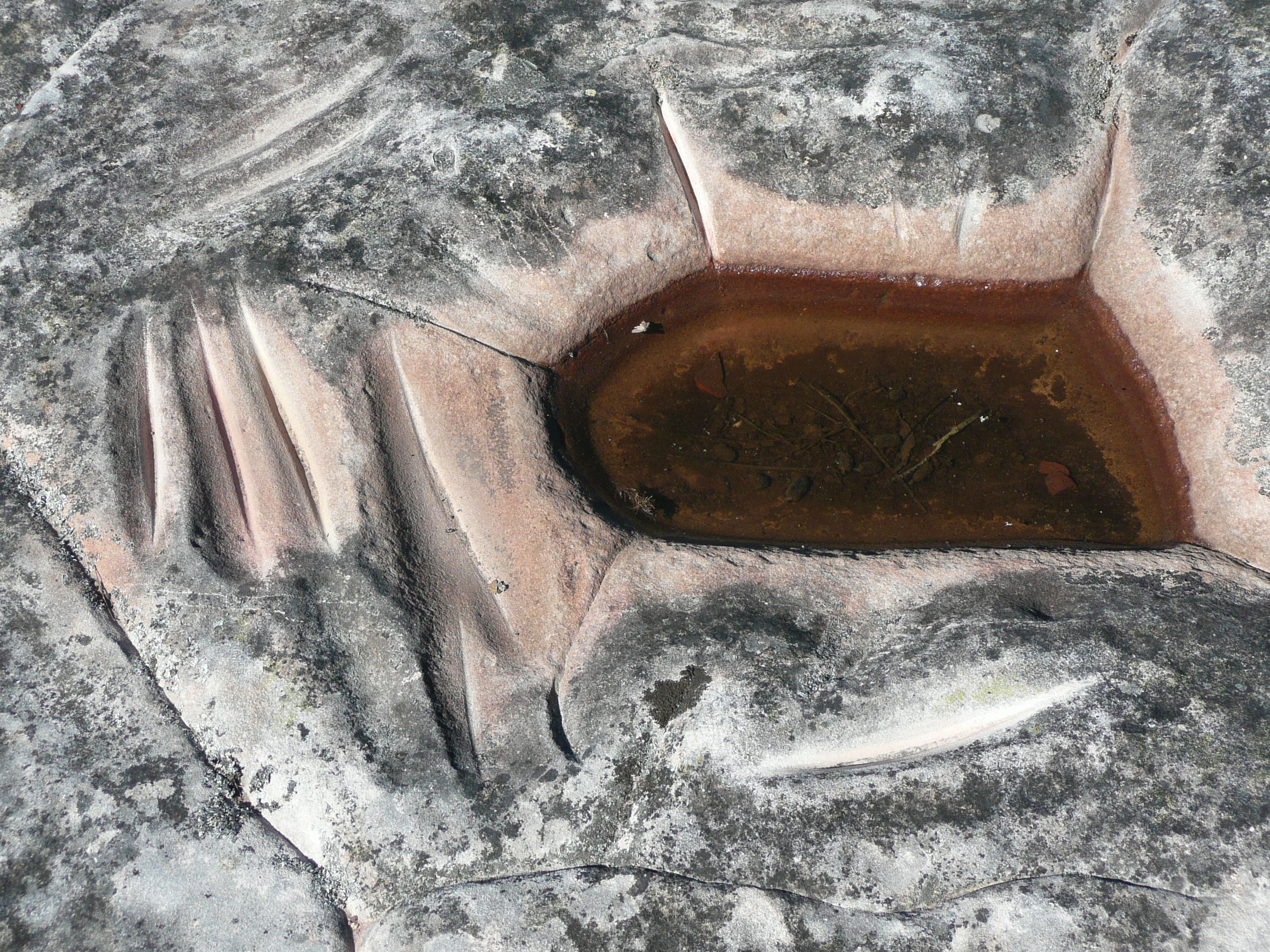
Grinding grooves, Aboriginal site, 2009

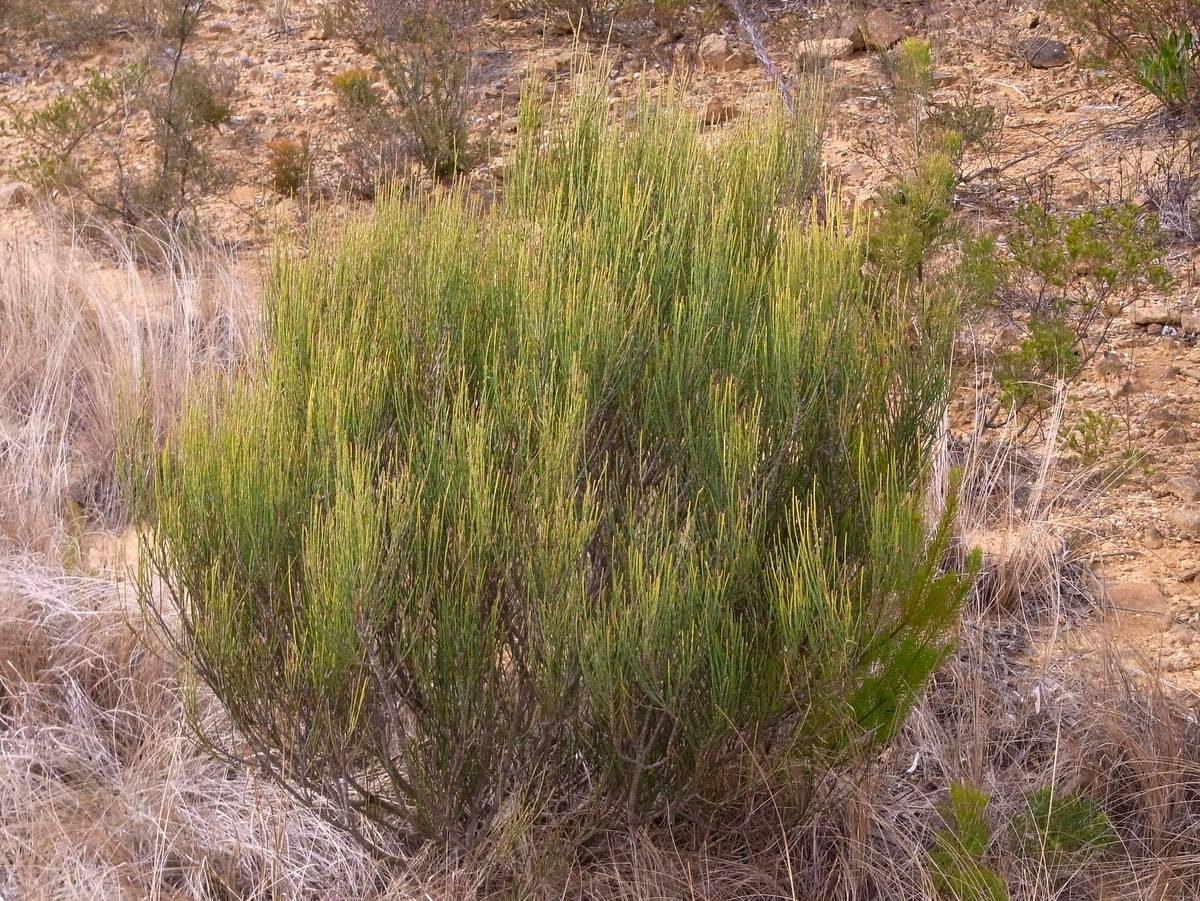
Allocasuarina nana, commonly known as the dwarf she-oak, found on Kings Tablelands, 2011

== See also ==
- List of Blue Mountains subjects
- List of mountains in Australia § New South Wales

== Bibliography ==
- Smith, Jim (2009). "New insights into Gundungurra place naming". In Koch, Harold (ed.). Aboriginal Placenames: Naming and Re-Naming the Australian Landscape (PDF). Canberra: Australian National University. pp. 87–114. ISBN 9781921666087.
