= Red Hands Cave =

Australian Aboriginal rock art site

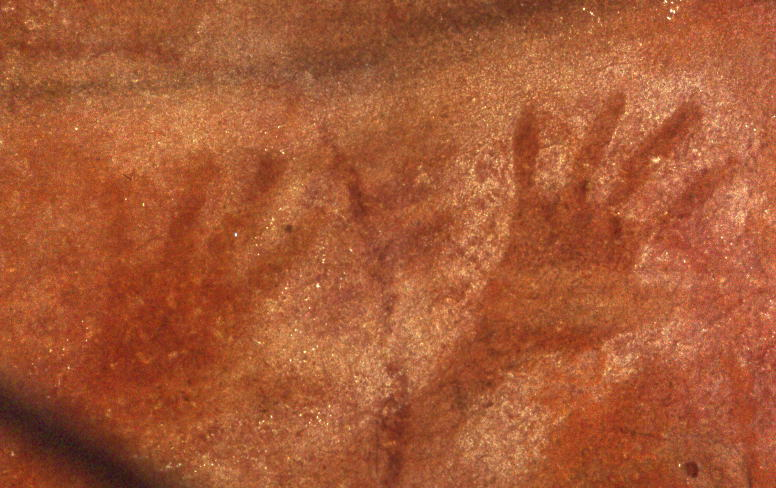

- Location within New South Wales
- Location: New South Wales
- Coordinates: 33°46′56″S 150°35′28″E

Red Hands Cave is an Australian Aboriginal rock art site in the Blue Labyrinth area of Blue Mountains National Park. It is a rock shelter located within walking distance from the town of Glenbrook, New South Wales.

== History ==
The ochre handprints and stencils at Red Hands Cave were painted around 500–1,600 years B.P.

The cave was first discovered by white Australians on 10 August 1913, when James (Jim) Colquhoun Dunn (1892-1978) went searching for Ruby Gladys Hunter (1892–1973), who became lost in the bush near Glenbrook while collecting wild flowers with her two dogs. Both were Glenbrook residents who were about 21 years old at the time. Ruby Hunter was later found and was able to return home.

In the early 1930s, the Blue Mountains Shire Council installed a wire screen fence at the cave to protect it from vandalism.

== See also ==
- Aboriginal sites of New South Wales
- Sydney rock engravings
