= Glenbrook Partners =

US-based payments consulting firm

- Company type: Private
- Industry: Management consulting
- Founded: 2001; 25 years ago
- Headquarters: Decatur, Georgia
- Area served: United States
- Number of employees: 15
- Website: glenbrook.com

Glenbrook Partners (informally Glenbrook) is an American strategy, research, and management consulting firm that offers consulting on the subject of payments to large corporations. They also consult on payments-adjacent subjects, such as blockchain and cryptocurrency technologies. It was founded in 2001, and is headquartered in Decatur, Georgia, with significant operations in San Mateo, California.

Glenbrook consults with various operators in the payments space, but also proactively publishes independent research in the form of white papers and other payments-related content. They publish books via a publishing arm, Glenbrook Press, and operate the Payments on Fire industry podcast.
