= Glenbrook High School =

Glenbrook High School may refer to:

- Glenbrook North High School, Northbrook, Cook County, Illinois, which was the only Glenbrook High School until its sister high school was built.
- Glenbrook South High School, Glenview, Cook County, Illinois, GBN's sister high school.
