= Glenbrook, Nevada County, California =

Glenbrook
- Former settlement
- Location in California
- Coordinates: 39°14′32″N 121°02′04″W
- Country: United States
- State: California
- County: Nevada County
- Elevation: 2,726 ft (831 m)
- Time zone: UTC-8 (Pacific (PST))
  - Summer (DST): UTC-7 (PDT)

Glenbrook is a former settlement in Nevada County, California, located near Grass Valley. It was listed on an official map as of 1949.

== History ==
In the late 1800s, the Shelton College and Nevada County Academy were located at Glenbrook.

In 1887, Glenbrook became notable for the Glenbrook Park and Racetrack where the first outdoor sports event was lit by electricity.
