= Glenbrook, New South Wales =

Glenbrook
- Suburb
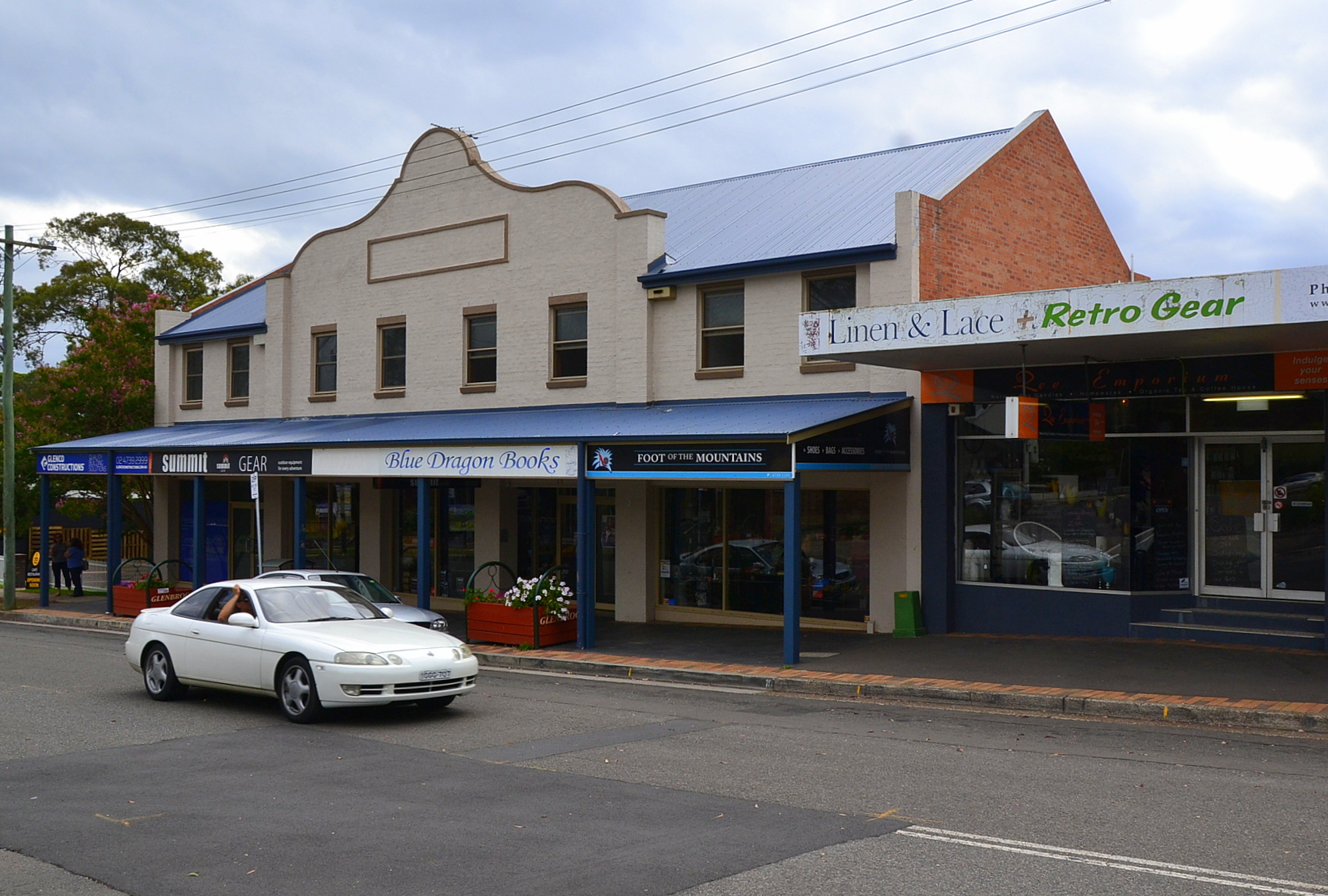
- Ross Street, Glenbrook

- Interactive map of Glenbrook
- Coordinates: 33°46′00″S 150°37′10″E
- Country: Australia
- State: New South Wales
- City: Blue Mountains
- LGA: City of Blue Mountains
- Location: 63 km (39 mi) west of Sydney CBD; 40 km (25 mi) east of Katoomba
- Established: approx. 1870 (approx. 155 years old)

Government
  - State electorate: Blue Mountains
  - Federal division: Macquarie
- Elevation: 163 m (535 ft)

Population
  - Total: 5,078 (2021 census)
- Postcode: 2773
Suburbs around Glenbrook
Blaxland	Blaxland	Emu Plains
Blue Mountains National Park	Glenbrook	Leonay
Blue Mountains National Park	Blue Mountains National Park	Lapstone

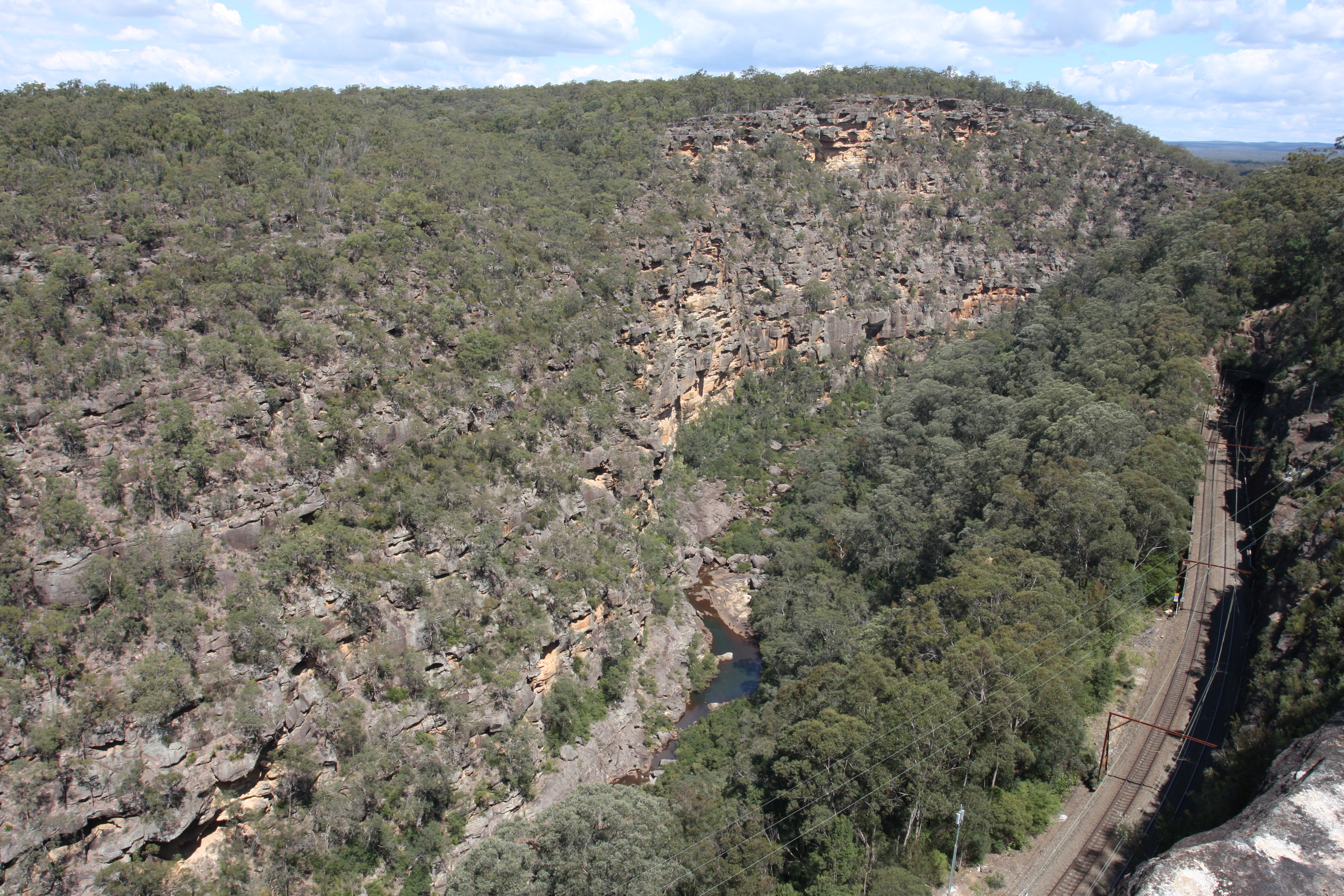
Overlooking Glenbrook Creek and the Blue Mountains line

Glenbrook is a township of the Lower Blue Mountains of New South Wales, Australia. It is located 63 kilometres (39 mi) west of the Sydney central business district, in the local government area of the City of Blue Mountains. As of the 2021 Australian census Glenbrook had a population of 5,078 people.

Glenbrook lies between Lapstone and Blaxland at an elevation of 163 metres (535 feet) and is approximately a 50-minute drive from Sydney. It is home to many cafes and boutiques, while offering various tourist attractions, including weekend markets, recreational opportunities and native flora and fauna.

The town takes its name from Glenbrook Creek, which is on the southern side of the village and must be crossed to enter parts of the Blue Mountains National Park. Glenbrook retains many historical homes and buildings throughout the village, although most of these are occupied and not open to the public.

== History ==
Explorers Gregory Blaxland, William Charles Wentworth, and William Lawson reached Glenbrook area and Lagoon on their trek across the Blue Mountains on 12 May 1813 and described it as "a large lagoon of good water full of very coarse rushes".

In 1815, William Cox constructed the first road over the Blue Mountains with a gang of convicts and the Glenbrook area became an important stopping point after a storeroom was built near the lagoon. Governor Macquarie also built a military depot near the lagoon to monitor traffic on the newly built road.

After years of use, Cox's road up Lapstone Hill ran into a few problems. It was very steep in sections and in rain became slippery. A new road and stone bridge was built and opened to traffic in 1833 "The Western Road", at what is today Mitchell's Pass, planned and built by Thomas Livingstone Mitchell. The stone bridge, Lennox Bridge completed in 1833 and designed by Scottish stonemason David Lennox, is the oldest surviving stone bridge on the Australian mainland.

Glenbrook became a town in the 1870s as a result of the arrival of the railway. In 1867 a zigzag railway was built up the Lapstone Hill and on to Weatherboard "Wentworth Falls". A siding was also built at Glenbrook "Wascoe's Siding", named after an Inn from the local area, water from Glenbrook Lagoon was piped to supply the trains after traversing the Lapstone ZigZag. This Wascoe's Siding became a passenger station in 1877. In 1878, Sir Alfred Stephen, Chief Justice and Privy Councillor, decided to give the station a proper name and called it Brookdale, but later it was officially changed to Glenbrook in 1879, named after the nearby creek and Gorge. Glenbrook, which Sir John Jamison thought came from Regents Glen. A village sprung up near the station and was officially proclaimed Glenbrook, six years later.

The Lapstone ZigZag opened in 1867, a part of the ascent of Lapstone Hill on a gradient of 1 in 30–33, which was built up the side of the range with comparatively light earthwork, although it includes the substantial seven-span sandstone Knapsack Viaduct. This was later widened to carry the old Great Western Highway, and it is now part of a walking trail on the old railway/highway alignment, including a memorial to the engineer in charge of the construction of the Blue Mountains line and many other early railways, John Whitton.

In 1892 the first deviation of the railway up the Lapstone Hill, bypassed the Lapstone Zig Zag altogether. A tunnel was built through the hill to the Old Glenbrook station (subsequently dismantled). The 1892 Glenbrook Tunnel ran into trouble with water seeping from the nearby creek and the steep gradient making the climb hard for most trains, often getting stuck in the tunnel.

In 1913 the second deviation of the railway line up Lapstone Hill was completed with a new double-tracked 1913 tunnel at the Bluff Point. The old 1892 Glenbrook Tunnel was subsequently closed. As a result of the new line, the Old Glenbrook station was relocated from next to the Great Western Highway to its current location next to the village of Glenbroook at the end of Ross Street, and was officially opened 11 May 1913.

The abandoned 1892 Glenbrook Tunnel has been used to store mustard gas during World War II, and grow mushrooms in recent times. The eastern entrance can be still seen from a walking track at Lapstone.

On 28 January 1941, an Avro Anson of No. 1 Air Navigation School, Parkes crashed near Glenbrook during a medical evacuation flight from Parkes to the Sydney Airport. All five crew members were killed.

In 1976, the town was associated with the 1976 Glenbrook rail accident, when a 46 class locomotive collided with a V set commuter train.

In 1999, the town was associated with the Glenbrook train disaster, when the Trans-Australian Indian Pacific train collided with a V Set commuter train.

Since 2005, the suburb has been the home of The Australian Gnome Convention organised by the Rotary Club of Lower Blue Mountains and held on Australia Day each year. Owners of garden gnomes display their garden decorations and compete for various awards to raise funds for charities.

== Bushwalking ==
Glenbrook hosts many walking tracks that can be trekked, including the walk to Red Hands Cave, from Glenbrook Causeway, which is a 8.1 kilometres (5.0 mi) return walk from Glenbrook's town centre. On the trail to the caves, along the banks of Camp Fire Creek, there are also aboriginal axe grinding grooves on the Sydney Sandstone.

Other walks include the untracked walk to Warrimoo via Glenbrook Gorge and Florabella Pass, and the walk to Blaxland via Pippas Pass.

Additionally, Glenbrook hosts many natural pools and swimming holes, that can be accessed by walking tracks from the town centre, by a few kilometres.

== Heritage listings ==
=== New South Wales State Heritage Register ===
Glenbrook has a number of heritage-listed sites, including the following items listed on the New South Wales State Heritage Register:

- Blue Mountains National Park: Blue Mountains walking tracks
- 15-17 Great Western Highway: Knapsack Gully Viaduct, 1865
- 78 Great Western Highway: Glenbrook railway residence
- Great Western Highway: 1892 Glenbrook Tunnel
- Mitchells Pass: Lennox Bridge, Glenbrook – the oldest surviving stone arch bridge in mainland Australia

=== City of Blue Mountains local government heritage register ===
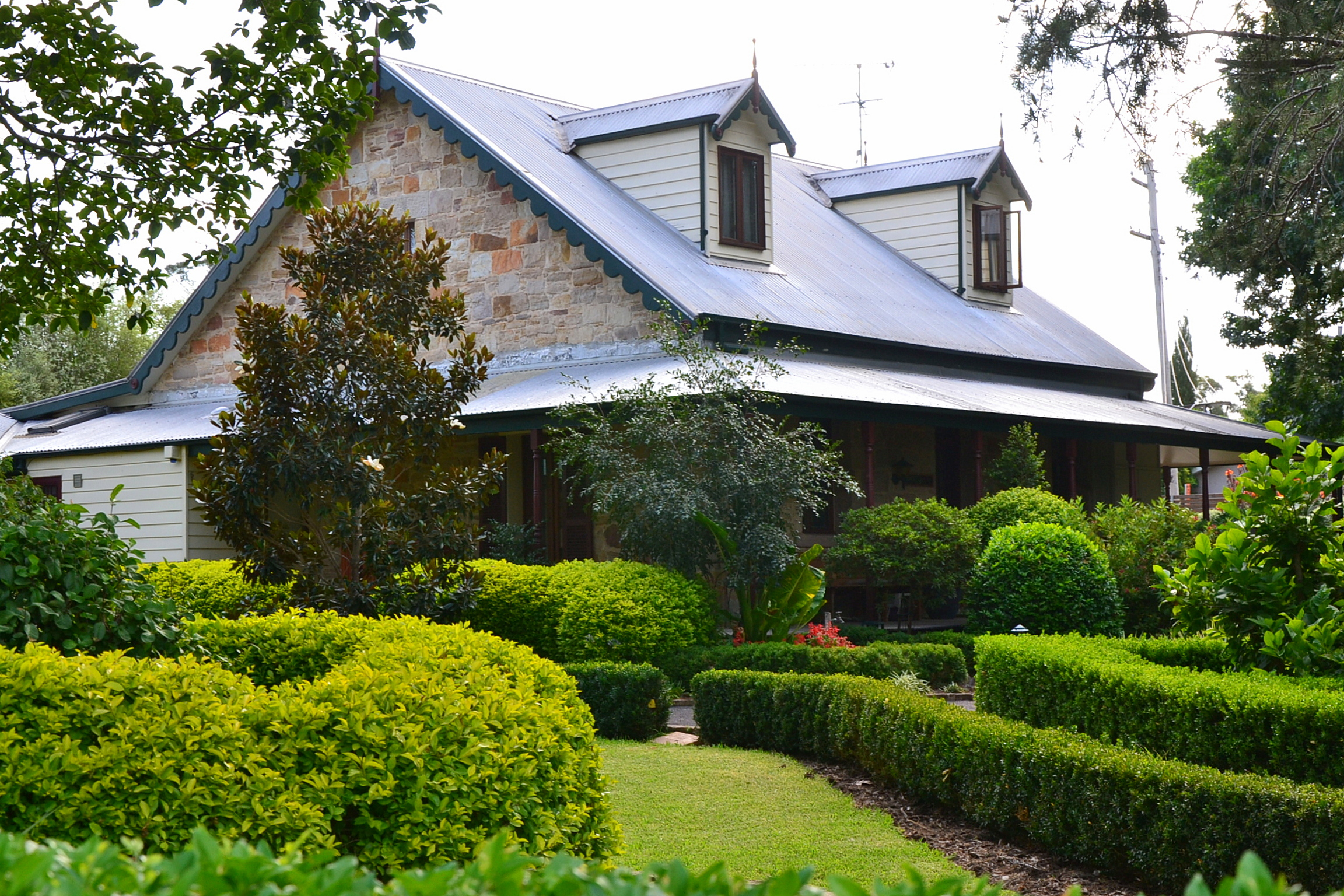
Ilford House, Wascoe Street

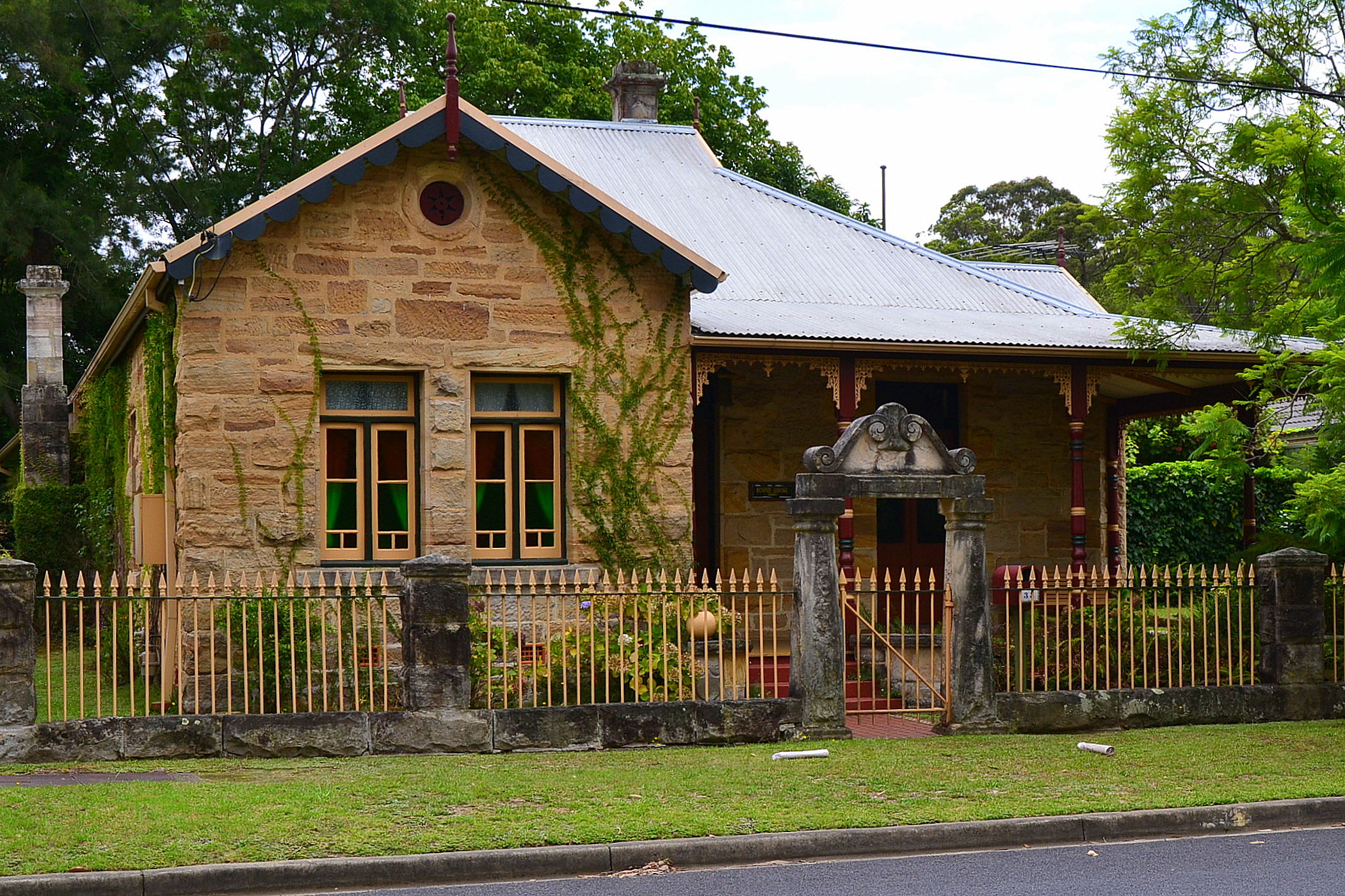
Bonnie Doone, Moore Street

Glenbrook has a number of heritage-listed sites, including (but not limited to) the following items listed on the City of Blue Mountains local government heritage register, as recorded in the New South Wales Heritage Database

- Blue Mountains National Park: Red Hands Cave
- Burfitt Parade: Glenbrook railway station
- Great Western Highway: Glenbrook Deviation (1913)
- 2 Great Western Highway: Gatekeeper's Cottage No 1
- 15 Great Western Highway: Glenbrook Deviation (1892)
- 15-17 Great Western Highway: Lapstone Zig Zag
- 29 Great Western Highway: Briarcliffe (now RAAF Base Glenbrook)
- 29 Great Western Highway: Former Lapstone Hotel (now RAAF Base Glenbrook)
- 41 Great Western Highway: Glenbrook Native Plant Reserve
- 12 Hare Street: Glenbrook School of Music
- Off Knapsack Street: Lucasville Station
- 15-19 Lagoon Drive: Glenbrook Lagoon
- 37 Lucasville Road: Kalamunda
- 6 Nepean Gardens Place: Ulinbawn
- 10 Park Street: Glenbrook Primary School
- 20-30 Park Street: Glenbrook Park
- 20 Ross Street: Glenbrook Garden Centre

== Population ==
In the 2021 Census, there were 5,078 people in Glenbrook. 83.9% of people were born in Australia. The next most common country of birth was England at 5.2%. 90.9% of people spoke only English at home. The most common responses for religion were No Religion 41.6%, Catholic 22% and Anglican 15.9%.

== Transport ==
Glenbrook railway station is on the Blue Mountains Line of the NSW TrainLink intercity network. The Great Western Highway passes through the town.

== Services ==
Glenbrook has two fire brigade stations, one which falls under the jurisdiction of the volunteer Rural Fire Service as well as a 'retained' New South Wales Fire Brigades station (station 301)

== Recreation ==
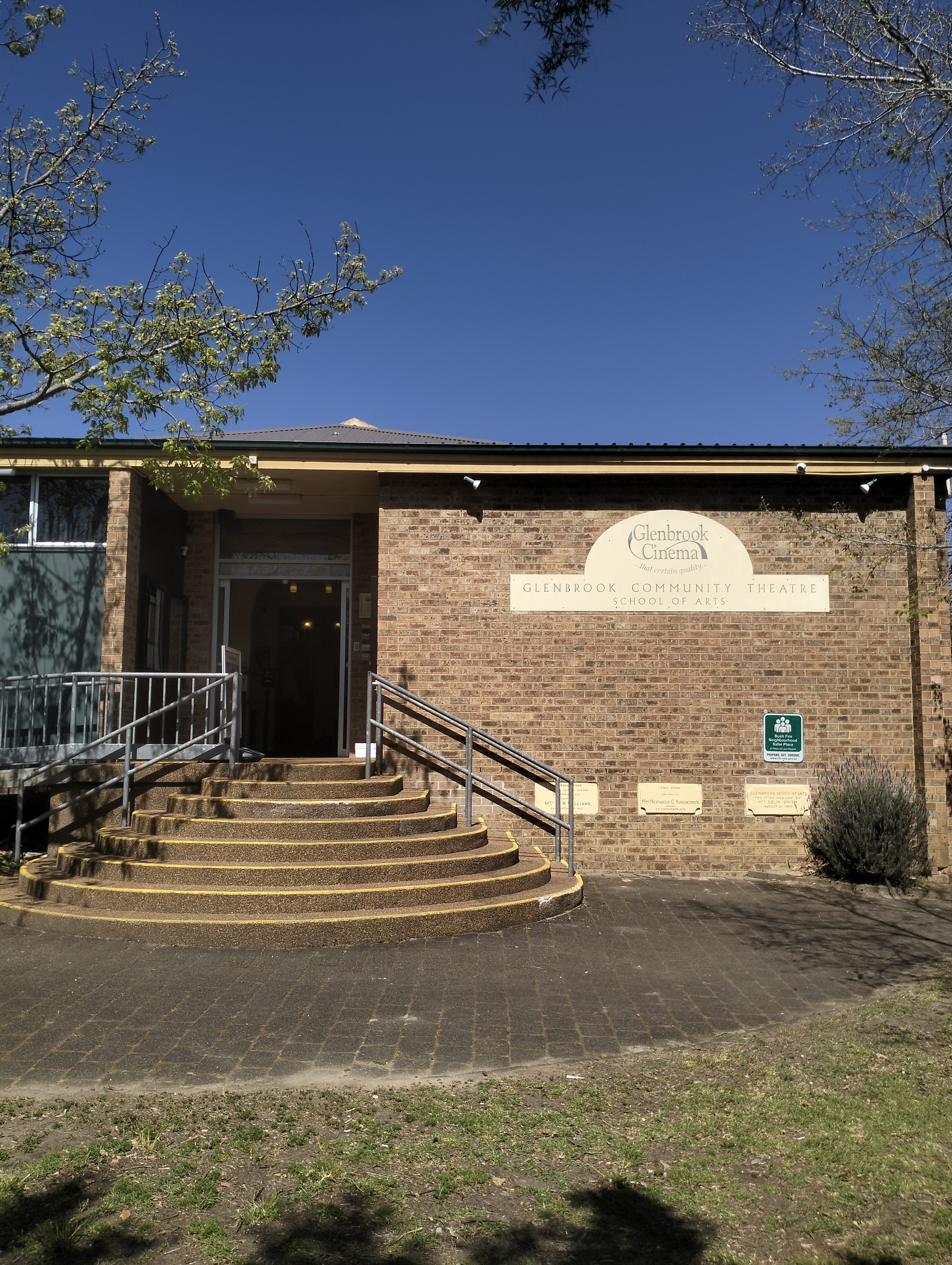
Glenbrook Cinema

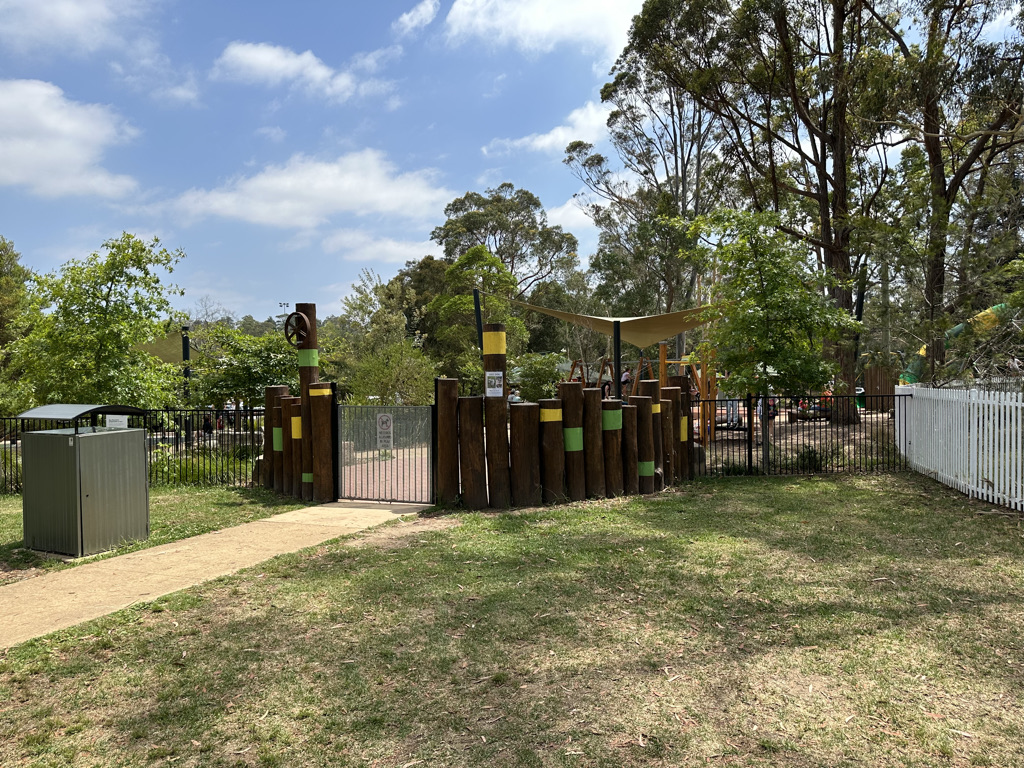
Glenbrook Park

Founded in 1975, the Lapstone-Glenbrook Netball Club was formed from a merger between what was St Peter's Netball Club and school-based teams at Lapstone Public School and Glenbrook Public School. St Peter's Netball Club was a founding club of the Blue Mountains Netball Association and was run from the church organisation previously based in the St Peter's Anglican Church building which is now used as a cafe in Glenbrook). Netball is currently the largest participation sport in the Blue Mountains and all matches are played at the Lapstone complex.

Glen Brook also has a swimming centre.

Other sporting clubs in the area include:

- Glenbrook Swimming Club
- Glenbrook/Blaxland Cricket Club
- Blue Mountains Football Club
- Glenbrook Panthers Bowling Club
- Glenbrook Little Athletics Club

=== Parks ===
- Mount Sion Park
- Sir Douglas Smith Park
- Wascoe Siding Train Park
- Whitton Park
- Glenbrook Oval
- Glenbrook Park (1884), which includes the Glenbrook Stone Suburb Staircase

== Gallery ==
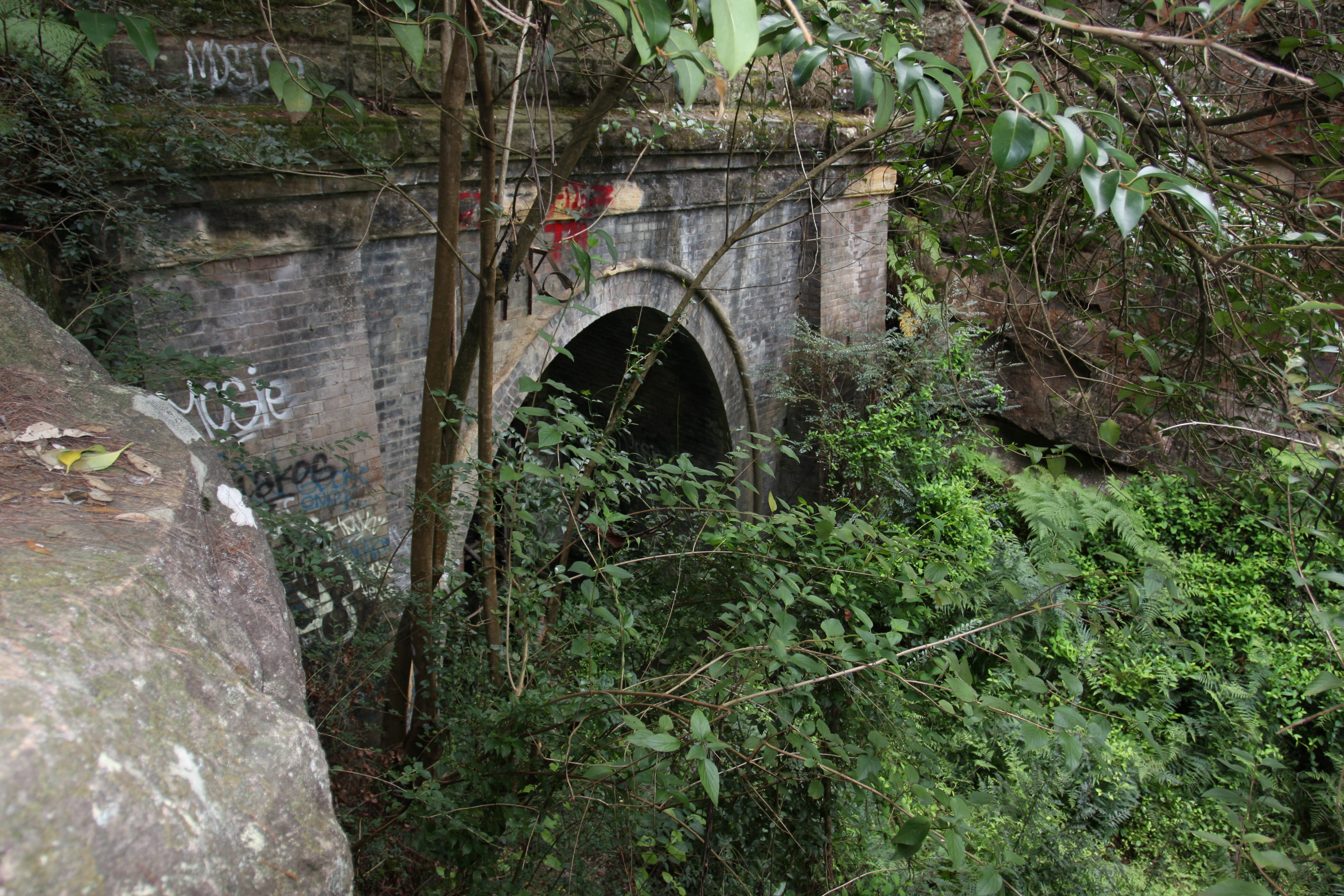
Glenbrook Tunnel (1892)

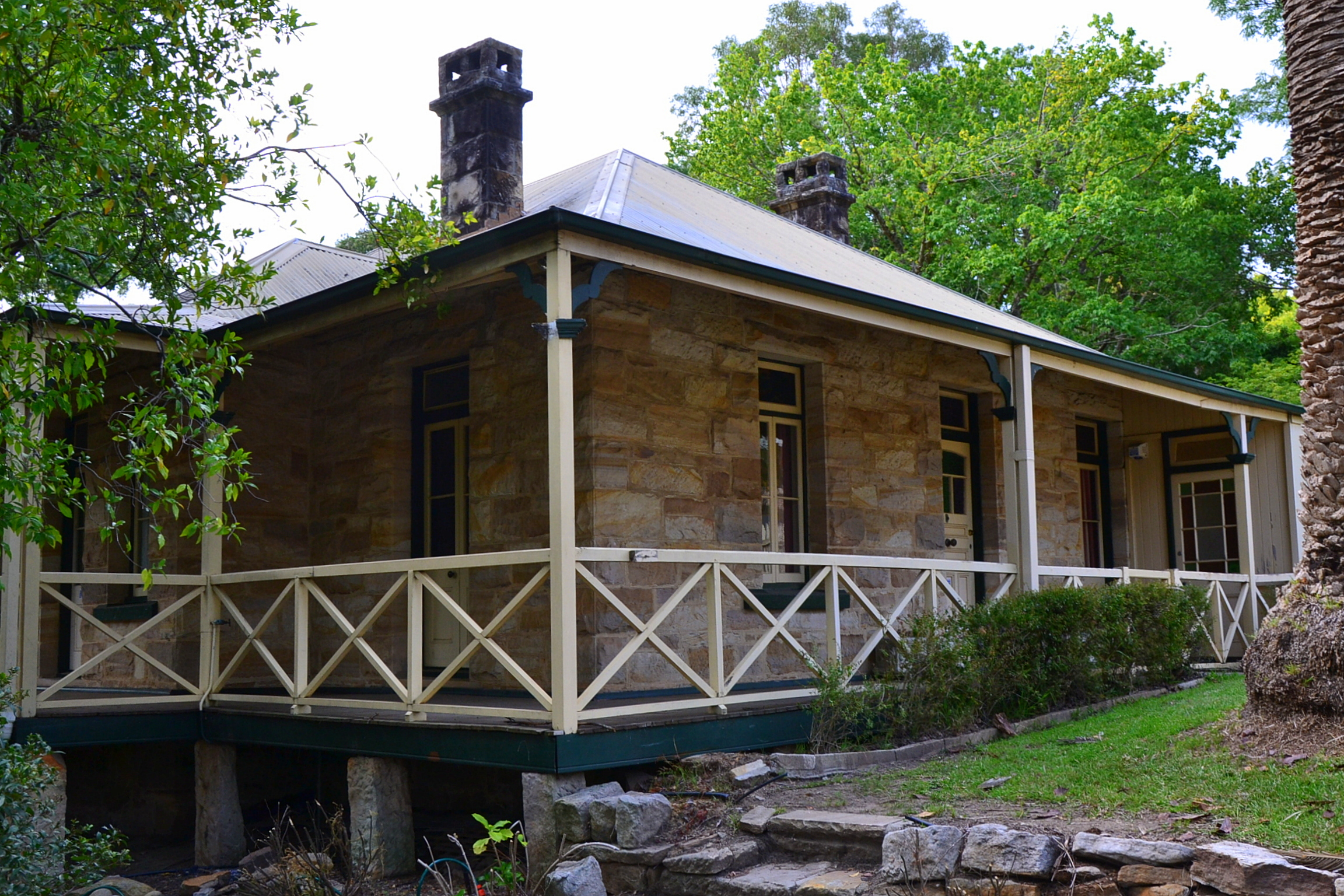
Former School of Music, Hare Street

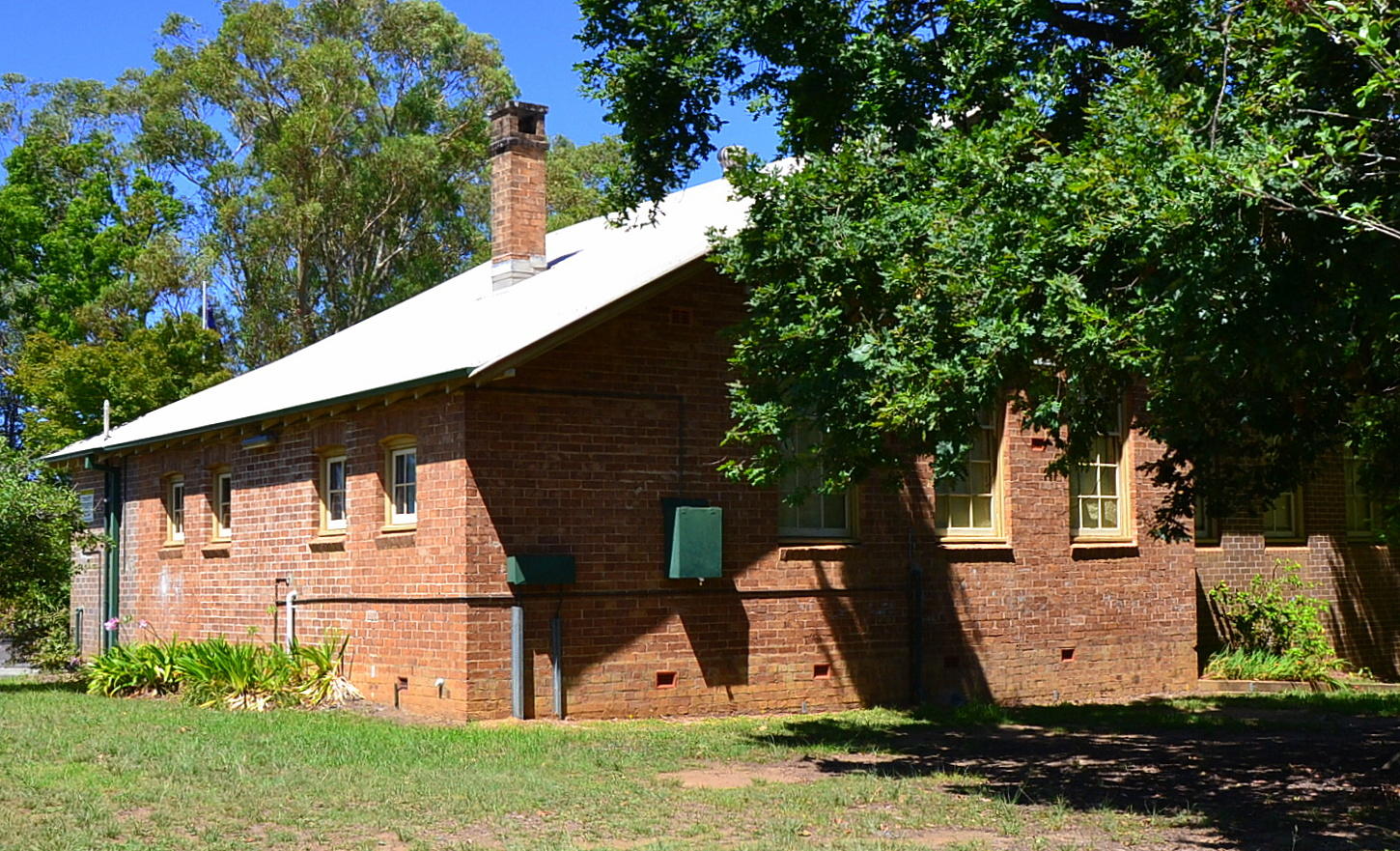
Glenbrook Public School

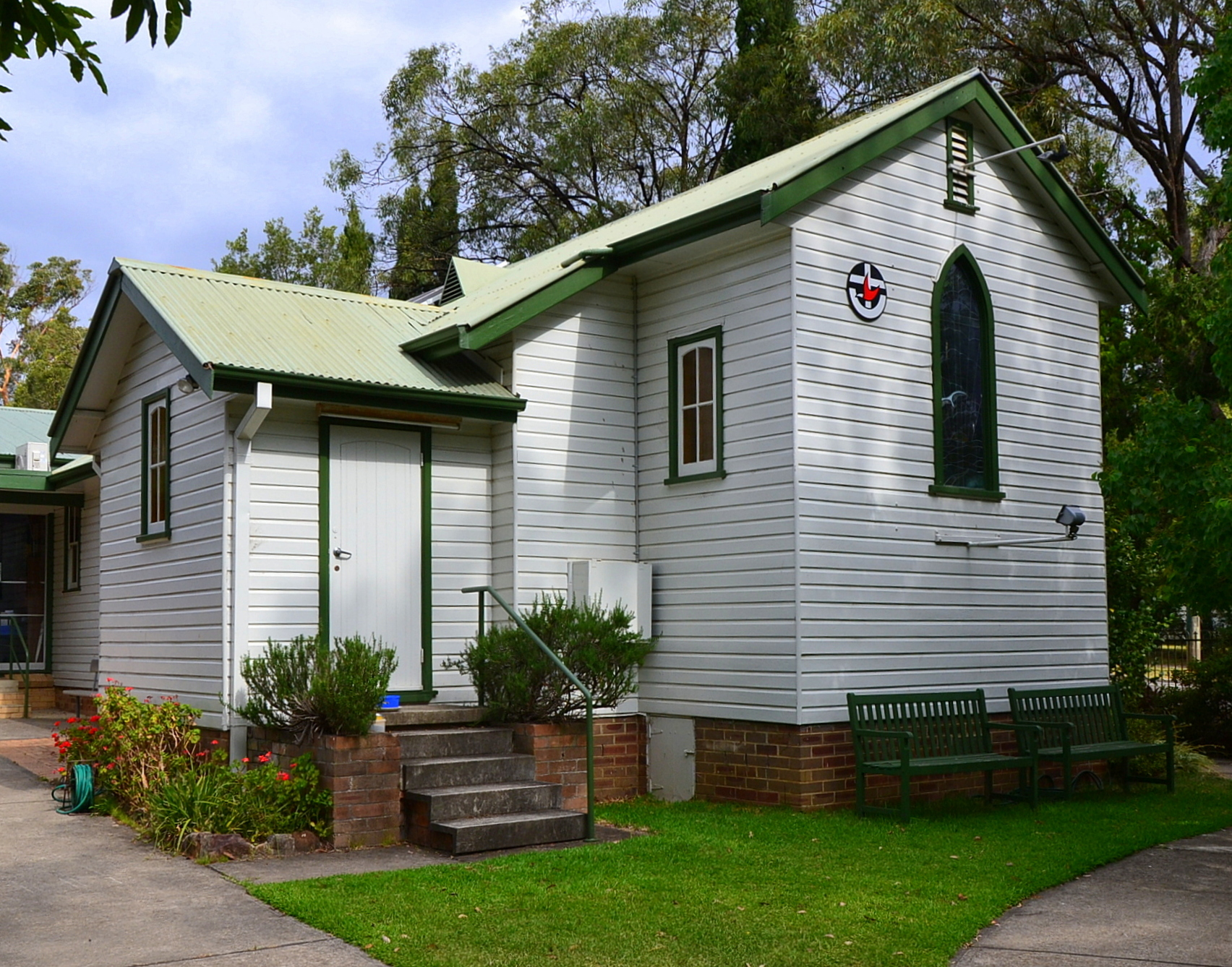
St Andrew's Uniting Church

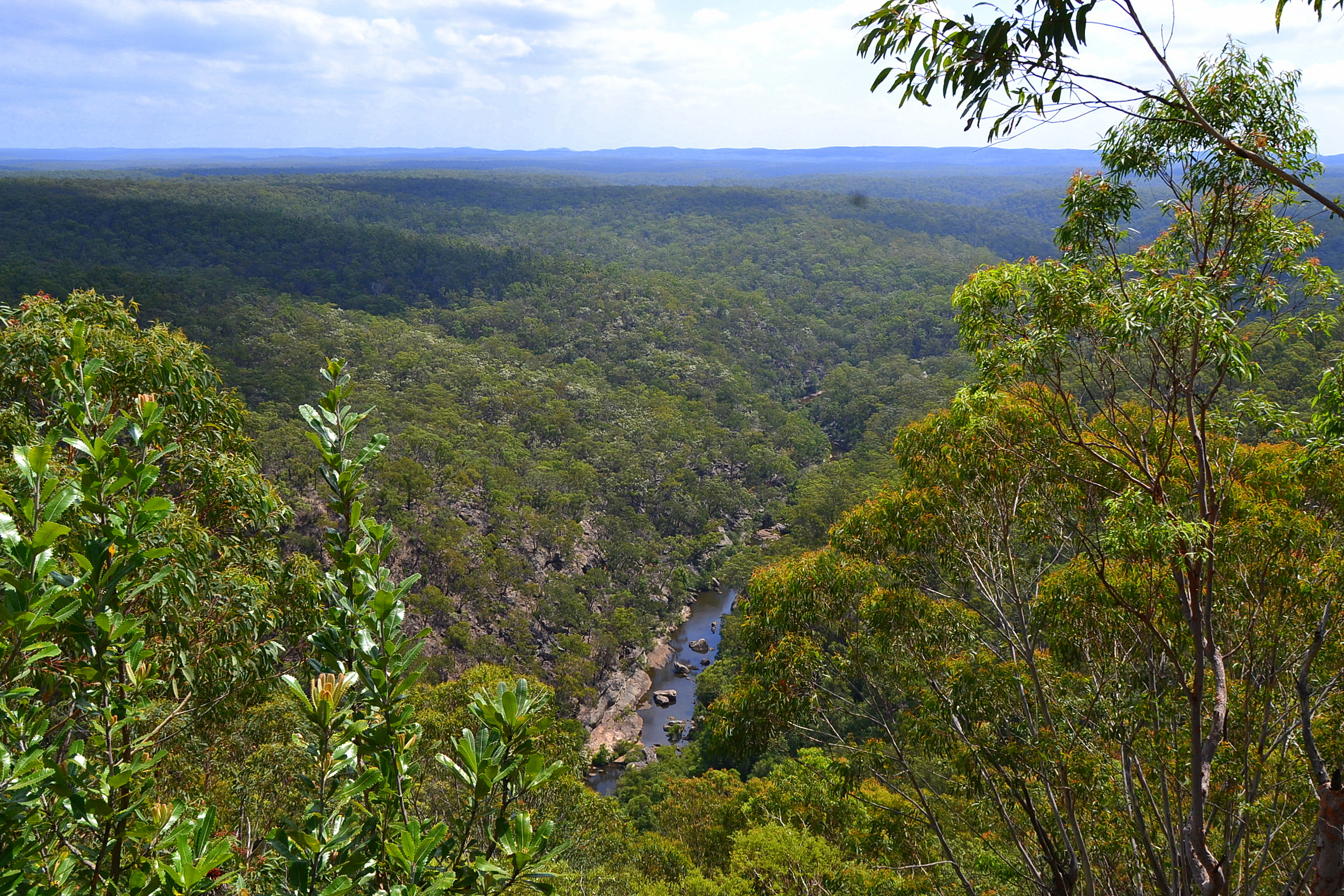
Chalmers Lookout, Glenbrook

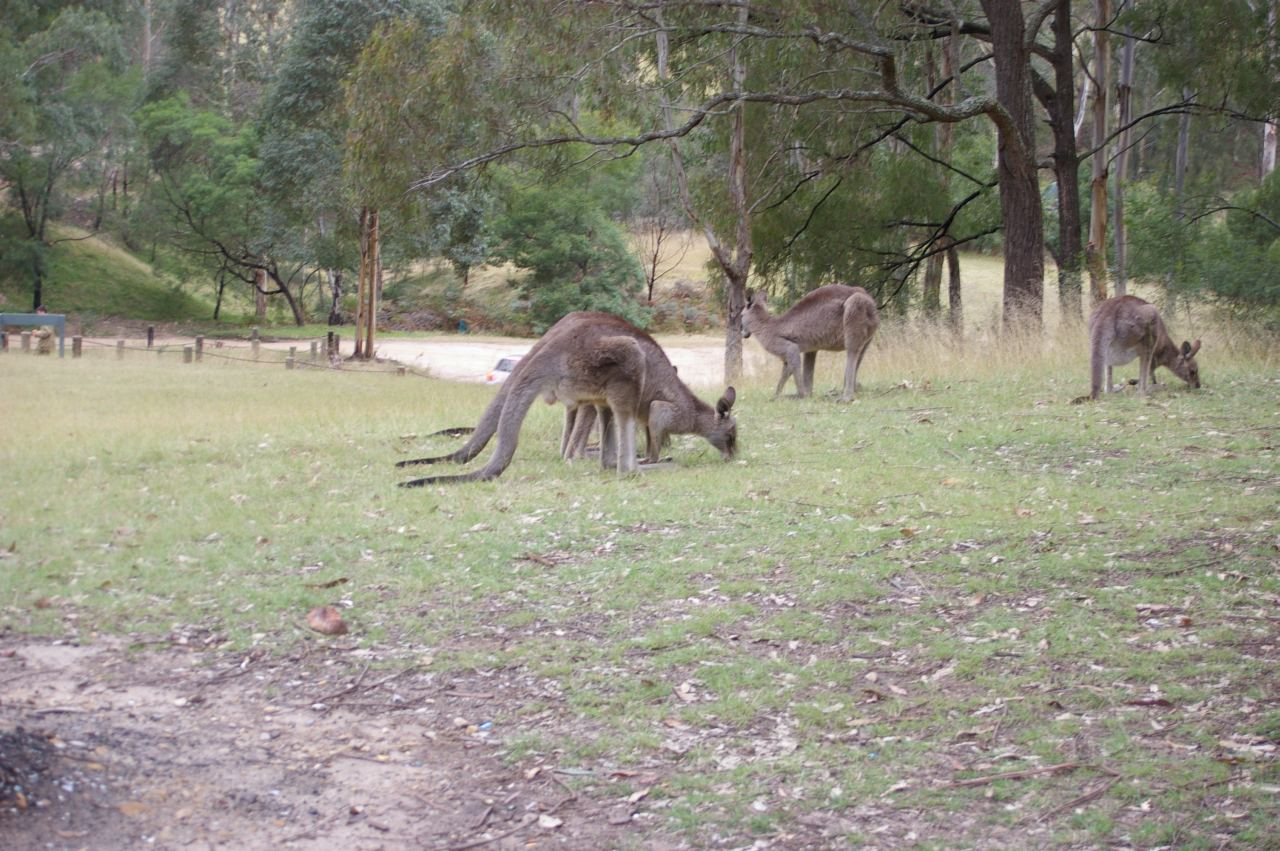
Kangaroos at Euroka Camp Area, Blue Mountains National Park Glenbrook Entrance.

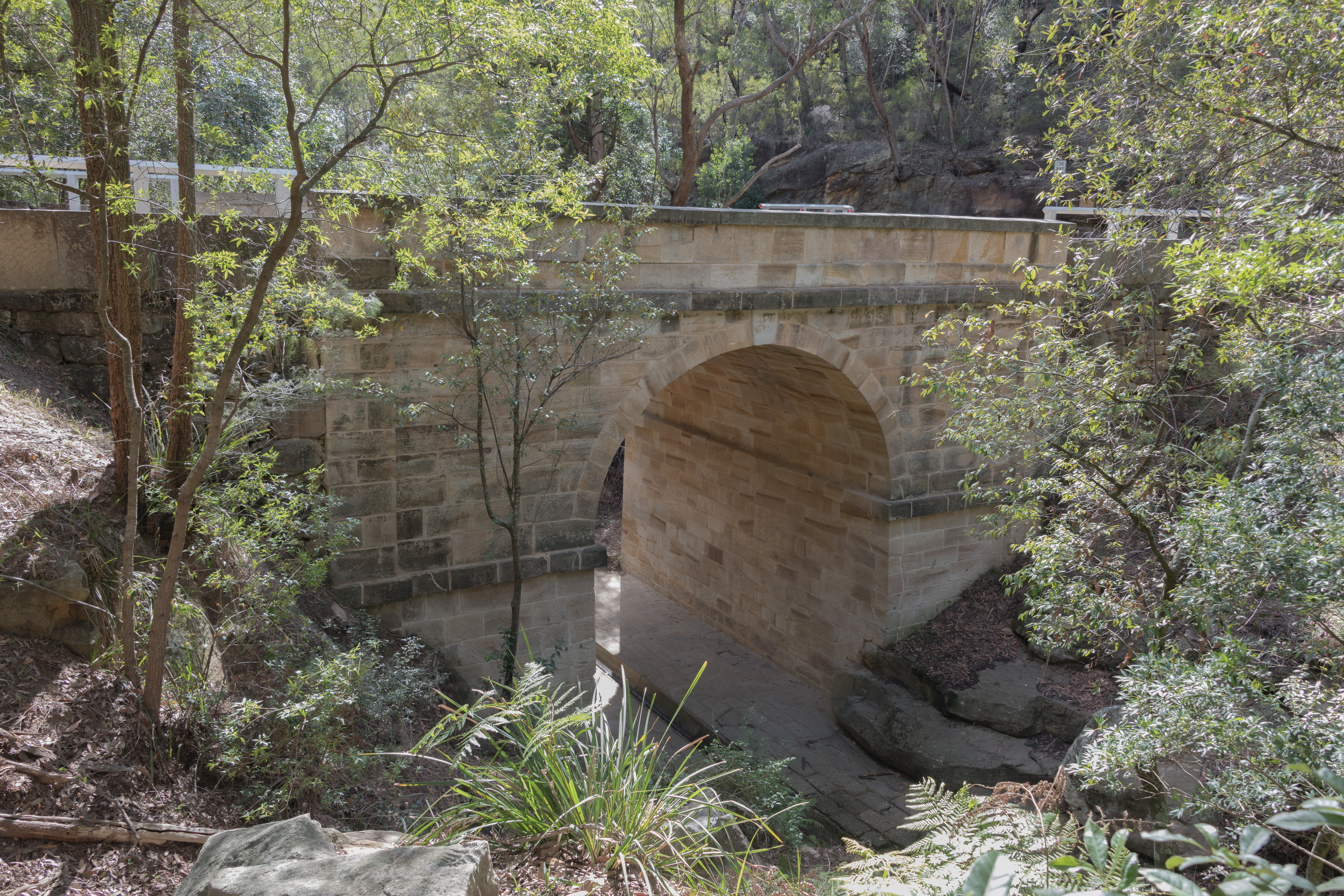
Lennox Bridge, 1833

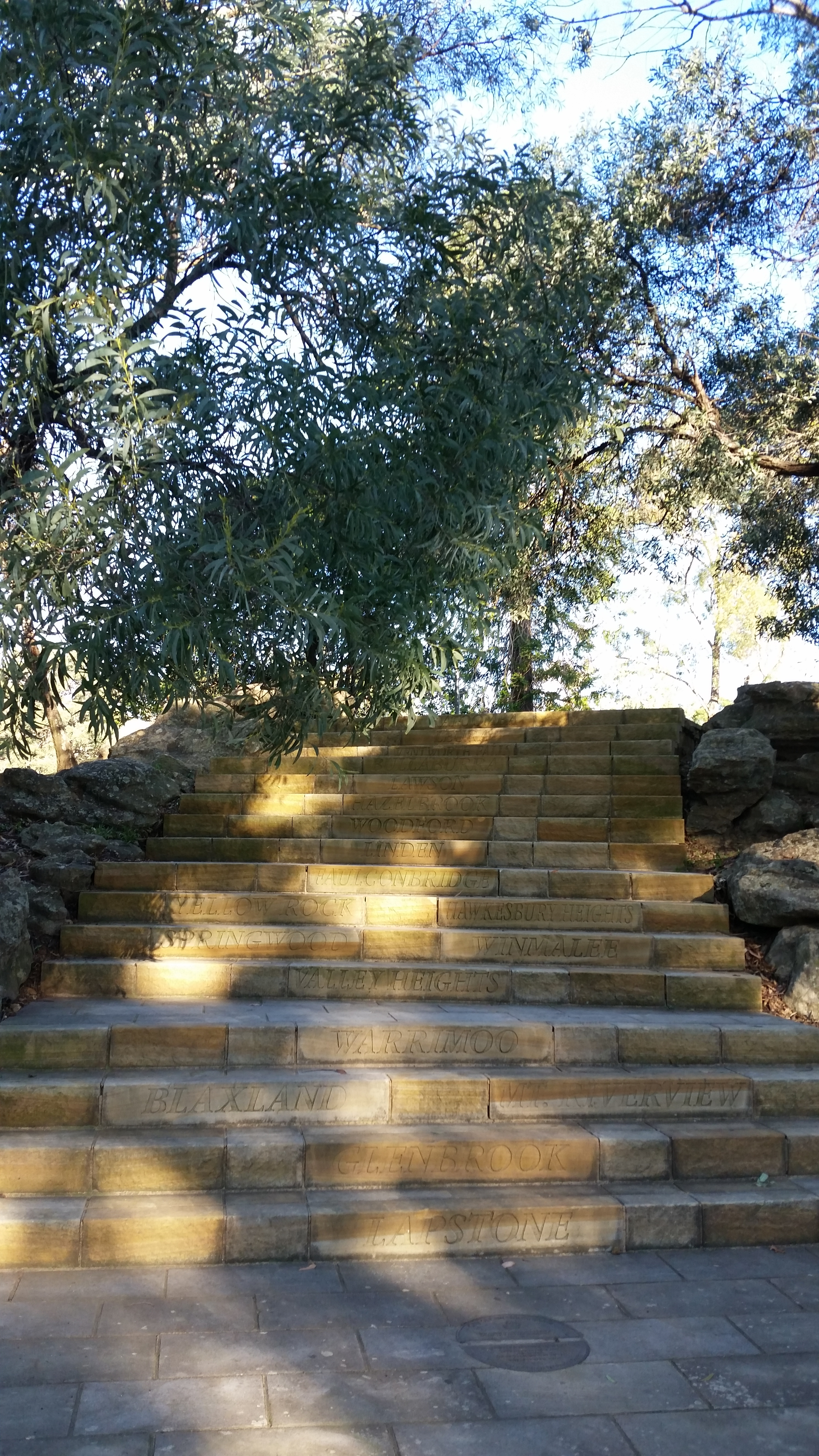
Blue Mountains suburbs staircase

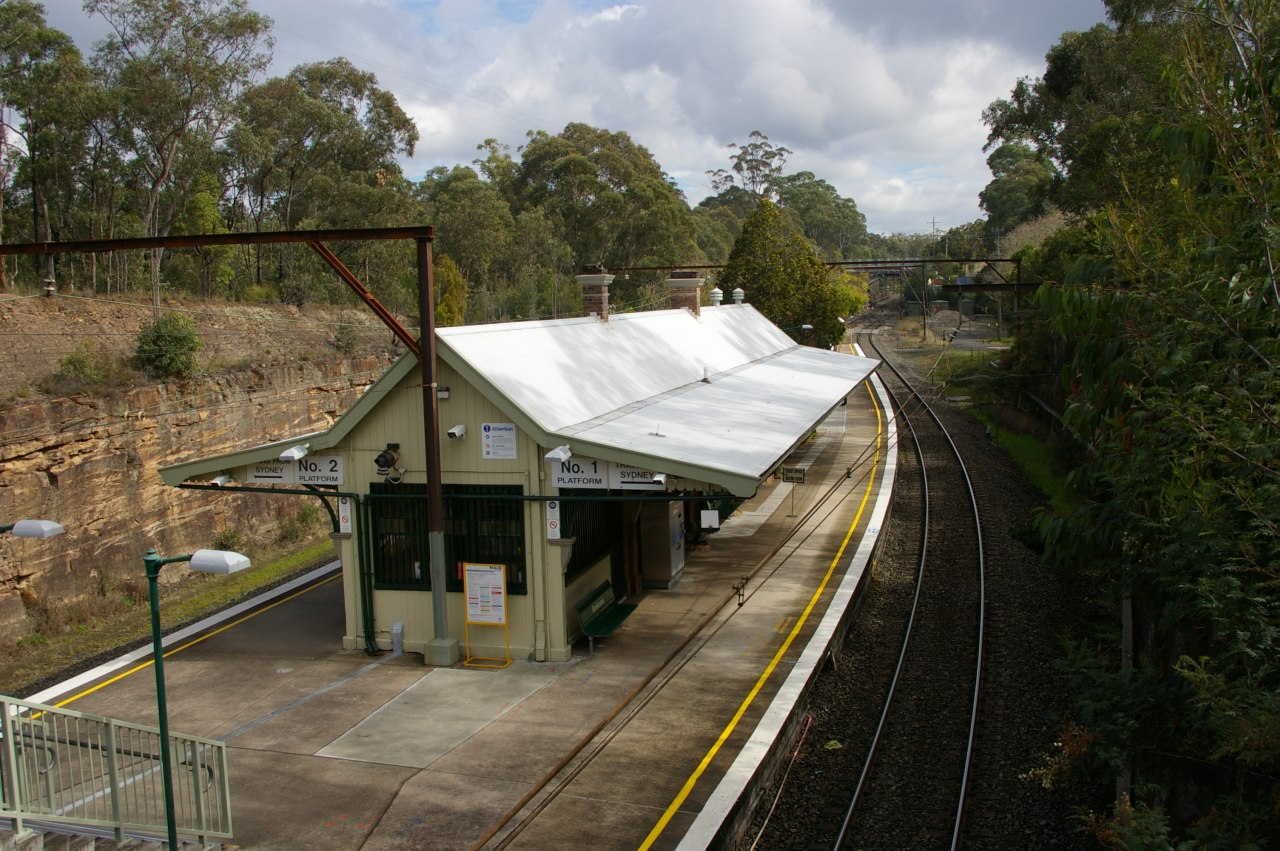
Glenbrook Railway Station

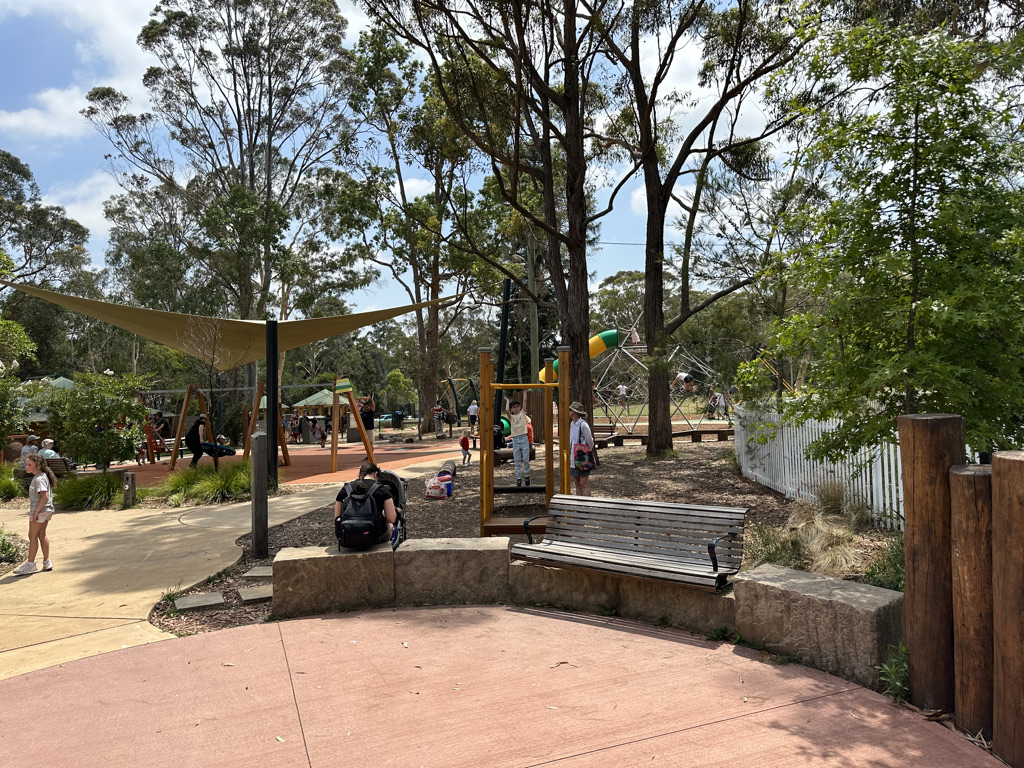
Inside Glenbrook Park

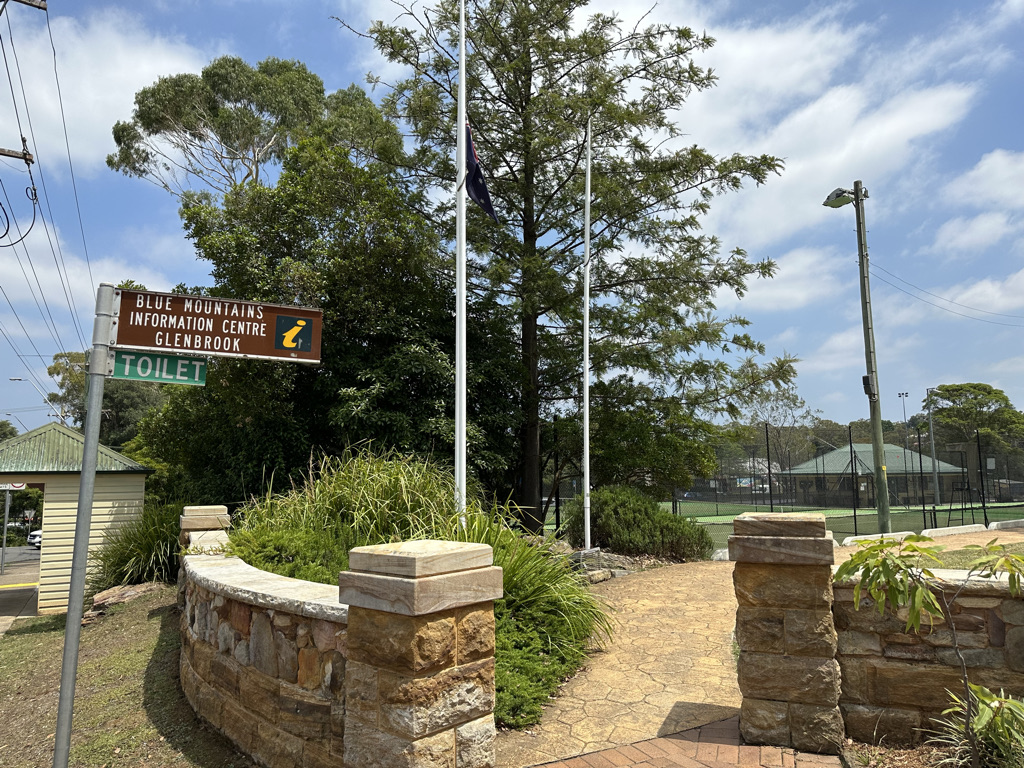
Glenbrook Park entrance

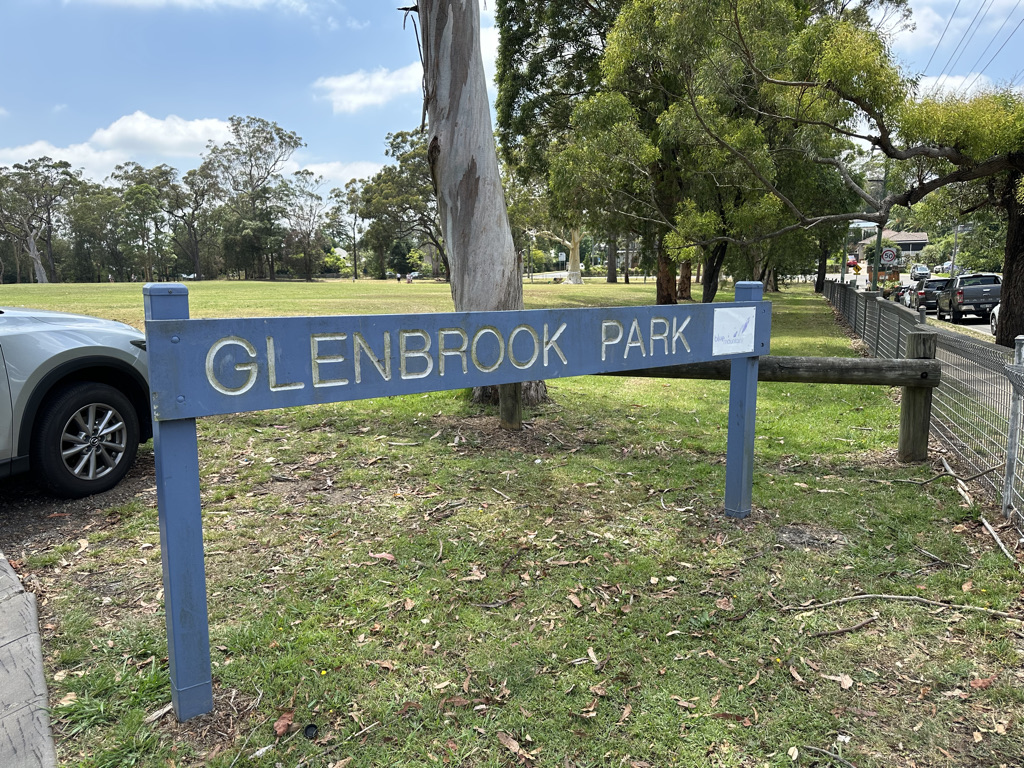
Glenbrook Park Sign

== See also ==
- List of Blue Mountains articles
