= Military Station archaeological site =

Heritage site in Hartley, New South Wales

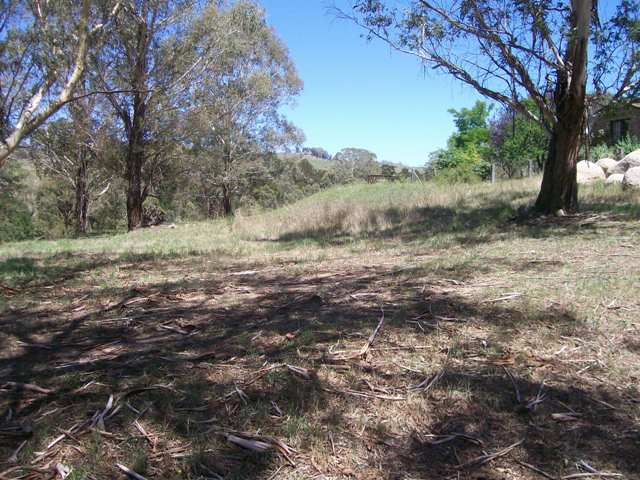
- Site of building platforms

- Location within New South Wales Location within Australia
- 33°32′50″S 150°08′47″E
- Location: 200 Jenolan Caves Road, Hartley, City of Lithgow, New South Wales, Australia

History
- Built: 1815–1832

New South Wales Heritage Register
- Official name: Military Station Archaeological Site and Burial at Glenroy; Cox's River Military Station; Government Provision Depot
- Type: State heritage (archaeological-terrestrial)
- Designated: 1 October 2010
- Reference no.: 1840
- Type: Other – Government & Administration
- Category: Government and Administration
- Builders: Convict labour

The Military Station archaeological site is a heritage-listed former stock station, military station, depot and provision depot and now archaeological site at 200 Jenolan Caves Road, Hartley, City of Lithgow, New South Wales, Australia. It was built from 1815 to 1832 by convict labour. It is also known as Military Station Archaeological Site and Burial at Glenroy, Cox's River Military Station and Government Provision Depot. It was added to the New South Wales State Heritage Register on 1 October 2010.

== History ==
=== Colonial history ===
The military station archaeological site located at Glenroy is located on the traditional lands of the Wiradjuri people. Wiradjuri country is generally defined as the land bordered by the Lachlan, Macquarie and Murrumbidgee rivers in Central New South Wales. The name Wiradjuri means, "people of the three rivers" and traditionally these rivers were the primary source of food for the Wiradjuri people. Lying at the foot of the Sandstone escarpment and on the banks of the River Lett, the Hartley area may be considered a topographic interface between the mountains and the plains that also forms a cultural border between neighbouring Aboriginal groups and languages: the Wiradjuri People and the Gundungurra People. Archaeological evidence suggests that Aboriginal people followed long established routes through the landscape, and generally left the cold highlands for the milder plains during the winter months. Paths between the Coxs River Valley, Megalong Valley and Burragorang are documented in the descriptions of daily life in the Megalong Valley contained in Cullenbenbong and Green Mountains by Bernard O'Reilly. Prior to the arrival of settlers, the Lett Valley provided Aboriginal people with a wide spectrum of bush foods, medicinal plants and campsites on the elevated slopes along the valley sides and ridges. Traps and poisons such as hickory bark were employed to catch or stun the fish and eels in the river. By controlled firing, the understorey of the vegetation was kept open and accessible, as well as encouraging regrowth of new plants, which in turn attracted game. This gave the bushland an open park like quality so much admired by the colonists.

Lachlan Macquarie and his family arrived in Sydney in January 1810 to accept his commission as Governor of New South Wales. Macquarie's first year as governor was considered a success and set the tone and character for the twelve years of Macquarie's administration. He re-organised government departments and created a strong focus on the construction of quality public works using convict labour that transformed Sydney, Parramatta and the new townships, a number of which still exist in the twenty first century. By 1822 Macquarie had listed 265 works of varying scale which had been carried out during his tenure as governor. Other important outcomes of his administration included the opening of a new market-place in Sydney in October 1810 and the first public fair held "by regular authority" at Parramatta in March 1813 . In July 1813 the colony obtained coinage in place of the noted of hand and barter system previously used and at the end of 1816 Macquarie encouraged the creation of the colony's first bank. Macquarie's administration also had particular concern for public morality and his policies concerning the Aboriginal people reflected a humanitarian conscience. Significantly, Macquarie understood that one of the most important issues of the colony was the need to increase agricultural production and livestock. Despite his efforts to encourage farmers to improve their properties alternate spectres of glut and famine continued to threaten the economy during most of his administration.

Exploration of the settlement was another important focus of Macquarie's administration. He encouraged so much exploration that by the time he left the colony the explored area was many times what it had been when he arrived. Macquarie embarked on his first tour of the outlying districts on 6 November 1810. This was the first of a series of tours including two visits to Van Diemen's Land in 1811 and 1821, three to Newcastle, one to Port Macquarie, which he founded in 1821, and one to the Illawarra in 1822.

The news of Blaxland, William Wentworth and Lawson's crossing of the Blue Mountains in 1813 and the prospect this presented for access to new lands was cause for excitement for Macquarie who saw it as a sign of the colony's glorious destiny. However, he knew that for the present, New South Wales was a small convict colony and that this destiny was firmly in the future. The Cumberland Plain was sufficient land for the small colony and enough to govern without extending it further west. In late 1813 Macquarie sent Surveyor George Evans to follow the explorers trail and officially verify, and hopefully improve on their findings. Evans travelled further than Blaxland, Lawson and Wentworth in that he crossed the Great Dividing Range into the interior, founding the O'Connell, Mitchell, Macquarie and Bathurst Plains. Macquarie was extremely pleased at the news of the plains and proposed to build a road to the new country. While some of Macquarie's eagerness can be attributed to his desire to visit the new country, it was also considered necessary to officially claim the region west of the mountains. The construction of Cox's Road would serve this purpose both symbolically and practically in that it laid suitable foundations for later development, and provided a means to take the colony's starving stock to the new country. Macquarie commissioned William Cox to build the new road even before permission had been received from London.

William Cox's road across the Blue Mountains reached the junction of the Lett and Cox's River in December 1814 and crossed the rivers by two bridges. The bridge over the River Lett was built in a day and was a low level bridge 6.7 metres (22 ft) long and 3.9 metres (13 ft) wide. The Cox's River bridge was a larger bridge finished in seven days with side beams made of large felled trees. It was 13.7 metres (45 ft) long with causeways leading to it from the highlands on each side. The latter were filled with stones and covered with earth. Soon after completion of the road Governor and Mrs Macquarie, and a party of servants and dignitaries including: John Thomas Campbell Esquire, Secretary; Captain. H. C. Antill, Major of Brigade; Lieutenant. John Watts, Aid de Camp; William. Redfern Esquire, Assistant. Surgeon; William. Cox Esquire, J. P.; Sir John. Jamison, Knight; John. Oxley Esquire, Surveyor General; James. Meehan, Deputy Surveyor General; George. W. Evans, Deputy Surveyor; J. W. Lewin, Painter & Naturalist journeyed over the Blue Mountains on the new road to visit the newly accessible areas and proclaim the town of Bathurst on 7 May 1815, the first inland town of the colony.

The party departed Sydney in April 1815. On 29 April they reached the westward edge of the Blue Mountains, admiring the mountain pass he called Cox's Pass and the beautiful vale beyond which he named Vale of Clwydd. At the distant end of the vale was Cox's River, also named by Macquarie during this journey. The party proceeded and reached the river at 3pm, stopping to set up camp on the left bank of the westward branch of the river for the next two nights. The site had good grass and water for the cattle travelling with the party. The following day, Sunday 30 April, the entire travelling party was gathered after breakfast for divine service, the first Anglican service west of the Blue Mountains. The remainder of the day was spent resting or leisurely exploring. The party continued its journey to Bathurst on Monday 1 May. The party camped at the site on the return journey, arriving on 13 May. The next day, a Sunday, the party gathered for prayers before spending the day exploring the locality once again.

William Hassall crossed the mountains during the winter of 1815 to inspect the cattle herd that had been fixed to a station at the beginning of the Vale of Clywdd. He found that a number had died. Therefore, he moved the herd to a station more exposed to the morning sun, "a very pleasant hill opposite the bridge" where the Governor had camped. Hassall believed the station to be an excellent stand for oxen, although too hilly for the cows and calves. They could feed on the Vale of Clwydd, including the side towards Mount Blaxland. Hassall and the men accompanying him marked out a place for a yard and huts. By 27 March 1816 Hassall was able to inform the Governor that the men had built an excellent stockyard 75 by 65 metres (83 yd × 72 yd) with a good marking pen and three huts in line with the rear of the stockyard. One was next to the yard 3.7 by 3.4 metres (12 ft × 11 ft) for the stockmen, the middle hut of a similar size for the store and the next 6.1 by 3.0 metres (20 ft × 10 ft) divided into two rooms, one for the soldiers and one for the overseer when he goes to inspect the stock. They were built of split logs and stringy bark shingles. The doors and shutters were made of broad split wood due to being unable to get sawyers to the site to saw boards.

In 1816 the site then known as the Government Provision Depot, was plundered by a group of Aboriginals from the other side of the Blue Mountains and the stockmen driven away. Official records do not indicate that any conflict between Aboriginal people and European expeditions and travellers took place prior to European arrival to survey Cox's Road. As a result of the 1816 incident, Macquarie sent a detachment of men from the 46th Regiment under the command of Sargeant Jeremiah Murphy to go to the depot and remain there to protect the Government stockmen, cattle and provision depot and to keep communication open between the coast and Bathurst. The regiment was instructed to ensure that Aboriginals did not come within 55 metres (60 yd). Permission was given to fire upon the Aboriginals to compel them to leave. If they still refused they were to be taken as prisoners and sent to Parramatta. The lives of all the women and children were to be saved where possible when an attack on "hostile natives" Aboriginals was required. The instructions to Murphy noted that rather than being local, the Aboriginals who had attacked the depot were from the eastern (Sydney) side of the Blue Mountains. It is not revealed which district they came from. No subsequent altercations were recorded at the Depot. These instructions are considered to represent the establishment of military protection at Glenroy.

The 1816 raid coincided with a spate of Aboriginal raids along the Nepean River in the first four months of 1816 and were part of a series of ongoing raids in the Nepean area since 1814. The incident at the depot is believed to be one of only four (recorded) "violent" confrontations west of the Blue Mountains between the opening of Cox's Pass in 1815 and 1822, and possibly the first. Other incidents included the possible killing of an escaped convict (location not recorded), the spearing of one of William Lawson's horses and the killing of Private James King of the 48th Regiment in unknown circumstances. The relative peace ended following the arrival of Governor Brisbane in 1821 in Sydney who, among other things, ended Macquarie's limit on inland settlement and granted settlers large tracts of land around Bathurst, assigning convicts to the settlers to work these lands. The number of sheep and cattle rose from 33,733 to 113,973 between 1821 and 1825 and alienated land increased from 1,020 to 37,084 hectares (2,520 to 91,636 acres) in the same period, placing Wiradjuri land use under threat. Attempts to find compromises failed due to the scale of the encroachment of settlement and raids by Aboriginals escalated from 1822 until 1824. Governor Brisbane declared martial law in the district in August 1824. This lasted several months before a peace was restored and martial law revoked in December 1824. While it is believed that 22 settlers were killed on the Bathurst frontier during this period, the number of Aboriginal deaths remains disputed

In the meantime, the government depot site with its military protection, good grass and water had become appealing as a stopping point for travellers journeying over the Blue Mountains, marking the end of a day's stage in the journey. On 11 April 1817 explorer John Oxley's expedition to the interior pitched tent and camped on the bank of the river for the night and again on the return journey in September. Included in this party was botanist Allan Cunningham. Cunningham would camp at the site again in 1822 and note the changes in the local flora over the intervening years. His observations of the growth of two Grevillia in the vicinity of the camp over the two trips would see him become the first to describe the previously unpublished plants. He described the surrounding land as thinly wooded, the soil generally rich, abundant in good grasses and herbage for grazing herds, and possessing all the ordinary requisites for the establishment of the farmer. He would visit again in the future.

On 7 October 1820 Corporal James Morland gave evidence to Commissioner John Thomas Bigge as part of an inquiry into the state of the Colony of NSW that all men returning from Bathurst were victualled at the depot as were men bringing beef from Bathurst and flour from the Nepean, including the carters. Morland claimed that the huts were badly put up and in constant need of repair. Macquarie visited again in 1821 when making his second tour of Bathurst with Judge Advocate Wylde. He stayed at the same camping place as he had on his first trip. In 1882 one traveller described pitching their group's tent in front of the houses which were inhabited by a corporal and his wife who provided the travellers with a bucket of milk.

In 1824 two French expeditioners Dumont D'Urville and Rene-Primevre Lesson found the site delightful and the surroundings picturesque. At this time the military post held six soldiers and a corporal.

In the mid 1820s the military establishment increased and instructions given for building a log hut 9.1 by 4.6 metres (30 ft × 15 ft) with a partition to accommodate a subaltern officer in 1826. In 1827 the station occupied by a non-commissioned officer and 10–12 men of the 57th regiment. Some travellers found watching the soldiers relaxing on benches outside their neat whitewashed cottage while watching the travellers struggle through the nearby ford disagreeable. One noted that it would only take a short time for some of these men to repair the bridges over the two fords which lay either side of the station but had fallen, requiring horses and their cargo to walk through the rivers.

Some repairs were made at the station and the fords during 1827 and 1828. Lieutenant Henry Shadworth of the 57th regiment was quartered at Cox's River as assistant surveyor of roads. On 11 January 1829 Jane, the wife of Lieutenant Kirkley of the 39th regiment died at the station. In May 1829 Major McPherson, military commandant at Bathurst, was instructed to withdraw the increase of the original cows provided at the station for the military. Road gangs were located in the vicinity of the station in 1830 but were not quartered there. In 1831 orders were given for the repair of the officers' house as it was infested by bugs and vermin. A single remaining headstone of Eliza Rodd dates from this period. She was the child of J Rodd, Colour Sergeant of the 39th regiment.

With the rerouting of the western road in 1831–32 the military station was abandoned and the land sold in 1837 to James Blackett of Sydney. A plan drawn at this time clearly shows four buildings and the outline of a paddock. It is only in 1837 that the name Glenroy appears to have first been used, probably by James Blair, the Scottish magistrate appointed to the area until 1840 when he was transferred to Port Phillip. In the later 1800s William McDermott owned and farmed Glenroy, leasing it in the 1890s to J. H. Luxton who lived in the former officers' quarters and grew potatoes. All the buildings subsequently vanished.

By 1914 the stockade had deteriorated to a place of ruin and desolation. The garden and orchard were overgrown, the fences rotted away and the buildings heaps of rotting timber hidden by weeds and undergrowth. A lone chimney was described as the only remaining, readily identifiable feature in 1914. However, recollections of recent occupants of the site and some early twentieth century descriptions of the site suggest that a hut may have been reconstructed on one of the early building platforms and used during the mid twentieth century. During 1936 a granite monument was erected nearby in commemoration of the Anglican service held there in 1815. The site has continued to remain in private hands, and in 2010 has been owned by the same family for over fifty years with visitor camping and accommodation facilities.

=== Eliza Rodd Grave ===
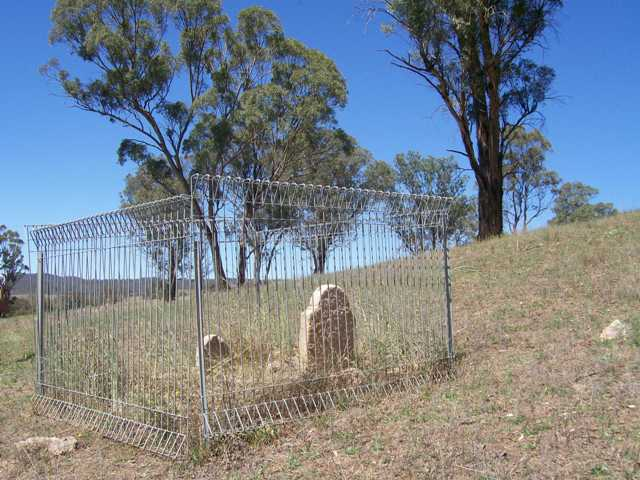
Grave of Eliza Rodd

Eliza Rodd was the daughter of career soldier James Rodd. He fought with the 39th regiment in Canada during the Anglo-American war. The 39th was transferred to France, arriving shortly before the Battle of Waterloo on 18 June 1815. While in France, he married Judith Joseph Baudelet and they had two children. The Regiment was stationed in Ireland from 1819 and then transferred to New South Wales in 1826. James and Judith Rodd brought their son to New South Wales, but left their four-year-old daughter Marie-Anne with her grandparents in Chamblain, France, as she was though too young to make the journey.

James Rodd was initially stationed at Parramatta before being promoted to colour sergeant in 1827 and sent to Bathurst. By 1829 he was in charge of members of the 39th regiment stationed at Glenroy. Eliza Rodd was born on 10 January 1831 and baptised by the Anglican minister at Bathurst. She was the second child born to James and Judith in New South Wales. She died on 14 September 1831.

James Rodd was transferred back to Sydney with his family at the beginning of 1832, leaving a lone grave on a hillside overlooking an idyllic view and marked lovingly with a professionally crafted head and footstones. Judith died at Sydney on 19 April 1832. The 39th Regiment was then transferred to India, taking its colour sergeant and his young sons far from the lone grave at Glenroy. Colour Sergeant James Rodd died in India in December 1832, leaving 13-year-old Ambroise and 6-year-old James, Jr. orphaned.

Restoration work and protection of the infant Eliza Rodd's grave has been an ongoing project of Lithgow Regional Branch since 2007. Repairs and restoration were completed in mid-2009. A photograph taken of the site in the early 1900s shows a wood fence.

== Description ==
The archaeological site is located on the property known as Glenroy on the road to the Jenolan Caves. The property is open and grassy, broken by stands of trees located intermittently on the small hills within the generally sloping nature of the country. Watercourses associated with the Cox's River are located at the bottom of the property where the ground flattens out and small granite boulders become common along the river banks. Early river crossings are evident, including remnants of timber posts and a cutting. Several single storey houses and cottages are scattered around the property, primarily of modern construction in a variety of materials. A house at the entry to the property is likely to be of nineteenth or early twentieth century construction with later additions or alterations.

Eliza Rodd's grave is located towards the centre of the property and consists of a sandstone head and footstone enclosed with pieces of a modern steel fence approximately 130 centimetres (51 in) high. Remains of building platforms are evident in front of the c. 1970s single storey brick house. These are identifiable by flat grassy areas which contradict the natural sloping landform immediately surrounding the site and are located within the approximate location of the buildings shown on an 1837 plan of the site. Part of the driveway traversing along the front of the site has evidence of a variety of small china, earthenware and glass shards, some likely to date from the early to mid nineteenth century. Occupants of the property have noted that these small pieces continue to rise to the surface over time.

=== Condition ===
As at 13 September 2010, much of the archaeological resource is well covered and hidden from view. The site of the four early wooden buildings shown with precision on the 1835 plan is on the terraced hill above Cox's River near the indistinct site of Cox's bridge. Cox's line of road is clear further east, across the River Lett and again on the south side of Cox's River but is not visible at Glenroy, between the original bridges. The opening of the area to picnicking with no controls over the archaeological site poses potential threats. The new house is located close to the rear of the building platforms.

=== Modifications and dates ===
- 1816: first three huts and yard completed
- 1820s: new log hut added
- 1827–1828: repairs – details unknown
- 1831: repairs to officers house
- 1914: site all but disappeared
- late twentieth century: evidence of buildings on site suggest the platforms have been utilised for additional buildings that have also since disappeared
- 1970s: substantial brick house built in close proximity to the military station building site
- 2009: restoration and repair of Eliza Rodd Grave and erection of temporary metal fence to protect grave

== Heritage listing ==
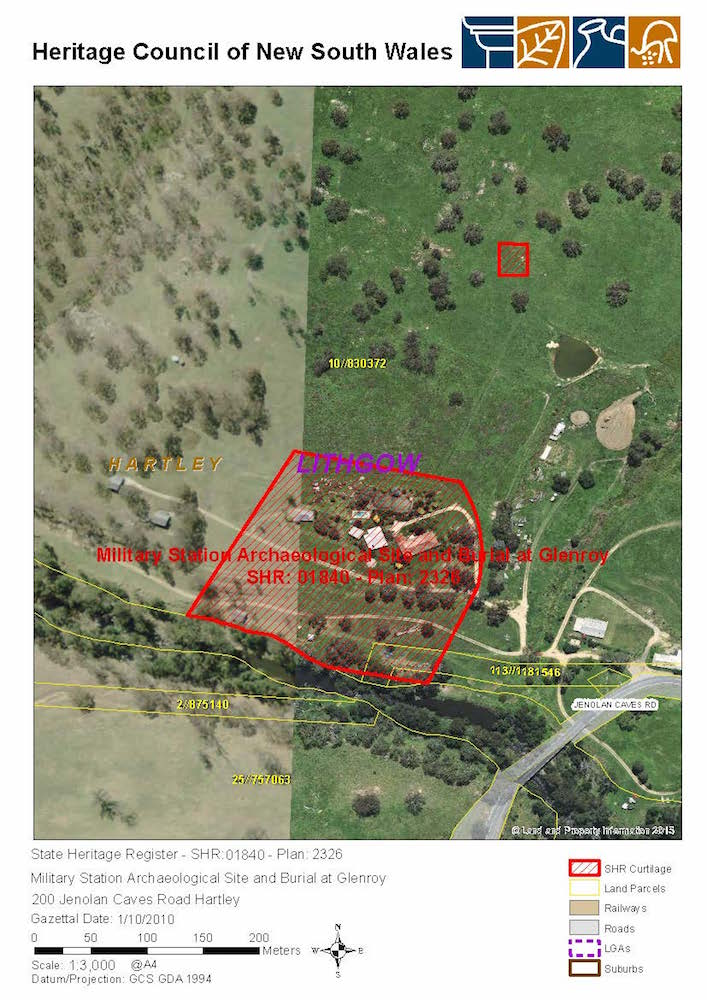
Heritage boundaries

As at 19 May 2010, the military station and burial site and surrounds have high state significance as some of the earliest representation of European incursions into, and claims over the land west of the Blue Mountains for the extension of pastoralism. This activity would eventually displace the local Aboriginal population. The 1816 raid on the provision depot by Aboriginals from the other side of the Blue Mountains resulted in perhaps the first "violent confrontation" between Europeans and Aboriginals west of the Blue Mountains following the opening of Cox's Pass.

The site also represents early government policy to prevent settlement in the locality out of government control. The area has particular significance for the Anglican religion and the Christian community as the location of the first divine service (Anglican) west of the Mountains and for Europeans as the first government provision depot and late military establishment west of the Blue Mountains.

Military Station archaeological site was listed on the New South Wales State Heritage Register on 1 October 2010 having satisfied the following criteria.

The place is important in demonstrating the course, or pattern, of cultural or natural history in New South Wales.

The Glenroy archaeological site has state historic significance as the first military station west of the Blue Mountains and the location of the first Divine (Anglican) Service west of the Blue Mountains. The general area was the main stopping ground for all travellers who had just descended or were about to ascend Cox's Pass, the first being Governor Macquarie and his party in 1815 following construction of Cox's Road.

The station has state significance as the site of one of the earliest recorded conflicts between Europeans and Aboriginals west of the Blue Mountains and as the site of one of only four incidents during the relatively peaceful period in the region between 1815 and 1822 prior to government policy changes and the rise of tensions associated with European settlement. It is the first definable incident.

The place has a strong or special association with a person, or group of persons, of importance of cultural or natural history of New South Wales's history.

The site at Glenroy has significance at a state level for its historical association with the location which Governor Macquarie and his party, (including Mrs Macquarie), stopped to rest on his first tour west of the Blue Mountains following the opening of Cox's Road, as well as during subsequent tours to areas of the colony west of the Blue Mountains. The site has particular associations with the 46th and 39th regiments who were stationed at the post. It also has associations with the many explorers and their parties who not only camped at the site, but were inspired by its beauty and previously unseen flora such as Alan Cunningham and the French explorers Dumont D'Urville and Rene-Primevre Lesson. It has local significance for its association with surveyors James Meehan and John Oxley, two of the colony's most well known surveyors.

The place is important in demonstrating aesthetic characteristics and/or a high degree of creative or technical achievement in New South Wales.

The site and surrounds have state significance for their ability to inspire and impress explorers and travellers to the extent that they felt compelled to discuss its beauty in detail in their writings. It has landmark qualities as the termination point of the fertile and level plains of the Vale of Clwydd so admired by travellers when viewed after descending Cox's Pass. Views between the river and the military station site also contribute to an understanding of the placement of the military station initially for the benefit of stock rearing and preventing uncontrolled expansion of settlement. This was quickly extended to surveillance of the local Aboriginal presence and ensuring communication between Bathurst and the coast remained open.

The place has a strong or special association with a particular community or cultural group in New South Wales for social, cultural or spiritual reasons.

The site and surrounds have state social significance for the Anglican and Christian community as a representation of the spread of the religion west of the Blue Mountains and the importance given to religious observance in the early nineteenth century even when far from civilising influences and places dedicated to worship.

The place has potential to yield information that will contribute to an understanding of the cultural or natural history of New South Wales.

The site has potential to demonstrate the layout of early military/government provision stations west of the Blue Mountains, in particular the first. It has the potential to yield archaeological evidence of the early occupation of the government station and its inhabitants and presents the opportunity to compare differences in layout between more isolated depots and their counterparts closer to established settlements. The opportunity also potentially exists to compare the physical differences between a military station/government depot and a convict stockade. Pottery, glass and china shards may provide evidence of the goods available to the individuals stationed there.

The place possesses uncommon, rare or endangered aspects of the cultural or natural history of New South Wales.

The location is rare at a state level as the site of the first Divine Service (Anglican) west of the Blue Mountains, although the exact spot is unknown. It also has high rarity value as the location of one of the earliest Aboriginal/European conflicts west of the Blue Mountains following the opening of Cox's Road, and one of few to take place prior to 1821.

The place is important in demonstrating the principal characteristics of a class of cultural or natural places/environments in New South Wales.

The site has state significance as one of the earliest areas of European inhabitation west of the Blue Mountains.

== See also ==
- Military history of Australia

== Sources ==
- Bertie, Charles H (1914). Peeps at the Past. Early Australian History.
- Colonial Secretary (1816). Correspondence Rell 6065 4/1798. Instructions to Jeremiah Murphy concerning a detachment of the 46th Regiment 22 April.
- Comber (2009). n.t.
- Connor, John (2002). The Australian Frontier Wars 1788-1838.
- Cserhalmi, Otto; Partners C/L (2002). Hartley Historic Site Conservation Management Plan.
- Havard, H. L.; Bowd, B. T. (1937). "Historic Glenroy, Cox's River".
- Karskens, Grace (1988). An Historical and Archaeological Study of Cox's Road and early Crossings of the Blue Mountains, New South Wales.
- McLachlan, N. D. (1967). "Lachlan Macquarie (1762–1824)". Australian Dictionary of Biography. Vol. 2. National Centre of Biography, Australian National University. ISBN 978-0-522-84459-7. ISSN 1833-7538. OCLC 70677943.
- Osterberg-Olsen, M. (2010). Submission to Heritage Branch - Military Station Archaeological site at Glenroy.
- Thomson, Kathleen (1966). "James Blair (1813–1880)". Australian Dictionary of Biography. Vol. 1. National Centre of Biography, Australian National University. ISBN 978-0-522-84459-7. ISSN 1833-7538. OCLC 70677943.
- "Military Station Archaeological Site and Burial at Glenroy". New South Wales State Heritage Register. Department of Planning and Environment. H01840. Text is licensed by State of New South Wales (Department of Planning and Environment) under CC BY 4.0 licence.
