= Old Government Cottages Group, Bathurst =

Old Government Cottages
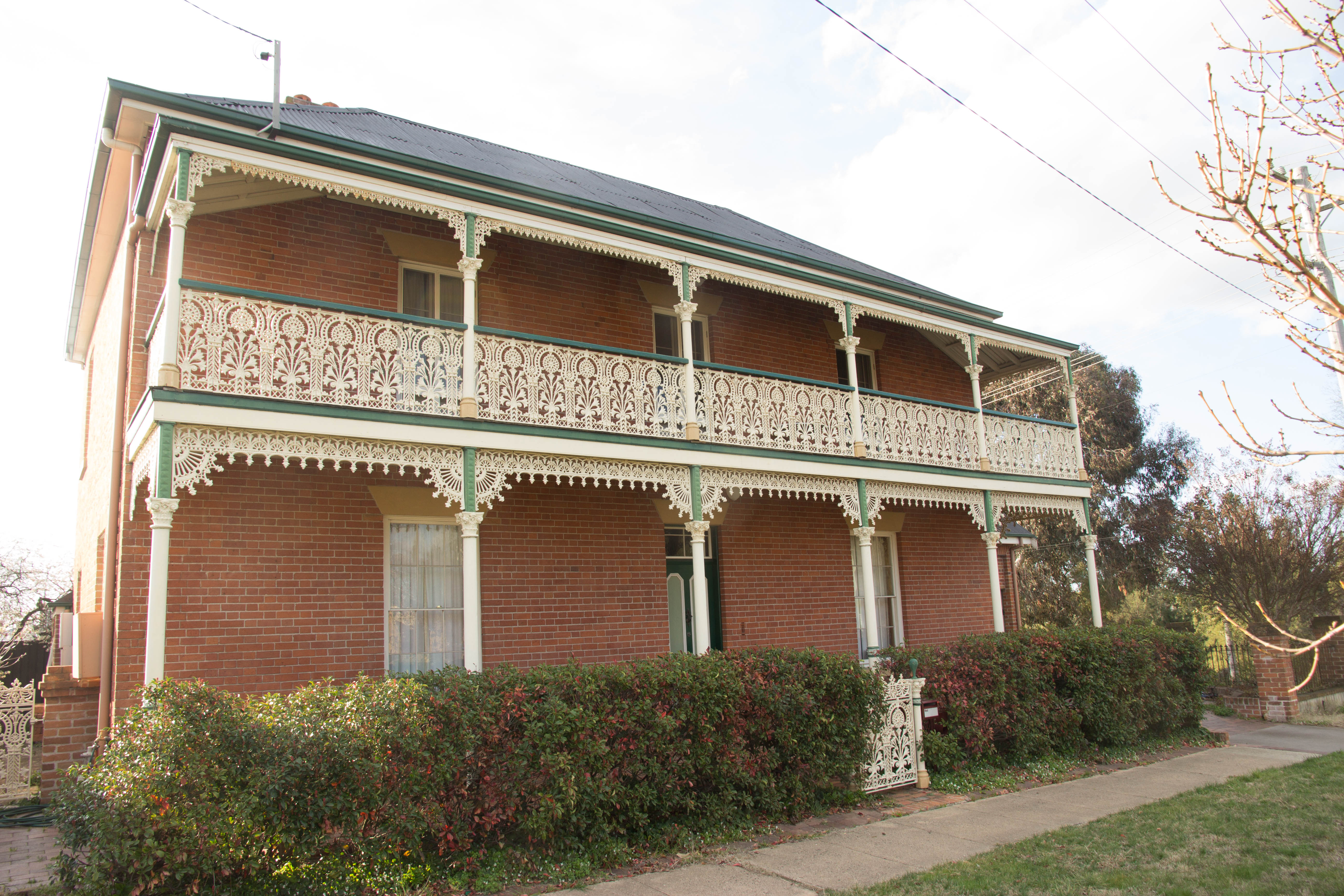
- Macquarie House, located at 1 George Street

- Location within New South Wales Location within Australia
- 33°24′44″S 149°35′04″E
- Location: 16 Stanley Street, Bathurst, Bathurst Region, New South Wales, Australia

History
- Built: 1837–1860

Site notes
- Architectural styles: Victorian Filigree (1 George Street)
- Owner: Bathurst Regional Council

New South Wales Heritage Register
- Official name: Old Government Cottages Group; 'Old Government House'; Macquarie House; Miss Falloon's cottage; John Ford's house
- Type: State heritage (complex / group)
- Designated: 21 February 2003
- Reference no.: 1659
- Type: Government House
- Category: Government and Administration

The Old Government Cottages Group consists of two heritage-listed houses at 16 Stanley Street and 1 George Street, Bathurst, Bathurst Region, New South Wales, Australia. The group was built from 1837 to 1860. The buildings are also known as 'Old Government House', Macquarie House, Miss Falloon's cottage and John Ford's house. The property is owned by Bathurst Regional Council. It was added to the New South Wales State Heritage Register on 21 February 2003.

== History ==
=== Aboriginal people and colonisation ===
Aboriginal occupation of the Blue Mountains area dates back at least 12,000 years and appears to have intensified some 3000–4000 years ago. In pre-colonial times the area now known as Bathurst was inhabited by Aboriginal people of the Wiradjuri linguistic group. The clan associated with Bathurst occupied on a seasonal basis most of the Macquarie River area. They moved regularly in small groups but preferred the open land and used the waterways for a variety of food. There are numerous river flats where debris from recurrent camps accumulated over a long period. European settlement in this region after the first documented white expedition west of the Blue Mountains in 1813 was tentative because of apprehensions about resistance from Aboriginal people. There was some contact, witnessed by sporadic hostility and by the quantity of surviving artefacts manufactured by the Aborigines from European glass. By 1840 there was widespread dislocation of Aboriginal culture, aggravated after 1850 by the goldrush to the region.

Prior to European settlement in Australia, the Wiradjuri Aboriginal group lived in the upper Macquarie Valley. Bathurst was proclaimed a town by Lachlan Macquarie on 7 May 1815, named after Lord Bathurst, Principal Secretary of State for the Colonies. Bathurst is Australia's oldest inland township.

=== Bathurst ===
Governor Macquarie chose the site of the future town of Bathurst on 7 May 1815 during his tour over the Blue Mountains, on the road already completed by convict labour supervised by William Cox. Macquarie marked out the boundaries near the depot established by surveyor George Evans and reserved a site for a government house and domain. Reluctant to open the rich Bathurst Plains to a large settlement, Macquarie authorised few grants there initially, one of the first being 1000 acres to William Lawson, one of the three European explorers who crossed the mountains in 1813. The road-maker William Cox was another early grantee but later had to move his establishment to Kelso on the non-government side of the Macquarie River.

A modest release of land in February 1818 occurred when ten men were chosen to take up 20-hectare (50-acre) farms and zero-point-eight-one-hectare (two-acre) town allotments across the river from the government buildings. When corruption by government supervisor Richard Lewis and acting Commandant William Cox caused their dismissal, they were replaced by Lieutenant William Lawson who became Commandant of the settlement in 1818.

Macquarie continued to restrict Bathurst settlement and reserved all land on the south side of the Macquarie River for government buildings and stock, a situation that prevailed until 1826. In December 1819 Bathurst had a population of only 120 people in 30 houses, two thirds being in the township of Kelso on the eastern side of the river and the remainder scattered on rural landholdings nearby. The official report in 1820 numbered Bathurst settlers at 114, including only 14 women and 15 children. The government buildings comprised a brick house for the commandant, brick barracks for the military detachment and houses for the stock keeper, and log houses for the 50 convicts who worked the government farm. Never successful, the government farm was closed by Governor Darling in 1828.

Governor Darling, arriving in Sydney in 1825, promptly commenced a review of colonial administration and subsequently introduced vigorous reforms. On advice from Viscount Goderich, Darling divided colonial expenditure into two parts: one to cover civil administration, funded by New South Wales; the other for the convict system, funded by Britain.

By this time, J. McBrien and Robert Hoddle had surveyed the existing grants in the vicinity. Surveyor James Bym Richards began work on the south side of the river in 1826. But the town was apparently designed by Thomas Mitchell in 1830 and did not open until late 1833 after Richards had completed the layout of the streets with their two-road allotments. The first sales were held in 1831 before the survey was complete.

In 1832 the new Governor, Major General Sir Richard Bourke, visited Bathurst in October. He instructed the Surveyor General Major Thomas L. Mitchell to make arrangements for "opening the town of Bathurst without delay" and he in turn instructed the Assistant Surveyor at Bathurst J. B. Richards to lay out the blocks and streets. This was done in September 1833. It is believed that Major Mitchell named the streets, with George Street being named after King George III.

=== Old Government Cottages Group ===
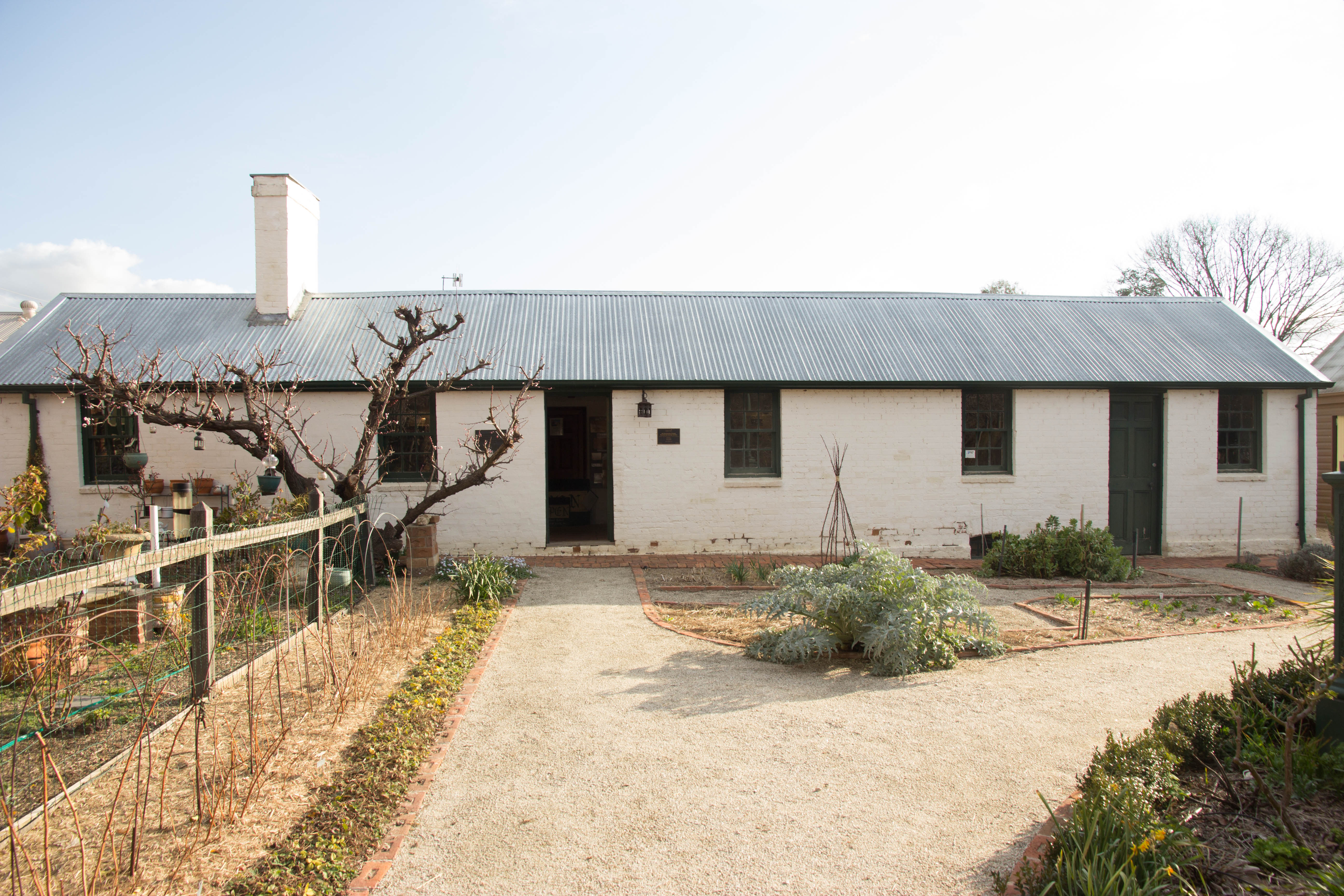
The cottages that may have faced Stanley Street, Bathurst.

The land on which this building group stands, on the corner of George and Stanley streets, originally surveyed as Lot 6, was set aside as a government reserve until it was sold to James William Bligh, a solicitor in 1847. The purchase price for Lot 6 was £10, while its neighbour Lot 7 was £7.

Bligh, who lived in Bathurst from 1841 to 1851, was presumably a speculator in land. It is supposed that an existing dwelling may have existed then on this site, and part of that building has come to be popularly known as "Government cottage", having been built on Government land while it was still in their control. (i.e. pre 1847). However, there is no direct evidence to support this proposition. No building is shown on this site on a Government Survey of 1833, which did show all other "government buildings" of the time. The purchase price of £7 does not indicate an "improvement" of any consequence on the land. However one old brick at No. 1 George Street embedded into the wall is dated "AD 1827", and this may relate to some earlier structure, or the construction of the cottage, or both.

James William Bligh however probably did not build on the land but sold it on to Miss Falloon, who had been living in the Government House at this time. She ran a small home school at the time. She may have built or improved the cottage known as No 16 Stanley St. She then sold the property to Mr John Ford in 1857. Mr. John Ford of Kelso, "a banker and coach proprietor", who had a run of coaches, was possibly also the same John Ford who owned a steam flour mill in Kelso in 1851.

John Ford built the two storied house in 1859/60, probably with the cottage at the rear serving as kitchen and servants quarters. By 1862 he was registered as a resident in that area of Bathurst.

In 1875 the 2 storied house was owned by John Gardiner, and then sold to John Ford junior in 1883–84. From 1884 to 1887 Macquarie House (as it was then known), served as one of the ladies colleges of Bathurst.

Bathurst High School started operating in 1884 first only as a boys school, and then as a boys and girls section from 1885, but by 1887 it was forced to close due to lack of students. This may have been because of rival schools including the "Pixie Ladies College", in Upper William Street under the direction of Miss Keyes, and this establishment of Macquarie House for Young Ladies under the direction of Mrs. Mackenzie.

John Ford Junior died in 1890 and is buried at Kelso cemetery. The house then passed to Alfred Gordon Thomson, who died 6 July 1908, who left it to his heir Minna Augusta Thompson who sold to Charles William Griffin of Granville for £720.

At this stage the description of the house containing thirteen rooms clearly indicates that the "old government cottage" formed part of the premises.

On 20 April 1918 the local Bathurst paper has an advertisement for a property. This advert appears to refer to No 1 George Street and 16 Stanley street, which described it as a 'fine two storied brick residence, with verandahs and balcony, built at the rear of "old Government House" and with "a 99 foot frontage to George Street, and opposite the Ordinance Ground" advertised "on account J.B.Richards". (What was meant by "at the rear of Govt house" is not entirely clear, but the actual Govt house is shown on the 1833 surveys as east of this site and would probably have addressed itself to the East, leaving this house 'at the rear').

In 1964 No 1 George Street was bought by the Bathurst City Council and given to the Bathurst Historical Society. It was stated in an article by Mrs J. Rutherford in the Bathurst Historical Society's 1968 Annual Magazine that No 1 George St then 'consisted of two parts: the two storey section still known today as No.1 George St, and the single storeyed wing behind being described as "the only remaining building authorised by Governor Macquarie".

In 1972 with Dr. Brookmore at the head of the Historical Society, major restoration was undertaken at the cottage by builders from Penrith and furnishing of the cottage in "period" style.

A number of subdivisions of the original Lot have occurred, breaking the original Lot 6 now into six separate portions. A further subdivision in 1989 separated the single storied cottage and the 2 storied house onto separate lots as 16 Stanley Street and 1 George Street respectively.

In 2015 a "period" garden was reinstated using plants known from the colonial era to better present the cottage to visitors. This project was undertaken as part of Bathurst's bicentennial celebrations.

== Description ==
This group consists of no 1 George street, also known as Macquarie house, and "Old Government House" (16 Stanley Street) . Both buildings are situated within the Bathurst General Conservation Area and both are also separately listed on Bathurst LEP. The old government cottage possibly pre-dates No 1 George street, although for most of their existence they have formed one house, with the cottage serving as kitchen, store and servants area to the main residence of No 1 George Street.

No 1 George street is a two-storey full brick building with a hipped, corrugated iron lined roof.(originally shingle lined). A separate hipped roof extends across the full front (east) of the house, supported on caste iron columns, with lace balustrade, brackets and frieze lacework in a two-storey verandah. The facade is symmetrical, except for the 2000 addition to the north containing a car garage. On the ground floor a central elaborate entry door is flanked on each side by a single double hung window. Above the facade contains three sets of French doors providing access to the verandah.

The cottage behind consists of a single storey full brick building, with gable ended roof now clad in shingles (c. 1972). The cottage faces Stanley Street, which appears older that No 1 George street in style and materials, contains a number of well spaced double hung multi paned windows and panelled timber doors. The plan consists of 4 rooms, three of these interconnected. Originally, according to earlier survey plans and sewerage diagrams, the cottage was larger and extended across what is now the southern boundary.

As at 10 July 2015, No. 1 George Street was reported to be in excellent condition, while No. 16 Stanley Street was in fair condition.

The Old Government Cottages Group retains its ability to demonstrate the reasons for its significance, and therefore its integrity

The original fence, which was part ornate iron railings, and part picket fence, is entirely missing except for the front gate. The intention is to reinstate with similar or sympathetic materials.

== Heritage listing ==
One of the oldest brick building groups west of the Macquarie River, the group is situated on the original Government Grounds, adjacent to the Government Convict Gardens. This group is important for its associations with significant early Bathurst figures such as James William Bligh.

No 16 Stanley Street is physically the older building of the two, and could have been constructed in the government era, possibly as early as 1837 under Governor Bourke. No 1 George Street (or Macquarie House) is also important for its architectural qualities, with its ornate iron decoration to the verandah which reflects the key characteristics of Victorian filigree style.

The group, in addition to its historical and architectural qualities, is located on a corner site overlooking the Macquarie River and with the nineteenth century styling of its buildings, represents a landmark element in the streetscape of this old quarter of Bathurst (HO)

Old Government Cottages was listed on the New South Wales State Heritage Register on 21 February 2003 having satisfied the following criteria.

The place is important in demonstrating the course, or pattern, of cultural or natural history in New South Wales.

Old Government Cottages group is of state historical significance because of its close associations with the foundation of Bathurst (Australia's first inland town) as a centre for governing the western districts of the colony of New South Wales, and as one of the oldest surviving buildings west of the Macquarie River located on the original government reserve in Bathurst.

The place has a strong or special association with a person, or group of persons, of importance of cultural or natural history of New South Wales's history.

Old Government Cottages Group has significant local associations with John Ford, James William Bligh and Miss Keyes.

The place is important in demonstrating aesthetic characteristics and/or a high degree of creative or technical achievement in New South Wales.

Old Government Cottages Group is of local aesthetic significance for its prominent siting overlooking the Macquarie River and its contribution to the colonial character of this old quarter of Bathurst.

The place has strong or special association with a particular community or cultural group in New South Wales for social, cultural or spiritual reasons.

Old Government Cottages Group is of local significance for the esteem in which it is held by the local community as a museum of local history and as a place that visually connects the community to the foundation of the town.

The place has potential to yield information that will contribute to an understanding of the cultural or natural history of New South Wales.

Old Government Cottages Group is of state significance as a surviving example of old colonial brick construction in the west of New South Wales, and for the archaeological potential of demolished portions of the oldest cottage and its grounds.

The place possesses uncommon, rare or endangered aspects of the cultural or natural history of New South Wales.

Old Government Cottages Group, especially 16 Stanley Street, is rare at the state level as an example of old colonial brick construction west of the Macquarie River

The place is important in demonstrating the principal characteristics of a class of cultural or natural places/environments in New South Wales.

Old Government Cottages Group, especially 1 George Street, is representative of Victorian domestic housing that reflects growth and change over time in response to changing residential needs.
