= Hartley historic site =

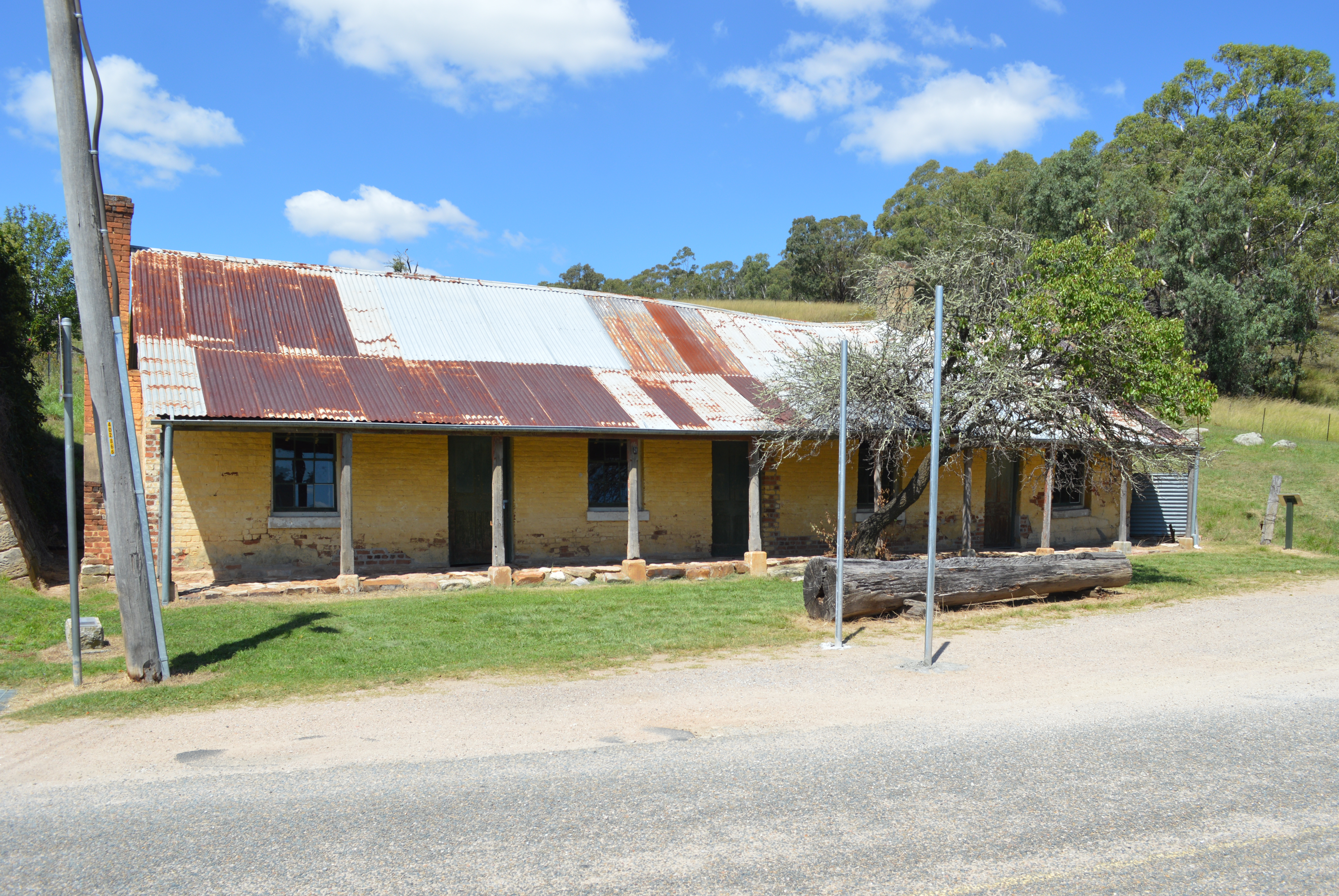
- The Shamrock Inn, built c. 1842, pictured in 2015.

- Location within New South Wales Location within Australia
- 33°32′41″S 150°10′30″E
- Location: Great Western Highway, Hartley, City of Lithgow, New South Wales, Australia

History
- Built: 1837–1850

Site notes
- Owner: Office of Environment and Heritage

New South Wales Heritage Register
- Official name: Hartley Historic Site; Hartley Township
- Type: State heritage (complex / group)
- Designated: 2 April 1999
- Reference no.: 992
- Type: Townscape
- Category: Urban Area

Hartley historic site is a heritage-listed historic village located west of the Blue Mountains along the Great Western Highway at Hartley, New South Wales, Australia. It was built from 1837 to 1850. It is also known as Hartley Historic Site and Hartley Township. The property is owned by the state government and protected by Office of Environment and Heritage. It was added to the New South Wales State Heritage Register on 2 April 1999.

== History ==
The Hartley Valley was first crossed by Europeans during Blaxland, Wentworth and Lawson's famous expedition of 1813. Settlement of the region extended during the 1820s and in 1832 Major Mitchell's new line of western road down Victoria Pass took the Bathurst Road through the Hartley area. Soon a town was proposed and, with large numbers of convicts working in the area, the need for a government detention and judicial centre was recognised (at that time no such place existed in all the country between the Nepean River and Bathurst). Consequently in 1837 a courthouse was erected at Hartley and the following year the town plan was gazetted. Hartley grew as both a government administrative centre and also as a wayside service centre, it being an important stopping point on the western road to Bathurst and further inland.

The railway arrived in the region late in the 1860s and while it led to the growth of places like Lithgow, Hartley declined owing to the reduction in road traffic. Late in the nineteenth century Hartley began to be recognised as a place of historic attraction and the village began to prosper also as a result of the passing tourist traffic to Jenolan Caves. During the interwar period motor car tourism played a particularly significant part in Hartley's history. After the World War II, however, improvements in vehicles and the highway saw a decline as increasing numbers of tourists travelled through town without stopping. During the 1960s and 1970s Blaxland Shire Council acquired many Hartley buildings. In 1972 the Hartley Historic Site was declared under the administration of the National Parks and Wildlife Service.

=== Structures on the historic site ===
The courthouse was designed by Colonial Architect, Mortimer Lewis in 1837.

St John's Anglican Church, built in 1858–59, was designed by leading Colonial Ecclesiastical Architect, Edmund Blacket.

St Bernard's Catholic Church, c. 1842, and the adjacent presbytery, c. 1858-61, reflect Hartley's substantial Irish population in the nineteenth century. The church, Gothic in style, was designed by Alexander Binning. The first mass celebrated in Hartley was by the Rev. Michael Cavanagh, who decided in 1838 that a church should be built to serve the large population of Irish Catholic settlers in the area. Its first priest was Father Dunphy, appointed in 1843.

The Royal Hotel dates from the late 1840s and at one time functioned as the Anglican Rectory and as a school. An NPWS post-card states it was built in 1846 and first licensed as the "Hartley" Hotel by James Nairn. In the 1850s-70s it served as a Cobb & Co staging post for coaches en route between Sydney, Bathurst and Mudgee.

Farmers Inn was built by John Finn around 1845–46. The Finn family was significant in Hartley's history, for the family also built the post office (which family members ran for fifty eight years), Ivy Cottage and Old Tralee. Farmers Inn was licensed from about the 1860s until 1895.

The Shamrock Inn was built in the mid 1840s and occupied as a residence by the Phillips family for a lengthy period. It catered for the needs of the men and women en route to and from the gold fields of Hill End, Sofala and the Turon workings.

Hartley's former post office was constructed between 1845 and 1852. When the building closed in 1982 it was said to be the longest operating post office in Australia.

Old Tralee, named after the Finns' family home in Ireland, was erected between 1846 and 1854. In 1839 John and Mary Finn and their eight children arrived in Australia from Ireland. They set out straight away for Hartley, where they built Old Tralee. Their home town rector had no doubt encouraged their migration with news of his son's progress as Magistrate in Hartley.

In 2016 St. Bernard's Presbytery, after major internal restoration now hosts overnight stay guests, along with nearby Old Tralee, for the first time.

== Description ==
Hartley historic site is located on a steep slope above the River Lett. The immediate surrounding country is cleared though the higher country above is timbered. A range of exotic trees are found in the town. The village with its pervasive nineteenth century character has strong aesthetic qualities.

Today Hartley remains as a highly intact nineteenth century village. Hartley consists of a fine array of government, church, hotel and residential buildings, displaying a range of forms, materials and styles (several of the following are registered individually).

The Courthouse

Built 1837 in sandstone and a very good example of Old Colonial Greek architectural style, designed by Colonial Architect Mortimer Lewis. Its facade is dominated by its pedimented entrance porch with pilasters and columns.

St John's Anglican Church

Built c. 1858–59 in Victorian Gothic style. A modest yet harmonious church, St John's is built of sandstone and the roof, originally shingle (as were most in the village), is clad with corrugated iron. (privately owned)

St Bernard's Catholic Church

Built c. 1842 is Gothic in style and built of sandstone. Windows are paired lancets with stone mullions. The presbytery is built of sandstone and granite and is single storey on an above ground basement, with a steeply pitched hipped roof. Fluted timber posts support the verandah roof and carved stone pilasters flank the French doors and main front door.

St. Bernard's Presbytery

Built c. 1845 of sandstone in the Georgian style.

The Royal Hotel

Built in 1846 as a single storey, Victorian Georgian hotel of sandstone and the attic floor has several dormers. Fluted timber posts (paired either side of the main door) support the verandah.

Farmers Inn

Built c. 1843 is a single storey, roughcast rendered brick building with a gable and skillion roof, and a verandah with end rooms (which were fairly typical of early inns).

The Shamrock Inn

Built c. 1842 in three stages, the former inn reflects several vernacular building techniques. External walls are brick and there is a slab skillion at the rear. Internal walls are slab and some have lathe and plaster or hessian lining. Original shingles remain under the corrugated iron on both the verandah and main gabled roofs. The verandah also features some pitsawn timber.

Hartley's former post office

Built 1846, consists of a central gabled rendered brick section with skillion wings at either end.

Old Tralee

Built 1846–54 has brick walls, a hipped iron roof (with shingles beneath) and various pit sawn timbers.

Ivy Cottage

Dates from some time between the late 1850s and the early 1870s. Standing on a granite rubble footing, the cottage has brick walls, sandstone front steps, a verandah and a shallow pitched roof which is gabled at the front.

Brick toilet

Built c. 1850s of brick in vernacular style.

Woolshed

Built c. 1870s of galvanised iron and timber in vernacular style

Corney/Morgan garage

Built c. 1945 with modern asbestos cement and galanised iron.

Timber cottage

Built c. 1930s of rustic timber.

Concrete block cottage

Built c. 1930s of rustic concrete block construction

Garage residence

Built 1920s in timber vernacular style.

== Heritage listing ==
As at 7 April 2015, Hartley is historically highly significant for its close association with early settlement west of the Blue Mountains, for its role as an early government administrative centre and for its having been a wayside service centre over a lengthy period. The village has an extremely high level of intactness and it contains a rich range of building forms, materials and architectural styles. Having been recognised for many years as a place of historical importance, Hartley has significant social associations among the travelling public. Hartley contains good examples of the work of important colonial era architects, Mortimer Lewis and Edmund Blacket. Owing to the form, materials, styles and alignments of its various buildings and its rural setting above the River Lett, Hartley with its pervasive mid nineteenth century character has significant aesthetic qualities.

Hartley historic site was listed on the New South Wales State Heritage Register on 2 April 1999.
