= River Lett =

Coordinates: 33°32′S 150°12′E

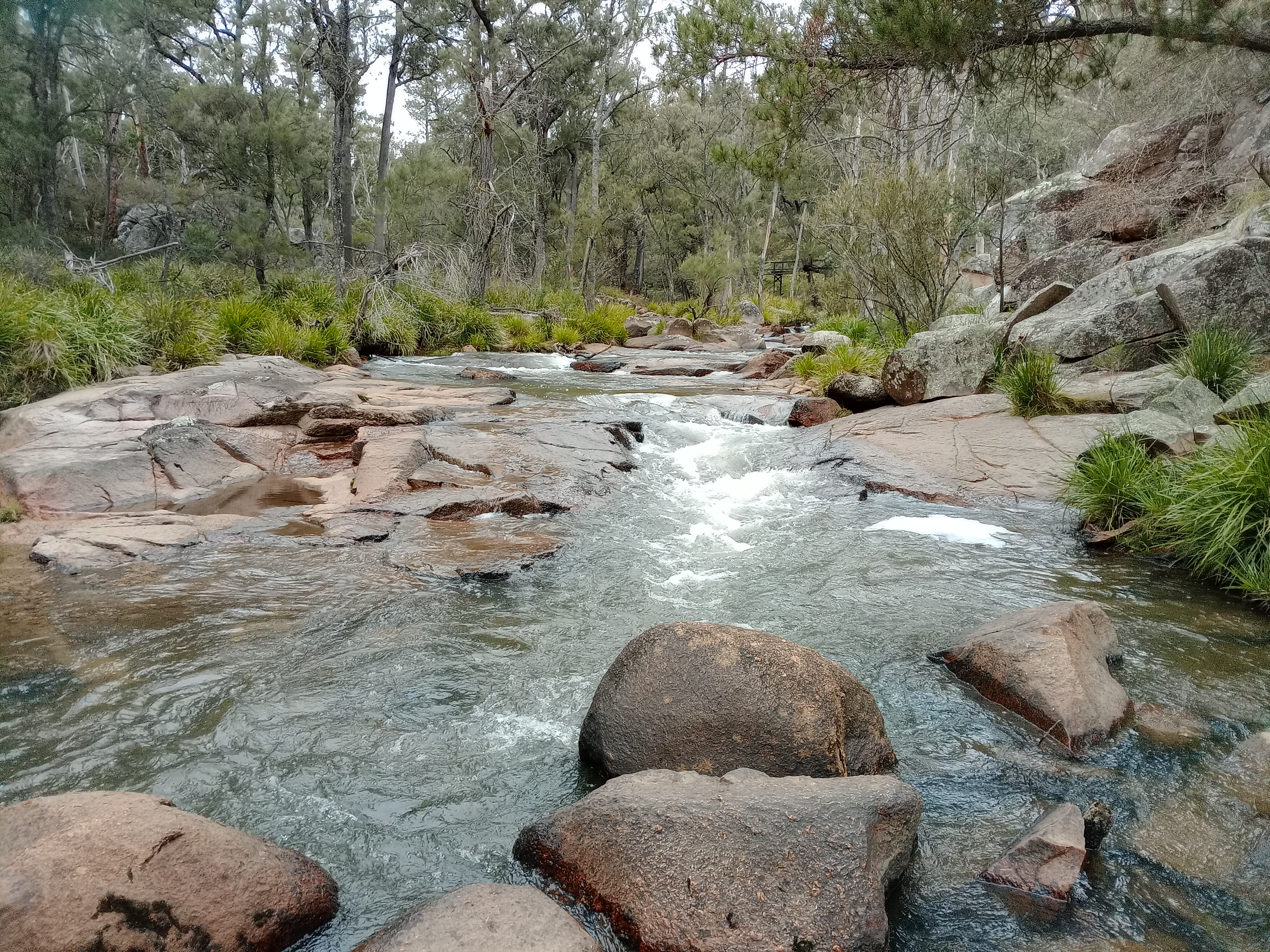
- The rapids of the River Lett
- Etymology: "the rivulet"

Location
- Country: Australia
- State: New South Wales
- Region: Sydney Basin (IBRA), Central Tablelands
- Municipality: City of Lithgow

Physical characteristics
- Source: Bell Range
  - location: near Bell
- Mouth: confluence with the Coxs River
  - location: at Glenroy, south-west of Hartley
- Length: 10 km (6.2 mi)

Basin features
- River system: Hawkesbury-Nepean catchment
- Tributaries
  - left: Dargans Creek
  - right: Kangaroo Corner Creek

The River Lett is a perennial stream of the Hawkesbury-Nepean catchment. It is located in the Central Tablelands region of New South Wales, Australia.

== Etymology ==
In his survey of the area in 1813 surveyor George Evans recorded the presence of a small stream (or 'Rivulet') which he spelt as "Rivulett". In 1834, a survey plan created by Henry Butler used the spelling "River Lett", which has become the official name.

== Course ==
The River Lett rises on the southern slopes of the Bell Range, below Bell, approximately 10 kilometres (6.2 mi) north of Mount Victoria, and flows generally west south-west, joined by two minor tributaries, before reaching its confluence with the Coxs River, at Glenroy, south-west of the historical settlement of Hartley. The river course is approximately 10 kilometres (6.2 mi).

The Great Western Highway traverses the River Lett near Hartley, at the bottom of the ascent of River Lett Hill. The remains of an old timber bridge that carried traffic on the Great Western Highway over the River Lett can be found near the settlement of Hartley.

The river passes by the Hartley historic site, where the Rowson's River Walk is. The walk descends down to the river, where there is a boardwalk leading to the historic Rowson's Huts.

== See also ==
- List of rivers of Australia
- List of rivers of New South Wales (L–Z)
- Rivers of New South Wales
