= Kiacatoo =

Kiacatoo New South Wales
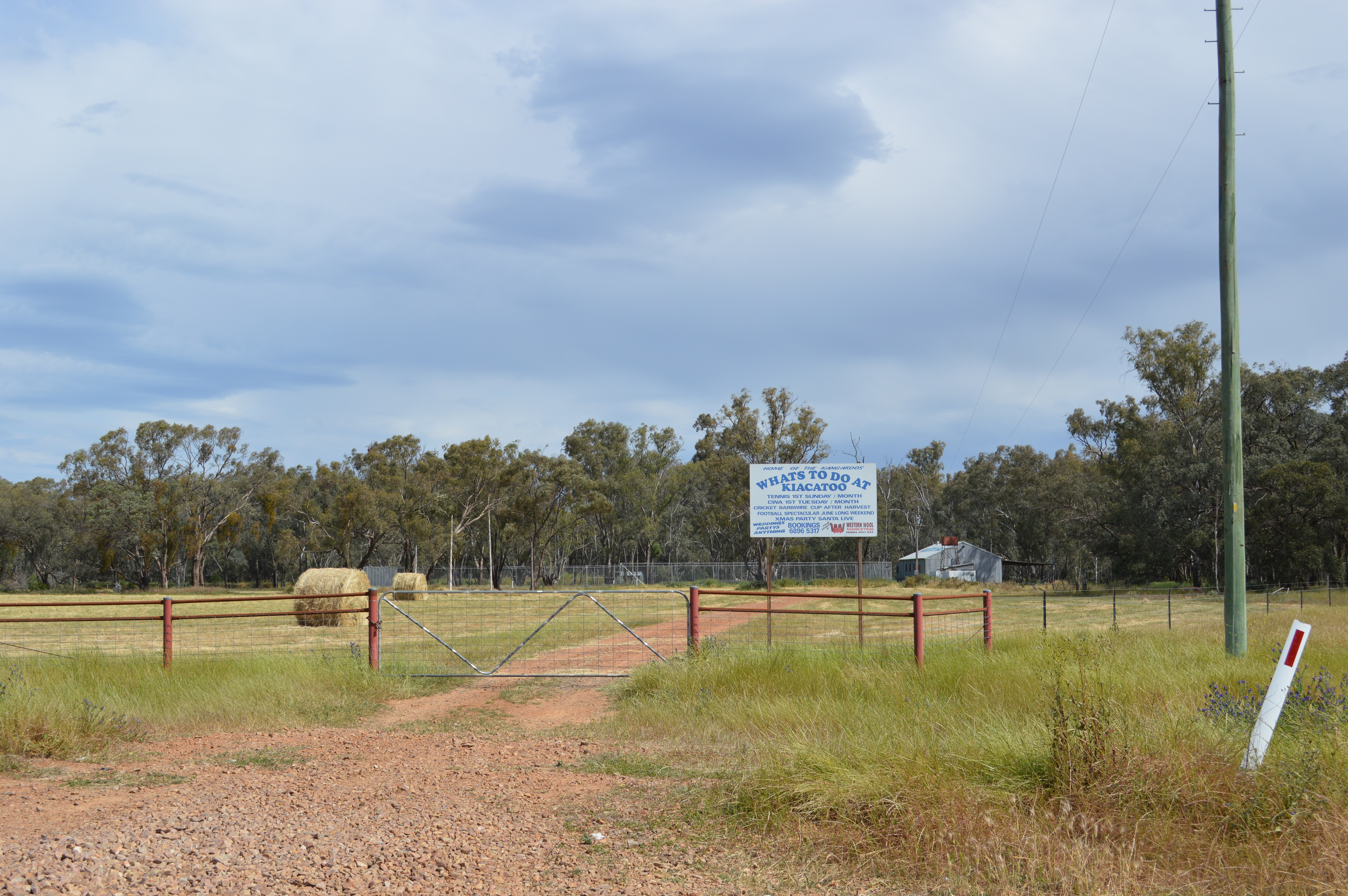
- Kiacatoo Recreation Reserve

- Coordinates: 33°03′S 146°06′E
- Population: 27 (2016 census)
- Postcode(s): 2877
- Location: 499 km (310 mi) W of Sydney; 241 km (150 mi) W of Orange; 40 km (25 mi) W of Condobolin
- LGA(s): Lachlan Shire
- State electorate(s): Barwon
- Federal division(s): Parkes

Kiacatoo is a locality in western New South Wales, Australia. The locality is in the Lachlan Shire and on the Lachlan River, 499 kilometres (310 mi) west of the state capital, Sydney.

At the 2016 census, Kiacatoo had a population of 27.
