= George Evans (explorer) =

English surveyor and explorer (1780–1852)

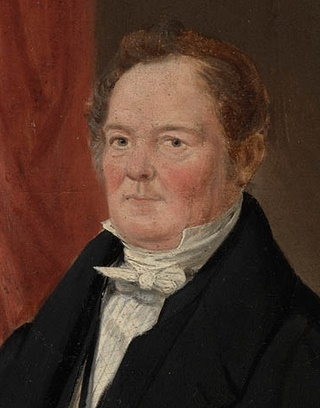
- Detail from a portrait of George Evans by T. J. Lempriere (1847)
- Born: George William Evans; 5 January 1780; Warwick, England
- Died: 16 October 1852 (aged 72); Hobart, Tasmania
- Resting place: St Andrew's Anglican Church, Evandale
- Occupations: Surveyor; explorer
- Spouses: Jennett Melville (m. 1798; died 1825) Lucy Parris Lempriere (m. 1825; died 1849)
- Children: 10

George William Evans (5 January 1780 – 16 October 1852) was a British-born surveyor and early explorer in the interior of the Australian colony of New South Wales.

Evans received early training in surveying and cartography. He arrived in Sydney in October 1802 and was briefly appointed acting-surveyor of the New South Wales colony and later assistant to James Meehan in Van Diemen's Land. In 1813, following the instructions of Governor Macquarie, Evans surveyed a route across the Blue Mountains and became the first European to describe the Bathurst Plains. In 1815 he explored further inland, including country adjoining the Abercrombie, Belubula and upper Lachlan rivers. Evans played a prominent role as second-in-charge under Surveyor-General John Oxley in two separate expeditions: in 1817 exploring the country west of Bathurst along the Lachlan River and in 1818 investigating the territory north of the settled districts from the Macquarie River eastwards to the coast at Port Macquarie. Evans then took up his role as Deputy Surveyor-General in Van Diemen's Land, but in 1824 he came under attack from Lieutenant-Governor Arthur and was accused of malpractice. He was allowed to retire on a pension in late 1825.

Evans and his family lived in England from 1827 to 1832, after which they returned to Sydney where Evans remained until January 1844. He then returned to Hobart Town where he died in 1852.

== Early life ==
George William Evans was born on 5 January 1780 at Warwick in Warwickshire, England, the third child and eldest son of William Evans and Ann (née Southam). His father was secretary to the earl of Warwick.

For a short period Evans served as an apprentice with an engineer and architect and gained some rudimentary training in surveying, as well as cartography and sketching.

== Career ==
=== South Africa ===
George Evans and Jennett Melville were married in 1798. Jennett was the daughter of Captain Thomas Melville, commander of the Britannia, one of the eleven ships comprising the Third Fleet by which convicts, military personnel and administrators were transported to the Sydney penal settlement during 1891. By 1798 Thomas Melville and his family were living in the Cape Colony and he been the commander of several ships owned by Samuel Enderby & Sons plying between England, the Cape Colony and New South Wales.

After their marriage George and Jennett Evans migrated to the Cape of Good Hope, on the Atlantic coast of South Africa, where George was employed in the Naval Store-keeper's Department at Table Bay. The first three of their eventual ten children were born at Cape Town.

=== The Sydney region ===
Evans and his family remained at the Cape of Good Hope until May 1802 when, in compliance with the treaty of Amiens, British forces were withdrawn. Evans was persuaded by Captain William Kent to go to the colony of New South Wales. He and his family arrived at Port Jackson on 16 October 1802 aboard the H.M.S Buffalo. Evans was initially appointed to the position of store-keeper in charge of the receipt and issue of grain at Parramatta, west of Sydney.

In August 1803 the Surveyor of Lands for the colony of New South Wales, Charles Grimes, was granted leave of absence to travel to England and Evans was appointed by the Governor "to do that Gentleman's Duty in his absence". In September 1804 Evans explored the Warragamba River, south-west of Sydney, managing to travel upstream to the present site of Warragamba Dam.

In April 1804 Evans was appointed Lieutenant of the Parramatta Association.

In February 1805 Evans was discharged from the Survey Department by Governor King. He began farming at a settlement on the Hawkesbury River, on land granted to him in 1804. In March 1806 his land was inundated by a disastrous flood. Evans and his family had a narrow escape from drowning, having to be rescued from the roof of their cottage one at a time in a small dinghy.

In January 1809 Lieutenant-Governor William Paterson was appointed acting Governor of New South Wales after Governor Bligh was deposed as a result of the 'Rum Rebellion'. In October 1809 Evans was appointed by acting Governor Paterson as the Deputy Surveyor of Lands at Port Dalrymple, in northern Van Diemen's Land. As it transpired, however, Evans' services were needed in Sydney. In late December 1809 Lachlan Macquarie arrived in the colony to take up his appointment as Governor. In January 1810 he issued orders that James Meehan was to continue to act as "Head Surveyor of the Colony" and Evans was appointed as acting Assistant Surveyor.

In November 1811 a vessel carrying Governor Macquarie was forced to shelter from bad weather in Jervis Bay, south of Sydney. Macquarie subsequently ordered Evans to conduct a survey of the bay. In March 1812 Evans sailed to Jervis Bay aboard the Lady Nelson. After completing the survey he decided to return to Sydney by an inland route. His small party travelled northward and initially turned inland near the present locality of Nowra, where they encountered towering cliffs that blocked their efforts. Continuing to follow a coastal route they crossed the Illawarra escarpment and turned inland once more and succeeded in travelling overland to Appin. The return journey took two weeks, carried out under arduous conditions. Evans' explorations led to the European settlement of the Illawarra district.

=== Van Diemen's Land ===
In July 1812 Evans and Acting Surveyor-General Meehan arrived at Port Dalrymple to begin the process of re-measuring all land grants in Van Diemen's Land, considered by Governor Macquarie to be in a deplorable state through the inefficiency and misconduct of the Deputy Surveyors George Harris (who had died on 16 October 1810) and Peter Mills. The lamentable state of affairs under the mismanagement of Harris and Mills had led to numerous complaints from settlers regarding boundary disputes.

In November 1812 Evans was appointed as Acting Deputy Surveyor of Lands in Van Diemen's Land, to be based at Hobart Town. In August 1813 he was recalled to Sydney and instructed by Governor Macquarie to find a passage into the interior.

=== West of the Blue Mountains ===
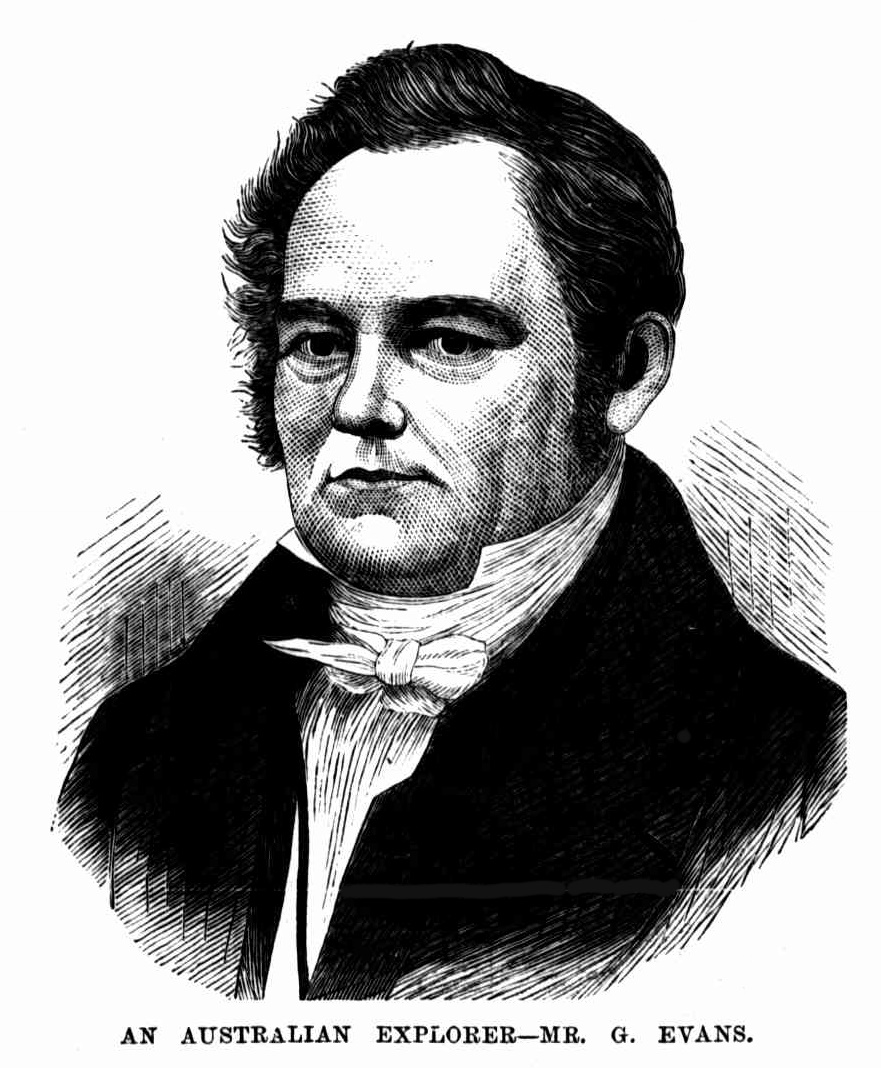
An illustration of George William Evans, published in Australian Town and Country Journal, 29 May 1880.

Evans had arrived in Sydney only ten weeks after the return of Gregory Blaxland, Lieutenant William Lawson and William C. Wentworth from their journey across the Blue Mountains, west of the Sydney region. Blaxland's expedition had reached Mount Blaxland (south of the present site of Lithgow), before returning to Sydney. Governor Macquarie was anxious to establish a passage across the mountainous barrier and determine what type of country lay beyond the Blue Mountains, "with a view to meeting the necessary demands" of the colony's "rapidly increasing population". He appointed Deputy Surveyor Evans to the task of leading a small party to survey the route taken by the Blaxland expedition and to explore and survey the country westward of that point.

Evans' party comprised two free men, Richard Lewis and James Burns, and three convicts, John Cooghan, John Grover and John Tygh. They set out on 20 November 1813, from Emu Ford on the Nepean River at the base of the Blue Mountains, with provisions for two months carried on packhorses. Evans decided to defer measurement of the route between Emu Ford and the Mount Blaxland vicinity until his return. The expedition made good progress, following the track marked by Blaxland, Lawson and Wentworth six months earlier, and reached Mount York after five days. The party descended to the River Lett, where they set up camp. On November 26 Evans commenced his survey; they followed the River Lett downstream to Cox's River, which was crossed and soon afterwards they reached the termination point of Blaxland's expedition.

After leaving Mount Blaxland progress was slow due to the steepness of the country, but after four days open country to the west could be seen and the party reached their first inland-flowing stream which Evans named the Fish River. The party proceeded downstream, with the river "winding through fine flats and round the points of small ridges" (as recorded by Evans). On 6 December they passed through "a fine plain of rich land" which Evans named O'Connell Plains. The next day their progress was temporarily halted by the northward-flowing Campbell's River (at its confluence with the Fish River). The party followed Campbell's River up-stream until they found a suitable place to construct a log bridge, by which they crossed to the western bank. Following the combined streams of the Fish and Campbell's rivers, which Evans named the Macquarie River, on 9 December 1813 the exploring party camped on the site of present-day Bathurst.

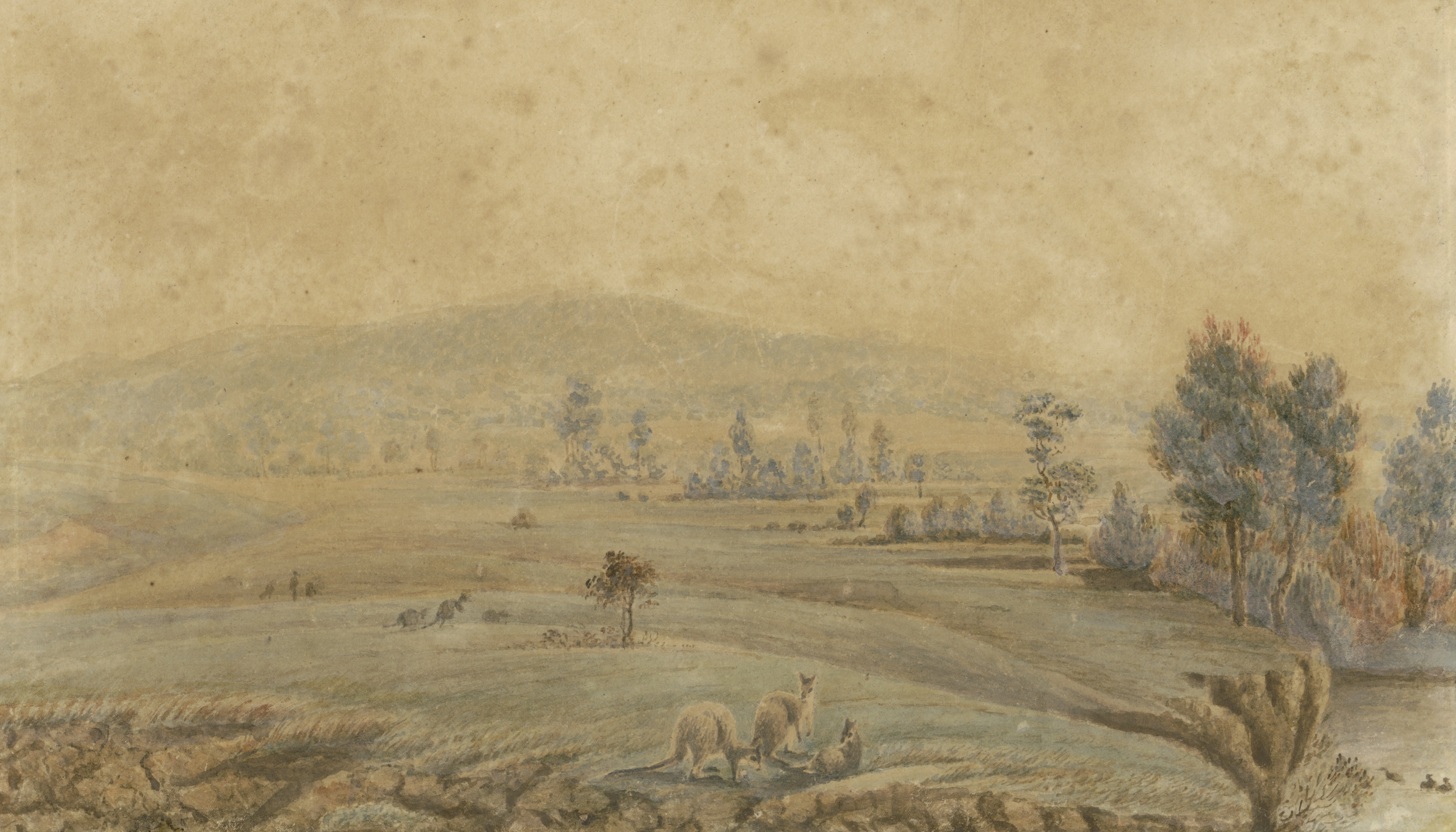
Watercolour painting of the plains west of the Blue Mountains by John William Lewin (about 1815).

Evans was encouraged by the surrounding country which he named Bathurst Plains, describing it as "excellent good land, and the best grass I have seen in any part of New South Wales". The party progressed alongside the Macquarie River and entered hilly country to the north-west, by which stage the condition of the horses became a cause for concern, as the movement of the packs had badly chafed their backs. Evans concluded his survey on 16 December and two days later he and his men commenced their homeward journey. Their return route was more direct, leaving the Macquarie River and rejoining it near its confluence with Campbell's River. At this location on 21 December, Evans and his men had their first contact with aborigines of the Wiradjuri nation of central-western New South Wales, when they encountered two women and four children. Evans recorded that "the poor creatures trembled and fell down with fright". He gave them some fish, fish-hooks and twine and a tomahawk. After some time "they began to be good humoured and laugh".

Evans and his party arrived back at Emu Plains on 8 January 1814. Their exploration and survey work had involved a journey of three hundred miles, carried out over a period of fifty days. The country traversed was far superior to any hitherto located within the colony, and provided a practicable opportunity for expansion of settlement. On 12 February 1814 a Government Order was published in the Sydney Gazette providing a summary of the journey of exploration. Governor Macquarie awarded Evans a grant of one thousand acres in Van Diemen's Land (near Richmond in the south-east of the colony, with frontage to the Coal River) and "a pecuniary reward from the colonial funds" (amounting to one hundred pounds).

In May 1814 Evans sailed with his family for Hobart Town to take up his new appointment of Deputy Surveyor of Lands in Van Diemen's Land. In September 1814 his appointment as Deputy Surveyor was officially confirmed. By early 1815 Governor Macquarie was planning to personally visit the country west of the Blue Mountains and he chose Evans as his guide. As directed by the governor, the surveyor sailed from Hobart Town to Port Jackson in March 1815.

=== The Lachlan River valley ===
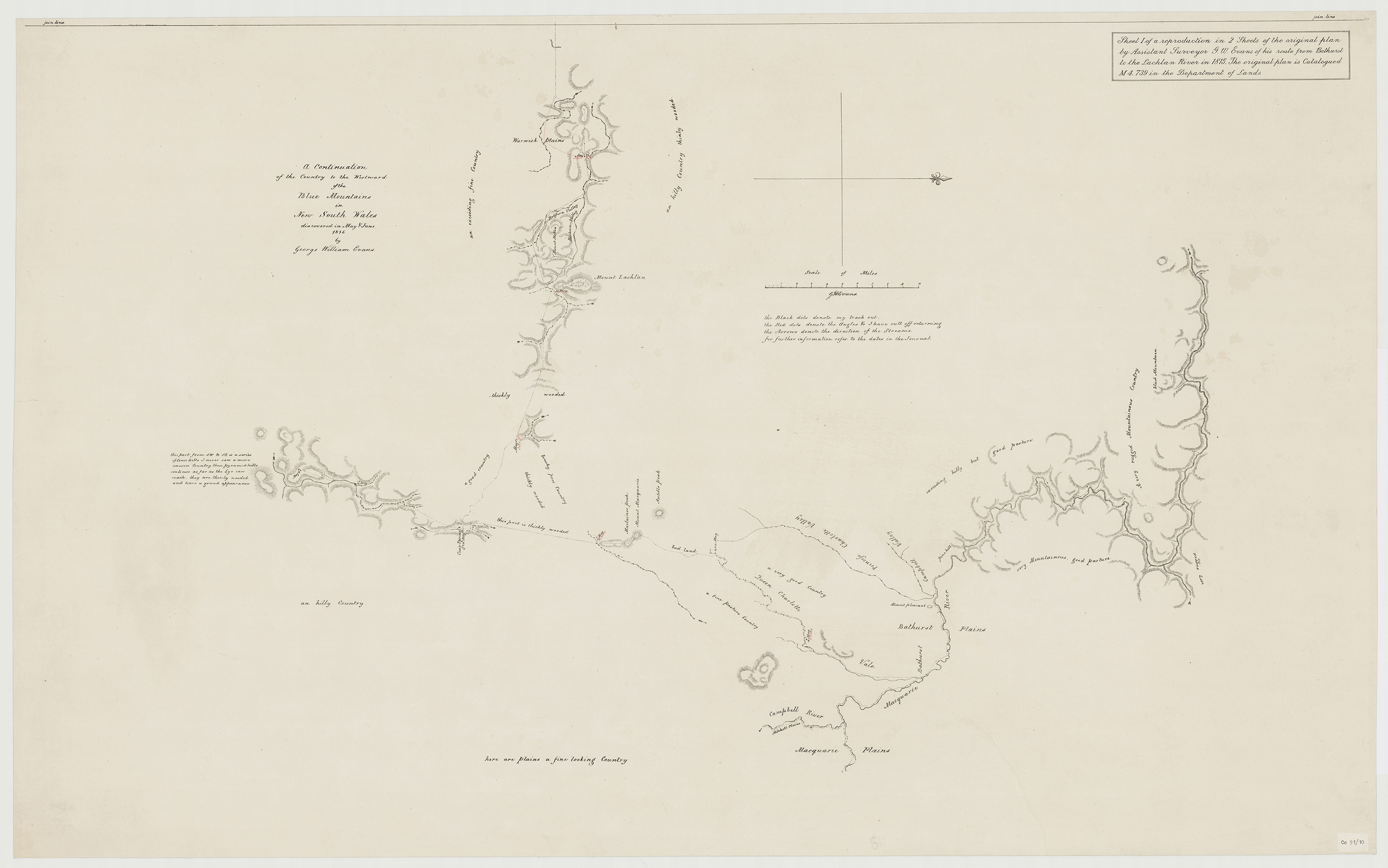
George Evans' map of his route from Bathurst to the Lachlan River in 1815.

After returning to Sydney Evans travelled along the road across the Blue Mountains, recently constructed by convict labour under the supervision of William Cox, to a depot established on the Bathurst Plains (at the future site of Bathurst township). On 25 April 1815 Governor Macquarie and his wife Elizabeth, with three others, left Parramatta for the Nepean River. At Emu Ford the official party gathered, which included Cox and Surveyor-General John Oxley, to travel by carriage and horseback along Cox's road. The party reached Mount York in four days, and then descended to Bathurst Plains via Cox's Pass, reaching the depot on 4 May, where they were greeted by Evans.

For the next week Evans accompanied Governor Macquarie as he examined the surrounding district. Before returning to Sydney, Macquarie directed Evans to proceed "on a further tour of discovery" in a south-west direction "in the hopes of falling in with the Macquarie River in that quarter".

Evans set out from the Bathurst depot on 13 May 1815 with provisions for six weeks carried on two packhorses, accompanied by George Kane (alias Thomas Appledore), Patrick Nurns and John Tygh. After following several creeks in a south-westerly direction, the party reached the catchment of the Abercrombie River. On 23 May they encountered the upper reaches of the Belubula River and followed its course to a narrow gorge known as The Needles, where further progress along the river was obstructed. Evans then decided to move southward and on 26 May they reached the Lachlan River, eight miles upstream of the present town of Cowra. Evans noted that numerous aboriginal campfires were seen in the vicinity. He followed the river upstream for a short distance and named the surrounding country Oxley Plains, after the Surveyor-General of the colony. The party then continued their journey downstream along the Lachlan until on 30 May they reached the confluence of the Belubula and the Lachlan rivers. Evans recorded in his journal that they encountered aborigines "two or three times a day", observing: "I believe we are a great terror to them". With dwindling provisions, on 1 June at the junction of Mandagery Creek and the Lachlan River (near present-day Eugowra), Evans decided to return to Bathurst. He marked a tree at the locality with his name and the date. The party returned by a more direct route, travelling eastward across Mount Lachlan and reaching Bathurst on 12 June.

In mid-July 1815 Evans received the promised land grant of one thousand acres near Richmond in Van Diemen's Land for his survey work across the Blue Mountains to the Bathurst Plains, as well as a further grant of 370 acres at the junction of the rivers Jordan and Derwent and a town lease in Hobart Town (at the intersection of Argyle and Collins streets). Evans sailed for Hobart Town on 19 July 1815 aboard the brig Emu. During the following seventeen months he was engaged in routine survey duties in Van Diemen's Land, including the surveying of a road from George Town to Port Dalrymple (Launceston) in 1816.

=== First Oxley expedition ===
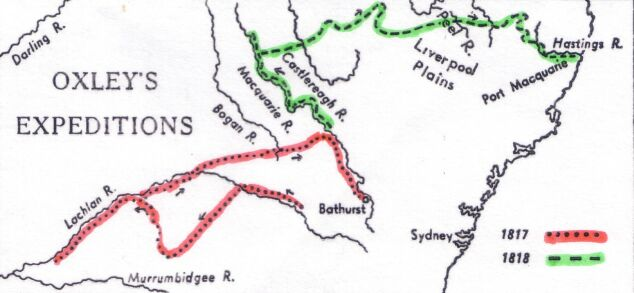
1817 and 1818 Expeditions of Oxley

Governor Macquarie communicated the details of Evans' expeditions and surveys west of the Blue Mountains to Lord Bathurst, the Secretary of State for War and the Colonies in the British Government. Bathurst appreciated the importance of Evans' discoveries, but expessed misgivings in regard to Evans' lack of formal qualifications as a land surveyor and the absence of training and education in the geological and botanical sciences. In his planning for a further expedition "for prosecuting the discoveries recently made to the westward of the Blue Mountains", Macquarie deferred to Bathurst's superior authority and selected John Oxley, the New South Wales Surveyor-General, to lead the expedition and Evans as his second-in-command.

Evans arrived in Sydney from Van Diemen's Land in February 1817. He assembled the main exploring party and then travelled to the Lachlan River via Bathurst and established a depot about nine miles upstream of the Belubula River confluence. Two boats were constructed at the site in readiness for the arrival of the Surveyor-General. Oxley travelled on horseback from Sydney and joined the main party on 25 April. The exploring party now comprised thirteen men, including Oxley and Evans, the botanists Allan Cunningham and Charles Fraser and the convict surveyor William Parr as mineralogist and cartographer.

The exploring party set out on 28 April, with the boats being accompanied by fourteen pack horses. On 5 May, while navigating the boats through a section of the river choked with fallen timber, the party passed the site of the present town of Forbes. As they travelled further west the rising river narrowed and then spread out into a series of swamps and inundated country which impeded the progress of the expedition. Oxley eventually concluded that further effort to follow the Lachlan River should be abandoned and decided to attempt to reach the southern coast of Australia via the open country to the south-west. The expedition left the river system on 18 May, and passed the present locality of Ungarie two days later, where the lack of water in the dry shrubby country became their central concern. On 1 July they reached the base of the Cocoparra Range where some water was obtained from rock-holes to temporarily sustain them. On 5 July, as the expedition reached the southern extremity of the Cocoparra Range, Oxley despaired of further progress due to the lack of water and feed for the horses and decided to turn back in a north-westerly direction to the expected location of the Lachlan river. His decision to not continue in a south-westerly direction was based on the negative report of two men sent on ahead. They had travelled only about seven miles to a location close to Mirrool Creek (unbeknownst to them only twenty-five miles north of the Murrumbidgee River).

Oxley directed his men to travel north-west. They reached the Macpherson Range near present-day Griffith, but a lack of water and thick eucalyptus scrub forced their return to the base of the Cocoparra Range, their progress by that stage hampered by prolonged heavy rain. The party rested until 12 June and continued the journey, reaching the vicinity of present-day Rankin's Springs after three days. By 18 June "the horses were utterly incapable of proceeding with their present loads to any distance". Half of the provisions were unloaded, to be gathered in later days, and the horses taken for recuperation to a small valley selected by Evans "which afforded both good grass and water". Five days later Oxley's party regained the Lachlan River, upstream of the northern extremity of the Lachlan Range. The exploring party then continued to follow the river downstream. As they neared the site of Hillston they were continually impeded by boggy conditions, with the water spreading across the adjoining flat country. The party camped near present-day Booligal on 7 July. After a reconnaissance upstream disclosed widespread inundation, Oxley made the decision to return to Bathurst, with only eleven horses and ten weeks' provisions remaining.

The party began its return on 9 July 1817, travelling upstream on the southern bank of the Lachlan River with the intention of verifying that the stream being followed was the same as the one they had departed from in mid-May. On 25 July, while the party were engaged in felling trees to form a bridge across the south-flowing Lake Creek, Oxley reconnoitred southwards for two miles to the expanse of water now known as Lake Cargelligo. The next day Evans climbed a hill overlooking the lake and spent several hours sketching the "highly picturesque and pleasing" scenery. After crossing Lake Creek the party continued along the river until they reached the northern extremity of the Goobothery Range at the present-day locality of Kiacatoo. From the summit of the range Oxley recognised landforms to the east that he had recorded in May and was satisfied they had been following the Lachlan River. In order to avoid the "marshy grounds" that lay ahead, Oxley resolved to cross the river and continue in an east-north-easterly direction to join with the Macquarie River and hence to Bathurst.

A raft was constructed under Evans' supervision and the party crossed to the northern bank of the fast-flowing river on 3 August. Proceeding in an east-north-east direction with lightly-loaded horses, the party was dependent for its water on natural wells and rockholes. On 13 August they reached the Bogan River, which they followed for a short distance, but with diminishing provisions the party turned to the east and after three days encountered the Little River and two days later the Bell River valley, before reaching the Macquarie River on 19 August at a locality that Oxley named Wellington Vale. The party remained there for several days while Oxley, Evans and Cunningham evaluated the surrounding country. On 22 August they broke camp and proceeded upstream along the Bell and Macquarie watersheds, before turning eastward to reach Bathurst on 29 August 1817.

In informing Governor Macquarie of the success of his expedition, Oxley acknowledged the contribution of his second-in-command, George Evans, "for his able advice and cordial co-operation throughout the expedition, and, as far as his previous researches had extended, the accuracy and fidelity of his narrative was fully exemplified". Evans arrived back in Van Diemen's Land in September 1817 to resume his duties in the Survey Department. William Sorell had been appointed Lieutenant-Governor of Van Diemen's Land in April 1817, replacing Colonel Davey. Sorell set about trying to curtail the activities of bushrangers and encourage free immigration by offering incentives. Increased immigration led to a demand for land grants, which caused a backlog in the required survey work in the colony.

=== Second Oxley expedition ===
In March 1818 Evans was recalled for further duty under Surveyor-General Oxley. Based upon Oxley's favourable description of the Macquarie valley, Governor Macquarie had resolved to extend the exploration of the river and its adjacent country. Evans sailed to Sydney aboard the brig Greyhound and then proceeded to Bathurst to organise the boat-building party who were to construct the boats at Wellington Vale. Oxley and Dr. Harris arrived at Bathurst in May and the expedition set out for Wellington Vale, arriving there on 2 June.

The expedition was made up of Oxley and Evans as second-in-command, Dr. John Harris, the botanist Charles Fraser and twelve other men. Eighteen horses carried provisions for twenty-four weeks. They left Wellington Vale on 6 June 1818 and passed the confluence of the Macquarie and Little rivers two days later. On 11 June the party passed the site of Dubbo and the confluence of the Talbragar River with the Macquarie. Near the site of present-day Narromine the Macquarie River occasionally became contracted into narrow rocky channels, making progress by the boats difficult. On 27 June, after passing the location of Warren, the party ascended Mount Harris, a basalt hill beside the river, where they gained their first view of the Warrumbungles mountain range to the east. As they progressed the country adjacent to the river was often flooded, requiring wide detours by the horses and their handlers. Further progress overland became impossible when they reached the Macquarie Marshes on 30 June. Oxley then directed the expedition to return upstream to the vicinity of Mount Harris in order to regroup.

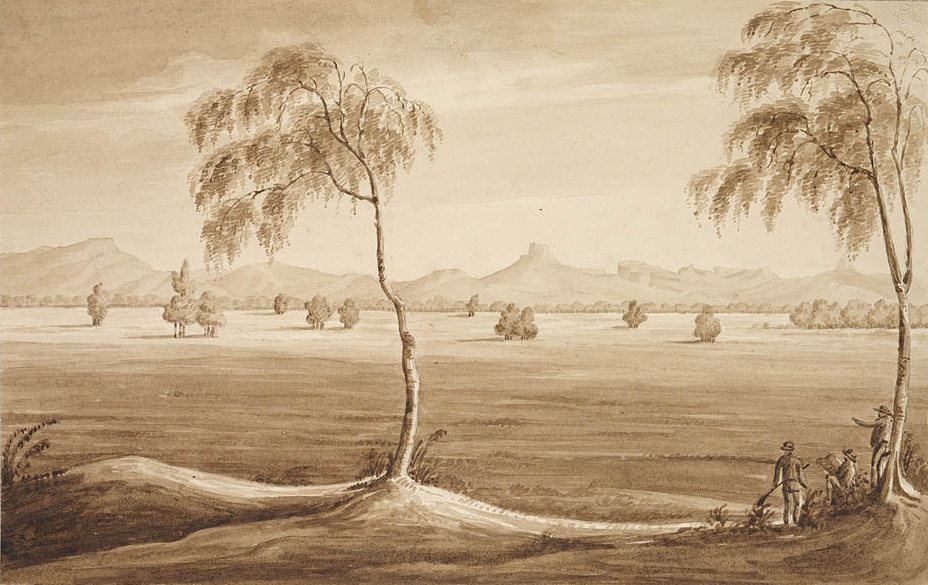
Watercolour painting of Arbuthnot's Range (the Warrumbungles), from a sketch by George Evans, with Acacia pendula trees in the foreground.

Oxley revised his strategy and decided to temporarily divide his party. He himself would lead an excursion by boat, in an effort to determine the course of the Macquarie River beyond the marshy country that had halted their progress. Oxley planned for Evans and a small party to proceed from Mount Harris in a north-easterly direction to gain knowledge of the country they would pass through in a journey to the coast. Oxley set out by boat on 2 July. After two days of travelling downstream the boat party found themselves surrounded by reeds, with all land and trees being absent. Oxley persisted for a further four miles, expecting to enter "the Australian Sea", but eventually abandoned any further attempt to penetrate the marsh and returned to land before nightfall. Four days later his party arrived back at Mount Harris, with Evans about to depart on his reconnaissance to the north-east.

Evans and his party left the Mount Harris depot on 8 July, initially travelling in a north-easterly direction, crossing flooded creeks and often inundated country. After three days Evans set a course for the northern extremity of the Warrumbungle Range and on 12 July he encountered the Castlereagh River, at a point six miles south of present-day Coonamble. After fording the river the party encountered further boggy conditions as they approached the foothills of the Warrumbungles. On 14 July they commenced the return journey to the Mount Harris depot, eventually completing a circuitous route of 175 miles (282 km) in eleven days through boggy and densely vegetated country.

The full Oxley expedition departed from the Mount Harris depot on 20 July, intending to travel to the coast, north of the settled districts around Sydney. Oxley opted to initially proceed in an easterly direction, bisecting Evans' outward and inward journeys. The party was detained for four days crossing the Castlereagh River, which had reached flood levels. They ascended the northern end of the Warrumbungles on 8 August. Their forward progress was continually impeded by boggy and inundated country. On 26 August, from an elevated position near the present site of Mullaley, the party gained their first view of the Liverpool Plains, onto which they descended. They reached the Mooki River the following day and crossed the Peel River on 2 September. The party crossed the Cockburn River and camped on the banks of the Macdonald River on 7 September, near the summit of the Great Dividing Range. Their progress was delayed by the Apsley River gorge, which they eventually traversed on 15 September at the Apsley Falls. The expedition crossed the Tia and Yarrowitch rivers and on 24 September reached the Hastings River, which they followed to the coast. They reached the ocean on 8 October, naming the coastal inlet Port Macquarie.

Oxley's expedition began the journey south on 12 October, during which they encountered difficulties crossing the eastward flowing streams and rivers. They were fortunate in discovering a small boat, washed ashore and almost buried in sand, that enabled them to cross the outlets of the Manning River with their horses. The party reached the northern shore of the Port Stephens estuary on 1 November, where Oxley decided to halt their progress and send Evans and three men to Newcastle in order to obtain assistance and provisions from the commandant there. Evans and his companions crossed to the southern shore and travelled the thirty-six miles (60 km) overland to Newcastle in one day. The commandant, Captain Wallis, then sent a large boat to bring the remaining members of the expedition to Newcastle.

After reaching Sydney, Evans remained there for two weeks before sailing to Hobart aboard the brig Prince Leopold, arriving there on 20 December 1818. Evans was later rewarded with a gift of one hundred pounds for his part in the expedition.

=== Van Diemen's Land ===
By 1819 Evans possessed a grant of one thousand acres on the Coal River and owned a 370-acre farm at Herdsman's Cove, under cultivation with wheat, beans and potatoes and supporting a herd of sheep and forty-one cattle, being worked by seven Government servants. Evans and his family resided in Liverpool Street in Hobart Town.

Evans was an accomplished artist. Several watercolours survive from his period at Parramatta after first arriving in New South Wales. Sketches produced by Evans during the journeys undertaken under the command of Surveyor-General Oxley in 1817 and 1818 were subsequently engraved to illustrate Oxley's account of the expeditions, Two Expeditions into the Interior of Australia, published in 1820.

In 1820 Commissioner Bigge recommended the separation of the offices of the Survey Department in New South Wales and Van Diemen's Land, and the appointment of a Surveyor-General and Assistant Surveyor in the latter settlement. In September 1821 Thomas Scott was appointed as Assistant Surveyor and Evans was designated Deputy Surveyor General of Lands, with the additional titles of Collector of Quit Rents and Inspector of Roads and Bridges.

During May and June 1821 Governor Macquarie visited Van Diemen's Land and Evans accompanied him on a tour of inspection of the settled districts.

By the end of 1821 Lieutenant-Governor Sorell had decided to find a suitable locality to confine "the worst types of convicts". In January 1822 Evans was sent to the selected location of Macquarie Harbour to survey the harbour and its hinterland. On his return Evans negotiated the sale of his residence in Liverpool Street and began preparations to construct a new home on his 100-acre holding on New Town Bay. The home constructed at New Town for Evans and his family was named 'Warwick Lodge'.

A book written by Evans, describing the colony of Van Diemen's Land, was published in London in February 1822. The publication, A Geographical, Historical and Topographical Description of Van Diemen's Land, was based on the author's personal observations. It was intended as a guide for potential emigrants and included information "respecting the application for grants of land" and other information for those unfamiliar with the colony. One of Evans' watercolour sketches of Hobart Town was used as the template for the foldout aquatint etching used as the frontispiece in the original edition. The book was a success in England and in 1823 French and German editions were published. In 1824 a second English edition was published under the title History and Description of the Present State of Van Diemen's Land.

Lieutenant-Governor Sorell's term of office ended in May 1824, replaced by Lieutenant-Governor George Arthur.

=== Accusations and retirement ===
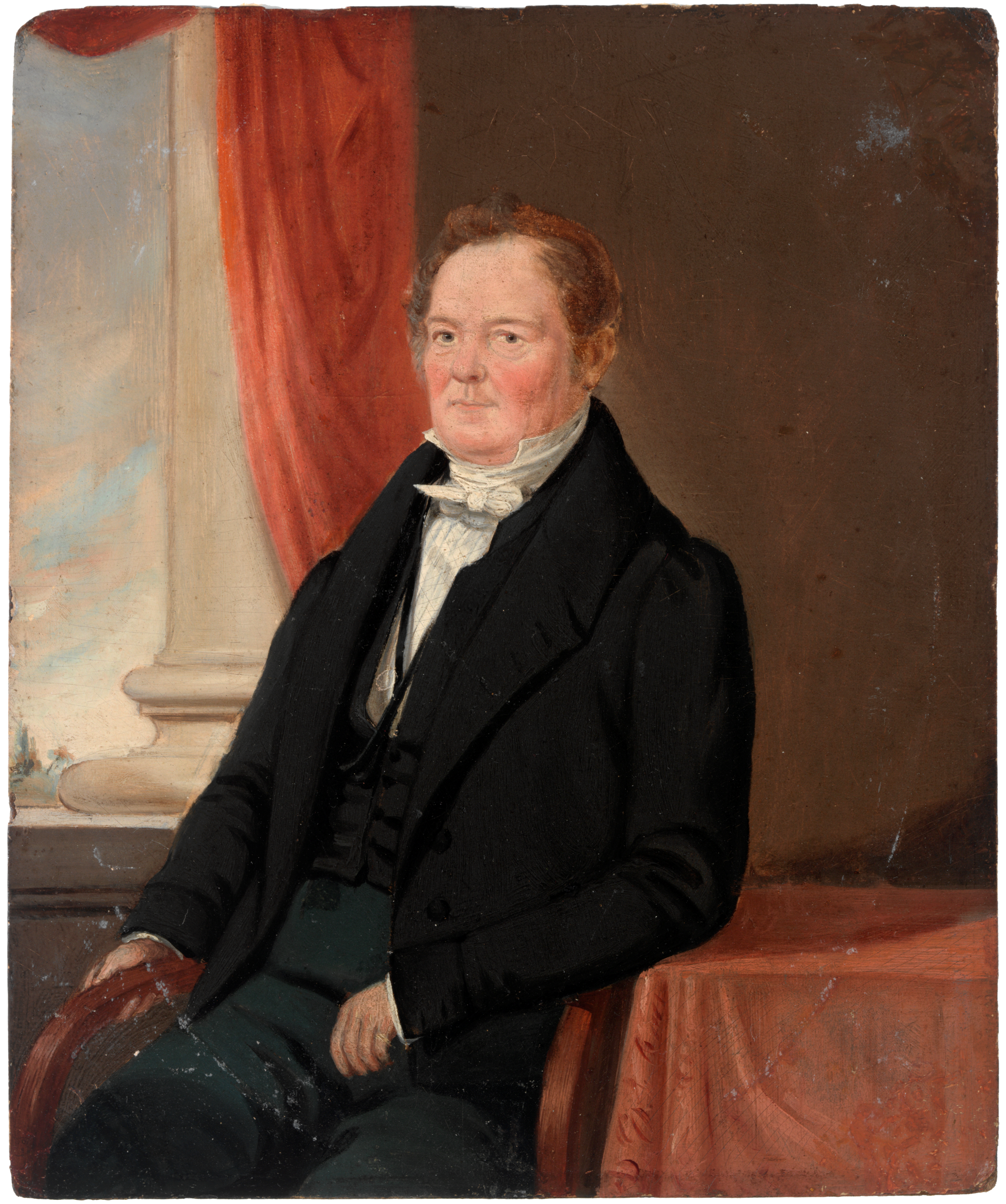
Portrait of George Evans by Thomas J. Lempriere (1847).

Soon after Arthur had taken up his post as Lieutenant-Governor of Van Diemen's Land, he was informed of irregularities within the Survey Department and Deputy Surveyor Evans became the subject of accusations of malpractice. In August 1824 Evans left for Sydney on the ship Chapman to discuss the situation with Surveyor-General Oxley, returning to Hobart in September aboard the Prince Regent.

The case that Arthur proposed to lay a malpractice charge against Evans concerned a grant of land to W. E. Lawrence in 1823. Lawrence had arrived in Van Diemen's Land bearing instructions from the Under-Secretary for the Colonies, Henry Goulburn, addressed to the New South Wales Governor, Sir Thomas Brisbane, directing that a grant of two thousand acres be made to Lawrence and an equal amount be made to his brother, with a supplementary recommendation that additional grants be reserved to be possibly granted to the brothers in future years. In October 1823, before Evans' departure for Port Dalrymple to supervise the survey, Lieutenant-Governor Sorell issued instructions to locate eight thousand acres "adjoining the town of Launceston" for Lawrence and his brother, with directions to increase the area where sections of the land were "back hills being rocky and useless". The survey was carried out by Thomas Scott, supervised by Evans. An area of four thousand acres was considered waste land and was added to the approved area of eight thousand acres, making a total area of twelve thousand acres.

When Evans found himself under attack from Arthur he decided to seek retirement, for which purpose he submitted a memorial to Governor Brisbane for approval to retire on a pension. However Arthur chose not to forward Evan's memorial to Governor Brisbane while he made efforts to gather sufficient evidence to have Evans dismissed from office. On 6 April 1825 Evans wife Jennett died at Hobart Town, aged 41. Soon afterwards, after communicating with the Governor's private secretary, Evans was informed that his memorial had not been received. Arthur finally forwarded the memorial to Governor Brisbane in May 1825, but then informed Evans that Brisbane had advised that a more satisfactory account of the Lawrence grant be provided "before any indulgent consideration from Government would be possible".

George Evans and Lucy Parris Lempriere were married on 13 October 1825 at Hobart.

In the end fate intervened to cause a cessation of Lieutenant-Governor Arthur's efforts to dismiss Evans for malpractice. Governor Brisbane was replaced by General Ralph Darling, with Darling arriving at Sydney from England on 25 November 1825, accompanied by his nephew Edward Dumaresq, who the new Governor considered would be competent to fill the office of Deputy Surveyor-General in Van Diemen's Land. This decision was conveyed to Arthur in Hobart and advice of Evans' retirement and the provisional appointment of Dumaresq was published in the Hobart Town Gazette of 17 December 1825. Even though Evans' retirement had been approved from expediency, to enable Dumaresq's appointment to be confirmed, after further examination a pension of £200 per annum was approved by the Colonial Office.

=== England ===
By 1827 Evans had decided to return to England for period of time, probably "motivated by a natural desire to see his homeland after so long an absence, and possibly to enable his daughters to obtain a fuller education than was available to them in the new colony". Some historians have speculated that the reason for his return was to personally plead his case for a pension before the Colonial Office, but Evans was already receiving the pension granted by Lieutenant-Governor Arthur when Edward Dumaresq was appointed as Acting Surveyor-General. In October 1827 Evans applied through the Colonial Treasurer for his pension to be paid by the Colonial Agent in London.

Evans and his family sailed for England aboard the Henry, which departed from Hobart on 16 November 1826.

Evans resided in Warwickshire during much of his period in England, and supplemented his pension by teaching art. In England Evans heard of John Oxley's death in May 1828. He applied for the vacant position of Surveyor-General in New South Wales but was unsuccessful. In 1828 a hand-coloured etching of Hobart Town, based on Evans' drawing, was published as an independent print by Rudolph Ackermann of London. A son was born to George and Lucy Evans in London in 1829 and a daughter in 1831. In October 1831 Evans requested to surrender his pension of £200 per annum for a sum of money equal to three or four years' advance of the pension. The eventual settlement amounted to a lump sum of £600.

In March 1832 Evans and his family left England for Sydney aboard the Elizabeth.

=== Return to Sydney ===
Evans arrived in Sydney in August 1832 aboard the ship Elizabeth. He established a business as a bookseller and stationer in Bridge Street. In addition to his business, in 1833 Evans took on the role of Drawing Master at The King's School in Parramatta. Evan's wife Lucy conducted an Establishment for Young Ladies at several locations in the period 1834 to 1837.

In early 1839 Evans' wife and family returned to Hobart to live. Evans remained in Sydney until January 1844, though he visited his family in Hobart on a number of occasions. During this period Evans produced watercolours of Parramatta scenes and views of Sydney Harbour.

== Later life and death ==
In January 1844 Evans returned to Hobart Town and resided at 'Warwick Lodge'. In poor health and without the benefit of a pension, Evans made every effort to supplement his limited resources. In the following years he disposed of lands acquired in the Hobart parish and the Argyle district. In February 1848 he sold 'Warwick Lodge' to his son George. In June 1848 Evans advertised his intention to offer lessons in "pencil and water colours, as well as flower painting" by attendance at schools or in private houses.

Evan's wife Lucy died on 17 August 1849, aged 42, after which Evans moved to a two-storey house at 167 Macquarie Street under the care of one of his daughters, assisted by a servant and a labourer.

George Evans died at his Macquarie Street residence in Hobart on 16 October 1852, aged 72. The medical practitioner who attended immediately after his death certified the cause as heart failure.

Evans was buried in the same grave as his second wife Lucy, in the cemetery behind St. John's church at New Town, Hobart.

In 1962 the headstone from Evans' grave was re-erected in the form of a memorial within the grounds of St. Andrew's church at Evandale, a Tasmanian town on the South Esk River named after the surveyor and explorer.

== Publications ==
- George William Evans (1822), A Geographical, Historical and Topographical Description of Van Diemen’s Land, London: John Souter.

== Gallery ==
A selection of original images by George W. Evans (or based on drawings or sketches by Evans)
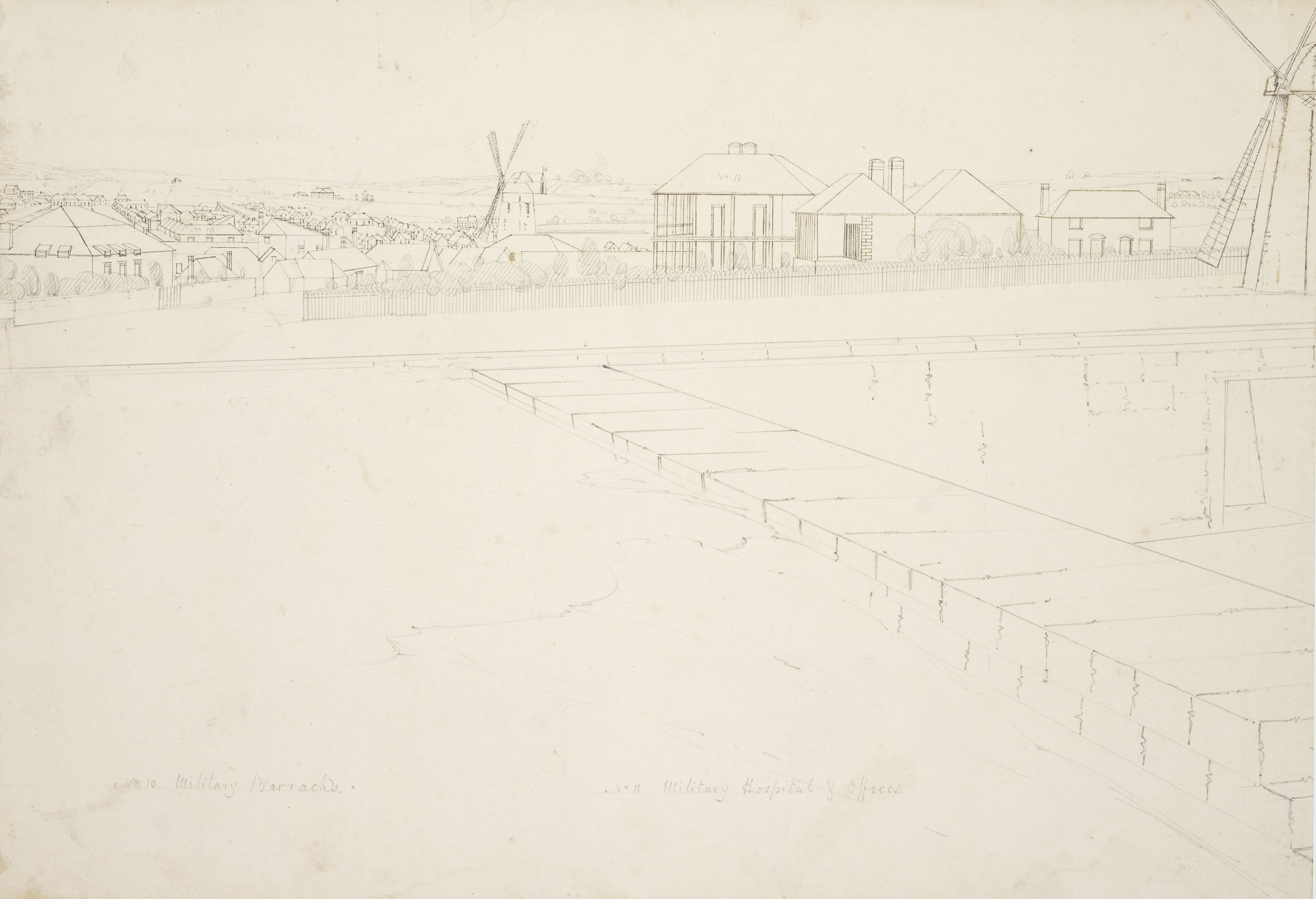
'Panoramic View of the Town and Harbour of Sydney New South Wales' (one of eleven), possibly drawn by George W. Evans.

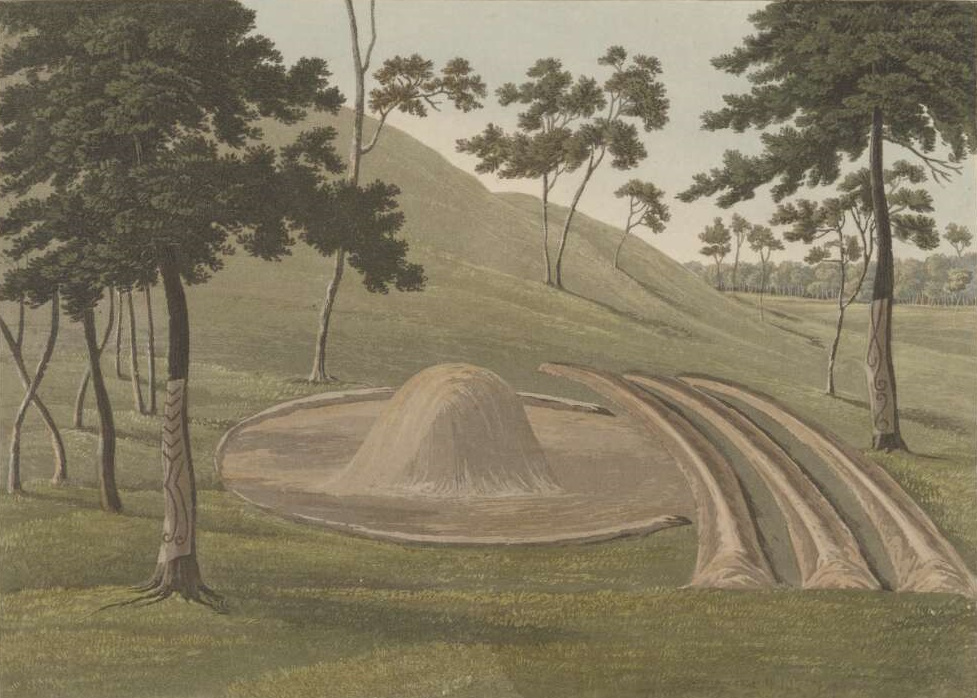
Hand-coloured aquatint: 'The Grave of a Native of Australia', engraved by R. Havell & Son, published by John Murray (London) in 1820.

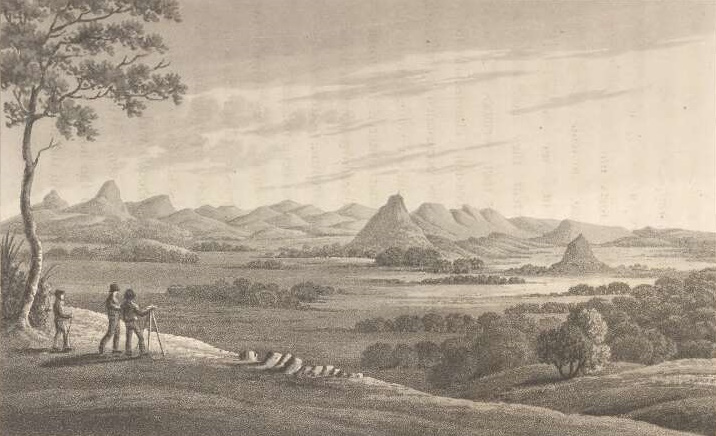
Aquatint: 'Liverpool Plains, West Prospect from View Hill', drawn by Major James Taylor from a sketch by Evans, engraved by John Clark, published by John Murray (London) in 1820.

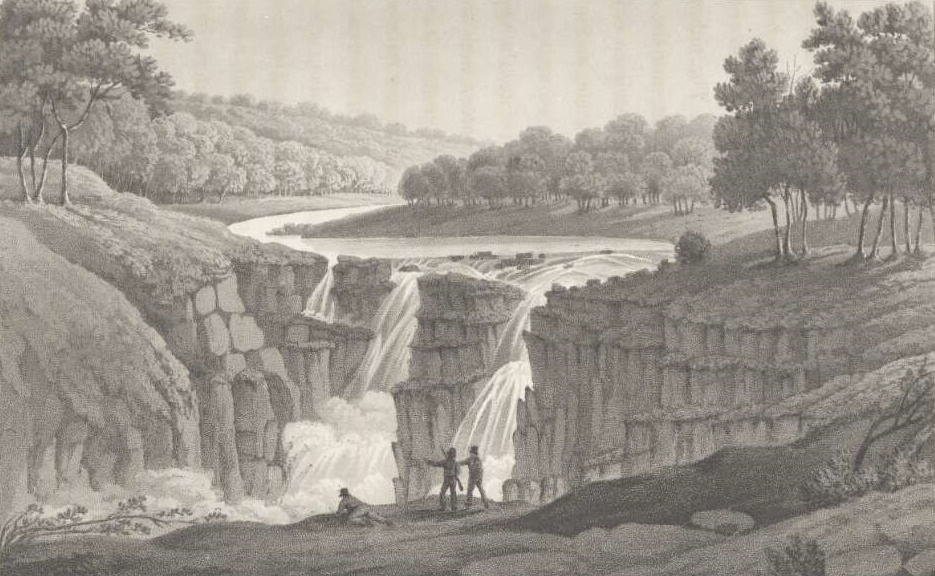
Aquatint: 'Bathurst's Fall' (Apsley Falls), drawn by Major James Taylor from a sketch by Evans, engraved by John Clark, published by John Murray (London) in 1820.

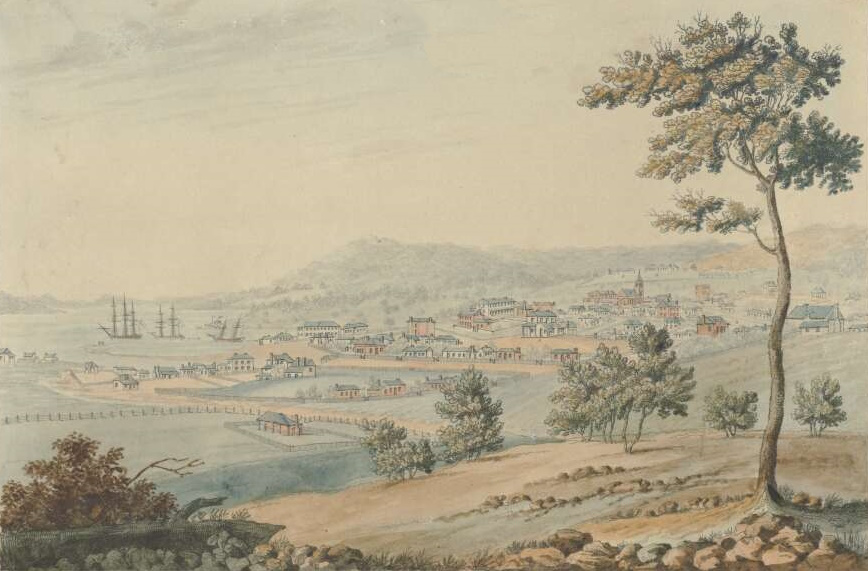
Frontispiece to A Geographical, Historical and Topographical Description of Van Diemen's Land, etching by Henry Adlard, published by J. Souter (London) in 1822.

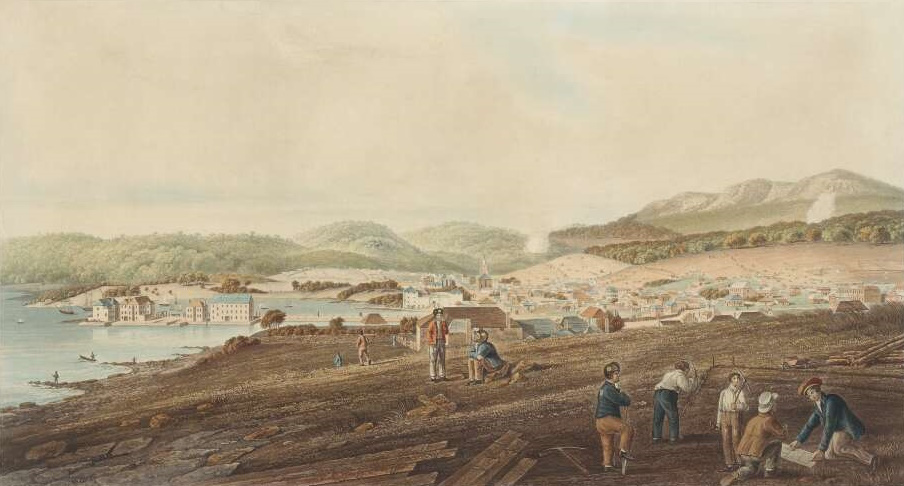
Hand-coloured aquatint: 'Hobart Town, Van Diemen's Land', engraved by R. G. Reeve, published by Rudolph Ackermann (London) in 1828.

== Monuments relating to Evans ==
- A monument in Kings Parade park at Bathurst, New South Wales, commemorating the discovery by Europeans of the Bathurst Plains in 1813. The bronze figurative group at the top of the granite plinth is a statue of George Evans beside a kneeling aborigine, both gazing westward. The central column is flanked by male and female figures representing agriculture and geography. The monument was designed by W. Dryden and executed in bronze by Gilbert Doble. The foundation stone was laid in November 1913 and the completed monument was unveiled on 29 November 1920 by the New South Wales Governor, Sir Walter Davidson.
- A cairn was unveiled in 1978, located on private property near Cowra, marking the site where Evans and his companions first sighted the Lachlan River in May 1815 and named the surrounding district Oxley's Plains. The location of the cairn, installed by the Cowra and District Historical Society, is at the junction of North Logan and Phillips Crossing roads, near a popular swimming spot thirteen kilometres from Cowra.
- Fifteen markers commemorating the first survey by George Evans of a route across the Blue Mountains were installed as part of the 'Footsteps in Time' Bicentenary Project in 1988. Each of the concrete markers are "placed as close to the location of Evan's surveyed line as can be calculated from his original field book". Each individual marker is topped with a plaque labelled "Traverse of George William Evans", showing the particular location by name and geographical co-ordinates and the date of the original survey. Locations of the survey markers include Emu Plains, Faulconbridge and Wentworth Falls West.
- A monument beside the Castlereagh Highway, near the township of Coonamble, commemorates the European discovery of the Castlereagh River by George Evans, a member of John Oxley's 1818 expedition. The plaque, set in concrete against a standing local stone, was erected by the Coonamble Rotary Club. The inscription reads: "The Castlereagh River was discovered 2km south of this point on 11-7-1818 by Surveyor Evans, second in command of Oxley`s exploring expedition".
Memorials related to George Evans
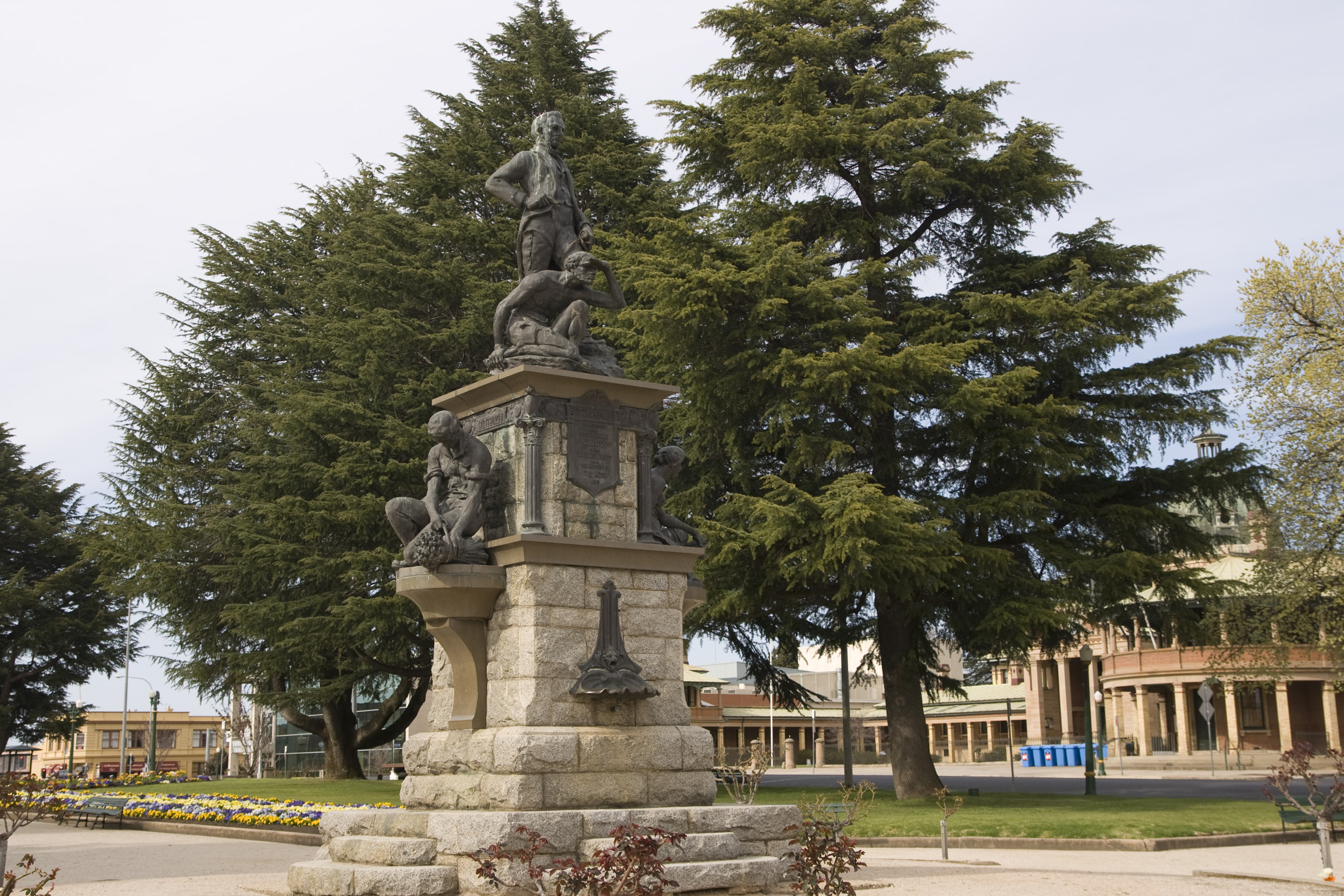
The Evans Monument at Bathurst, New South Wales

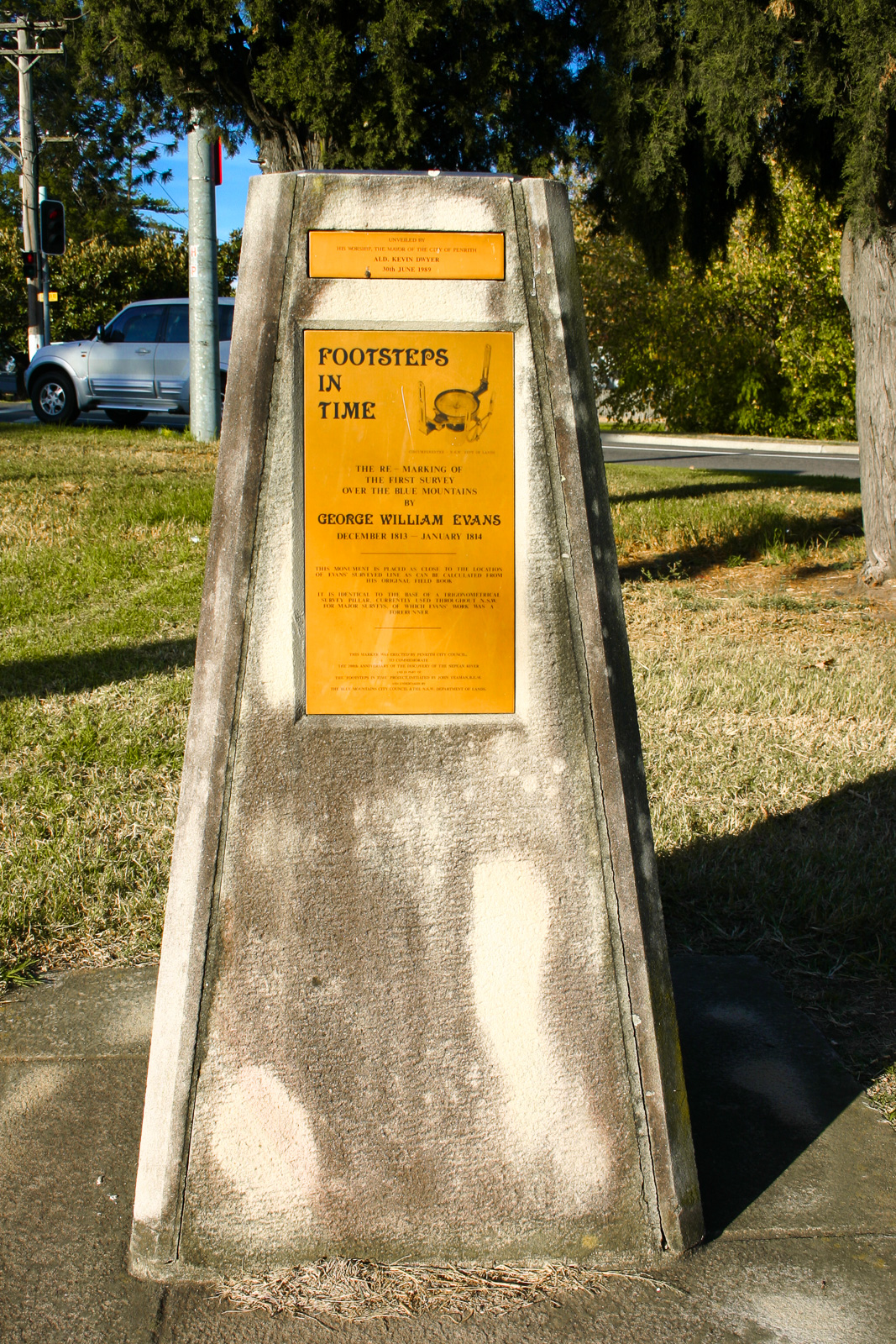
The 'Footsteps in time' survey marker at Emu Plains (unveiled in June 1989)

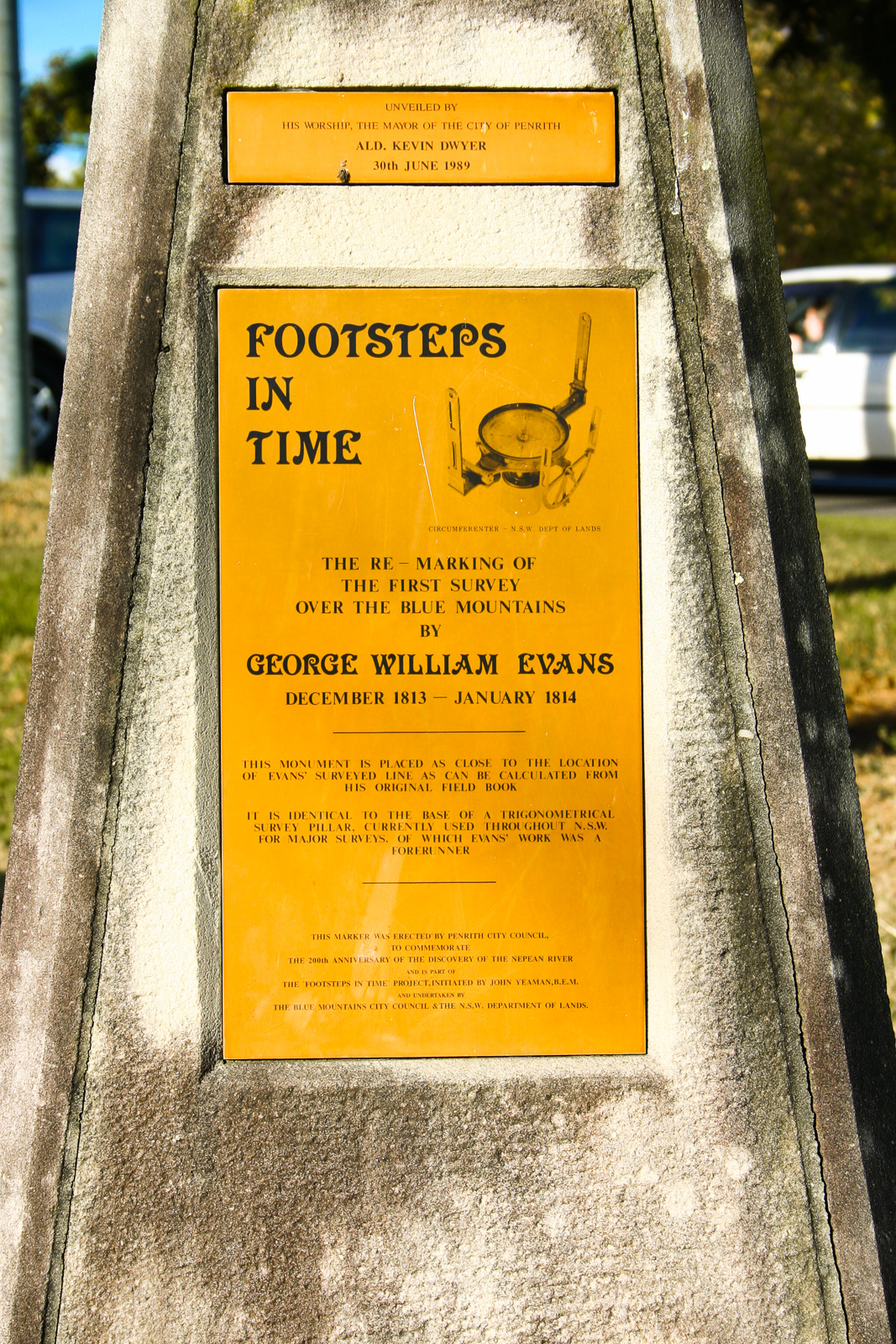
'Footsteps in time' survey marker at Emu Plains (detail)

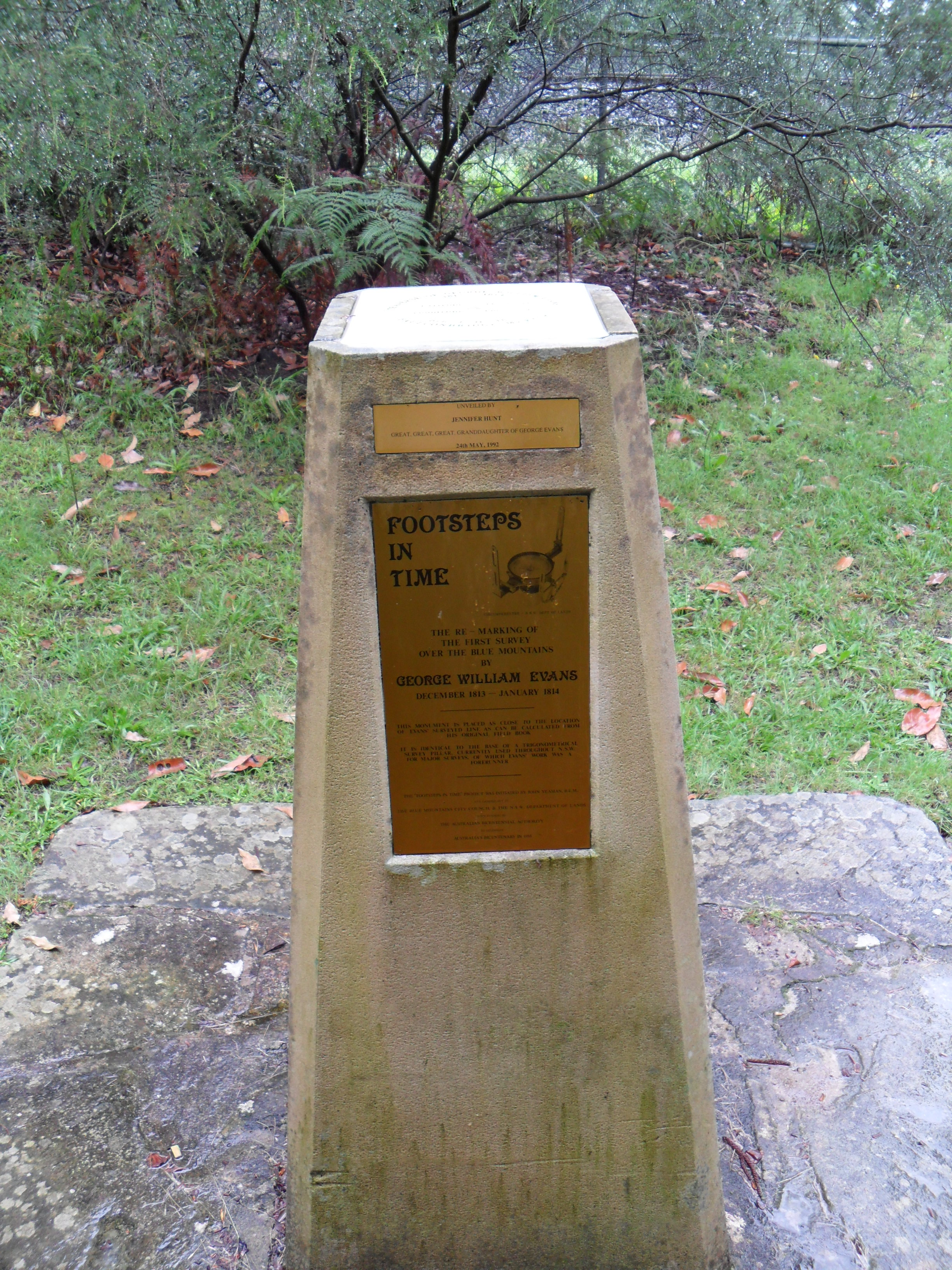
The 'Footsteps in time' survey marker at the 'Corridor of Oaks' at Faulconbridge (unveiled in May 1992)

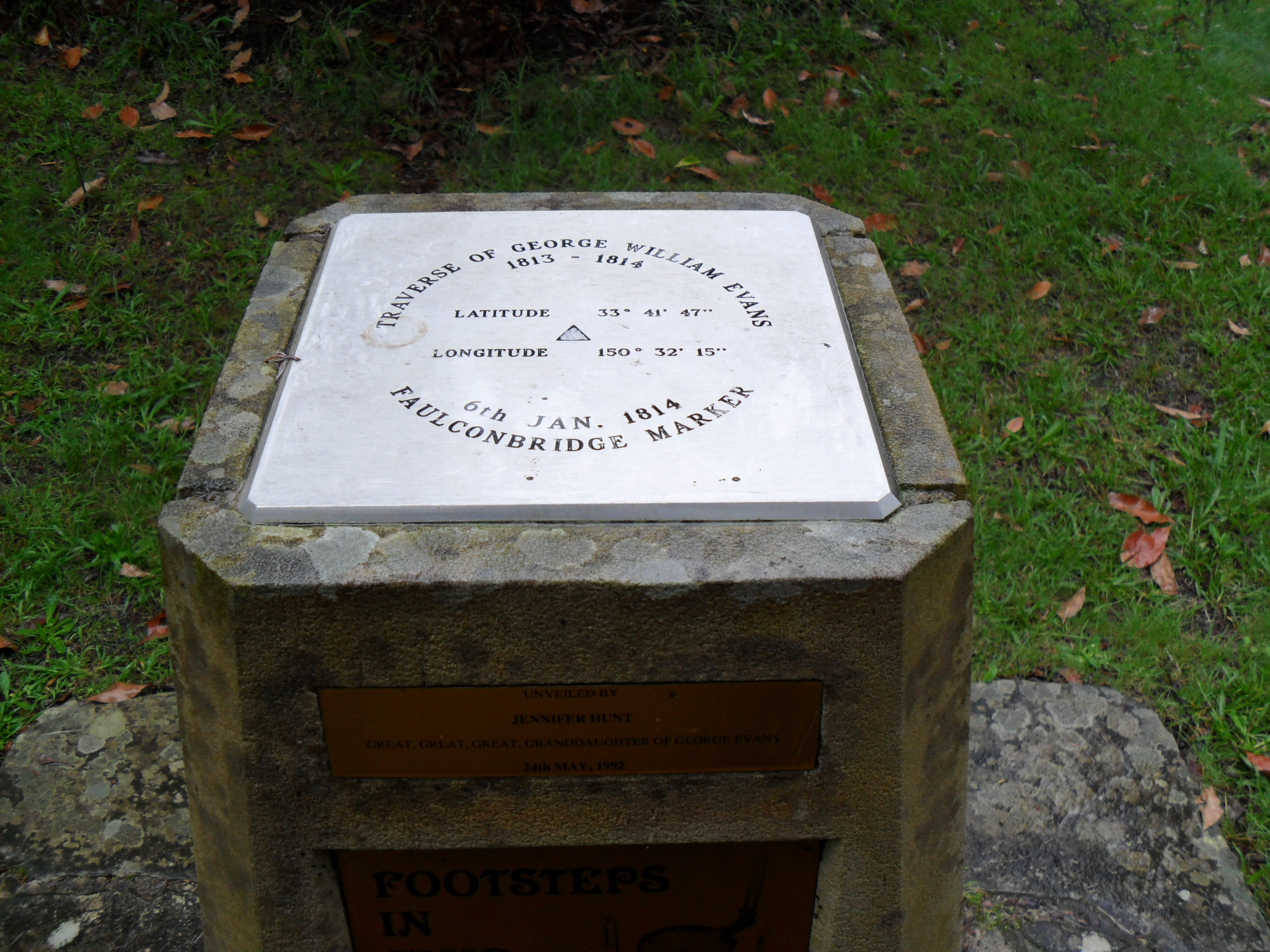
The location and date details of Evans' original survey (at Faulconbridge, New South Wales)

== See also ==
- List of Blue Mountains articles
- Bathurst, New South Wales
- European exploration of Australia
