= Bathurst War =

Wiradjuri resistance to European settlement in Australia

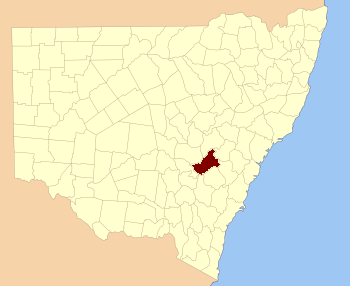
- The Bathurst county in which the war was fought
Date	January 1824 – 28 December 1824
Location	Bathurst, New South Wales, Australia
Result	British victory

Belligerents
(United Kingdom of Great Britain and Ireland) United Kingdom	Wiradjuri

Commanders and leaders
(United Kingdom of Great Britain and Ireland) Governor Thomas Brisbane (United Kingdom of Great Britain and Ireland) Major James Morisset	Windradyne

Strength
(United Kingdom of Great Britain and Ireland) 75 British soldiers (United Kingdom of Great Britain and Ireland) Several cavalry (United Kingdom of Great Britain and Ireland) 200+ armed settlers	1,500 (unable to verify)

Casualties and losses
~20 killed others wounded	~100 killed others wounded

The Bathurst War (1824) was a war in present-day New South Wales, Australia, between the Wiradjuri tribes and the United Kingdom of Great Britain and Ireland. The successful Blaxland, Lawson, and Wentworth expedition of 1813 to find a route through the "impenetrable" Blue Mountains allowed the colony to expand onto the vast fertile plains of the west.

British expansion into the land was initially slow, but following a change of government, Governor Thomas Brisbane came to power allowing a flood of land grants to the west of the Blue Mountains. The enormous influx of British colonists put massive strain on the traditional food sources and sacred landmarks of the Wiradjuri. By early 1824, war had broken out in which the Wiradjuri adopted a guerrilla-style approach. After Governor Brisbane declared martial law, the resistance soon collapsed in late 1824.

== Background ==
=== Blaxland, Wentworth and Lawson ===
Attempts to cross the Blue Mountains had been made from 1790 onwards with convicts seeking a way to escape and adventurers eager to explore the region. However, all of these attempts failed, and it was to be over 20 years before a way across was found. In May 1813, Gregory Blaxland, William Lawson and William Charles Wentworth set out with a plan to find a passage through the impenetrable Blue Mountains. After 21 days of traveling through 50 miles (80 km) of rugged terrain, the party reached Mount Blaxland. From here they saw a vast expanse of forest and grass in which Blaxland wrote was rich enough "to support the stock of the colony for the next thirty years".

This was in fact the land of the Wiradjuri people, one of the largest language groups in Australia. The Wiradjuri inhabited an area bounded by the Blue Mountains in the east, the western slopes in the south, and the change of open forest to grassy plains in the north and west. The tribes led by Windradyne lived in the eastern parts of this territory, connected to the other groups by a common language as well as cultural and trade links.

=== Governor Lachlan Macquarie ===
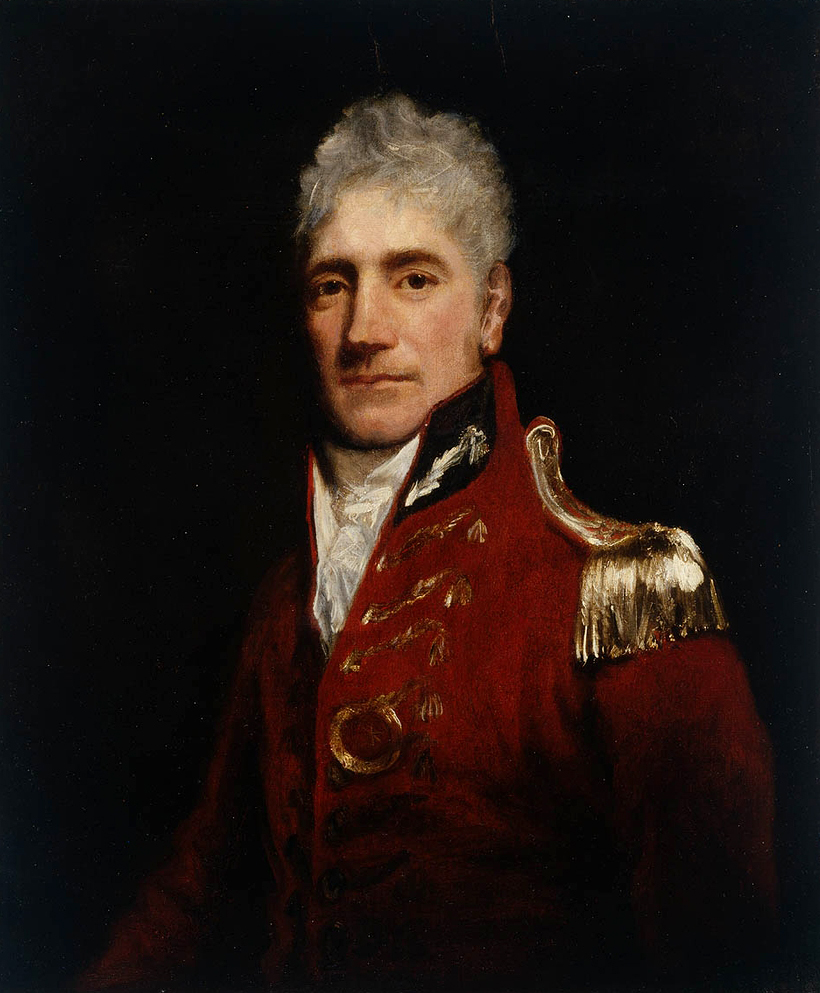
Governor Lachlan Macquarie

After passage through the Blue Mountains had been secured, assistant surveyor George Evans and his party had been instructed to further explore the country. Evans' reports confirmed of excellent pastures beyond the mountains to which Governor Macquarie ordered a road be built from the Nepean River. In less than six months the 100-mile (160 km) road had been completed. Soon after Governor Lachlan Macquarie and a large accompanying party set out to view the country. The journey took nine days by coach from Parramatta and on arrival Macquarie's welcoming ceremony was observed by seven Wiradjuri.

Macquarie wrote:

"We found here also three male natives and four boys of this newly discovered tract of country, who showed great surprise, mixed with no small degree of fear, at seeing so many strangers, horses and carriages but to whom they soon appeared to be reconciled on being kindly spoken to. They were all clothed with Mantles made of the skins of o'possums which were neatly sewn together and the outside of the skins were carved in a remarkably neat manner. They appear to be very inoffensive and cleanly in their persons."

Three days later Macquarie inaugurated the town of Bathurst, then continued to tour the surrounding country. In his journal, Macquarie writes of being visited by three male natives and that "to the best looking and stoutest of them I gave a piece of yellow cloth in exchange for his mantle, which he presented me with". It has been theorized that this unknown Wiradjuri man may have been Windradyne, but this cannot be proven. Nevertheless, it would be another eight years before he would become famous to the colony. In 1820, the population of Bathurst was only 114 due to Macquarie's slow and cautious approach to new settlement. His experience of the Hawkesbury and Nepean Wars of 1795–1816 may also have made him hesitant to start a new conflict. It seems that the Wiradjuri were willing to tolerate this slow level of growth and peaceful relations were maintained during this period.

=== Governor Thomas Brisbane ===
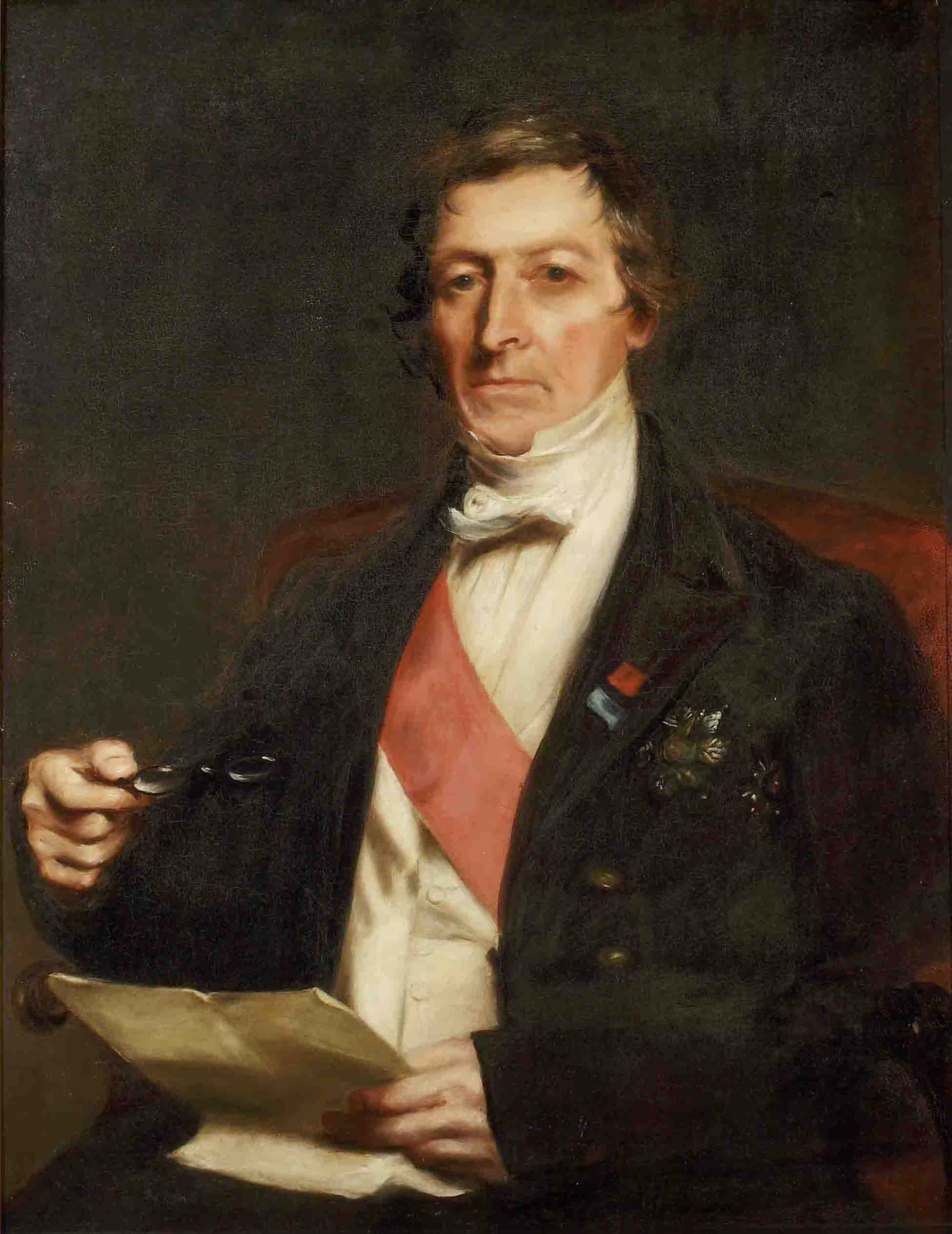
Governor Thomas Brisbane

Macquarie offered his resignation several times, due to undermining forces within his own government, and in late 1820 his third application was accepted. His replacement was Governor Thomas Brisbane, who formally took over on 1 December 1821. Brisbane who had different views through which he began asserting his authority. Under Brisbane, land settlement laws were changed leading to a flood of land grants across the Blue Mountains. An enormous influx of the British onto the Wiradjuri lands put great strain on traditional food sources, and destroyed some of the Wiradjuri social and sacred sites. In response, the Wiradjuri resistance was born. Well aware that they had no chance against guns, they adopted a guerrilla-warfare approach, in which attacks were made against outlying and undefended stations.

=== Pre-war violence ===
Following Governor Brisbane's decision to open the flood gates to the west of the Blue Mountains, various attacks were soon made against the growing settlement. In 1822, Wiradjuri warriors attacked a station on the Cudgegong River in which they drove away the stockman, let the cattle out of the yard and killed several of the sheep. More attacks followed with the murder of convict hut-keepers, scattered herds and speared cattle. Stockmen were intimidated and would not leave their huts to round up the cattle and bring them in without protection. The government centre at Swallow Creek was soon abandoned in fear of attack. In late 1823, Windradyne (known as Saturday by the British) was captured for the first time.

The Sydney Gazette described the situation in the following:

Advices from Bathurst say that the natives have been very troublesome in that country. Numbers of cattle have been killed. In justification of their conduct, the natives urge that the white men have driven away all the kangaroos and opossums, and the black men must now have beef!... The strength of these men is amazing. One of the chiefs (named Saturday) of a desperate tribe, took six men to secure him and they had actually to break a musket over his body before he yielded, which he did at length with broken ribs... Saturday for his exploits was sentenced to a month's imprisonment.

== Course of the war ==
=== Potato Field Incident ===
In early 1824, on the river flats opposite the town of Bathurst, a farmer, Antonio Hose Rodrigues, in a friendly gesture offered a group of passing Wiradjuri people some potatoes. The next day the families returned to the field, however, with no concept of private ownership of food supplies they began helping themselves. The farmer then fired upon the group and in the mayhem several Wurudjuri people were killed and some wounded. One of the survivors of this misunderstanding was Windradyne; enraged at the attack he and his warriors immediately began a series of violent attacks against nearby stations.

One settler account describes an encounter that took place soon after the Potato Field Incident:

Our hut was one day surrounded by a large party of blacks, fully equipped for war, under the leadership of their great fierce chief and warrior, named by the whites ‘Saturday’. There was no means of resistance so my father, then a lad of eighteen years, met them fearlessly at the door. He spoke to them in their own language in such a manner as not to let them suppose he anticipated any evil from them. They stood there, sullen, silent, motionless. My father's cheerful courage and friendly tone disarmed animosity. They consulted in an undertone, and departed as sullenly and noiselessly as they came. The next thing known of them is that they killed... all the men at a settler's place some miles distant, the very place where it was rumoured, the poisoned bread had been laid for them.

=== Revenge attacks ===
Similar attacks occurred nearby, at "The Mill" and "Warren Gunyah". These attacks included men being speared, weapons stolen, buildings burned, and stock killed. While Windradyne and his warriors engaged the area north-east of Bathurst, to the south related tribes also attacked, terrorising settlers and driving off cattle. Revenge parties were formed in which a group of armed servants attacked and killed three Wiradjuri women. For several months the attacks by the Wiradjuri continued; they struck at unexpected locations then retreated back to the bush. By August 1824, the Sydney Gazette described it as "to have exposed the strength and wealth of the Colony... to destruction".

=== Proclamation of martial law ===
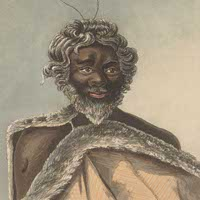
Windradyne

On 14 August Governor Brisbane issued a proclamation of martial law. Governor Brisbane's declaration read:

WHEREAS THE ABORIGINAL NATIVES of the Districts near Bathurst have for many Weeks past carried on a Series of indiscriminate Attacks on the Stock Station there, putting some of the Keepers to cruel Deaths, wounding others, and dispersing and plundering the Flocks and Herds; themselves not escaping sanguinary Retaliations. AND WHEREAS the ordinary Powers of the CIVIL MAGISTRATES (although most anxiously exerted) have failed to protect the Lives of HIS MAJESTY'S Subjects; and every conciliatory Measure has been pursued in vain; and the Slaughter of Black Women and Children and Unoffending White Men, as well as of the lawless Objects of Terror, continue to threaten the before mentioned Districts; AND WHEREAS by Experience, it hath been found that mutual Bloodshed may be stopped by the Use of Arms against the Natives beyond the ordinary Rule of Law in Time of Peace, and for this End Resort to summary Justice has become necessary: NOW THEREFORE, by Virtue of the Authority in me vested by His Majesty's Royal Commission, I do declare, in Order to restore Tranquillity, MARTIAL LAW TO BE IN ALL THE COUNTRY WESTWARD OF MOUNT YORK; And all Soldiers are hereby ordered to assist and obey their lawful Superiors in suppressing the Violences aforesaid; and all His Majesty's Subjects are also called upon to assist the MAGISTRATES in executing such Measures, as any one or more of the said Magistrates shall direct to be taken for the same purpose, by such Ways and Means as are expedient, so long as Martial Law shall last; being always mindful that the Shedding of Blood is only just, where all other Means of Defence or of Peace are exhausted; that Cruelty is never Lawful; and that, when personal Attacks become necessary, the helpless Women and Children are to be spared."

A 75-strong detachment of the 40th Regiment of Foot under the command of Major James Thomas Morisset was sent to garrison Bathurst. Bolstered by a local settler militia, the detachment began conducting several sweeps across the landscape to restore order and enforce martial law. However, these proved to have little impact on Wiradjuri or settler activities; according to historian W. H. Suttor, "The proclamation of martial law was as undecipherable to the natives as an Egyptian hieroglyph".

The Wiradjuri continued to launch attacks on the settlers, engaging in numerous skirmishes which were consistently followed by settler reprisals, typically on Aboriginal warriors attempting to bury their casualties. However, the majority of Wiradjuri casualties during the conflict were non-combatants, who were killed by mounted settler patrols or deliberately poisoned by the settlers. In October, the Sydney Gazette summed up the situation by stating that "Bathurst and its surrounding vicinity is engaged in an exterminating war".

=== Battle of Bathurst ===
The Battle of Bathurst began on 10 September when a Wiradjuri war party attacked a station on the Cudgegong River, they drove off the cattle before being pursued by the station hands. In an ambush, the stationhands were chased back and in the retreat, three Wiradjuri warriors were shot. The following day the station hands returned to find the war parties' camp deserted as they were burying their dead, however most of the weapons were left in the camp and were subsequently destroyed. As the Wiradjuri returned to the war camp, the station hands fired on them killing at least 16 and wounding many more.

=== Peace ===
At the outset of martial law, Windradyne's people had been informed that military operations against them would continue until their leaders were given up. Windradyne himself had a reward of 500 acres of land upon his head. By late 1824, large numbers of Wiradjuri were surrendering themselves to the government. However, Windradyne continued to elude attempts to find him, and as such martial law remained in place for a further seven weeks. On 11 December 1824, martial law was finally repealed, and on 28 December Windradyne appeared at the head of his people in Parramatta to attend the Governor's annual feast. He wore the word "peace" on his hat and knew the British could not arrest him because of the possibility of a riot with so many aboriginals there.

The Sydney Gazette described Windradyne as:

...one of the finest looking natives we have seen in this part of the country. He is not particularly tall but much stouter and more proportionable limbed than the majority of his countrymen; which combined with a noble looking countenance and piercing eye, are calculated to impress the beholder with other than disagreeable feelings towards a character who has been so much dreaded by the Bathurst settler. Saturday is, without doubt, the most manly native we have ever beheld.

== Aftermath ==
On 13 December 1824 Governor Brisbane wrote a letter to Major J.T. Morisset, Commandant at Bathurst, thanking him for effecting 'the purpose of the proclamation...by the judicious measures taken by you and the other magistrates at Bathurst, the aboriginal natives have learned to respect our power.' He goes on to say that 'it is impossible perhaps at all times to prevent the infliction of injury upon them by individuals and...if justice cannot always be done, it deserves consideration upon such occasion whether the wrong may not be repaired by compensation. For this service and for rewards to the natives who assisted in the police, I have directed £50 subject to detailed accounts of its expenditure to be at your disposal.'

Colonel William Stewart, appointed Head of NSW Police and Lt Governor of the Colony helped oversee some of the government response to the Bathurst Uprising. His reward was to stand on a high point (Mount Pleasant) at the edge of Bathurst township and declare his right to all the land he could see. Governor Darling formalized the grant of 3200 acres in 1826. It included unlimited and unrestricted water rights to the Macquarie River. The historical records, original deeds and agreements are held by the family at "Strath" Bathurst. Today the great wealth that came to Stewart and his descendants continues to be seen in the form of Abercrombie House that was later built on the land grant.

At the conclusion of the war, the NSW colonial government also recognized the need to have a mounted infantry to effectively place the frontier under British control. Foot soldiers were proven to be an inadequate force on the wide plains of the interior. As a result, in 1825, Colonel Stewart formed the NSW Mounted Police. This force, which was manned with soldiers not civilians, initially consisted of two detachments, one stationed in Bathurst and the other at Maitland. The NSW Mounted Police became the principal instrument of enforcement of colonial rule on the frontier for the next 15 years.
