= Explorers tree =

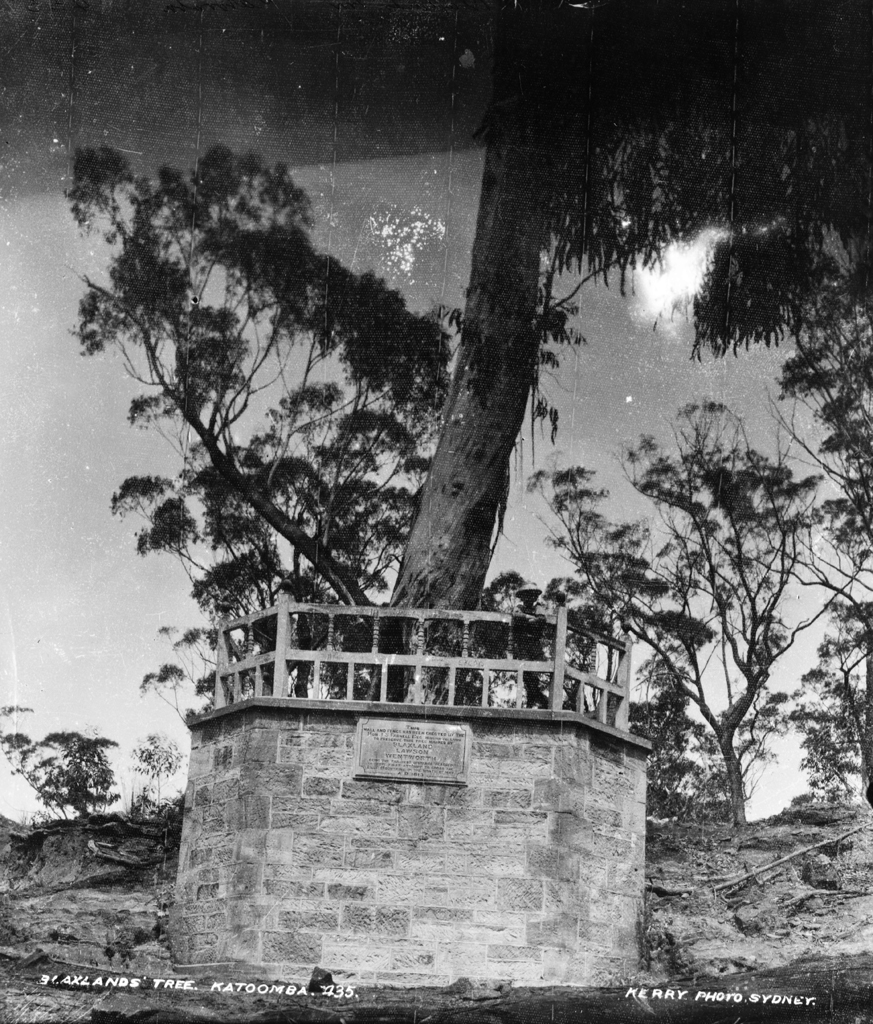
- Explorers Tree, Katoomba
- Interactive map of Explorers tree
- 33°42′13″S 150°17′27″E

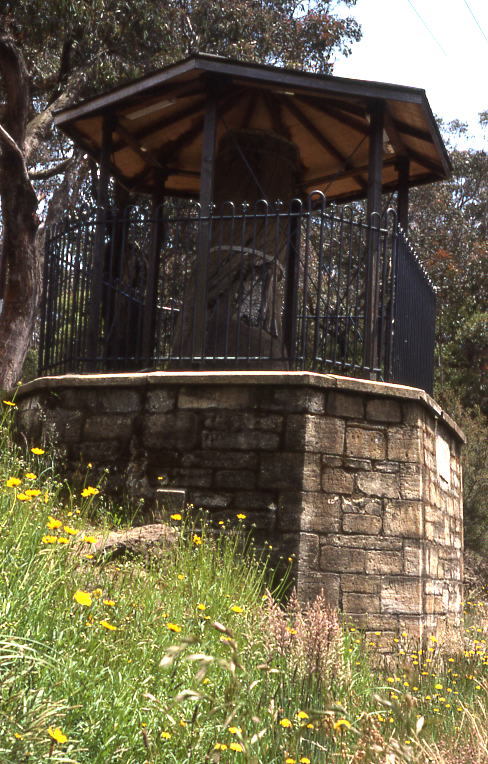
The tree in 2008.

The Explorers Tree was a Blue Mountains ash (Eucalyptus oreades) formerly located at Explorers Hill (also described as Pulpit Hill), about 2 km north-west of Katoomba, New South Wales, Australia.

== History ==
The tree is regarded as the one on which Gregory Blaxland, William Lawson and William Charles Wentworth, the explorers who achieved the first known successful crossing of the Blue Mountains of New South Wales by European settlers, carved their initials in 1813. The claim is not universally supported however. Further, the tree was not actually mentioned in the explorer's journals and the first recorded mention of it was not until 1867.

The tree died in the 1950s, but the stump of the tree, about 3 metres high and smeared with concrete, remains, located adjacent to the Great Western Highway. The stump was then protected from the weather and vandalism by a roof and a fence.

In 2005, the tree was subject to an arson attack and was slightly charred. In 2012, a car crashed into the tree base from the highway and severely damaged its stone wall foundations and the roof.

In August 2018, a state government heritage grant was awarded to Blue Mountains City Council to preserve what is left of the tree, as well as provide a better understanding of the place including Aboriginal perspectives. The council had deemed an imminent risk of the collapse of the tree's platform due to traffic on the Great Western Highway. Subsequently, the highway was closed, and the remnants of the tree, along with the supports and fence, were removed by Transport for NSW on 20 February 2021. The remnants are now being stored at the Transport for NSW Lawson Precinct.

== See also ==
- List of individual trees
