= Rex Morgan =

Rex Morgan may refer to:

- Rex Morgan, M.D., American comic strip
- Rex Morgan (basketball) (1948–2016), American former basketball player
- Rex Henry Morgan, founder of The Pittwater House Schools
