= Abercrombie House =

Mansion in Bathurst, New South Wales, Australia

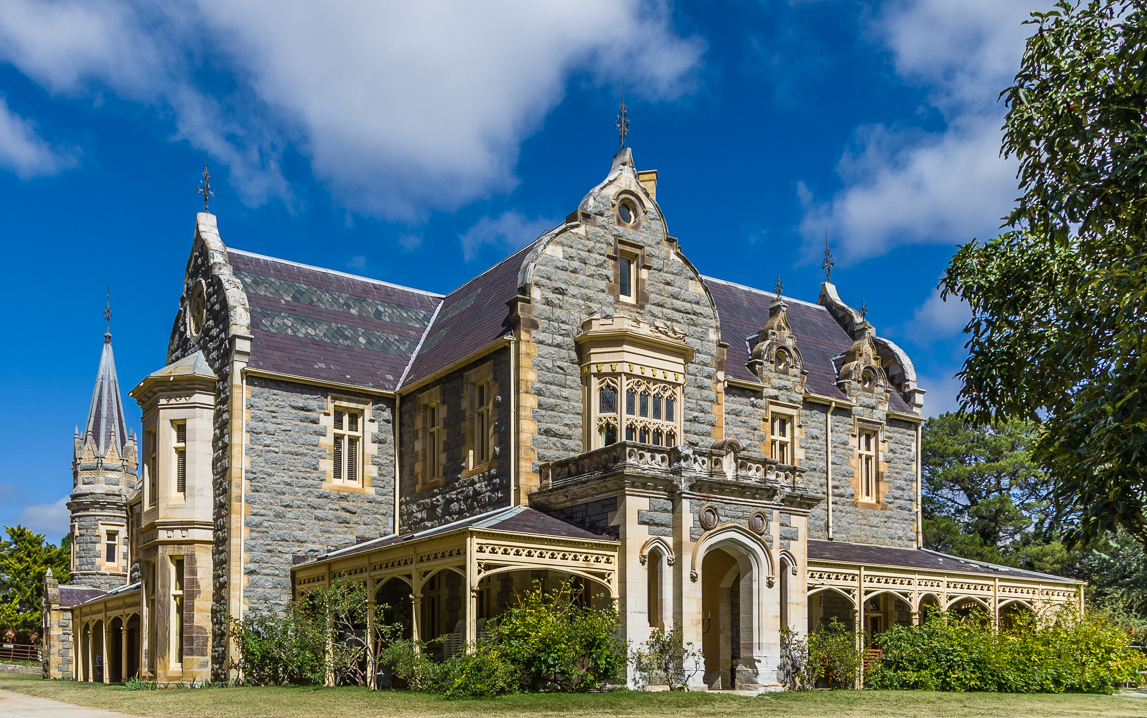
- The house in 2018

- Location within New South Wales
- Former names: The Mount

General information
- Status: Completed
- Type: House/Mansion
- Architectural style: Victorian Tudor
- Location: near Bathurst, New South Wales, Australia
- Coordinates: 33°23′33″S 149°31′06″E
- Year built: 1870–1870
- Client: James Stewart
- Owner: Rex Morgan and family

Technical details
- Floor count: 2 (plus basement)
- Grounds: 20 ha (50 acres)

Design and construction
- Architecture firm: Mansfield Brothers

Other information
- Parking: Yes; Wednesday to Sunday; (weekends only, during August)
- Public transit: Nil

Website
- abercrombiehouse.com.au

New South Wales Heritage Register
- Official name: Abercrombie House
- Type: Registered place
- Criteria: a, b, c, f, g
- Designated: 5 December 2006
- Reference no.: 1080302
- Collection: Residential buildings (private)
- Category: Homestead building

Register of the National Estate
- Official name: Abercrombie House
- Type: Defunct register
- Designated: 21 March 1978
- Reference no.: 777

Abercrombie House is a heritage-listed historic house and house museum located in Bathurst, New South Wales, Australia. It was constructed in the 1870s by the Stewart family, pioneers in the Bathurst region.

Considered to be of historical significance, the house was added to the New South Wales Heritage Register on 5 December 2006. It was also added to non-statutory lists by the NSW branch of the National Trust and the now defunct Register of the National Estate on 21 March 1978, where it was described as "an outstanding example of Victorian Tudor style architecture. It is built of granite with sandstone dressing to the quoins and window surrounds, and there are two storeys together with an attic floor. The building's most striking feature is its array of curvilinear parapeted gables topped by iron finials."

== History ==
Colonel William Stewart arrived in the penal Colony of New South Wales from England in 1825 as the Lieutenant-Governor of New South Wales. As a reward for his service to the Colony, in 1827 Stewart was granted land in Bathurst, and his eldest son, James, built Abercrombie House.

The 20-hectare (50-acre) land and house is currently owned by Rex Morgan AM, MBE and his family. Since 1969 the Morgan family has made major restorations to the house. The house is currently occupied by Christopher Morgan and his family.

=== Stewart family ===
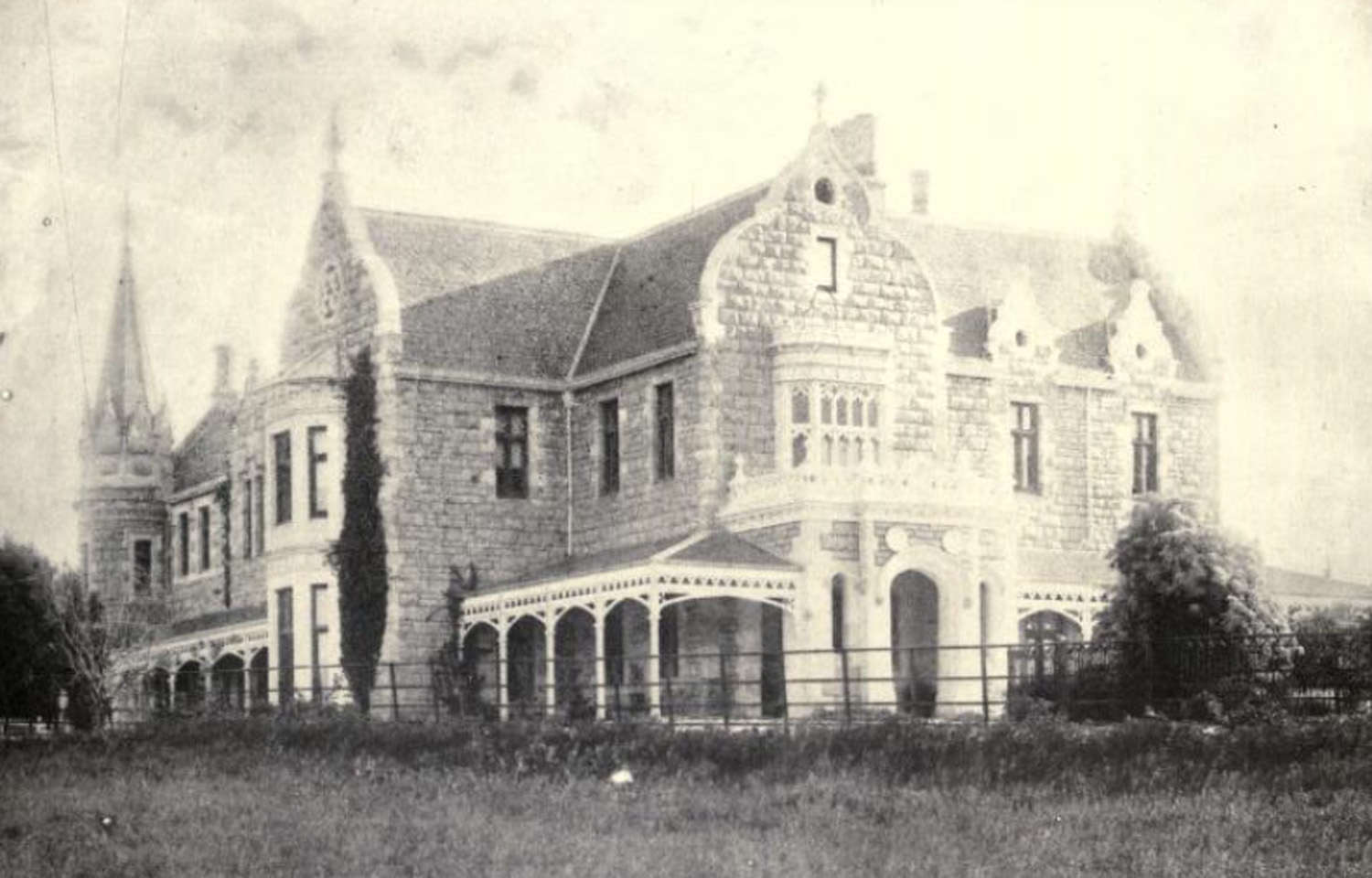
The house, from the 1893 brochure

James Horne Stewart, the son of William, built Abercrombie House in 1878. It was then called “The Mount” and took eight years to construct. A photo taken 15 years after its construction was included in an 1893 brochure on Bathurst. James lived there until his death in 1920 when he was 95 years of age.

James was born in 1825 in Edinburgh, Scotland. He came with his family to Australia at the age of ten in 1835. In 1855 he married at Toxteth Park in Sydney Harriet Eliza Boyce who was the daughter of the Rev. William Boyce, a prominent clergyman. The couple had five children, three sons and two daughters.

Over the years James had many tenant farmers and several newspaper articles mentioned his kindness as a landlord. In times of drought he cut the rents by half so that the families did not endure undue hardship.

When James died in 1920 his son Athol took over the management of the property. Athol was born at Abercrombie House in 1867. He married Frances Helen McDougall (called Helen) in 1905. A photo of her is shown below in the gallery. On the death of his wife in 1927, Athol shut the house down and moved to Sydney. The house remained empty and gradually fell into decline until it was bought by the Morgan family.

==== Entrance gates ====
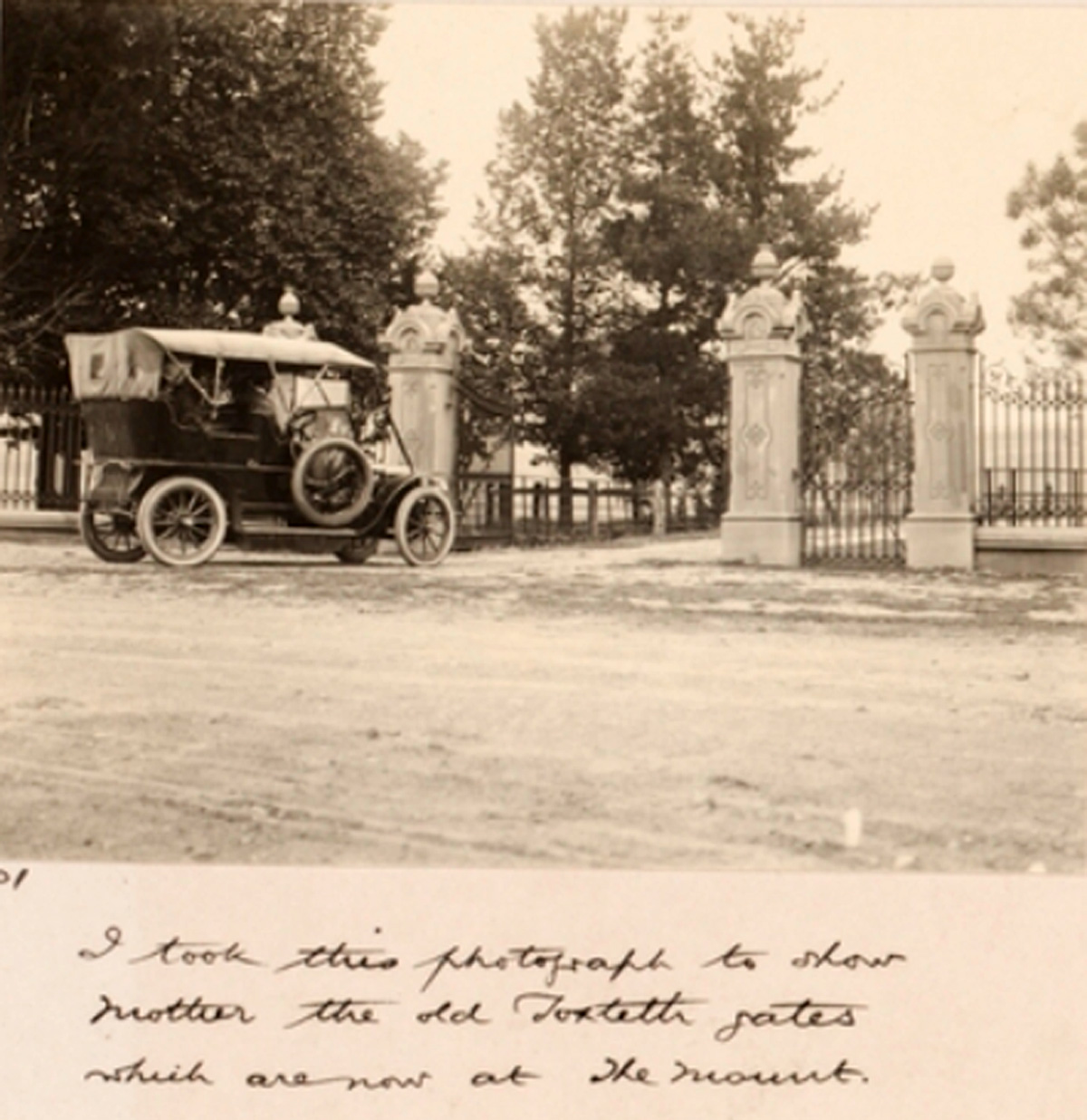
Abercrombie gates in 1909 with note about Toxteth Park.

The secondary gates at Abercrombie House are much older than the house which was built in 1870. They were brought from Toxteth Park in Sydney which is now the site of St Scholastica's College. Toxteth Park was built in 1829 as the home of Sir George Wigram Allen, the brother-in-law of Harriet Stewart, the wife of James Horne Stewart. Toxteth Park was sold in 1901 to the Good Samaritan Sisters and they wished to bring the gates from their old convent in Pitt Street, Sydney, which was being demolished. The gates from Toxteth Park were no longer needed so they were transported to Abercrombie House. In the early 1900s, Arthur Wigram Allen, Harriet's nephew, visited his relatives at Abercrombie House. Arthur's mother Lady (Marian) Allen was Harriet's sister. Arthur photographed the gates mentioning that they were from Toxteth Park.

=== Morgan family ===
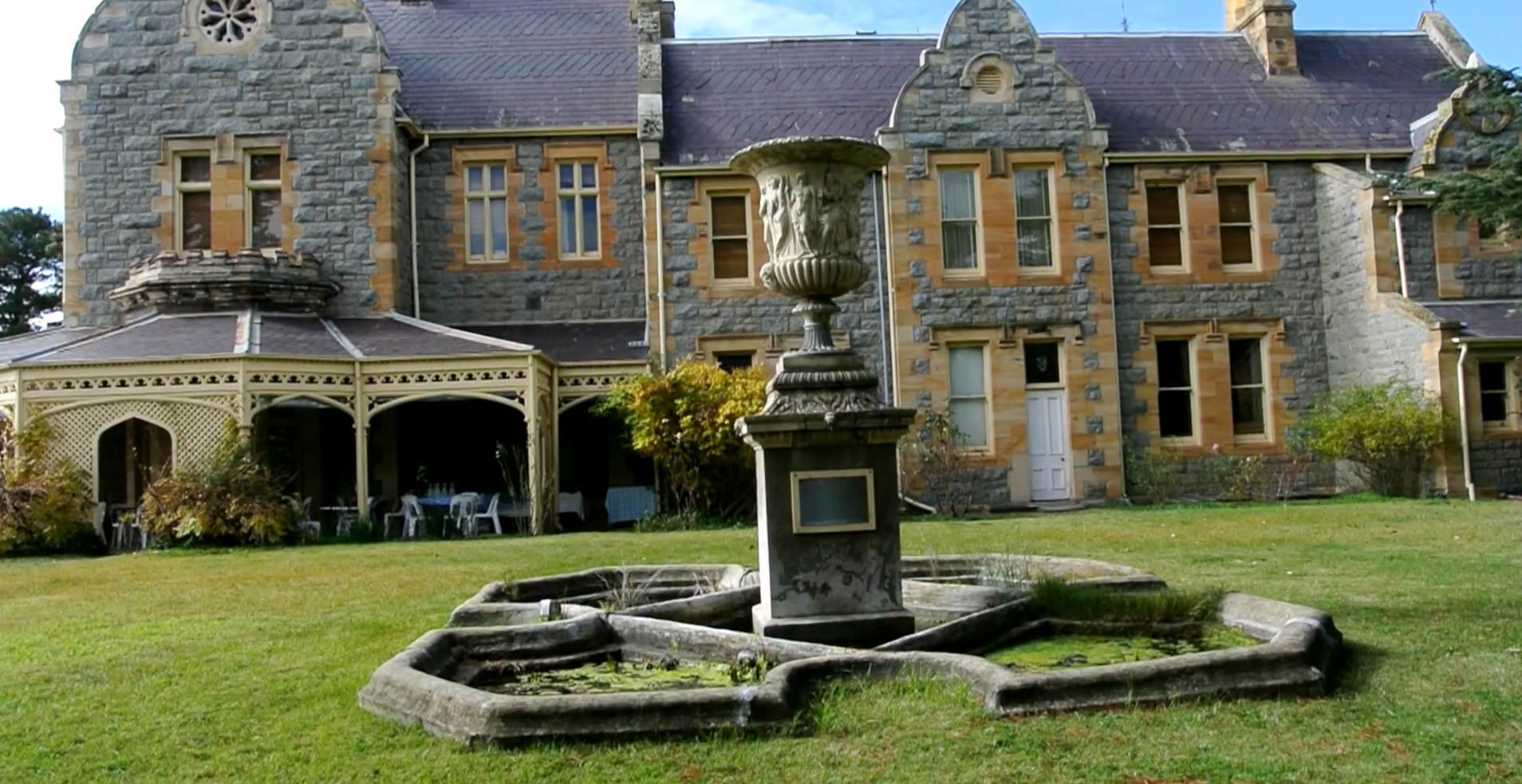
The garden in winter, 2015

The house was bought from James Stewart's great grandson in late 1968 by Rex Morgan and his wife, Mary. Morgan is a widely noted and three-times nationally-honoured educationalist. A condition of the sale was that the name of the house be changed resulting in Morgans selection of ‘Abercrombie House’. This was a reference both to the former shire of that name in which the property was situated and to General Sir Ralph Abercrombie, under whom William Stewart had served in the 1790s in the West Indies. The Morgans embarked on a complete restoration of the house and property. In 1969 they commenced a programme of public heritage tours of the house which has continued today.

== Gallery ==
Arthur Wigram Allen was a prominent lawyer in Sydney and is remembered for the numerous photographs he took which are held by the NSW State Library. An exhibition of some of them called “An Edwardian Summer” was held in 2010-11 at the Sydney Museum. When he visited his Aunt at Abercrombie House in this Edwardian era he took some photos of the property which are shown.

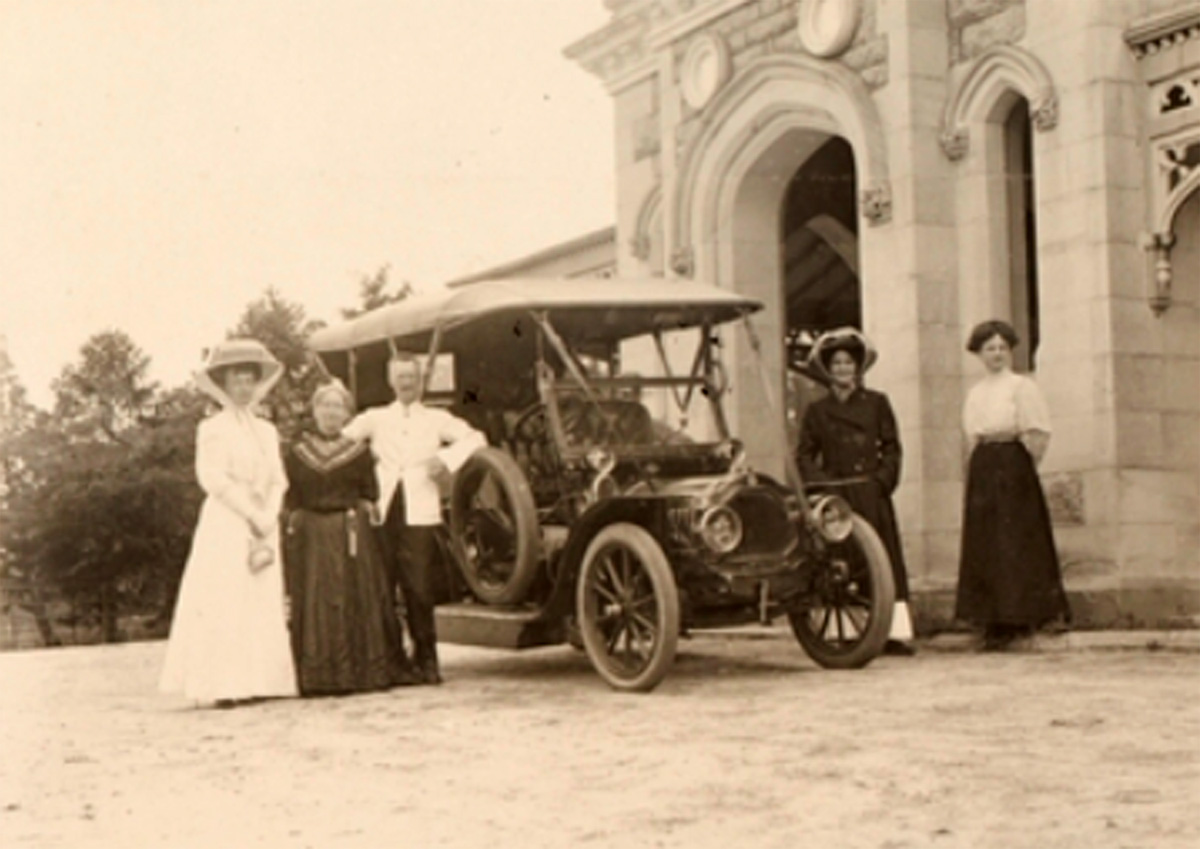
From left to right, Ethel Allen (Arthur Allen's wife), Harriet Stewart, Albyn Stewart (Harriet's son), Helen Austin (a friend of the Allens) and Miss Lindsay, at the house, 1909

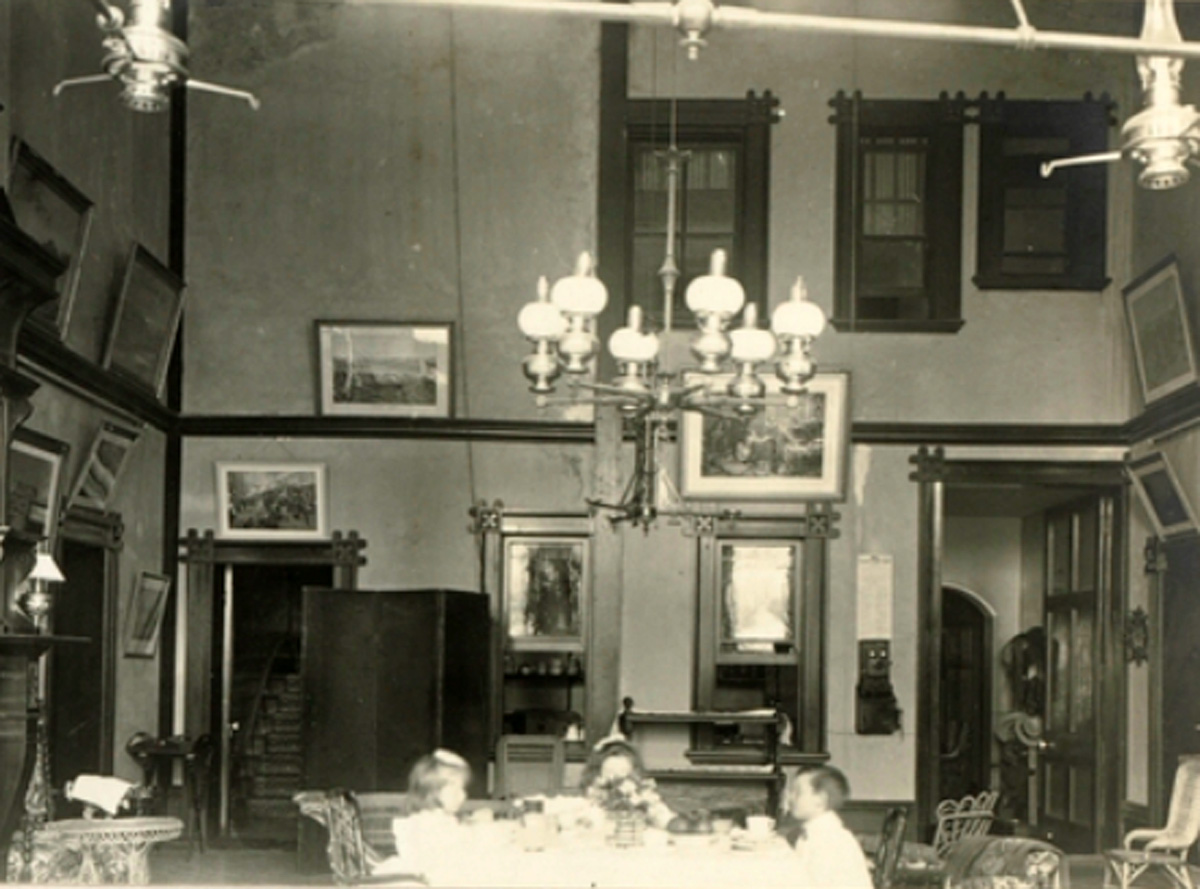
A room in the house, 1901

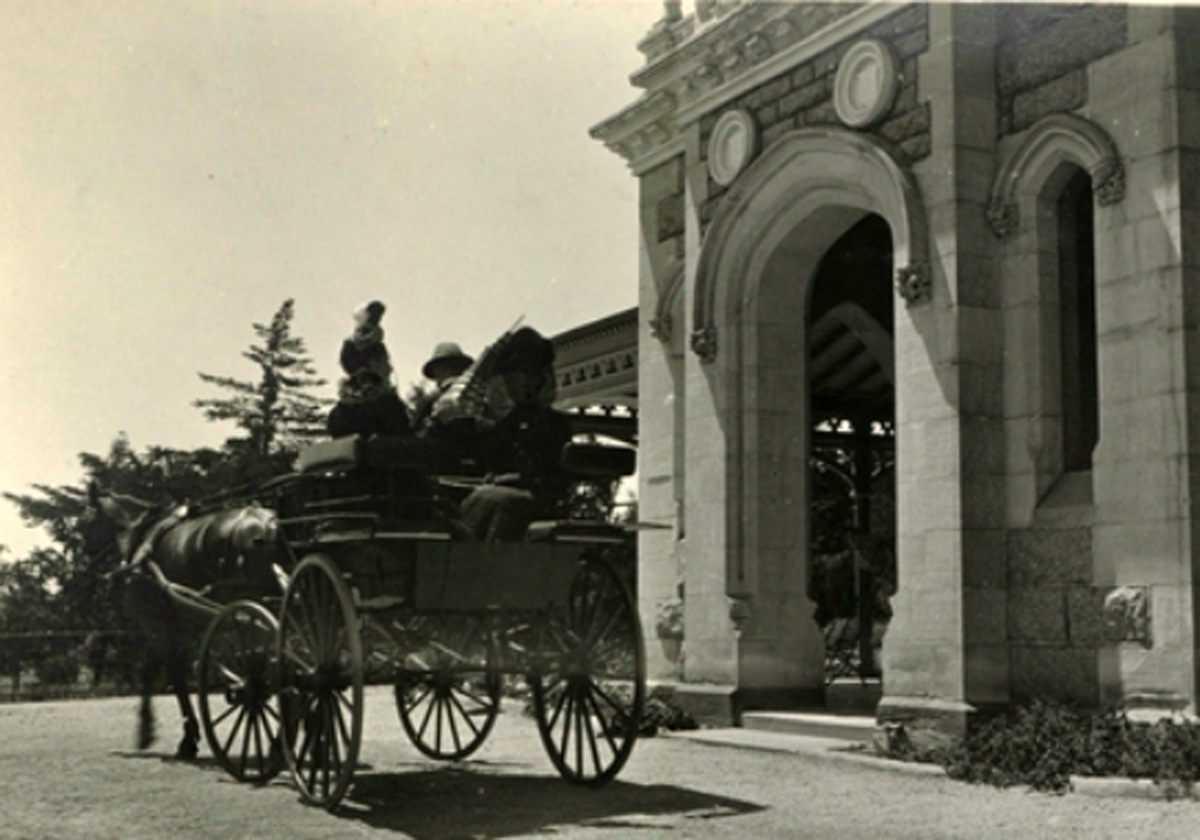
A carriage outside the house, 1901

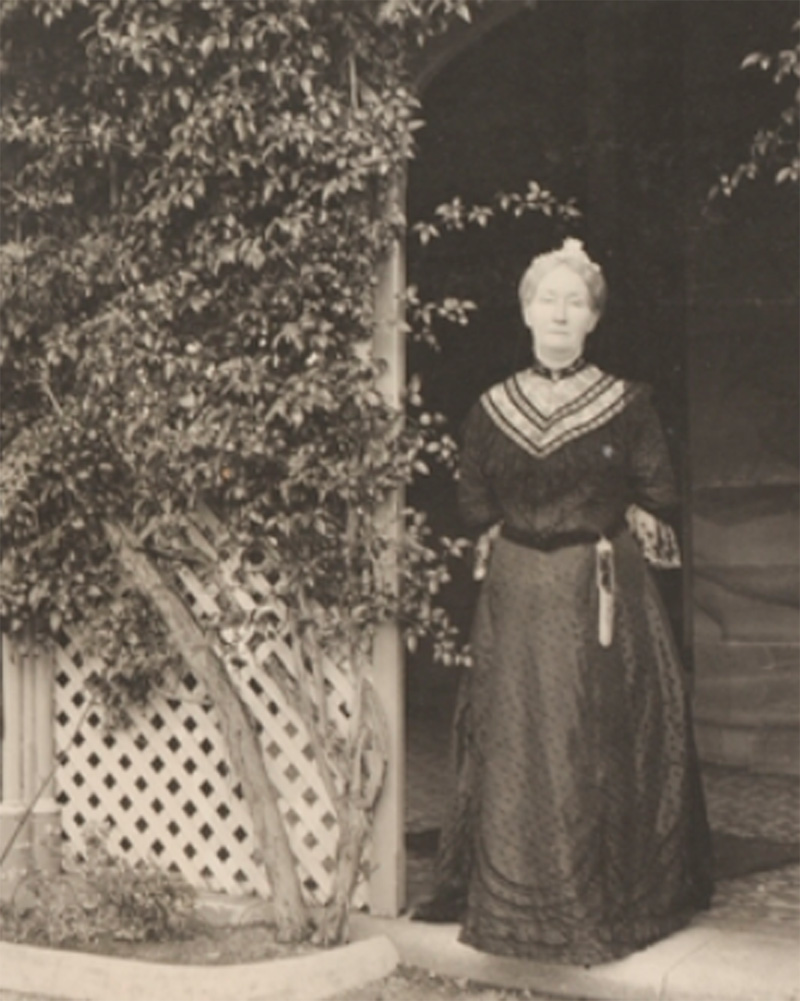
Harriet Stewart in 1909

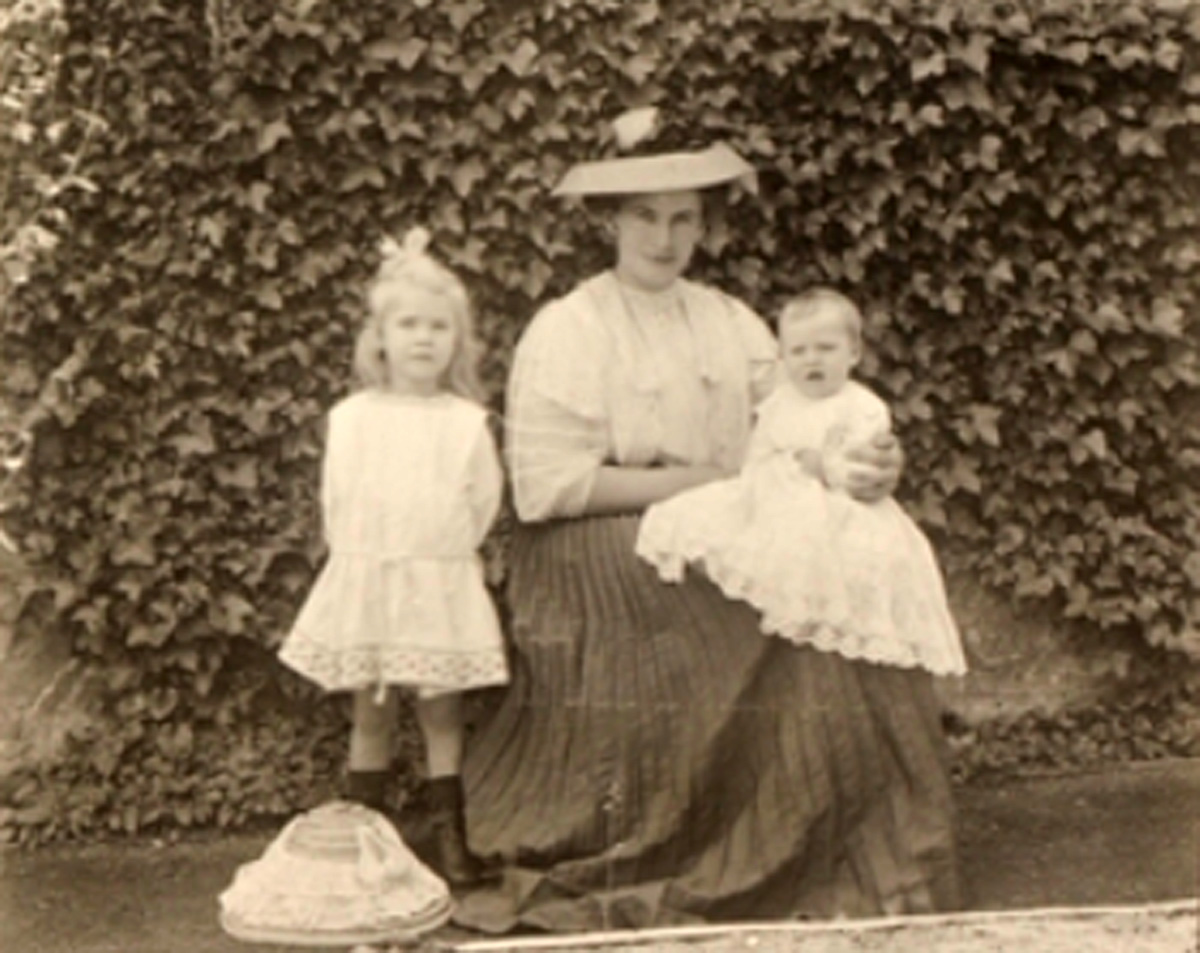
Frances Helen Stewart (called Helen), wife of Athol Stewart, 1909

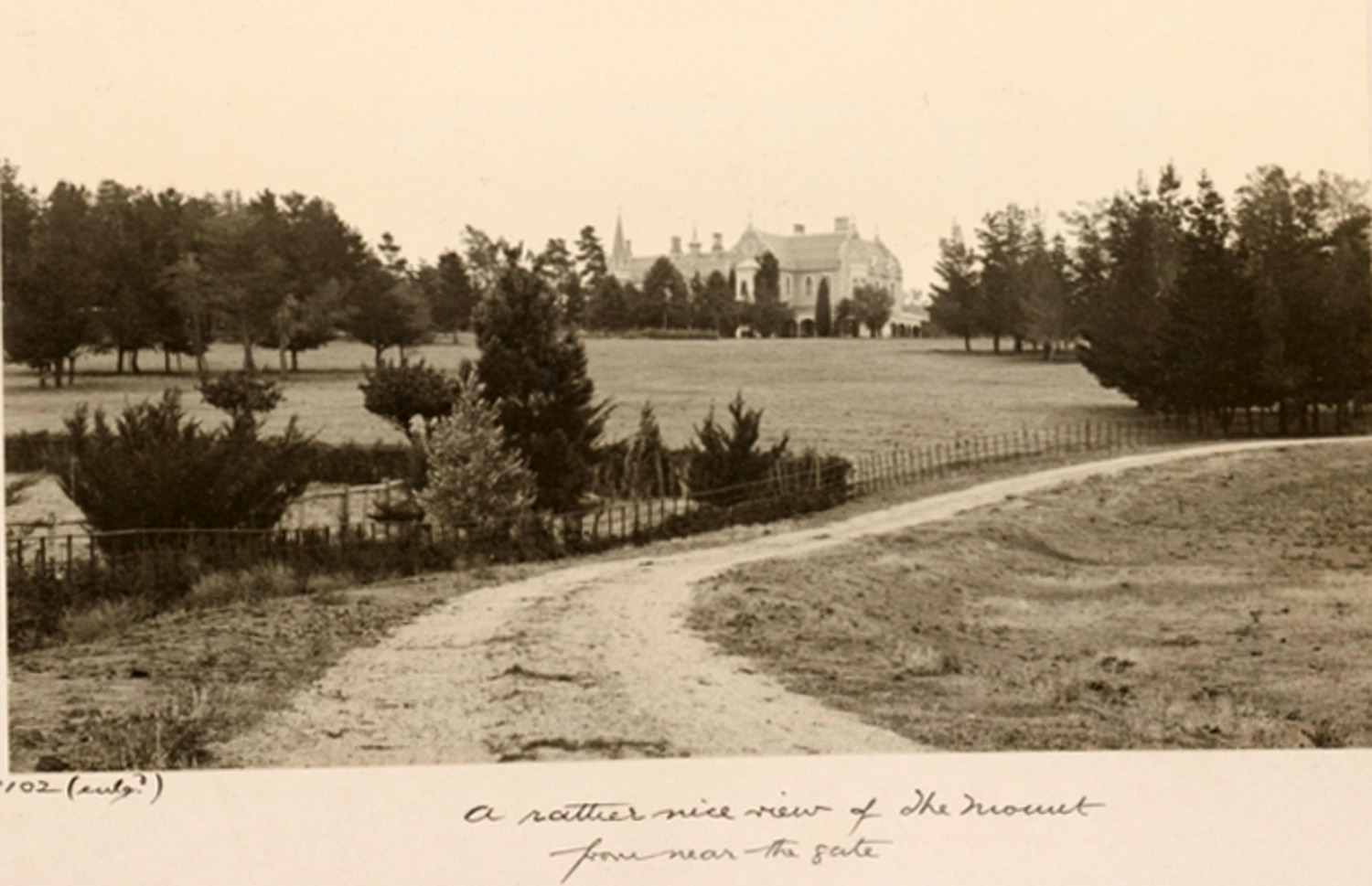
Distant view of the house, 1909

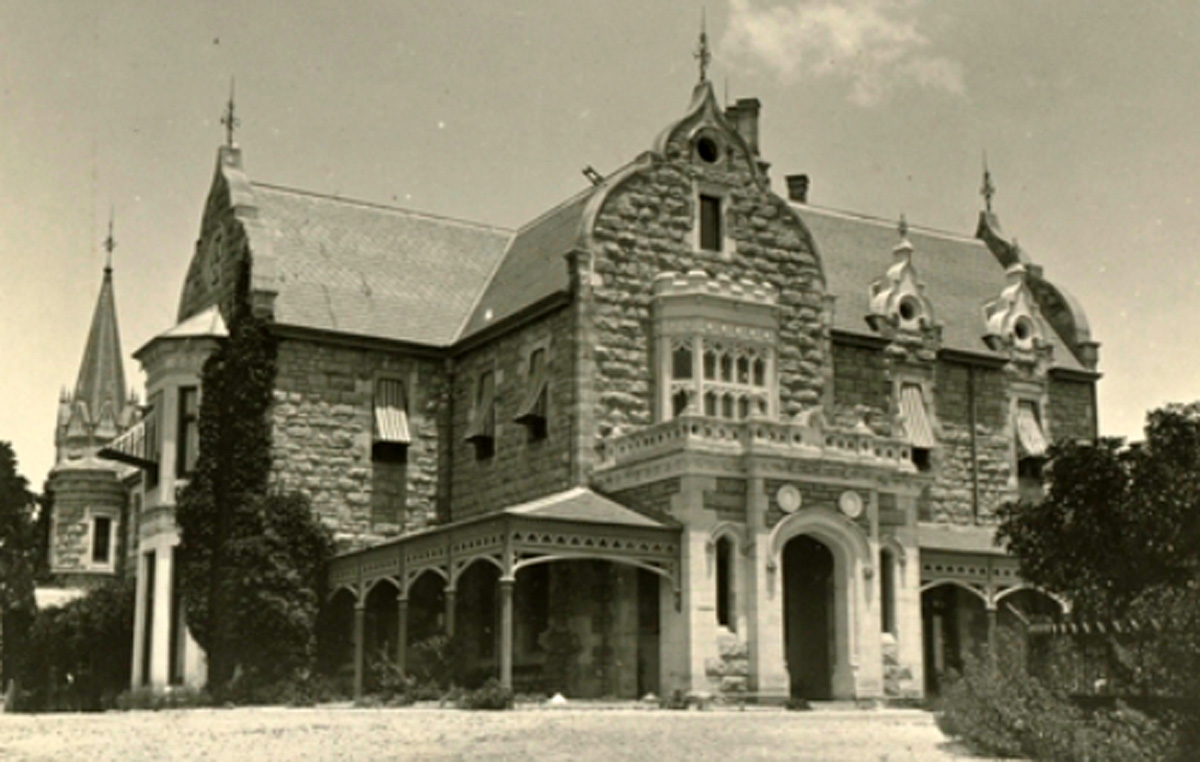
The house, 1901

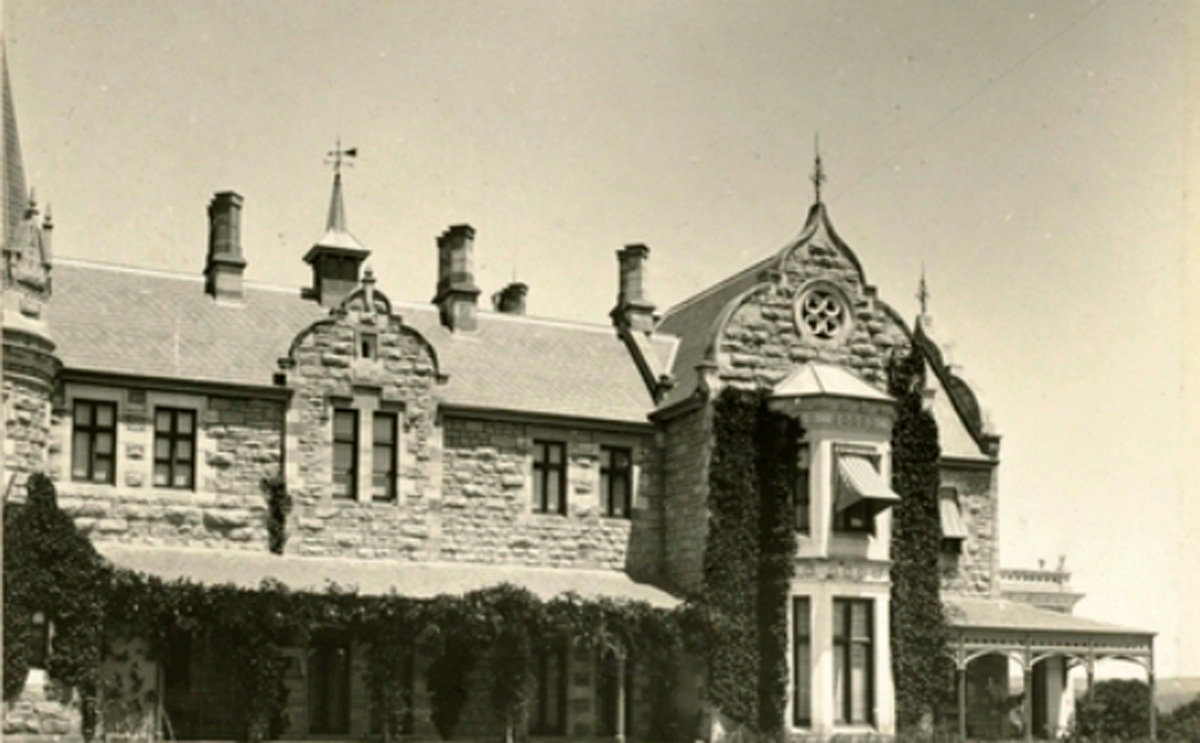
The house, 1901

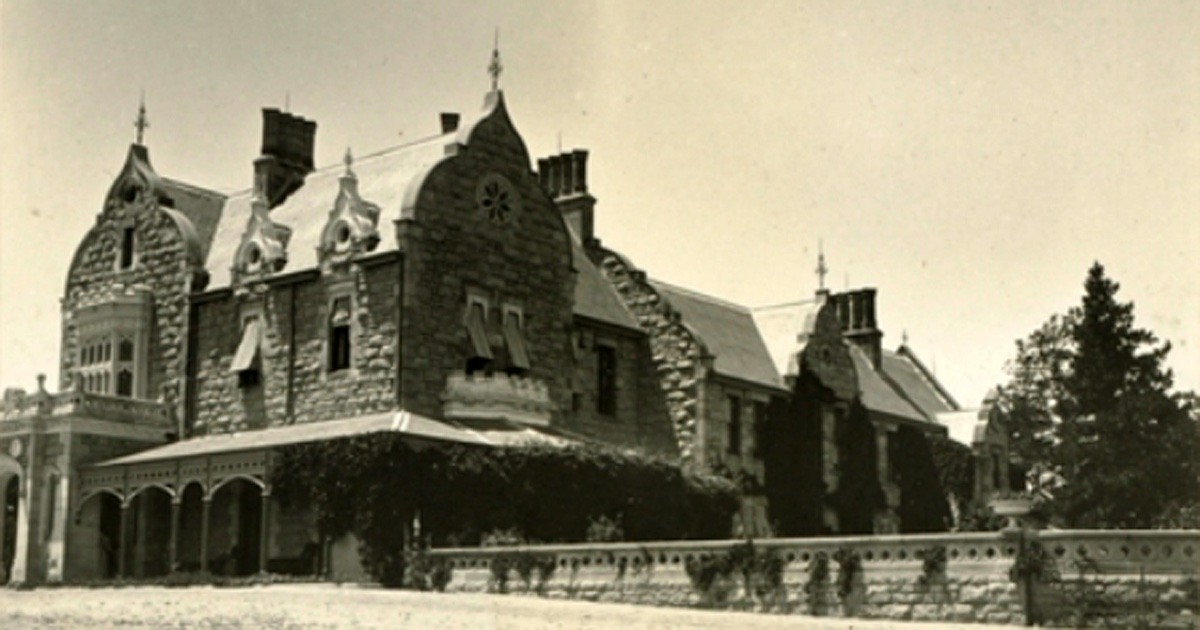
The house, 1901
