= 1813 crossing of the Blue Mountains =

Australian mountaineering expedition

1813 crossing of the Blue Mountains, Australia
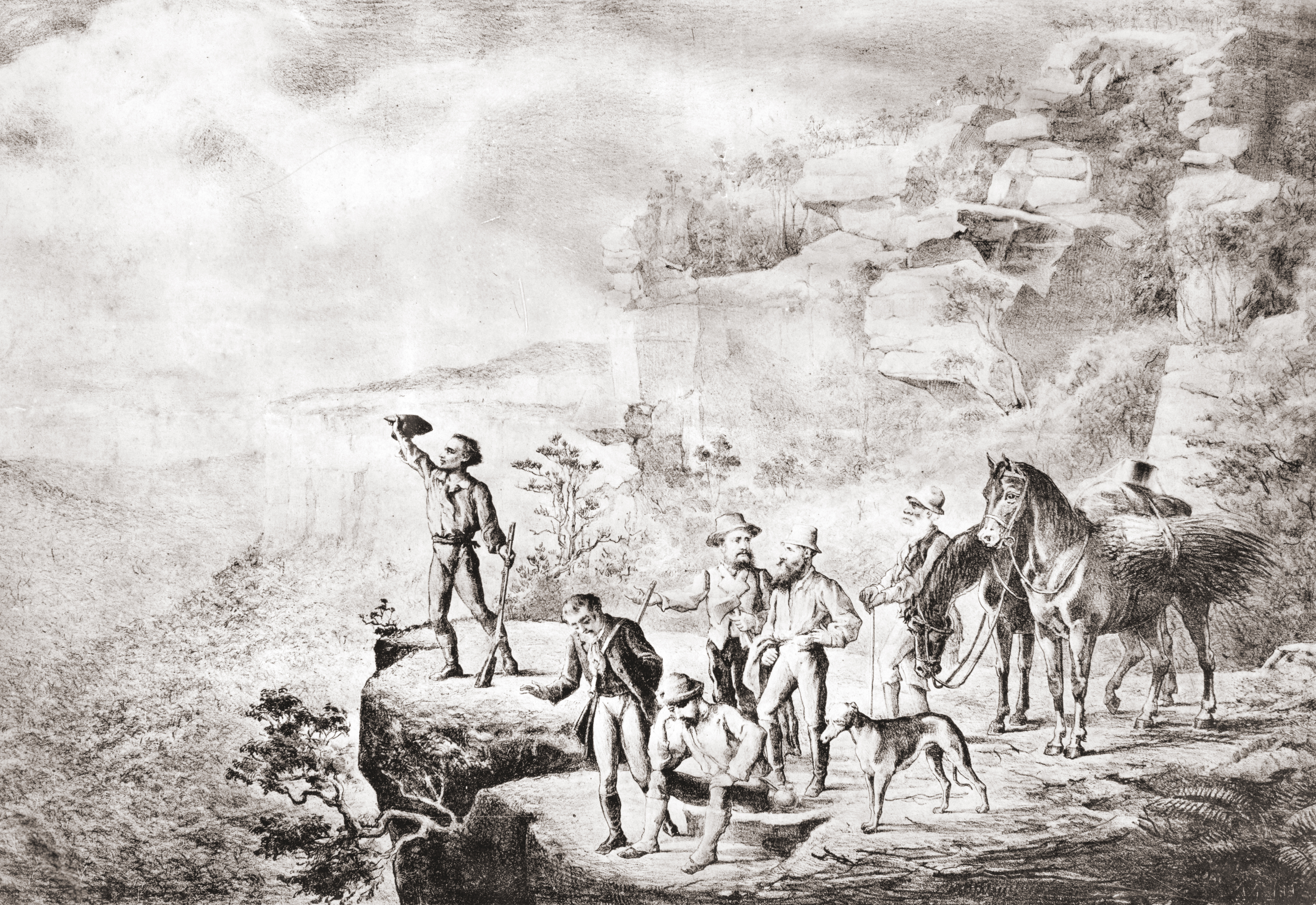
- Earliest pictorial representation of the crossing from The Sydney Mail, 25 December 1880
- Date: 11 May 1813 – 6 June 1813
- Duration: 27 days
- Location: Blaxland's Farm – Blue Mountains – Mt Blaxland
- Organised by: Gregory Blaxland
- Participants: Gregory Blaxland; William Lawson; William Charles Wentworth
- Awards: Land Grants

An expedition led by Gregory Blaxland, William Lawson and William Charles Wentworth in 1813 was the first recorded crossing of the Blue Mountains in New South Wales. The crossing enabled the settlers to access and use the land west of the mountains for farming, and made possible the establishment of Australia's first inland colonial settlement at Bathurst.

== Background ==
The European settlement at Sydney Cove, established in 1788 after the arrival of the First Fleet, grew rapidly. By the early 19th century, the Blue Mountains had become a barrier to the expansion of the colony, which required more farming land to meet its needs, particularly after the droughts of 1812 and 1813. The local indigenous people knew at least two routes by which to cross the mountains. The first was along Bilpin Ridge, later followed by Archibald Bell with the assistance of the local Darug people (now the location of Bells Line of Road), and the second was along Coxs River. Until 1813 however, the settlers remained unaware of how to cross the mountains despite several attempts, including two by Blaxland himself. Early in 1813 Blaxland, who wanted more grazing land, obtained the approval of Governor Lachlan Macquarie and approached Lawson and Wentworth to secure their participation in a new exploratory expedition following the mountain ridges.

=== Gregory Blaxland ===
Gregory Blaxland was born on 17 June 1778 in Kent, England. He sailed for Australia on 1 September 1805 with his wife, three children, two servants, an overseer, a few sheep, seed, tools, groceries, and clothing. When he reached Sydney he sold many of these items and made a profit which enabled him to buy eighty head of cattle so that he could breed cattle and sell the meat. He located 1,600 hectares of land that the government had promised to new settlers as well as forty convict servants and established his farm. He was also one of the first people to plant grapes in Australia and make wine, for which he was awarded a silver medal and later a gold one from the Royal Society of Arts, London.

The town of Blaxland is named after him.

=== William Lawson ===
William Lawson was born in England, where he later trained to become a surveyor. He migrated to Sydney, Australia, arriving in 1800. He was an officer in the New South Wales Corps and owned land where he raised many cattle and sheep. He was invited to join the 1813 expedition with Gregory Blaxland.

The town of Lawson is named after him.

=== William Charles Wentworth ===
William Charles Wentworth was born in Australia to Irish parents. In 1802 he was sent to school in England and returned to Sydney in 1810, where he worked for the governor, Lachlan Macquarie, and was given a land grant of 708.2 hectares (1,750 acres) on the Nepean River.

The town of Wentworth Falls is named after him.

== Expedition ==
On the presumed date of May 11, 1813, Mr. Gregory Blaxland, Mr. William Wentworth, and Lieutenant Lawson, attended by four servants, with five dogs, and four horses laden with provisions, ammunition, and other necessities, left Mr. Blaxland's farm at South Creek, for the purpose of endeavouring to effect a passage over the Blue Mountains, between the Western River, and the River Grose.

— Gregory Blaxland

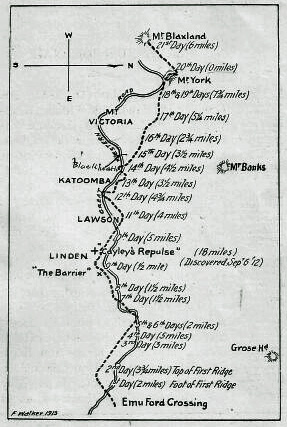
A sketch of their route, prepared by Frank Walker in 1913. The Great Western Road has been inserted to show how closely it has followed the track of the explorers in its general direction.

Blaxland, Wentworth and Lawson led an expedition party, which included four servants, four pack horses and five dogs. Two of the four men who assisted the party have been identified as James Burne (or Burnes), a guide and kangaroo hunter, and Samuel Fairs, a convict who arrived in Australia in 1810. The two others, also thought to be convicts, remain unidentified.

The party left from Blaxland's South Creek farm near the modern suburb of St Marys in western Sydney, on 11 May 1813 and crossed the Nepean River later that day. They made their way over the mountains, following the ridges, and completed the crossing in 21 days. The explorers' success has been attributed to their methodical approach and decision to travel on the ridges instead of through the valleys. The three explorers and two of their servants would set out each day, leaving the other two men at their campsite, and mark out a trail, before turning back later in the day to cut a path for the horses and allow the rest of the party to progress.

The group first saw the plains beyond the mountains from Mount York. They continued on to Mount Blaxland 25 km south of the site of Lithgow, on the western side of the mountains. From this point Blaxland declared there was enough forest or grassland "to support the stock of the colony for thirty years", while Lawson called it "the best watered Country of any I have seen in the Colony". The party then turned back, making the return journey in just six days.

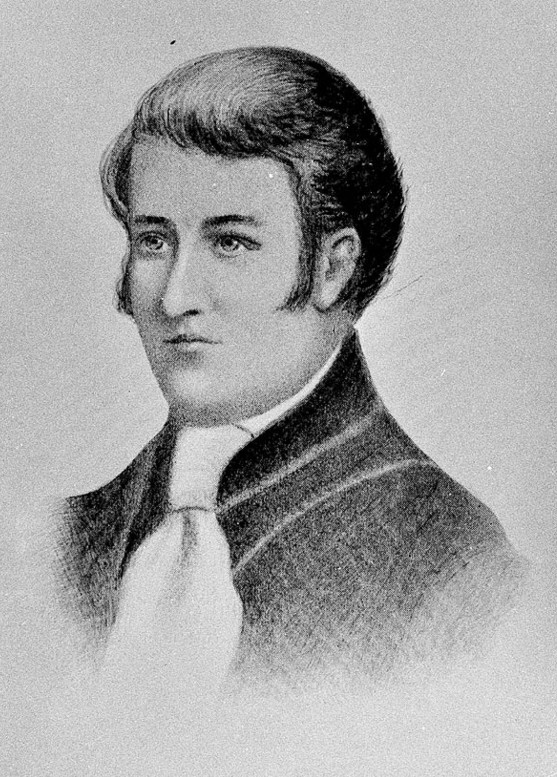
Gregory Blaxland

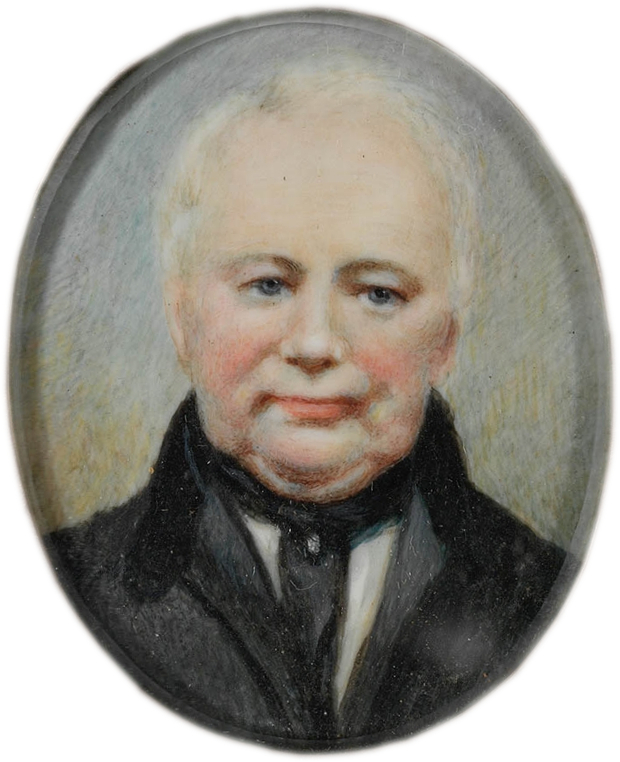
William Lawson

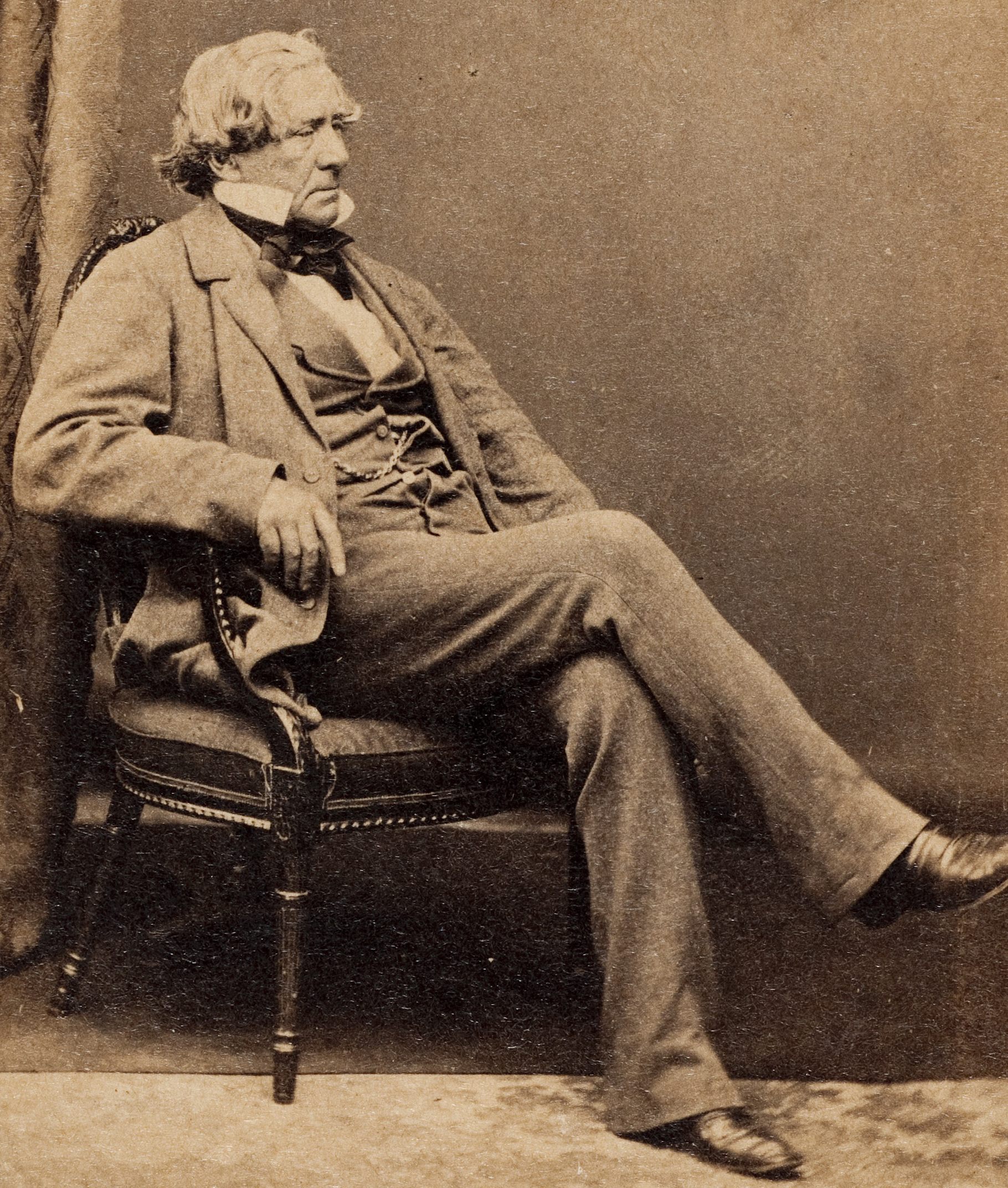
William Charles Wentworth

== Journals of the party ==
All three explorers wrote an account of their expedition. Blaxland was the only one to publish his account, Journal of a Tour of Discovery Across the Blue Mountains, which he did in 1823 during a return visit to England. His journal, written in the third person, records their progress in detail, including their reasons for believing they had achieved their goals and deciding to turn back:

They now conceived that they had sufficiently accomplished the design of their undertaking, having surmounted all the difficulties which had prevented hitherto the interior of the country from being explored, and the colony from being extended. ... Their provisions were nearly expended, their clothes and shoes were in very bad condition, and the whole party were ill with bowel complaints. These considerations determine them, therefore, to return home.

— Gregory Blaxland

Wentworth's journal indicates his inspired impressions of the landscape:

A country of so singular a description could in my opinion only have been produced by some Mighty convulsion in Nature – Those immense unconnected perpendicular Masses of Mountain which are to be seen towards its Eastern Extremity towering above the Country around, seem to indicate that the whole of this tract has been formed out of the Materials of the primitive mountains of which these masses are the only parts that have withstood the violence of the concussion.

— William Wentworth

Lawson, as a trained surveyor, kept detailed notes about the route itself including the distances covered each day, as well as his impressions of the landscape. He recorded on 22 May:

Reached the summit of the Highest land we have yet been, ... and Encamped by a fine stream of water. Here we had a fine view of all our Settlements, our progress was here stoped by an impassable Clift from going either South or West- Mr. Blaxland Wentworth and Self left our Camp with a determination to get down some parts of this broken land. But found it impracticable in some places 500 feet perpendicular here we saw the course of the Western River and that broken Country at Natai the back of the Cow pasters. No doubt this is the Remnant of some dreadful Earthquake

— William Lawson, 22 May 1813
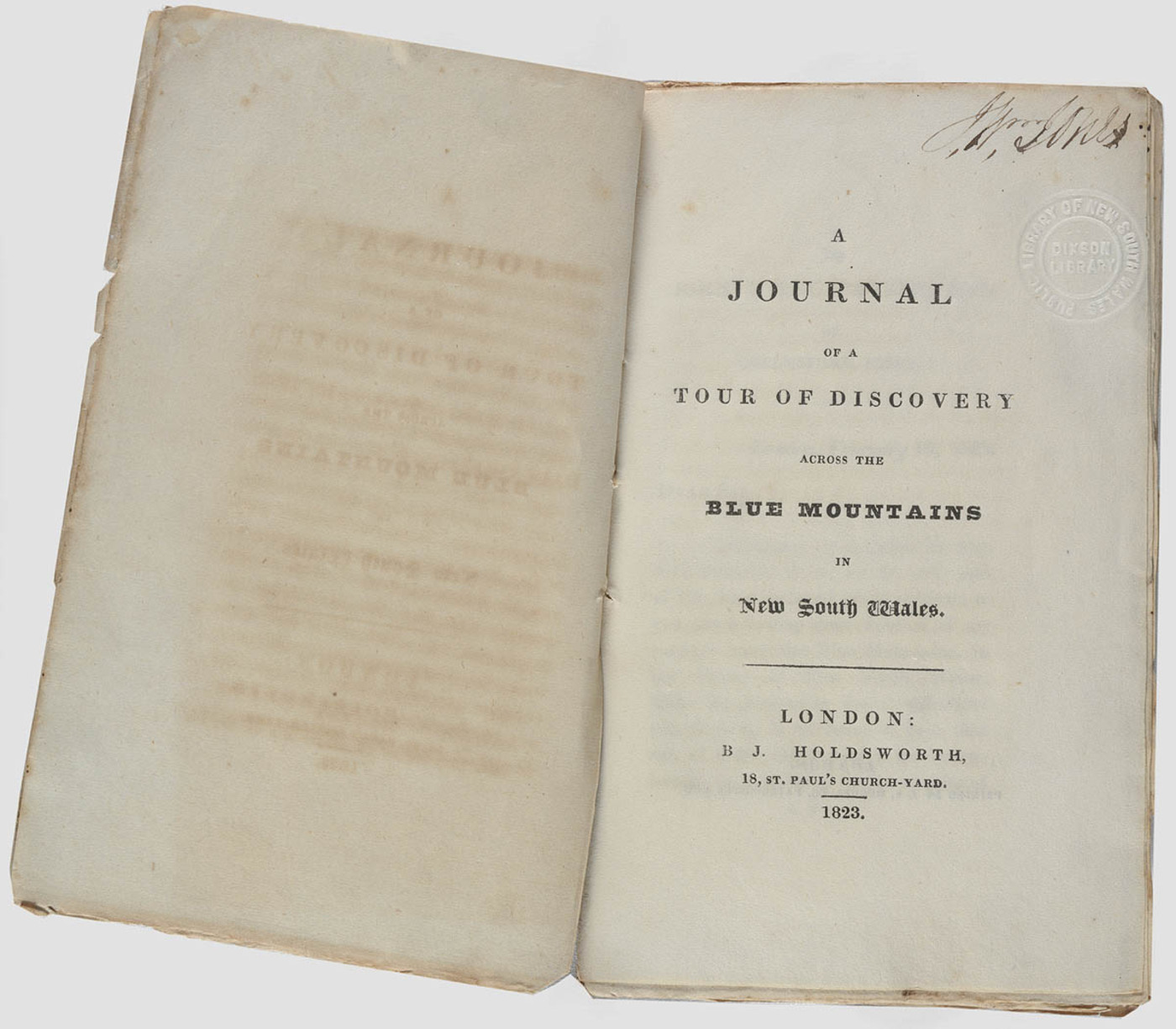
Blaxland's journal

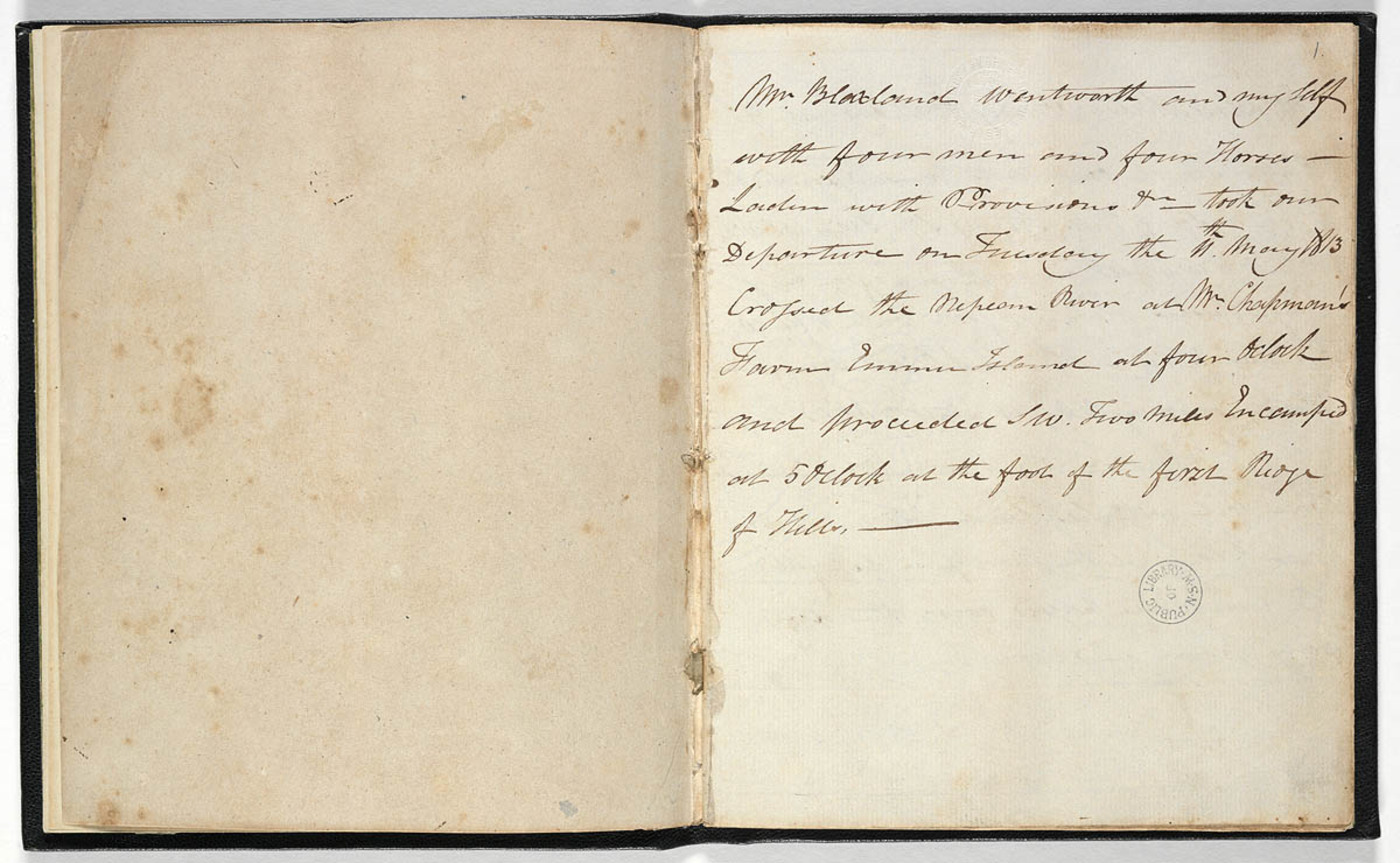
Lawson's journal

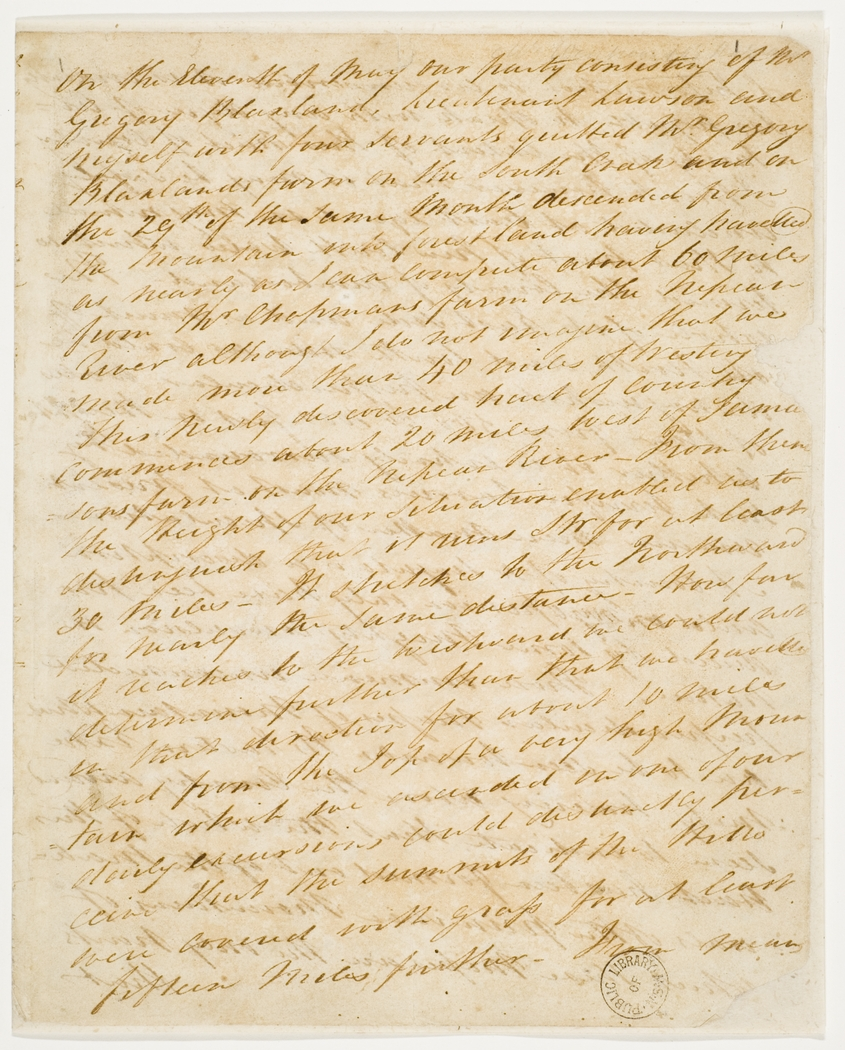
Wentworth's journal

== Aftermath ==
In recognition of the successful crossing, all three explorers were rewarded by Macquarie with a grant of 1000 acres of land west of the mountains. Blaxland later claimed to have led the expedition; however, records from the time of the crossing imply that they were joint leaders.

Surveyor-General George William Evans was dispatched by Macquarie in November 1813 to follow the path taken and travel further to determine the best route to access the arable farmland. Evans continued past Mount Blaxland to the Macquarie and Lachlan Rivers and the site of modern Bathurst. Upon his return, he was rewarded with 1000 acres of land in Tasmania. Macquarie then commissioned William Cox in July 1814 to construct a road, following the path taken by the three explorers and extended by Evans. Cox's team of convict workers completed the job in six months and Cox was rewarded by Macquarie with a grant of 2000 acres of land near the site chosen by Macquarie for Bathurst. Macquarie travelled along the new road, naming it the Great Western Road, in 1815. Artist John Lewin accompanied Macquarie on the tour.

The colonial expansion into the lands of the Wiradjuri people, west of the Blue Mountains, led to the Bathurst war.

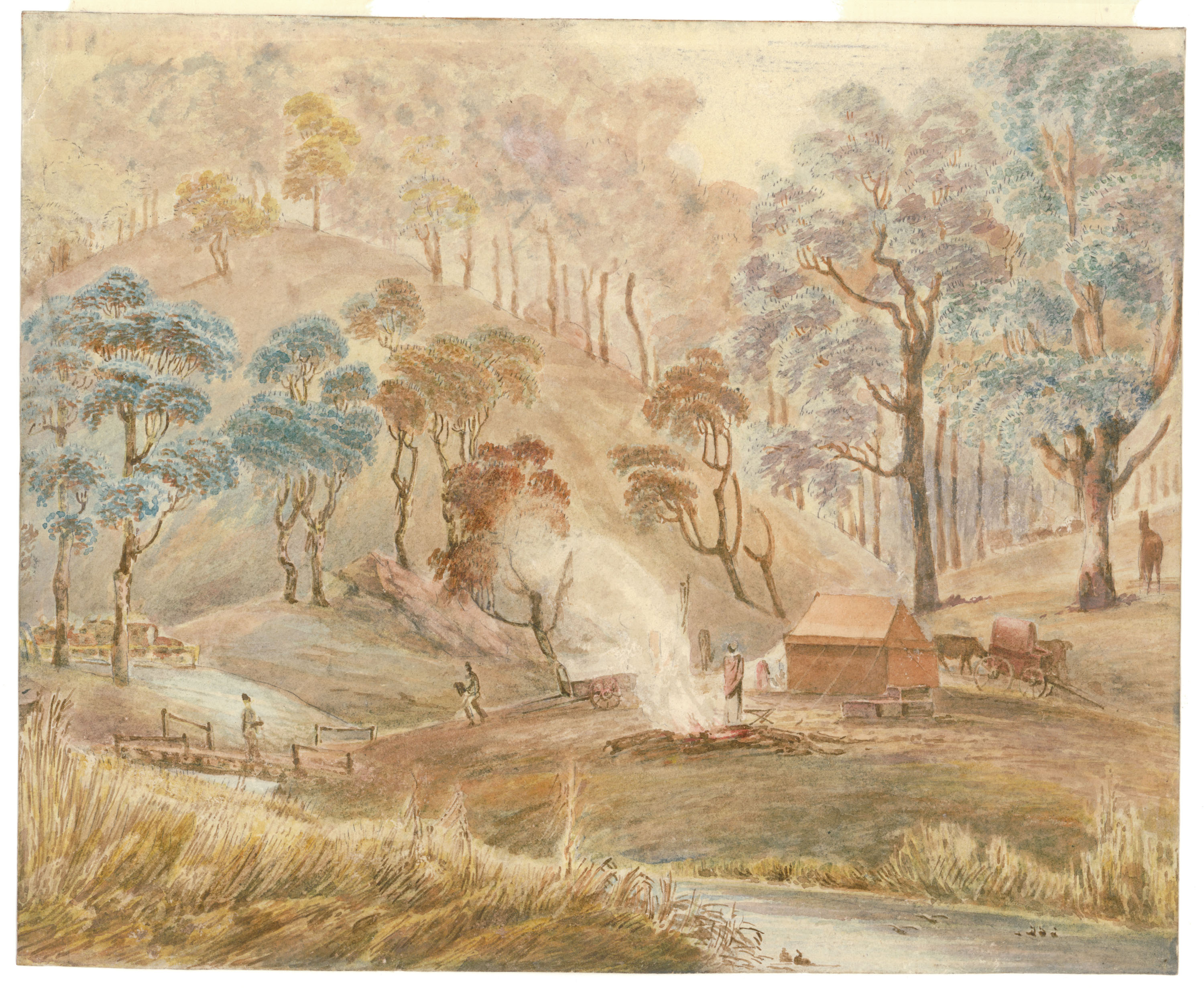
Watercolour painting of Campbells River, by John Lewin (1815)

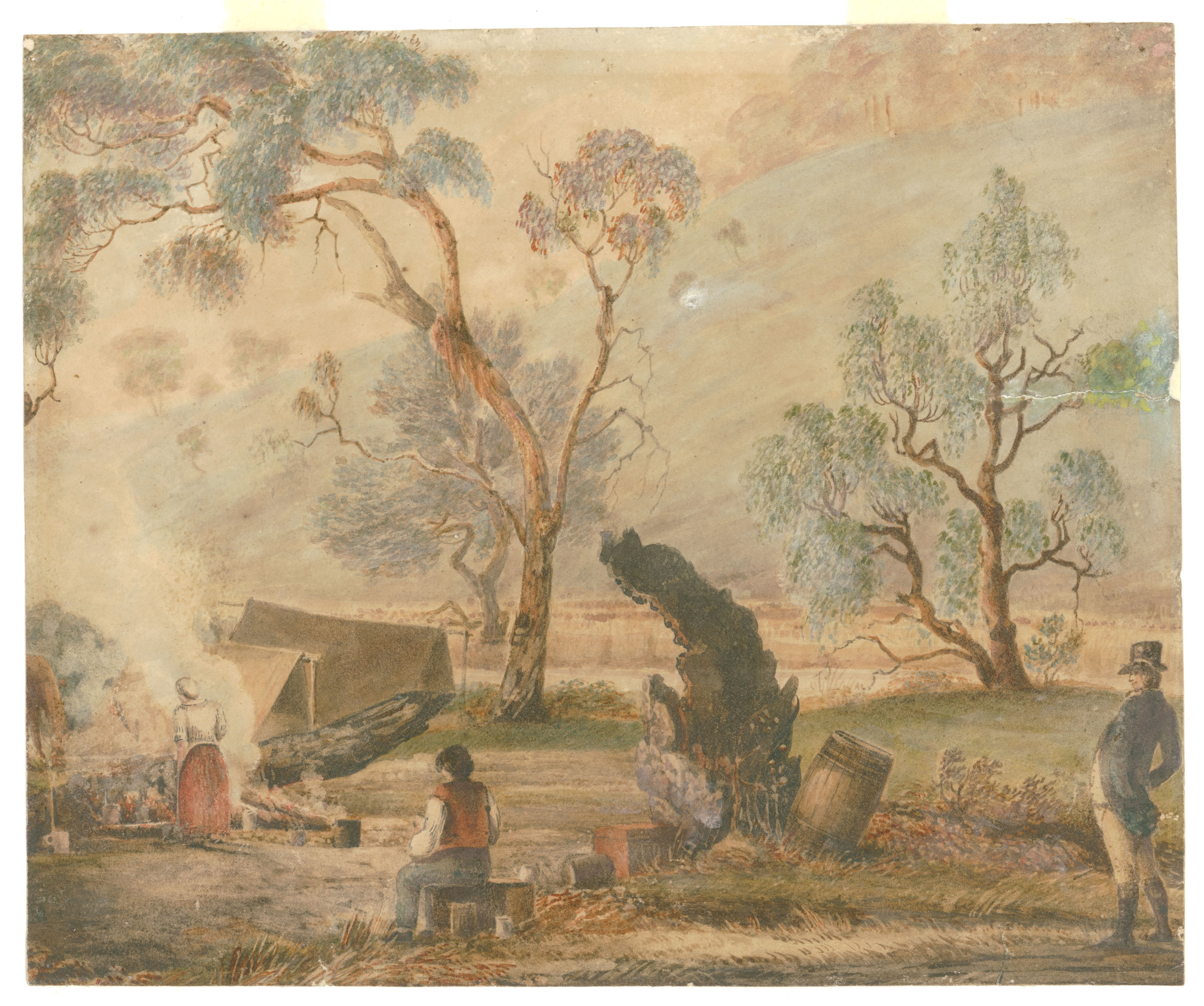
Watercolour painting of Cox's Pass, by John Lewin (1815)

== Commemorations ==
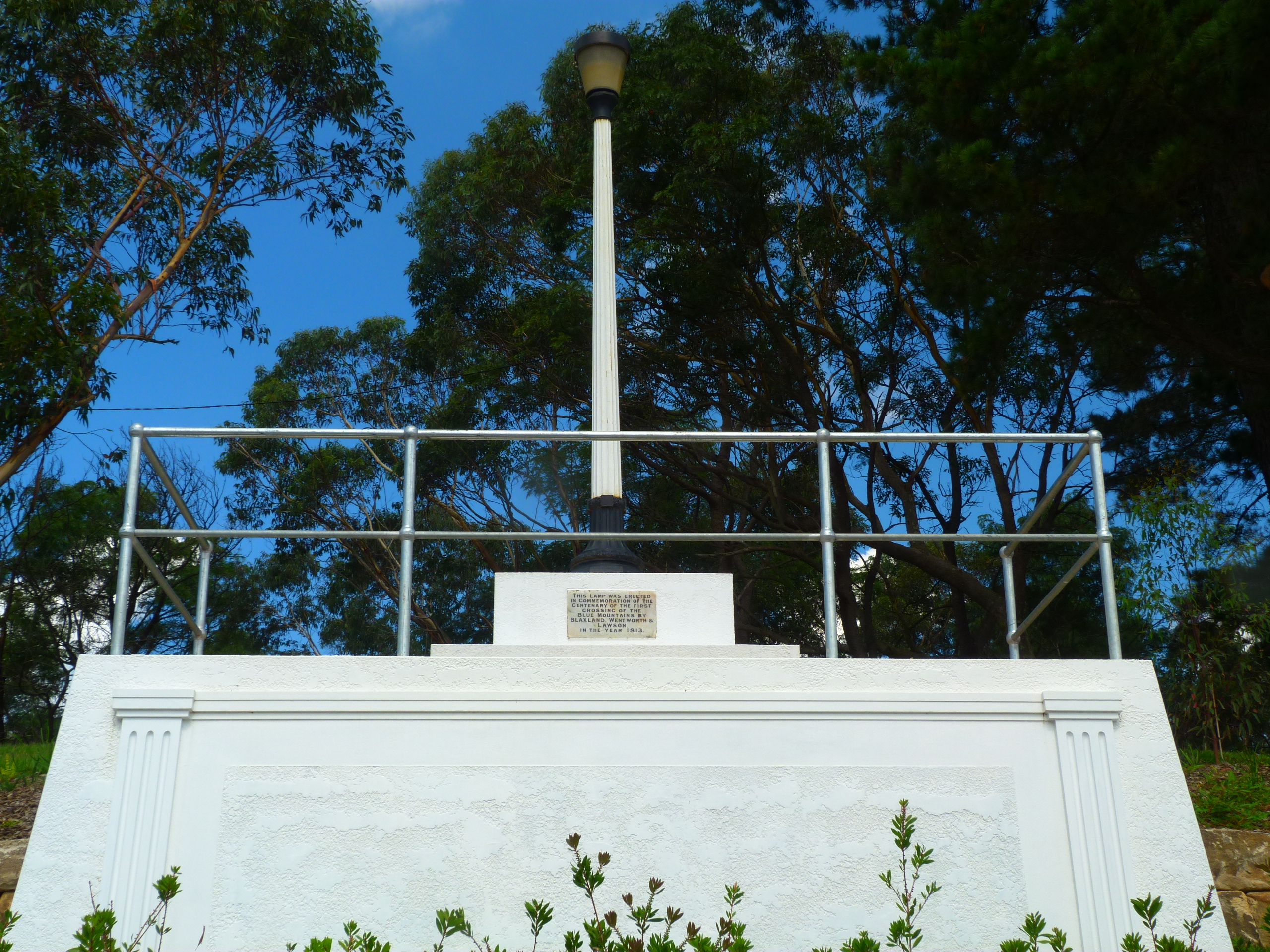
Memorial at Lawson, New South Wales

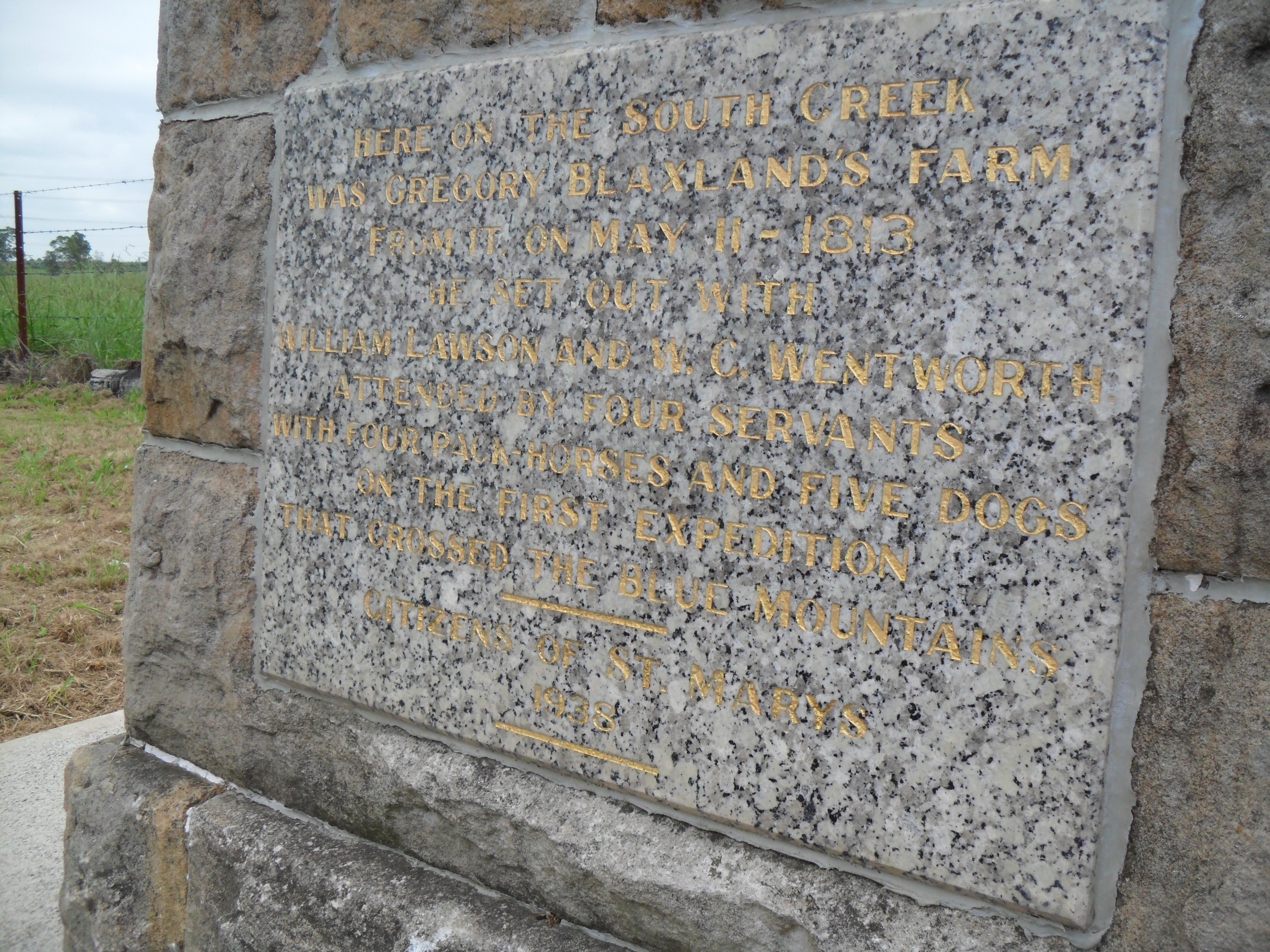
Blaxland, Wentworth and Lawson memorial, Luddenham Road

The crossing and the three explorers have been commemorated in a number of ways, including:

- Several memorials to the explorers have been erected along the route they followed.
- Events to mark the centenary included a luncheon at Mount Victoria.
- Frank Walker, then President of the Royal Australian Historical Society, published a compilation of articles about the crossing and photographs of the Blue Mountains in time for the centenary
- Three towns in the Blue Mountains are named after the explorers: Blaxland, Lawson, and Wentworth Falls.
- Federal electorates were named after two of the explorers: Division of Blaxland and Division of Wentworth.
- A monument to surveyor George Evans in Bathurst dedicated in 1920 also pays homage to Blaxland, Lawson and Wentworth.
- For the 150th anniversary, a 1963 postage stamp featured an image of the expedition.
- Events to mark the bicentenary in 2013 included the Blue Mountains Blue Wave walking party following the route taken by the expedition, a flypast involving 70 aircraft, a silver coin issued by the Royal Australian Mint, and performances of a play written by a descendant of Blaxland.
- A bust of Wentworth was unveiled in Coronation Park, Wentworth Falls in 2016.

It has been claimed that Blaxland, Wentworth and Lawson may have carved their initials into the tree now referred to as the Explorers tree, located about 5 kilometres west of Katoomba. This claim is not universally supported and the tree is not specifically mentioned in the journals kept by the explorers, although they did mark trees to record their route.

== Locations ==
- South Creek Farm – 33.805847°S 150.765587°E
- Caley's Repulse 33.71795°S 150.49513°E
- Mount York – 33.5533°S 150.21966°E
- Mount Blaxland – 33.54750°S 150.10556°E
- Wentworth's Sugarloaf – 33.54250°S 150.10833°E
- Lawson's Sugarloaf – 33.54083°S 150.11000°E

== See also ==
- European exploration of Australia
- History of New South Wales
- Prehistory of Australia
- Bathurst war
