= Pittwater House School =

The Pittwater House School

Location
- 70 South Creek Road, Collaroy, Northern Beaches, Sydney, New South Wales; Australia; 33°44′26″S 151°17′30″E

Information
- Other names: Pittwater House
- Type: Independent co-educational early learning, primary and secondary day school
- Motto: Latin: Semper diligens (Always hardworking)
- Denomination: Non-denominational
- Established: 1961; 65 years ago (as Pittwater House – boys only)
- Founder: Rex Henry Morgan AM, MBE
- Educational authority: NESA
- Chairperson: Todd Alexis SC
- Principal: Dr Steven Middleton DEd (Melb), MEd (Melb), MBus(SportMgt), BA (Melb), GDipEd (Melb), GDip(SportMgt)
- Years: Early learning and K–12
- Enrolment: 950 (2020)
- Area: 3.5 hectares (8.6 acres)
- Houses: Butterworth, Morgan and Orrock
- Colors: White, red, and blue
- Website: www.pittwaterhouse.com.au

The Pittwater House School, commonly called Pittwater House, is an independent non-denominational co-educational Pre-Kindy, primary and secondary day school, located in Collaroy, on the Northern Beaches of Sydney, New South Wales, Australia. The school is relatively unique in providing single-sex education to both boys and girls in both primary and secondary school settings, on the one co-educational campus.

== Overview ==
It was founded in 1961 as a preparatory school for boys. A girls' college followed, opening in 1975. The school's founder, Rex Henry Morgan, was appointed a Member of the Order of the British Empire (MBE) in 1969 and was made a Member of the Order of Australia (AM) in 2002 for his contribution to education.

Pittwater House offers a comprehensive education for students from Pre-Kindy, through Kindergarten to Year 12, and is run coherently in three divisions:

- The Junior School: Pre-Kindy, Junior Girls' College and Boys' Preparatory School
- The Girls' College: Year 7–12
- The Boys' Grammar School: Year 7–12

There are three houses in Pittwater House which students are organised into; Butterworth, Morgan, and Orrock.

The school maintains an Australian Army Cadet Unit (TPHSACU), under the NSW 2nd Brigade, alongside other schools in New South Wales. Enrolment into the program is optional.

== History ==
Being founded in late 1961 and opening in the Thomas Vickers Church Hall in Curl Curl in February of 1962, the school's enrolment numbers grew rapidly, with land being purchased in Collaroy by 1964 to house a new Prep School building. In 1968, the first secondary Grammar school students started, and Mr Morgan gave ownership of the school to a non-profit company which owns and administers the school to this day. The school was registered and accredited by the NSW Board of Studies to offer the HSC and registered with the Commonwealth Government to receive per capita non-government school grants.

The Country Life Scheme was created in 1970, entailing annual visits by class groups to the historic Abercrombie House in Bathurst. This program led to the foundation of the School's Cadet Unit in 1972; the first co-ed Cadet Unit in Australia following the opening of the secondary Girls College in 1975.

The Junior Girls College opened in 1977, at which point sectional headmasters were appointed as administrators of the four schools that made up Pittwater House. In 1984, the 1000-seat capacity Great Hall was completed. Construction of the School's Short Course Olympic Swimming Pool began in 1994, and in 2005 the School opened a purpose built, DOCs compliant, Early Childhood Centre to assist with the demand for pre-school places on the Northern Beaches. In 2009, the school received Australian Government Stimulus Funding grants including a $1.7 million grant for the construction of the indoor sports stadium, which was built in 2010.

== Notable alumni ==
- Roger Noble, army officer and diplomat

== Notable staff ==
- Craig Sandercock

== See also ==
- List of non-government schools in New South Wales
- Rex Henry Morgan
