= Mount Blaxland (New South Wales) =

Historic hill in New South Wales, Australia

Highest point
- Elevation: 901 m (2,956 ft)
- Coordinates: 33.54750°S 150.10556°E

Naming
- Etymology: Gregory Blaxland

Geography
- Location: Central Tablelands
- Country: Australia
- State: New South Wales

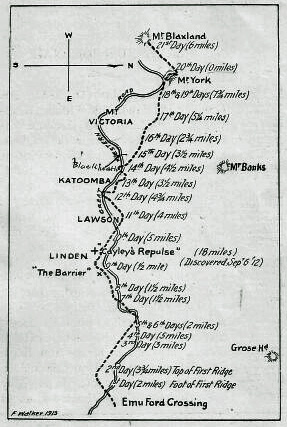
A sketch of Blaxland, Lawson and Wentworth's route across the Blue Mountains in 1813 prepared by F Walker in 1913. The Great Western Road has been inserted to show how closely it has followed the track of the explorers in its general direction.

Mount Blaxland, actually a hill, is located about 15 kilometres south of Lithgow, in New South Wales, Australia. It was the furthest point reached by Blaxland, Lawson, and Wentworth on their historic 1813 crossing of the Blue Mountains.

The name was bestowed upon it by Surveyor-General George Evans when, later in 1813, Evans arrived at the terminal point of Blaxland's expedition. Two other smaller conical shaped hills on the opposite side of a nearby stream were named, by Evans, Wentworth's Sugar-Loaf and Lawson's Sugar-Loaf.

Mount Blaxland is located in the Mount Blaxland Reserve, and is surrounded by private property on 3 sides, and the Coxs River on the North. The guidebook Exploring The Blue Mountains recommends that the best way of accessing Mount Blaxland is to follow Coxs River upstream from Mckanes Bridge (where Mckanes Falls Road crosses the Coxs River)
