= James Morisset =

Commandant of Norfolk Island (1780–1852)

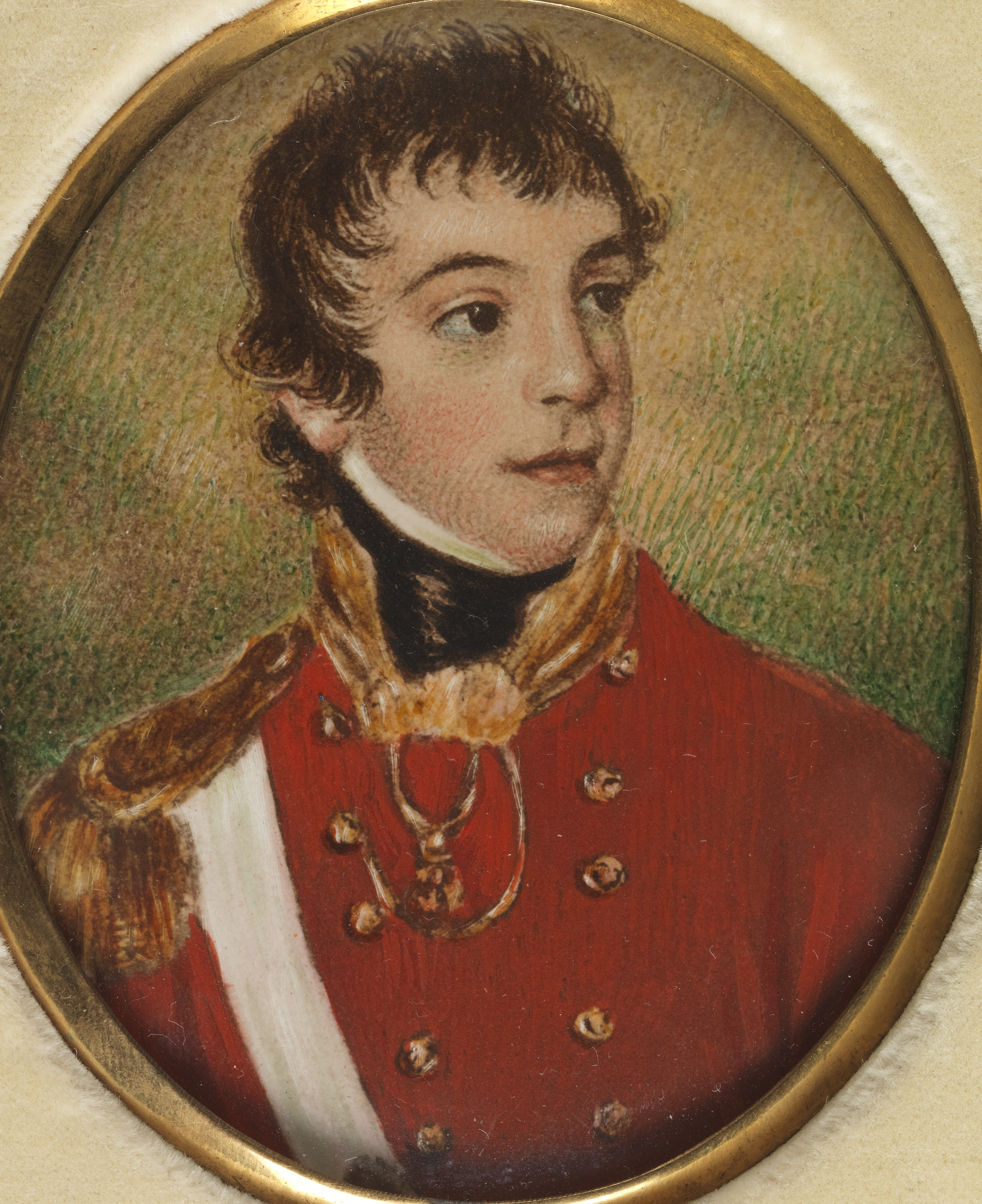
James Thomas Morisset

Lieutenant Colonel James Thomas Morisset (1780 – 17 August 1852), penal administrator, was commandant of the second convict settlement at Norfolk Island, from 29 June 1829 to 1834.

== Early life ==
Morisset was baptised on 21 August 1780 in the Church of St Giles in the Fields, Holborn, London, the son of James Morisset (1738–1815) and Jannetta Tadwell. His father, James Morisset, was a famous goldsmith of Huguenot descent. The name of James Morisset is inextricably associated with the finest examples of Applied Art in enamels and precious metals and stones to have been produced in England in the last quarter of the eighteenth century. James Morisset crafted presentation swords and snuff boxes, and many of his works remain today held by the Queen of the United Kingdom, in museums or in private collections.

== Military career ==
In 1798 Morisset was commissioned into the 80th Regiment of Foot in 1798. He fought in Egypt against the French invasion of Egypt and Syria, receiving a gold medal for his service from the Sultan of Egypt in 1801. He was promoted Lieutenant in the same year.

In 1805, he bought a captaincy in the 48th Foot. He was wounded in 1811 in the Peninsular War, leaving his face badly disfigured.

In 1817 he arrived in New South Wales with his regiment. He was promoted Major in 1819.

== Colonial administration ==
In December 1818 he was appointed as commandant and magistrate at Newcastle. His public works were admired by Governor Macquarie. His attention to prisoners, and attempt to adapt punishments to individual convicts was also praised by Commissioner Bigge. He was regarded as a stern disciplinarian, with historian B.W. Champion reporting that "the cat-o'-nine-tails and the triangle … were in daily and almost hourly service".

Champion wrote that "Morisset was also an advocate of that gruelling mental and physical punishment, the treadmill—a system of punishment which eventually made the convict a burden on the community, instead of an active helper, by reason of the breakdown in mental and physical wellbeing which always accompanied long turns at the wheel." However, Vivienne Parsons responded in the Australian Dictionary of Biography that the wheel "was a normal form of punishment at the time and Morisset does not appear to have been considered unnecessarily harsh by his contemporaries." Champion noted that we have only hearsay evidence for his reputed harshness.

Morisset was the first settler to make an overland journey from Newcastle to Sydney. He completed this journey in nine days in April and May 1823. As a result of this expedition, the Surveyor-General Major Mitchell was ordered to survey a route, which he completed in 1829.

In November 1823 Morisset was appointed commandant at Bathurst, where he led the military response against the Wiradjuri nation in the Bathurst War of 1824. This included a massacre of 45 largely unarmed Wiradjuri men, women and children at Turon River in September 1824. The missionary Lancelot Threlkeld reported that "forty-five heads were collected and boiled down for the sake of the skulls," and "packed for exportation in a case at Bathurst ready for shipment to accompany the commanding Officer on his voyage shortly afterwards taken to England". The commanding officer is alleged to have been Morisset, however Morisset's descendants dispute this identification.

== Norfolk Island ==
Morisset returned to England on leave in February 1825 where, at the age of 43, he married Emily Louisa Vaux. While in England, Morisset reported on convict control in New South Wales and applied for the post of commandant of Norfolk Island, which was about to be re-established as a penal settlement for the most hardened convicts. He was recommended for this position by Bathurst, the Secretary of State for War and the Colonies, and promoted lieutenant colonel, but Governor Ralph Darling appointed him instead as superintendent of police. The Governor was apparently reluctant to appoint Morisset to Norfolk Island because of the high salary he had been promised and because he insisted on taking his family. Morisset bitterly resented this, but in 1829 got his way and was appointed commandant of Norfolk Island. At the time the convict population was about 200 but rose to over 550 by 1831, and 700 the next year.

During his tenure there the convicts made several attempts at mutiny, and he gained the reputation as a strict disciplinarian. Governor Darling regretted that "nothing but Severity has been attempted, to effect [the convicts] reformation'. Morisset recommended importing a treadmill, but the British government objected on the grounds of expense.

Darling was sympathetic to Morisset, calling him "a very Zealous Officer" whose duties were of "a most arduous nature". He observed that "the Conduct of the Prisoners has of late been outrageous in the extreme, having repeatedly avowed … to Murder every one employed at the Settlement, and it is only by the utmost vigilance that they have been prevented accomplishing their object." The convicts, he noted "are Men of the most desperate Character". Morisset requested to be moved, but the government replied that he "should be reminded that it was at his own solicitations that he was appointed".

The editor of a Sydney newspaper, E. S. Hall, wrote in 1832 that the convicts on Norfolk Island had been "made the prey of hunger and nakedness at the caprice of monsters in human form … and cut to pieces by the scourge … [and] have no redress or the least enquiry made into their suffering".

An abortive mutiny in January 1834, which led to nine deaths and many wounded, resulted in a trial of the ringleaders being held on Norfolk Island instead of in Sydney.

During his time at Norfolk Island, Morisset was dogged by ill-health, perhaps a result of his old head wound, and in 1834, because of a violent nervous disorder, was given a year's leave in Sydney, Foster Fyans being appointed to act in his place. When this leave expired Morisset resigned his post.

== Death and legacy ==
Morisset retired to farming near Bathurst, where he was appointed police magistrate. He lost heavily in a bank crash and was forced to sell his property to pay his debts. Although in ill-health he continued as magistrate until his death on 17 August 1852. His wife Emily and ten children were left without any means of support; Emily appealed to the government for a pension in September.

Three of Morisset's sons continued his tradition of military service by becoming officers in the paramilitary Australian native police force which operated against Aboriginal groups resisting European colonisation. One of these sons, Edric Norfolk Vaux Morisset was Commandant of this force in the early 1860s.

The township of Morisset, New South Wales is named after James Thomas Morisset. Morisset's legacy continues to be debated.
