= Blaxland Creek =

Blaxland
- Etymology: In honour of Gregory Blaxland

Location
- Country: Australia
- Region: Sydney basin (IBRA), Greater Western Sydney
- Local government area: Penrith

Physical characteristics
- Source
  - location: near Mulgoa
  - coordinates: 33°49′57″S 150°42′03″E
- Mouth: confluence with South Creek
  - location: Orchard Hills
  - coordinates: 33°47′32″S 150°45′31″E
- Length: 10 km (6.2 mi)

Basin features
- River system: Hawkesbury-Nepean catchment

Blaxland Creek, a watercourse that is part of the Hawkesbury–Nepean catchment, is located in Greater Western Sydney, Australia.

== Course and features ==
Blaxland Creek rises in the western suburbs of Sydney, about 4 kilometres (2.5 mi) east south-east of Mulgoa and flows generally north by east, and then north-east by east before reaching its confluence with South Creek, in the suburb of Orchard Hills. The creek has a course of approximately 10 kilometres (6.2 mi).

Blaxland Creek, on Department of Defence land near Penrith, is probably the last near-pristine freshwater stream in the Cumberland Plain. Blaxland Creek, because it has been relatively untouched by development, can be used not only as a touchstone for understanding the biodiversity of other freshwater streams on the Cumberland Plain but as a way of reintroducing native species to other streams.

The creek in named in honour of Gregory Blaxland, a pioneer farmer and explorer who was granted land in the Orchard Hills area from 1810.

== See also ==
- Rivers of New South Wales
