= William Stewart (governor) =

Scottish-born Australian administrator, politician and soldier

Major-general William Stewart

Lieutenant-Governor of New South Wales
- In office 1825–1827

Governor of New South Wales (Acting)
- In office 13 days in 1925 (Note: Sources vary from 13 to 18 days.)
- Preceded by: Thomas Brisbane
- Succeeded by: Ralph Darling

Member of the Legislative Council of New South Wales
- In office 1825–1827
- Preceded by: new title

Personal details
- Born: 1 January 1769 Caithness, Scotland
- Died: 8 April 1854 (aged 85) Bathurst, New South Wales, Australia
- Spouse: Sylvia Anne (née Wolfe)
- Children: 4
- Occupation: Government administrator; politician; soldier; pastoralist
- Military career
- Allegiance: United Kingdom
- Branch: British Army
- Service years: 1794–1831
- Rank: Major-general
- Units: 101st Regiment (1794–1796); 3rd Regiment (1796–1832)
- Commands: 3rd Regiment
- Active duty: West Indies, Spain, Portugal, Canada, France

William Stewart (1769 – 8 April 1854) was a Scottish-born Australian administrator, politician, soldier, and pastoralist.

Stewart was born in Caithness, Scotland to William Stewart of Caithness, and he was the grandson of Donald Stewart of Appin. In 1794 he enlisted in the army, serving in the West Indies, Spain, Portugal, Canada and France.

Commissioned as a colonel, Stewart and his regiment were sent to the penal Colony of New South Wales; Stewart was the most senior military officer and he took up the post of Lieutenant-Governor in 1825, and served until 1827. Upon his appointment, he also served as an inaugural Member of the Legislative Council of New South Wales and, for approximately two weeks, was acting Governor of the Colony. During his tenure, Stewart was involved in establishing a mounted police unit.

Stewart served with his regiment in India, where he was commissioned as a major-general.

== Personal life ==
Stewart married Sylvia Anne (née Wolfe), and was survived by three daughters and one son, James Horne Stewart. Granted 1,300 hectares (3,200 acres) near Bathurst, New South Wales in 1827, after service in India he returned to the Bathurst area in 1832 to retire, where he died in 1854, aged 85 years.

== See also ==
- Abercrombie House
- List of British Army regiments that served in Australia between 1810 and 1870
