= Rex Henry Morgan =

Australian academic

Rex Henry Morgan AM, MBE, was the founder of The Pittwater House School, located on the northern beaches of Sydney, New South Wales, Australia. For his services to education Morgan was appointed a Member of the Order of the British Empire (MBE) in 1969 and was appointed as a Member of the Order of Australia (AM) in 2002.

Morgan was appointed (1978–1983) as NSW Committee Member of the Duke of Edinburgh's International Award – Australia; and from 2001 to 2009 served as Deputy Chair of The Friends of The Duke of Edinburgh Award in Australia and during 2010–2011 as its Chair/President.

== Honours ==
- Silver Distinguished Service Medal, The Duke of Edinburgh's International Award - Australia (2017)
