= Gregory Blaxland =

18/19th-century English-Australian farmer and explorer

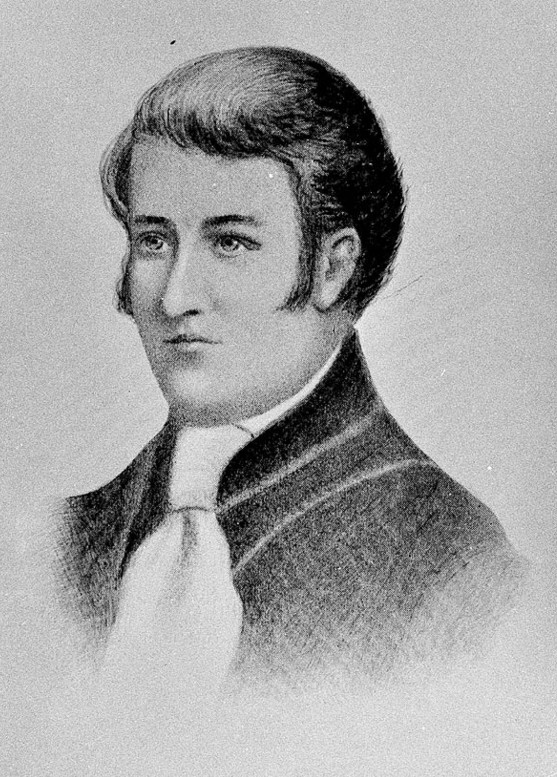
- Portrait, 1813
- Born: 17 June 1778; Kent, England
- Died: 1 January 1853 (aged 74); New South Wales, Australia
- Burial place: All Saints Parramatta
- Known for: 1813 crossing of the Blue Mountains
- Spouse: Elizabeth Spurdon ( - 1826)
- Children: 7 - John Blaxland
- Parents: John Blaxland (father); Mary Parker (mother)

Gregory Blaxland (17 June 1778 – 1 January 1853) was an English pioneer farmer and explorer.

== Blue Mountains expedition ==
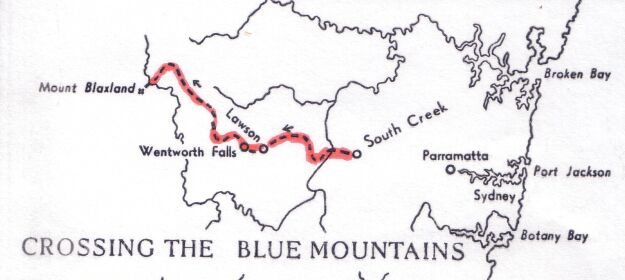
Exploration of Blaxland, Lawson and Wentworth

Early in 1813 Blaxland, who needed more grazing land, obtained the approval of Governor Lachlan Macquarie for an attempt to cross the Great Dividing Range, known as the Blue Mountains, following the mountain ridges, instead of following the rivers and valleys. He secured the participation of William Lawson and William Charles Wentworth in the expedition, which was successful (though the expedition stopped short of actually crossing over the mountains) and enabled the settlers to access and use the land west of the mountains for farming. The crossing took 21 days, and only 6 days to return.

In recognition of the successful crossing, all three explorers were granted by Macquarie 1,000 acres (400 ha) of land west of the mountains.

== Later years ==
His wife died in December 1826. In January 1827 Blaxland was elected by a public meeting with two others to present a petition to Governor Darling asking that "Trial by jury" and "Taxation by Representation" should be extended to the colony.

His son John was a prominent businessman. He was appointed to the New South Wales Legislative Council and served there from 1863 until his death in 1884.

== Publications ==
- A Journal of a Tour of Discovery Across the Blue Mountains, 1823
- Wine from New South Wales, 1828

== Recognition ==
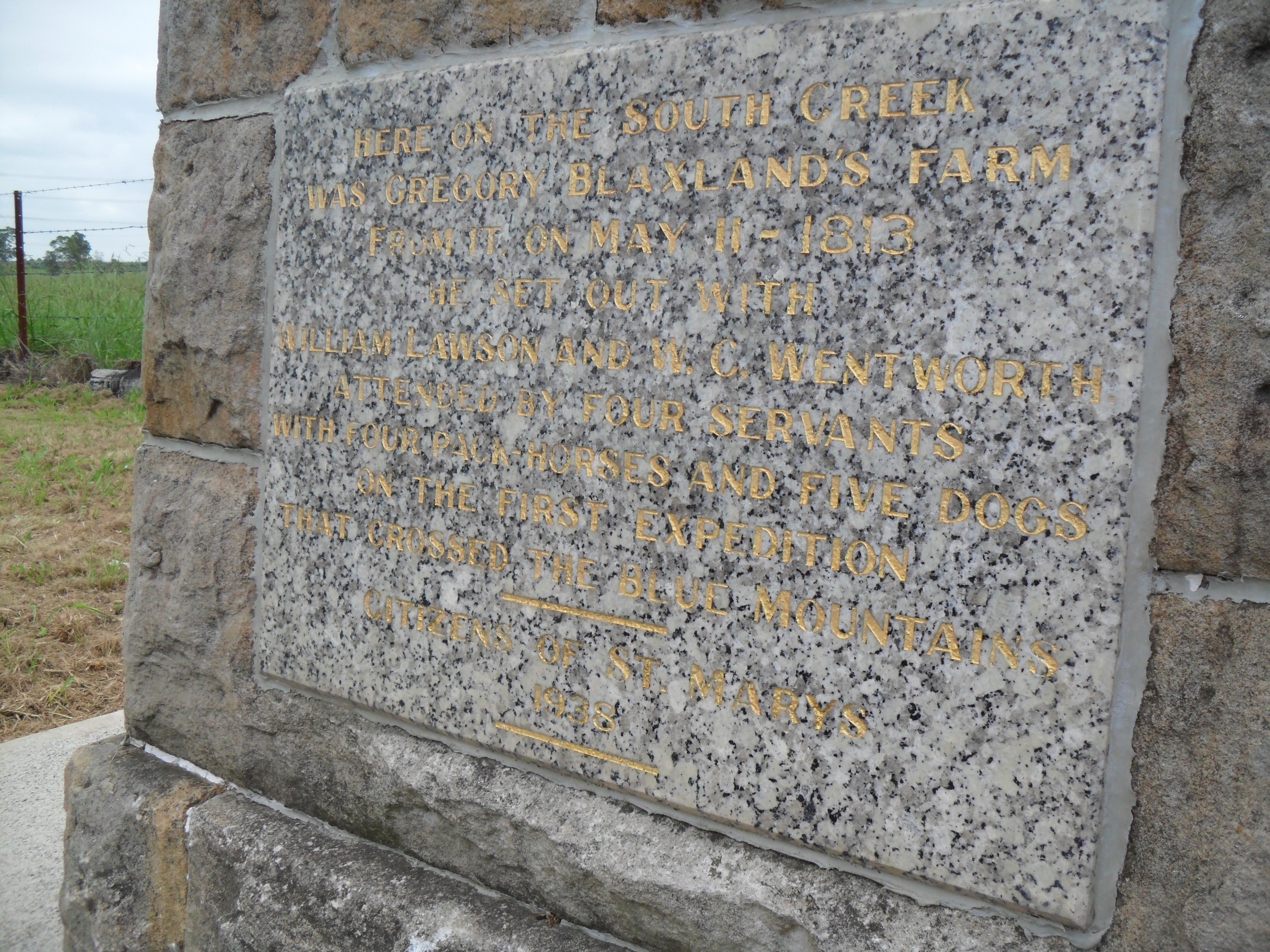
Blaxland, Wentworth and Lawson memorial, Luddenham Road

- The township of Blaxland in the Blue Mountains is named after him, as is the Australian Electoral Division of Blaxland.
- Blaxland Creek runs near his land grant in western Sydney.
- Gregory, Blaxland, Lawson and Wentworth Avenues are found in the Melbourne suburb of Frankston where the Blaxland Avenue Reserve runs through.
- Blaxland Road
  - Eastwood
  - Wentworth Falls

In 1963 he was honoured, together with Lawson and Wentworth, on a postage stamp issued by Australia Post depicting the Blue Mountains crossing.

== See also ==
- Land exploration of Australia
- List of Blue Mountains articles
