= Collits' Inn =

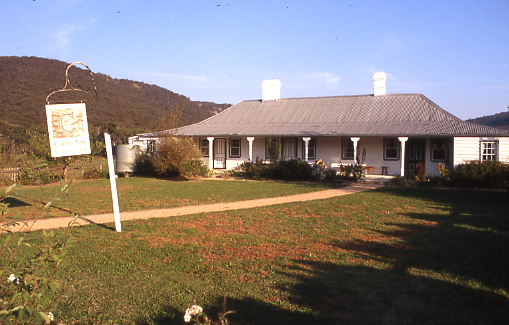
- Collits' Inn, pictured in 1989

- Location within New South Wales Location within Australia
- 33°32′14″S 150°13′25″E
- Location: Hartley Vale Road, Hartley Vale, City of Lithgow, New South Wales, Australia

History
- Built: 1823

Site notes
- Architect: Pierce Collits
- Architectural style: Old Colonial Georgian

New South Wales Heritage Register
- Official name: Collits' Inn; Collitts Inn; Golden Fleece Inn
- Type: State heritage (complex / group)
- Designated: 2 April 1999
- Reference no.: 455
- Type: Inn/Tavern
- Category: Commercial

Collits' Inn is a heritage-listed former inn and now functions, accommodation and restaurant at Hartley Vale Road, Hartley Vale in the Central West region of New South Wales, Australia. It was designed by Pierce Collits and built in 1823. It is also known as Collitts Inn and Golden Fleece Inn. It was added to the New South Wales State Heritage Register on 2 April 1999.

== History ==
Pierce Collits was transported to New South Wales in 1801. His wife, Mary, accompanied him on the Minorca as a free woman, and in 1803 she received a grant of 28 hectares (69 acres) on the Castlereagh flood-plain. Macquarie pardoned Pierce in 1810, he became a substantial grazier and held various government positions. After obtaining an additional 20 hectares (49 acres) at Prospect, the Collits family was allowed to settle over the Blue Mountains in 1821 with 145 head of cattle, but Pierce remained as Chief constable on the Nepean until 1823. In 1823 both Lawson's Long Alley down from Mount York, by-passing Coxs Road of 1812, and Bells Line of Road descending midway along Darling Causeway were created. Collits built an inn near the convergence of these roads in the same year, 1823: the inn is shown on Surveyor Hoddle's 1823 map of Bells Line.

Until Mitchell opened Victoria Pass in 1832, Collits Inn, the Golden Fleece, was the premier hostelry on the old western road. It was also a leading place for stock mustering and stock sales, so Collits had substantial holding paddocks on the 80 hectares (200 acres) portion 27 (where the Inn was sited) and on the adjacent 60 hectares (150 acres) of portion 29 to the south (where the cemetery was established). By 1828 Collits was running 360 cattle and 300 sheep of his own.

After a decade of success, with visits from Governors in 1829 and 1832 and the post office franchise in 1830, the Golden Fleece declined after 1834 and Collits opened new inns first in Little Hartley, then in Hartley. The Hartley Vale property then became primarily a farm retained by Pierce Collits until his death in 1848. It passed from the Collits family in the 1860s when the pioneer family of Sodwalls, the Whalans, bought it and retained it as a private house until at least the 1880s. In 1911 Job Commens, son of John Stephen Commens of Duddawarra in Kanimbla and his wife Grace born a Dalziell of Rosevale also in Kanimbla, bought the farm and renamed it Mount York Farm. Job and Grace, with their son Alan, farmed there until 1920, when the farm was leased for three years because of Grace Commens' fourth pregnancy late in life. The Commens sold Mount York when the lease expired in 1923. In 1946 a Croatian immigrant, Steve Pilarcik, bought the property, joined by his wife in 1965. In 1986 a Permanent Conservation Order (no. 455) under the NSW Heritage Act was placed on the property with a defined curtilage. In 1998 Mrs Pilarcik sold the property to Mr and Mrs Stewart, whose family already held adjacent property. In 2007 Collits Inn was sold by the Stewarts to the MacDonald family as a private residence, when in 2014 it was then leased out as a wedding venue to the Warrens. In April 2025 the property was again sold by the Macdonald family to the new owners Darren and Lee-Ann Byrnes the current Collits Inn owners, it is still currently being leased out as a wedding and events venue.

Historical Period:

- Built 1800 - 1825
- Used 1800 - 1825
- Used 1826 - 1850
- Used 1851 - 1875
- Used 1876 - 1900
- Used 1901 - 1925
- Used 1926 - 1950
- Used 1951 - 1975
- Used Post 1975.

== Description ==
Collits' Inn is a single story Old Colonial Georgian building, of weatherboard and brick nog construction. The Collits Inn group consists of the Inn, the Stables, the Barn, the Outbuilding, the Woolshed, the Pit toilet and the External Septic Toilet lying on 12 hectares (30 acres) of Portion 27 in the County of Cook.

The Inn is an excellent example of a wayside Inn from the Colonial period with many of the characteristics of the old Georgian style, including its pleasant human scale, symmetrical facade, stone flagged verandah below a broken-back hipped roof, small pane sash windows and simple chimneys. The Inn has remnant gardens in its vicinity and is set behind a screen of substantial pine trees on the road.

=== Condition ===
As at 27 November 2001, the initial archaeological assessment report on the Collit's Inn complex had predicted the potential survival of substantial and significant archaeological evidence relevant to all prior occupation phases.

The completion of the work described in this report confirmed the high archaeological potential of the area within and around Collit's Inn. As a sample transect across the site and through the main Inn building the trenches overall confirmed the predicted intactness of the archaeological resources of the site. The nature of the historic occupation of the site and of the documentary evidence, means that additional material or deposits, particularly informally established features such as rubbish dumps, may be expected to be present elsewhere in or around the Inn. For this reason unnecessary disturbance of the deposits around or within the Inn itself must not occur within any other future projects.

The Inn is in a generally intact condition with some alterations and additions to the exterior and interior. Within the site around the Inn there is likely to be evidence of a number of early structure shown on maps in the 1830s.

=== Further information ===
Draft Landscape Conservation Management Principles:

- A key objective is to conserve the landscape setting of Collit's Inn as a simple and unpretentious rural cottage garden, stocked with 19th century plant varieties and surrounded by paddocks, apple orchards and remnant natural areas; Existing trees, shrubs and other plants within the curtilage of the Inn shall be conserved in accordance with their relative significance; New garden plantings should predominantly be of species and varieties known to have been grown in the local area during the mid-19th century (refer to list).

== Heritage listing ==
As at 10 August 2007, Collits' Inn and its group of surviving buildings is of national significance for its rare historical, aesthetic, technical and social values. It was built c. 1823 by Pierce Collits and his family and was initially known as the Golden Fleece. It was the first wayside inn built west of the Blue Mountains and was sited to service people and stock using the first roads descending Mount York. Pierce Collits had held various NSW Government positions in the early 1800s and also became a significant early grazier west of the mountains. The inn was well known at the time and operated until Mitchell's construction of Victoria Pass in 1832. The buildings and much of the surrounding property then remained in direct Collits ownership until 1875 as Mount York Farm. The family were later involved in a number of other local inns in the Hartley area. Collits' Inn has an important range of strong historical associations such as those with early Governors of NSW, early surveyors, possible early military connections, a focal point for all roads crossing the mountains for many years and the first country post office. The adjacent cemetery has direct associations with the first settlement west of the Blue Mountains.

Aesthetically the group of buildings are remarkably well preserved and the Inn, clad in weatherboard, is an excellent example of a wayside inn from the colonial period with many of the characteristics of the Old Colonial Georgian style including its pleasant human scale, symmetrical facade, stone flagged verandah below a broken backed hipped roof, small paned sash windows and simple chimneys. The Inn has remnant gardens and orchards in its vicinity and is set behind a screen of substantial Monterey pines on the road. The setting in a remote site in the Vale of Clywdd below a spur of the Blue Mountains and its visual relationship to Mount York also contributes to this aesthetic significance.

The range of intact early construction materials and evidence of early building techniques are of high technical significance. The brick nog construction of the earliest sections of the inn are extremely rare in NSW. Other important issues which could provide opportunities for further research are the range of early building materials and techniques such as the use of dry pressed bricks, local sandstone, joinery and other timberwork including the rough timber construction for the surviving outbuildings such as the barn. The interiors are relatively simple in form and finish but are relatively intact retaining a high degree of original fabric. The archaeological potential of the site is high.

The Inn has had social importance to a number of different groups over the years. Initially it was intrinsically linked with the lives of all early NSW travellers and settlers west of the mountains providing an important service to the region and a rare social meeting place. During the years while operating as a substantial farm it was important to the Hartley community possibly as a symbol of the first grazing and inn keeping family to settle in the region. While in the years since the turn of the (20th) century and particularly since the unique Australian operetta called "Collits" Inn' was produced in 1934, a broader community attachment has developed by those with a specific academic interest in the inn to those with a romantic image of its early history, but also including those with a general interest in Australian history and the part that Collits' Inn played. The comments in the visitors books since the 1930s testify to this community value. Also the descendants of the Collits family are now substantial in number, live throughout Australia and are a cohesive group who regard the Inn and its unique history as pivotal to the past, present and future lives of their families.

The Collits' Inn complex contains an historical archaeological resource of local, state and national heritage significance. The Inn was one of the earliest historic sites to be established west of the Blue Mountains. It exemplifies the development of the early Western Road and reflects the first phase of the great westward expansion of the colony during the early decades of the 19th century after the first crossing of the Blue Mountains in 1813. The Inn has strong associations with significant historical figures including Governors (Darling, Bourke), inn keepers (Pierce Collits and family), surveyors or road builders and early travellers (Dumaresq). The main Inn and surrounding site has considerable historical archaeological value and research potential to demonstrate the general character of its types of occupation from the early 19th century onwards. In themselves colonial period inns are a significant class of buildings which have been little studied archaeologically. Although a number of city hotels have been archaeologically excavated in recent years that is not the case for roadside inns, especially those in rural and remote locations. There is strong scientific research potential inherent to this site because substantial sections of its archaeological deposits remain intact. Examination of the material culture of the Inn would be possible as would research questions about the types of treatment given to members of different social classes, dependence on supplies from Sydney versus local products, indeed any questions relevant to the organisation and running of such an early Inn.

Collits' Inn was listed on the New South Wales State Heritage Register on 2 April 1999 having satisfied the following criteria.

The place is important in demonstrating the course, or pattern, of cultural or natural history in New South Wales.

Collits Inn and its group of surviving buildings is of National Significance for its rare historical, aesthetic, technical and social values. It was built in c 1823 by Pierce Collits and his family and was initially also known as the Golden Fleece.

It was the first wayside inn built west of the Blue Mountains and was sited to service people and stock using the first roads descending Mount York.

The place has a strong or special association with a person, or group of persons, of importance of cultural or natural history of New South Wales's history.

Collits Inn has an important range of strong historical associations such as those with early Governors of NSW, early surveyors, possible early military connections, a focal point for all roads crossing the mountains for many years and the first country post office. The adjacent cemetery has direct connections with the Collits family and the Inn is historically important in itself for its associations with first settlement west of the Blue Mountains. Its importance declined when Mitchells Road was built, so that its period of greatest significance was short.

The place is important in demonstrating aesthetic characteristics and/or a high degree of creative or technical achievement in New South Wales.

The setting at a remote site in the Vale of Clwydd below a spur of the Blue Mountains and its visual relationship to Mount York also contributes to this aesthetic significance. The group of buildings are remarkably well preserved, and the Inn is an excellent example of a wayside Inn from the Colonial period with many of the characteristics of the old Georgian style. The buildings as a group together with their early gardens, orchards, vegetable gardens and pond constitute a cohesive early farm development. The building group demonstrates a wide range of early and vernacular materials and techniques.

The place has potential to yield information that will contribute to an understanding of the cultural or natural history of New South Wales.

This item has scientific significance and is assessed as rare on a state basis. While in the years since the turn of the century, a broader community attachment has developed by those with a specific academic interest in the Inn to those with a general interest in early Australian history and the part that Collits' Inn played. The comments in the visitors book since the 1930s are of value to all the community.

The place possesses uncommon, rare or endangered aspects of the cultural or natural history of New South Wales.

This item is assessed as rare on a state basis.

The place is important in demonstrating the principal characteristics of a class of cultural or natural places/environments in New South Wales.

This item is assessed as representative on a state basis.

== See also ==
- Collits' Inn (musical)
