= Garnet Malley =

Australian fighter pilot

Garnet Francis Malley
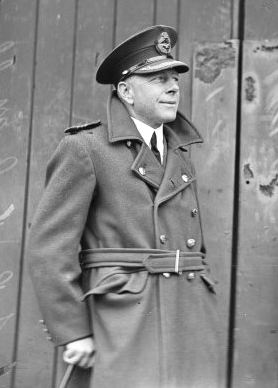
- Squadron Leader Malley, c. 1930
- Born: 2 November 1892; Mosman, New South Wales, Australia
- Died: 20 May 1961 (aged 68); Vanua Balavu, Fiji
- Military career
- Allegiance: Australia
- Branch: Australian Imperial Force; Royal Australian Air Force
- Service years: 1915–19; 1920–30; 1940–43
- Rank: Group Captain
- Nicknames: "Garnie"; "George"
- Units: No. 4 Squadron AFC (1917–18); No. 5 Squadron AFC (1918–19); No. 3 Squadron RAAF (1925–29)
- Conflicts: World War I World War II
- Awards: Military Cross; Air Force Cross; Legion of Merit (US)
- Other work: Aviation adviser

Garnet Francis Malley, MC, AFC (2 November 1892 – 20 May 1961) was an Australian fighter ace of World War I, credited with six aerial victories. He was an aviation adviser to Chiang Kai-shek's government in China during the 1930s, and an intelligence officer in World War II.

Born in Sydney, Malley first saw service in World War I as an artilleryman with the Australian Imperial Force. He transferred to the Australian Flying Corps in 1917, and the following year flew Sopwith Camels with No. 4 Squadron on the Western Front. Malley was awarded the Military Cross for his achievements in combat, and his subsequent work as a flying instructor in England earned him the Air Force Cross.

After a spell in civilian life following the war, Malley joined the Royal Australian Air Force (RAAF) in 1925, serving with No. 3 Squadron. He became an aviation adviser to China in 1931, and worked closely with Soong Mei-ling (Madame Chiang Kai-shek) from 1937. Malley was able to observe air tactics in the Sino-Japanese War at first hand, though his reports were given little weight in Australia. Returning home in 1940, he served in intelligence roles with the RAAF and later the Commonwealth government. After the war he bought a plantation in Fiji, where he died in 1961.

== Early life ==
Garnet Francis Malley, the second youngest of six children of Clara Ellen Merritt and Francis Malley, was born in Mosman, a suburb of Sydney, on 2 November 1892. His father, an ironworker originally from Gosford, founded the whitegoods firm Malley's. He later served two terms as alderman of Mosman Council. Garnet Malley attended the Church of England Preparatory School in Mosman, The School in Mount Victoria, and Hawkesbury Agricultural College in Richmond. At the outbreak of World War I he was an apprentice mechanic at Malley's.

== World War I ==
Malley joined the Australian Imperial Force (AIF) on 12 October 1915. He departed Melbourne for Egypt as a gunner with reinforcements of the 1st Field Artillery Brigade aboard HMAT Wandilla on 9 November. In March 1916, he was posted to the Western Front in France, and joined his unit in May. The 1st Brigade took part in the Battles of Pozières and Mouquet Farm in July and August 1916. Malley transferred to the Australian Flying Corps (AFC) as a mechanic in April 1917, before undertaking flying instruction at the Oxford University air school. He was commissioned a second lieutenant on 9 October and assigned to No. 4 Squadron AFC, then based in Birmingham.

Equipped with Sopwith Camel fighters, No. 4 Squadron deployed to Bruay, France, in December 1917, and commenced operations on 9 January 1918. That same day Malley, nicknamed "Garnie" (or "George", by No. 4 Squadron's leading ace, Harry Cobby), was promoted lieutenant. On 16 March, he achieved his first aerial victory, sending a fighter belonging to Manfred von Richthofen's Red Circus out of control above Annoeullin, near Douai. Early reports identified the German plane as an Albatros, but later sources record it as a Pfalz D.III. Malley claimed two Albatroses on 23 March 1918, during an attack on German positions in Vaulx-Vraucourt, near Bapaume. Three days later he was promoted captain and appointed a flight commander.

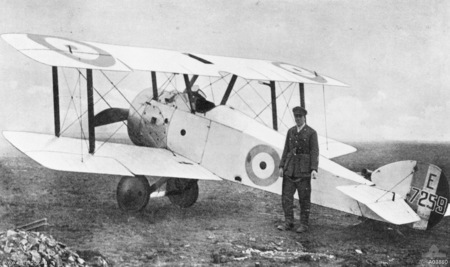
Captain Malley with his white Sopwith Camel of No. 5 (Training) Squadron, Minchinhampton, 1918

The official history of Australia in the war credits Malley with the destruction of a Pfalz over Wytschaete on 10 May, though it does not appear in other accounts of his final tally. Four days later, he and Lieutenant Roy King each claimed a German two-seater spotting for artillery between Ypres and Bailleul. On 30 May, Malley and Cobby led their flights on a bombing mission in the Lys region, after which they each destroyed a German observation balloon over Estaires. Malley's final victory, over the Lys on 1 June, was a Pfalz D.III. His official tally was six German aircraft destroyed—four fighters, an observation balloon, and an unidentified observation plane—and he was wounded in action twice, by a bullet through the leg in March, and by shrapnel from anti-aircraft fire in May. He was awarded the Military Cross on 22 June. The citation was promulgated in The London Gazette:

Lt. (T./Capt.) Garnet Francis Malley, Aust. F.C., attd. R.F.C. For conspicuous gallantry and devotion to duty. When on offensive and low-flying patrol he attacked one of two hostile scouts, which eventually turned over and fell out of control, being seen to crash by another pilot. Later, a general engagement ensued with four enemy scouts, one of which he attacked, with the result that it fell completely out of control and crashed. Prior to this occasion he had also shot down out of control another hostile machine. His courage and able leadership have resulted in his patrol carrying out excellent work under the most adverse conditions.

Malley took temporary command of No. 4 Squadron at the end of June 1918, overseeing its move from Clairmarais North to a new airfield at Reclinghem. In August, he was posted to No. 5 (Training) Squadron AFC at Minchinhampton, England. The squadron was part of the 1st Training Wing, led by Lieutenant Colonel Oswald Watt. Malley's rotation to home establishment was in accordance with Royal Air Force policy requiring pilots to be rested and serve as instructors after nine to twelve months in combat. Known for flying a white Camel trainer, he received the Air Force Cross for his instructional work; the award was promulgated on 3 June 1919.

== Inter-war years ==
No. 5 Squadron was disbanded in May 1919. Along with many other Australian Flying Corps personnel, including Colonel Watt, Major King, and Captain Les Holden, Malley returned to Australia aboard the troopship Kaisar-i-Hind, disembarking in Sydney on 19 June. He subsequently toured the country to promote the Peace Loan. On 24 August, while travelling from Melbourne to Sydney to commence his series of demonstration flights around New South Wales, Malley crashed his Avro 504K during takeoff from Benalla, Victoria. He was uninjured but had to return to Melbourne and eventually made his way north by train. Resuming his aerial program, he was reported on 17 September as having "thrilled" lunch-time crowds in Sydney the previous day with "three daring spiral dives" over Hyde Park. Malley was discharged from the AIF on 4 October 1919, and commissioned a captain in the Commonwealth Military Forces Reserve on 1 July 1920. He rejoined Malley's as a warehouse manager in 1921. In May that year, he served with Les Holden and other veteran pilots as a pall-bearer at Watt's funeral in Randwick. On 25 January 1922, Malley married Phyllis Kathleen Dare in Mosman. The union would produce one son, Maldon. Malley was acknowledged as both a source and a reviewer by F. M. Cutlack in the latter's volume on the Australian Flying Corps, first published in 1923 as part of the official history of Australia in the war.

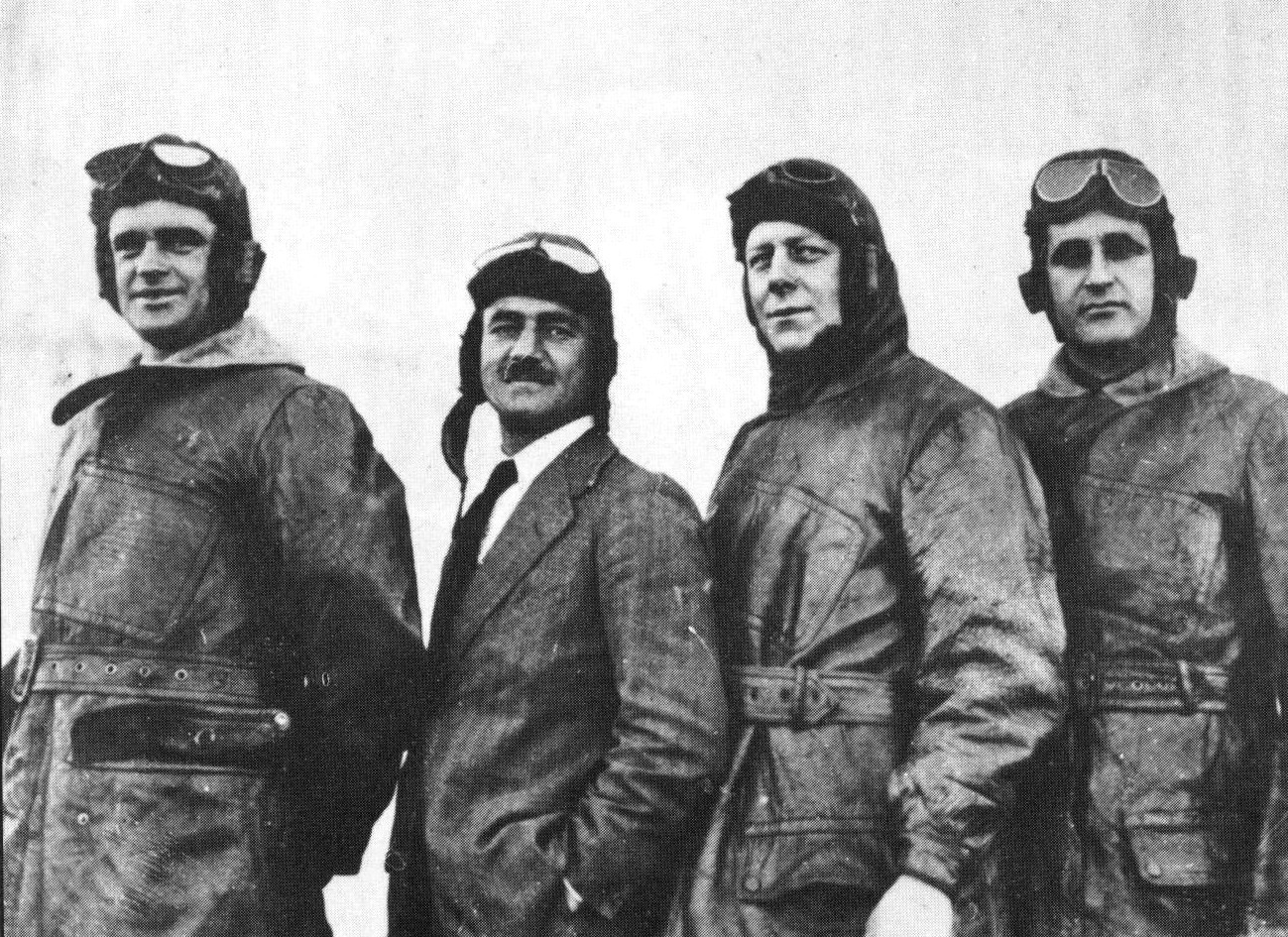
Flight Lieutenant Malley (second right) with Flight Lieutenant Frank Lukis (far left) and other members of No. 3 Squadron, RAAF Richmond, 1925

Malley relinquished his appointment in the Commonwealth Military Forces on 18 June 1925. The following day, he was commissioned a flight lieutenant in the Citizen Air Force, the part-time active reserve of the Royal Australian Air Force (RAAF). He served as a pilot with No. 3 Squadron, which operated Airco DH.9s and Royal Aircraft Factory S.E.5s. Formed at RAAF Point Cook, Victoria, the squadron transferred to the newly opened RAAF Richmond, New South Wales, on 30 June. From 1925 to 1928, Malley was vice president of the Australian Flying Corps Association. In January 1928, he was promoted to honorary squadron leader, and temporarily commanded No. 3 Squadron in March–April. That year, he gave up his position with Malley's to become an aviation consultant to Australian National Airways (ANA), as well as a director of the company. In January–February 1929, he again temporarily commanded No. 3 Squadron. That April, he was a member of the citizens' committee responsible for organising and funding the search for the Southern Cross and its crew, Charles Kingsford Smith and Charles Ulm, who had force-landed in North West Australia during a flight from Richmond to England. Les Holden eventually located the missing airmen near the Kimberley region. In 1930, Malley transferred to the (inactive) RAAF Reserve.

By 1931, ANA was in financial difficulties and Malley travelled to China to take up a position as an aviation adviser to Chiang Kai-shek's government in Kwangtung. Details of Malley's exact duties over the next five years—a time of civil war and Japanese infiltration—remain uncertain. He spent some time in Australia on holiday in 1936, after which he returned to his advisory role in China. On 1 February 1937, through the influence of the British Foreign Office, Malley's status was enhanced when he was made an honorary wing commander in the RAAF Reserve. He was by now serving as adviser to Madame Chiang Kai-shek, Soong Mei-ling, in her capacity as secretary-general of the aeronautical commission that directed China's air force; May-Ling extended to Malley her "warmest congratulations" for his "well deserved" promotion. One of the tasks she assigned him was investigating corrupt procurement practices in the government. Malley found that the air ministry was being defrauded by foreign agents and Chinese officials colluding to charge inflated prices for military equipment.

Malley's stay increasingly involved him in the fighting in China; his wife would relate three years of night-time air raids to her friends upon the couple's return to Australia in 1940. In May 1938, he advised the Chief of the Air Staff, Air Vice-Marshal Richard Williams: "there is a first-class war on here, which must eventually affect Australia and its defence schemes". Williams and other members of the RAAF may have perceived Malley as exaggerating the importance of his role in China, particularly given his apparent delight in its ceremonial aspects. In one letter, he regaled Williams with stories of an inspection tour around the country, declaring: "I ... can just imagine how much you would have enjoyed it – landing on aerodromes that were all polished up for inspection. Being met by provincial dignitaries and lavishly entertained. I had to drink every conceivable Chinese wine that was ever made, and to eat foods unheard of in Australia!" At any rate, Malley's reports of Japanese air tactics, and the value his observations might have held for Australia in the event of war in the Pacific, were largely discounted by his home government.

== World War II and later life ==
Malley was recalled to Australia in July 1940, departing China with a note of thanks from May-Ling for his "loyal service" before rejoining the RAAF on active service as a squadron leader in October. He became the Air Force representative at the Combined Operational Intelligence Centre (COIC), Melbourne, a tri-service organisation responsible for intelligence collection, analysis and dissemination. Drawing on his knowledge of Japanese raids on Chinese airfields in the 1930s, Malley visited several RAAF stations in northern Australia to advise on protective measures; it became evident in the wake of the attack on Darwin in February 1942 that none of his recommendations had been implemented. COIC primarily handled naval intelligence, so Army and Air Force participation was part-time initially. By April 1941, Malley had been assigned a full-time role, and the RAAF was maintaining a round-the-clock presence. He was promoted to honorary wing commander in October 1941, and two months later succeeded Commander Rupert Long as Director of COIC. Malley was raised to acting group captain on 1 July 1942, but ill health forced him to relinquish his post on 3 October. He was discharged from the Air Force as medically unfit on 9 June 1943. General Douglas MacArthur praised Malley for his "foresight, planning, and organizational ability". The former aviator went on to work as officer-in-charge of the Chinese section at the Commonwealth Security Service in Canberra from January 1944 to March 1947 as an honorary group captain.

... in attempting to evaluate his role and importance – both within the Australian aviation scene but more particularly the decade he spent in China ... it is plainly inappropriate to dismiss or discount his contribution; yet equally it is not possible to verify all that he claimed, and therefore to attach the same weight or significance as he did in assessing his impact and influence.

— Historian Chris Coulthard-Clark on Garnet Malley

In 1948, Malley's war service was recognised by the United States with the award of the Legion of Merit. By 1949, he had procured a yacht, the Royal Flight, which was used as a setting in the film The Blue Lagoon. The following year, the family bought a coconut plantation on Vanua Balavu, Fiji. In September 1951, Malley and his wife toured the world, visiting Algiers, Guadeloupe, Curaçao, Martinique, and Tahiti. They subsequently returned to live on their Fijian plantation, and rode out the 1953 Suva earthquake and tsunami.

Garnet Malley died of a heart attack on 20 May 1961. Survived by his wife and son, he was buried at sea in an Anglican ceremony. The commander-in-chief of the Taiwanese air force sent condolences, paying tribute to the "invaluable" contribution Malley had made during his decade in China, which would "be long remembered".
