= Hartley Vale =

- Town
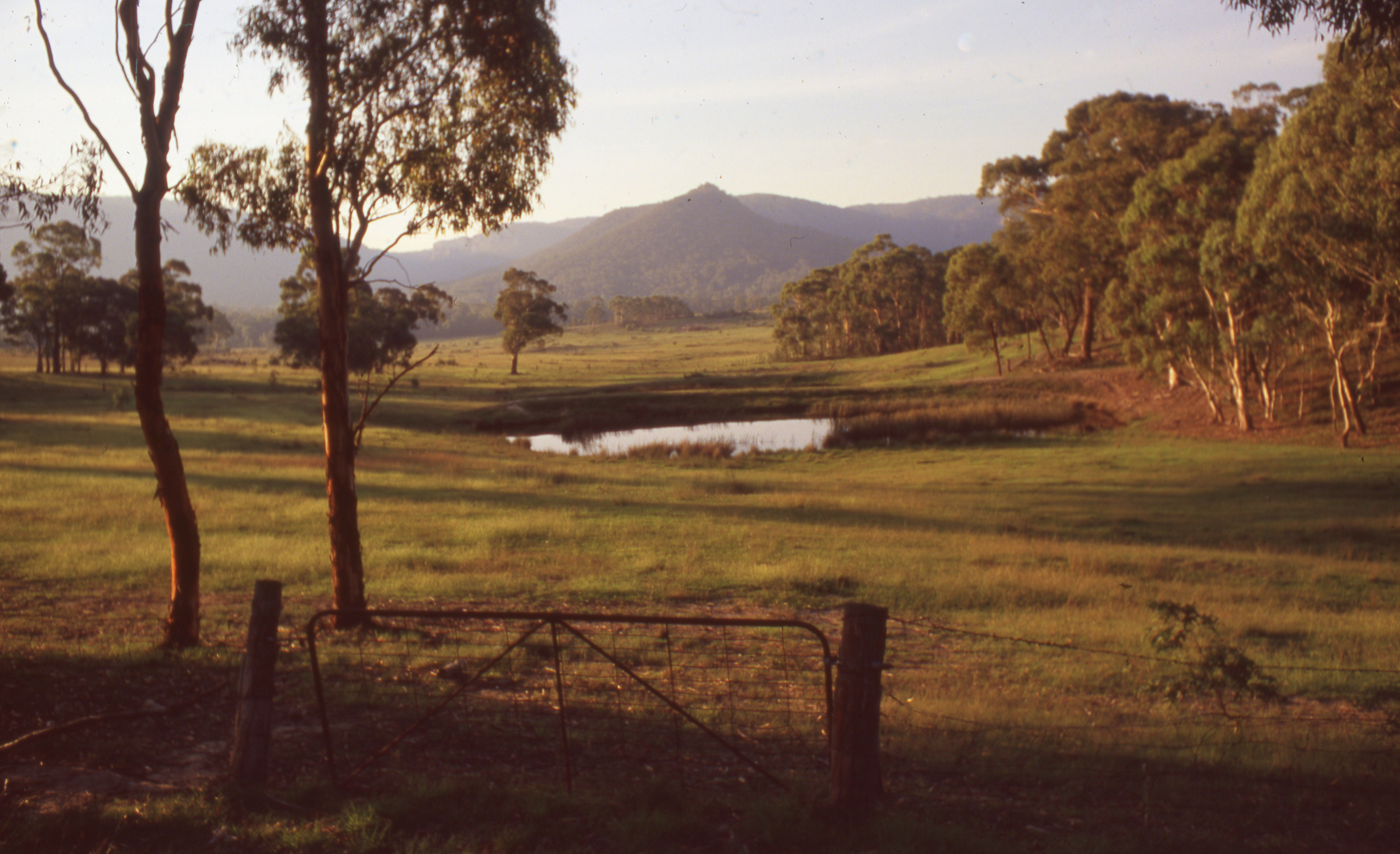
- Countryside at Hartley Vale

- Coordinates: 33°32′S 150°14′E
- Country: Australia
- State: New South Wales
- LGA: City of Lithgow
- Location: 125 km (78 mi) W of Sydney; 10 km (6.2 mi) W of Mount Victoria; 12 km (7.5 mi) SE of Lithgow

Government
  - State electorate: Bathurst
  - Federal division: Macquarie (formerly Calare)
- Elevation: 820 m (2,690 ft)
- Postcode: 2790
- County: Cook
- Parish: Hartley
- Mean max temp: 18.3 °C (64.9 °F)
- Mean min temp: 6.3 °C (43.3 °F)
- Annual rainfall: 860.1 mm (33.86 in)
Localities around Hartley Vale
Lithgow	Dargan	Bell
Hartley	Hartley Vale	Bell
Little Hartley	Mount York	Mount Victoria

Hartley Vale is a small village in the Blue Mountains area of New South Wales, Australia. It is approximately 150 kilometres west of Sydney and 12 kilometres south-east of Lithgow. It is in the local government area of the City of Lithgow.

== Description ==
Hartley Vale is centred on Hartley Vale Road, which stretches from Darling Causeway to the Great Western Highway. The area is largely open countryside with many substantial private properties, bounded by the River Lett to the north and Mount York to the south. The village is approximately five kilometres west of the Main Western Railway — which runs from Sydney to Lithgow and beyond—and ten kilometres from the nearest railway station at Bell.

== History ==
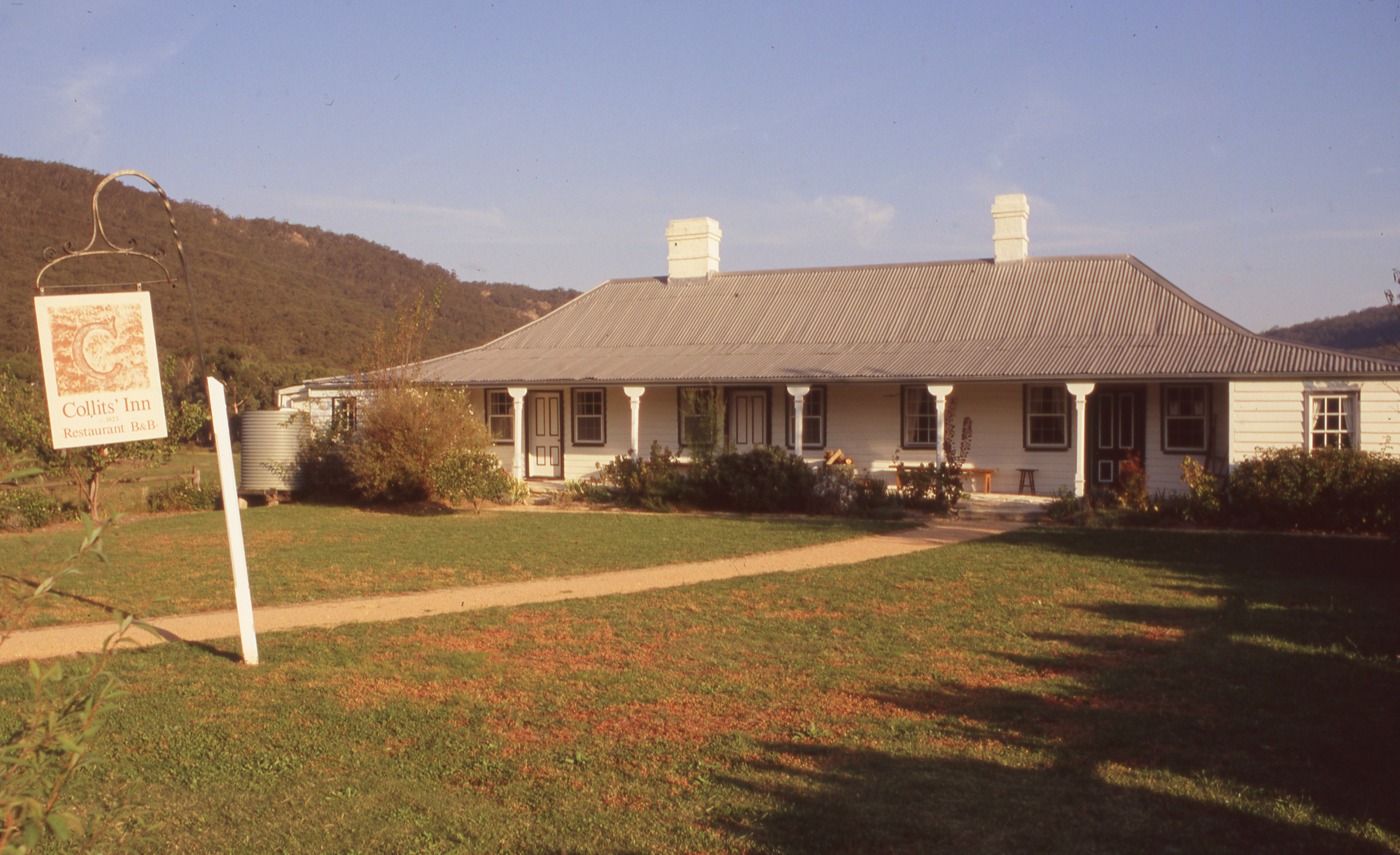
Collits Inn

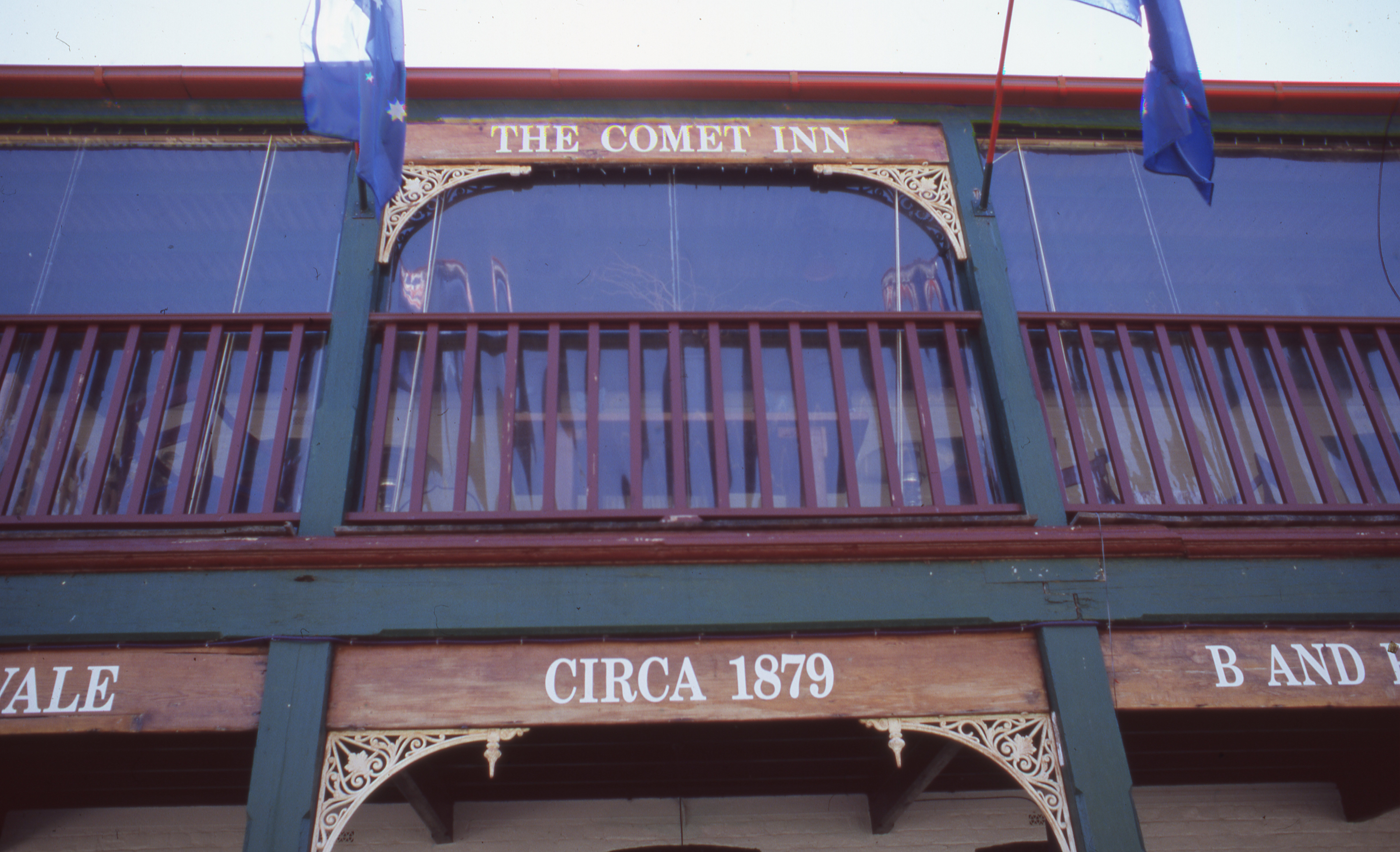
Comet Inn

The valley is an historic area where the early roads over the Blue Mountains came down into the plains found to the west of the mountains. The first road through the mountains was built by William Cox from 1814-1815. Parts of his original road can still be seen at Mount York, immediately south of Hartley Vale, and have been incorporated into a walking track.

A kilometre east of Coxs Road is Lockyers Road, which was started in 1828 by Major Lockyer as an alternative crossing to Coxs Road, but was never finished. It goes down into the valley and finishes slightly west of the Hartley Vale village. Another kilometre east is Lawsons Long Alley, which was started as an alternative road by William Lawson, with the aim of avoiding the steep grades of Coxs Road at Mount York. While building the road, Lawson discovered what he thought was coal, but which was in fact oil shale. The deposit was examined by Rev. W. B.Clarke in 1841, and he wrote a paper on it in 1861. A sample of the oil shale was exhibited at the Paris Exposition.

Mining began in the 1860s and a rail line was constructed into the valley of Kerosene Creek. The incline was designed by Norman Selfe who would also design what is now the Katoomba Scenic Railway. Hartley Vale Station was created on the Main Western Line, but closed in 1975 and no longer exists. About 40 feet below the shale seam was a seam of coal, discovered around 1874, which could be used as fuel to support retorts and a refinery.

Hartley Vale was the longest lived of the oil shale mining and refining sites in New South Wales, with operations occurring between 1865 and 1910. Originally worked by two separate companies, the operation progressed significantly once these companies merged, in 1872, to form the New South Wales Shale & Oil Company. The new company set up new retorts and a refinery at Harley Vale. In April 1906, the company and its operations at Hartley Vale and Torbane were acquired by the Commonwealth Oil Corporation.

Mining and retorting operations at Hartley Vale ceased in 1910, while the refinery was expanded in the same year, to process crude oil from the oil shale mining and retorting operations at Torbane. The refinery at Hartley Vale first closed, around August 1913. but it lingered on, until around May 1914, the final end of oil industry at Hartley Vale. There are still some remnants of the shale oil operations there.

The village had a school, from 1872 until 1956, with the exception of 1946-1947.

Lawsons Long Alley goes through the valley of Kerosene Creek and joins Waltons Road, which goes to Hartley Vale Road on the east side of the village. Lawsons Long Alley and Lockyers Road, along with Coxs Road, were developed as walking tracks by the Department of Lands, New South Wales. They all lead to the Hartley Vale area, culminating at a picnic area just west of the village.

Hartley Vale was on the original route of the westernmost part of Bell's Line of Road, prior to construction of the connection between that road at Bell and Lithgow. Hartley Vale Road, where it descends into the valley, follows a part of the original Bell's Line route.

Other notable landmarks in the area are the Comet Inn, which dates back to 1879 and is located in the centre of the village, and Collits Inn, which dates back to 1823 and is approximately one and a half kilometres west of the village. The Hartley Vale Cemetery is just a small distance south-west of Collits Inn.

The Hartley Vale area also includes a range of other tourist facilities.

== Heritage listings ==
Hartley Vale has a number of heritage-listed sites, including:

- Hartley Vale Road: Collits' Inn
- Site of oil-shale works, Hartley Vale
