= Little Hartley =

- Town
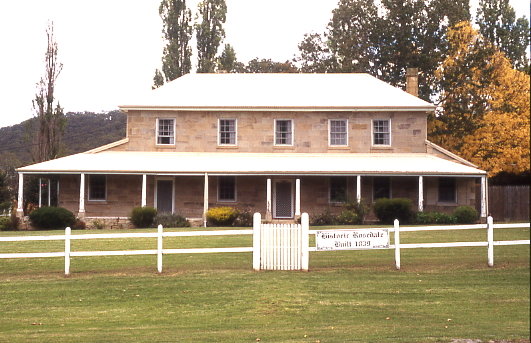
- Rosedale

- Coordinates: 33°32′S 150°14′E
- Country: Australia
- State: New South Wales
- LGA: City of Lithgow
- Location: 125 km (78 mi) WNW of Sydney; 20 km (12 mi) NNW of Katoomba; 5 km (3.1 mi) W of Mount Victoria; 20 km (12 mi) SE of Lithgow

Government
  - State electorate: Bathurst
  - Federal division: Macquarie (formerly Calare)
- Elevation: 820 m (2,690 ft)
- Postcode: 2790
- Parish: Lett
- Mean max temp: 18.3 °C (64.9 °F)
- Mean min temp: 6.3 °C (43.3 °F)
- Annual rainfall: 860.1 mm (33.86 in)
Localities around Little Hartley
Hartley	Lithgow	Mount York
Coxs River	Little Hartley
		Mount Victoria

Little Hartley is a village in the Central West region of New South Wales, Australia. It is located approximately 150 kilometres west-northwest of Sydney and 20 kilometres south-east of Lithgow, on the Great Western Highway. It is in the local government area of the City of Lithgow, the state seat of Bathurst and the Federal Division of Calare.

== Description ==
Little Hartley is a collection of properties in a rural setting, distributed on both sides of the Great Western Highway. The most prominent landmarks are Rosedale, on the west side of the highway, and Meads Farm on the east side. Other properties in the area include The Grange (the site of an art gallery), Harp of Erin (formerly William's Store), Ambermere (formerly the Rose Inn), Deloraine Park, Tathra, Nioka, Niangala, Glyn Ruthin, Kariba, Bimbadgen and Bimbimbi. There is a caravan park in Browns Gap Road, a sale yards on the west side of the highway, and a cemetery on the east side. A proposed tunnel is being costed to connect Blackheath to Little Hartley. It will be the longest tunnel in Australia.

== History ==
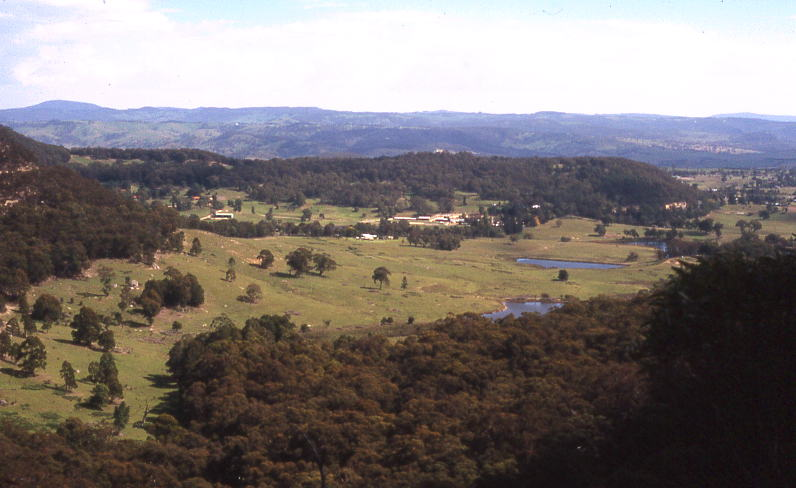
View towards Little Hartley, from Berghofers Pass

The most prominent property, Rosedale, was built in 1839 for William Cummings. It was originally licensed as the Coach and Horses, but the name was later changed to Victoria Inn. In 1903 it was acquired by W.J.Berghofer, who was responsible for building Berghofer's Pass at Mount York in 1912. Berghofer renamed the building Rosenthal, but it was eventually renamed Rosedale. It is now listed with the National Trust.

Mead's Farm, about two kilometres north-west of Rosedale, dates back to a land grant of forty hectares given to Hugh Beattie in 1856. It was operated as the Kerosene Inn between 1867 and 1880, during which time it was used by the miners who worked at the shale mine in Hartley Vale. Some of its owners over the years were Louis Meads, from 1872, Captain George Stevens, and Captain Thomas Rowntree, who was an early mayor of Balmain. Like Rosedale, Meads Farm is listed with the National Trust.
