= Jane Sinclair Reid =

Australian educator of blind students (1883–1968)

Jane Sinclair Reid MBE
- Born: 21 December 1883; Esk Bank, Hartley, New South Wales, Australia
- Died: 19 October 1968 (aged 84); Roseville, Sydney, New South Wales, Australia
- Occupation: Educator of blind students
- Years active: 1904-1948

Jane Sinclair Reid MBE (21 December 1883 –19 October 1968), also known as Roberta Reid, was an Australian educator who specialised in teaching blind students.

== Biography ==
Reid was born on 21 December 1883 at Esk Bank, Hartley, New South Wales, Australia, to a family of Presbyterians of Scottish descent. She was also known as Roberta Reid.

Reid was educated at Sydney Girls' High School and then studied at the University of Sydney, graduating in 1904. After graduating, she learned braille and began working for the New South Wales Institution for the Deaf and Dumb and the Blind (Royal New South Wales Institution for Deaf and Blind Children). She was appointed a headmistress within two years and worked teaching blind students until she retired in 1948.

Reid was appointed Member of the Order of the British Empire (MBE) in 1951.

Reid died in on 19 October 1968 in Roseville, Sydney, New South Wales, Australia.
