= Mount Victoria Manor =

Historic building in New South Wales, Australia

Coordinates: 33°35′19″S 150°15′15″E

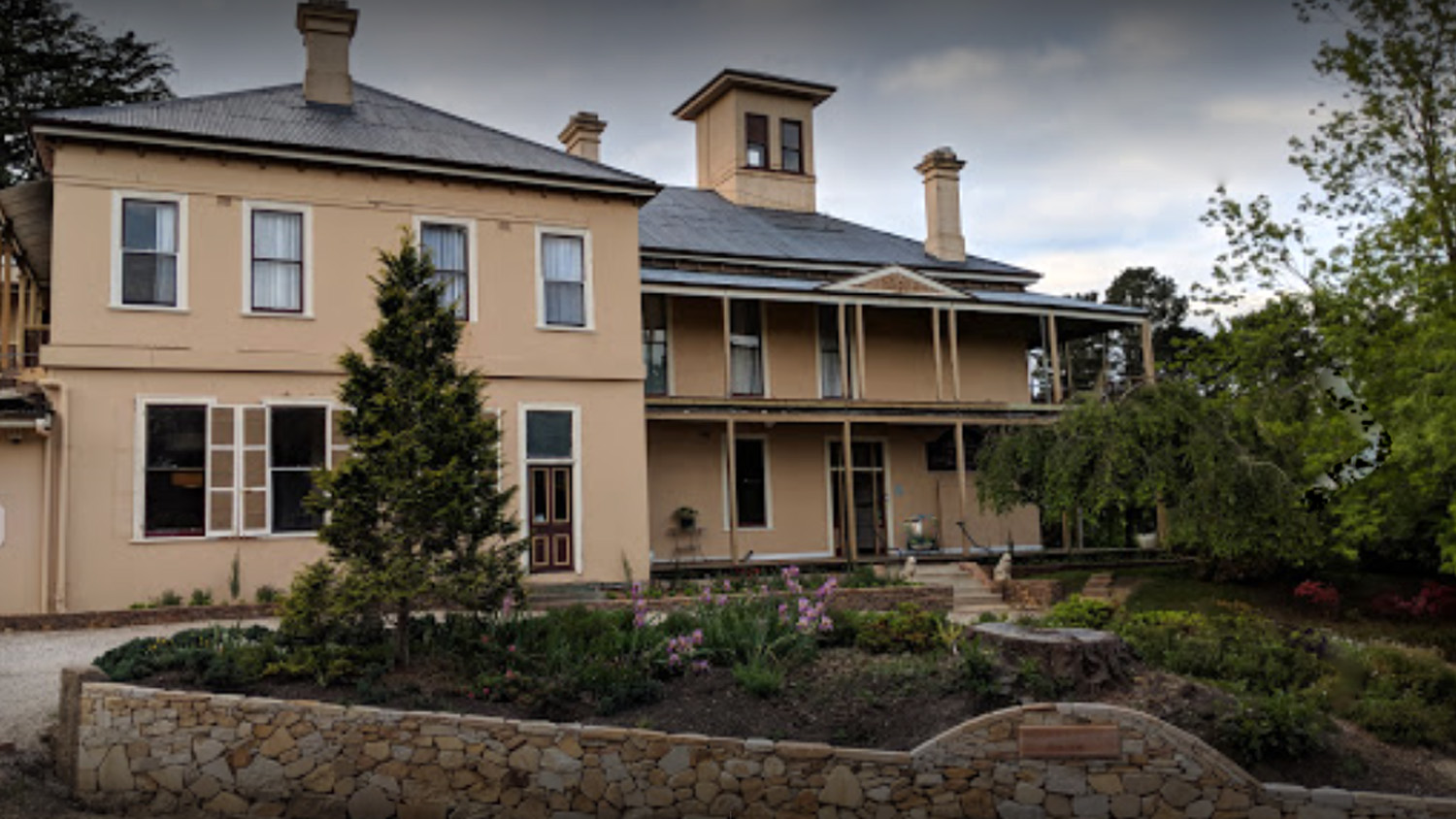
Mount Victoria Manor

Mount Victoria Manor in Mount Victoria, New South Wales is a building of historical significance and is listed on the New South Wales Heritage Register. It was built in 1876 by the Fairfax family as a mountain retreat and was owned by them for the next decade. It then was purchased by the Cooper family and converted to one of the most luxurious hotels in the Blue Mountains. It remained in this family until 1966 and was then the property of various proprietors until 2015 when it became known as Mount Victoria Manor. Today it is a hotel which provides accommodation, restaurant and bar facilities and is a venue for special events particularly weddings.

== The Fairfax family ==
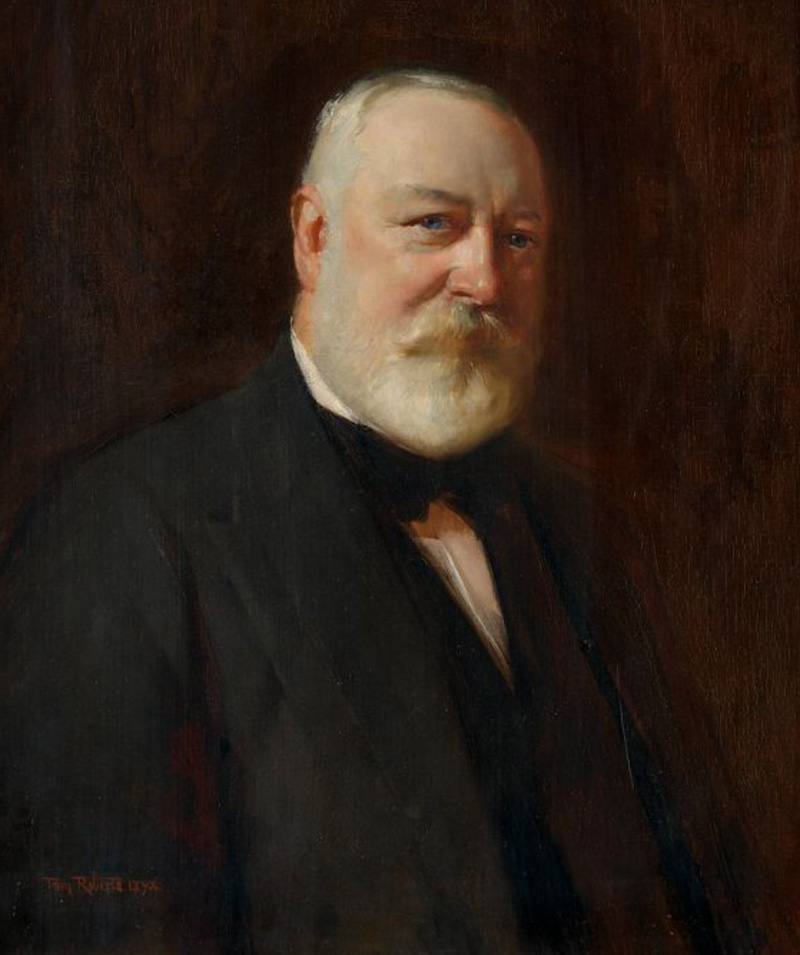
Sir James Reading Fairfax, son of John Fairfax

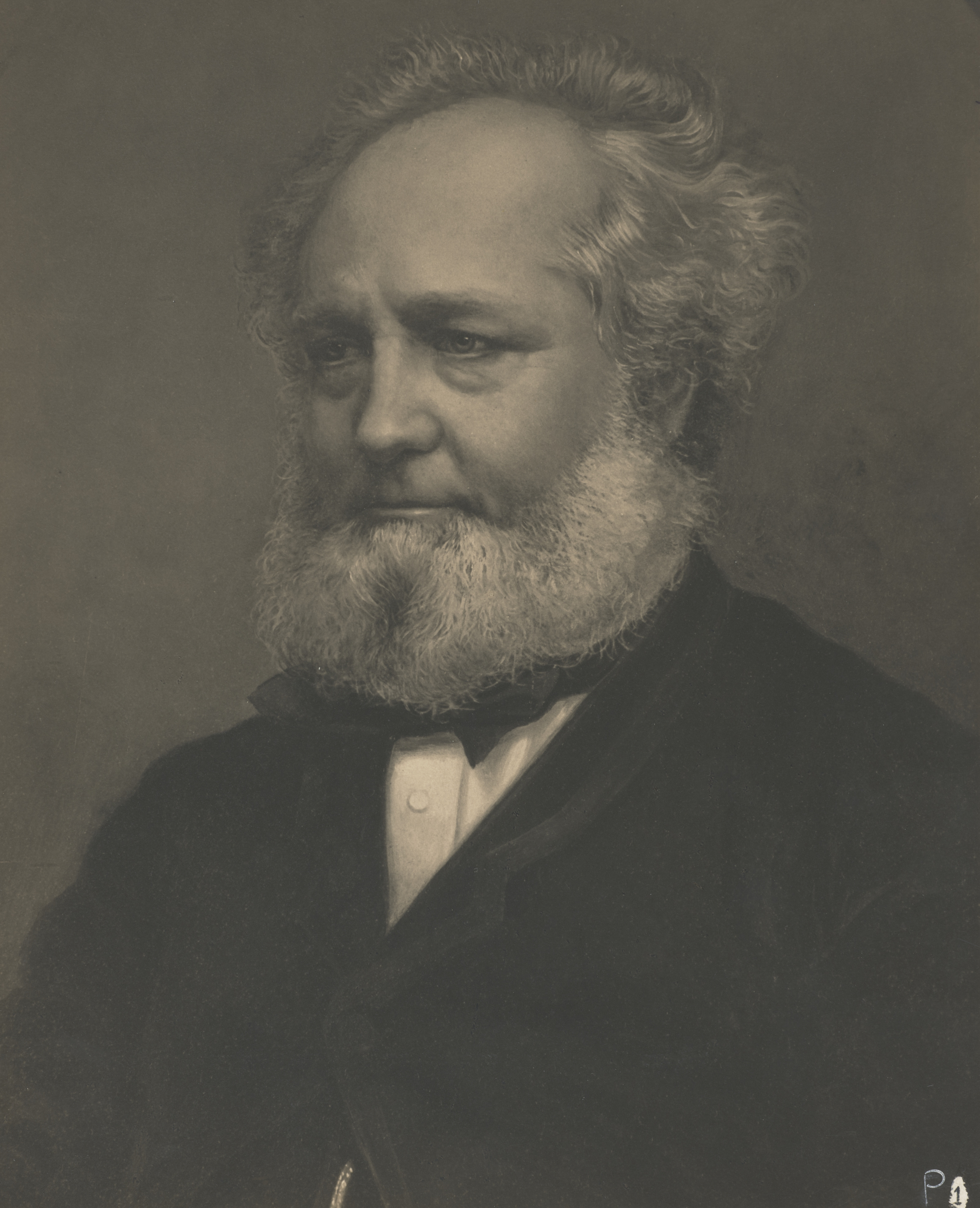
John Fairfax

The Fairfax family owned the property between 1876 and 1887. It was built jointly in 1876 by John Fairfax (1804–1877) and his son Sir James Reading Fairfax (1834–1919) and was called “Manor House”. John died in 1877 and left his half of the house to his daughter in law Anne Fairfax. She was the widow of his son Charles John Fairfax (1829–1864). In 1878 she sold her share to Sir James Reading Fairfax making him the sole owner. The architect of the house was Alexander Dean who was a prominent professional of that time. The Fairfax monogram can still be seen at the entrance and front of the main house John Fairfax (1804–1877) was the founder of the Sydney Morning Herald in 1842. He also bought the first steam press to be used for printing a newspaper in Australia. In 1856 he started the firm John Fairfax and Sons and his son James became a partner. Sir James Reading Fairfax was born in 1834 in Warwickshire, England and at the age of four migrated with his family to Australia. In 1856 he married Lucy Armstrong, the daughter of John Armstrong, surveyor. The couple had six sons and a daughter.

Sir James loved art and music. He was a trustee and president of the Art Gallery of New South Wales. In order to promote art he offered valuable prizes for pencil drawings. He travelled widely with his family, enjoying the art galleries of Europe.

The Manor erected by the Fairfax family was very large and consisted of two adjoining residences. In 1882 when the family still owned them they were described as “two mountain villas with ornamental grounds, paddock a few yards from Mount Victoria railway station. They were outlined in detail in a real estate advertisement at the time which can be seen at this reference. The two adjoining houses were advertised for sale in two separate lots with the second smaller residence having a cottage. However, it seems that after they were advertised for sale the Fairfax family decided to keep the houses and instead rent them as one property to several tenants.

The first tenant was George William Atkin who provided accommodation and offered transport to the Caves. In 1885 he moved to Paddington and the house was rented to Jessie Mary Ennis who ran it as a boarding house. However in 1886 she was injured in a serious railway accident and returned to Sydney. The Manor was then rented to the Wilkins family who ran it as a boarding school for girls for a year. In 1887 the property was sold to the Cooper family.

== The Cooper family ==
The Cooper family owned the Manor for the next eighty years. George Hubbard Cooper (1845-1919) who bought the property in 1887 was born in 1845 in Sydney. His father was Captain John Cooper, Master Mariner who for some years owned the Rose and Crown Hotel in Argyle Street at The Rocks. In 1869 he married Margaret Hutchinson (1849-1935) who was the daughter Thomas Hutchinson, a builder of Surry Hills. The couple had one son and three daughters. George also became a builder and entered into partnership with George Wilson to become the firm Cooper and Wilson, builders and contractors at Forest Lodge in Sydney.

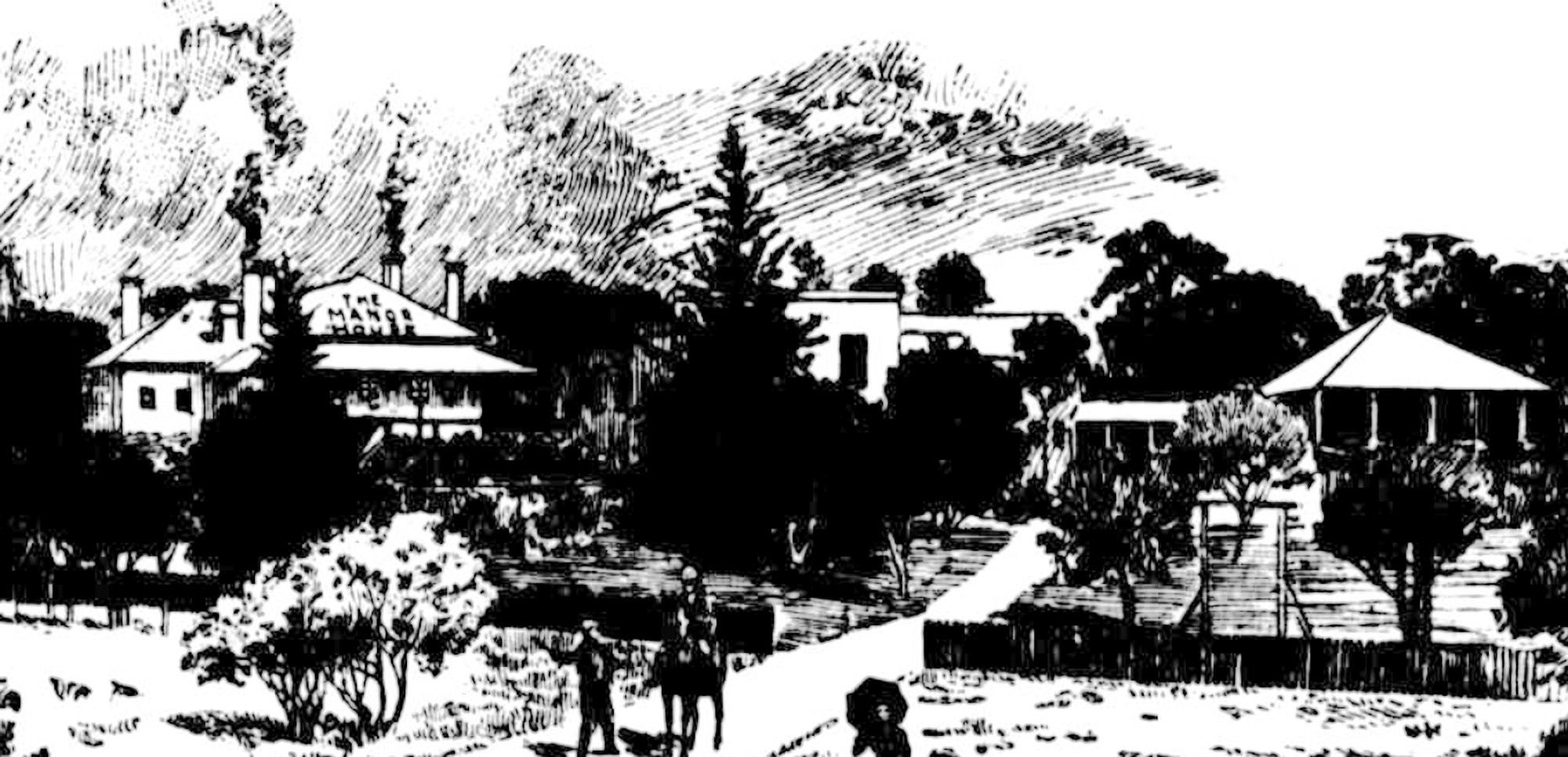
Picture accompanying the description of the building in 1890

In 1887 he bought “The Manor House” and by 1890 made major additions to the property. The following is the description in a newspaper of these additions.

"The Manor House, which occupies one of the most commanding positions in the little town of Mount Victoria, was at one time the property of Mr. J. R. Fairfax, who once made this beautiful neighbourhood his home. Since then it has passed into the hands of Mr. G. H. Cooper who, by the expenditure of nearly two thousand pounds devoted to its enlargement and the making of several extensive additions, has converted it into one of the most comfortable and convenient boarding-houses to be met with on the mountains. The grounds, which are exceedingly spacious, containing seven acres of land, are planted with shade trees, and the whole estate bears evidence of the taste which has been expended upon its adornment.

In addition to the original houses, which were built with every regard to comfort, Mr. Cooper has lately added a large brick building containing twenty-six bedrooms, and four double rooms, all large, lofty, and splendidly ventilated. A billiard - room and large dining - room are contained in a house adjoining in fact, the whole establishment is comprised of a series of buildings which occupy the crest of the ridge, which affords an extensive view of the Valley of the Grose and the Mount Victoria coal mines. At least one hundred people can now be accommodated at Mr. Cooper's establishment.

From the verandah of the Manor House one overlooks the buildings of the township, the railway station, and a vast stretch of undulating country, broken by many hollows, which is one of the chief characteristics of mountain scenery, each succeeding ridge being bluer or more purple than the last, until the picture sinks away into a distance which mingles with the sky."

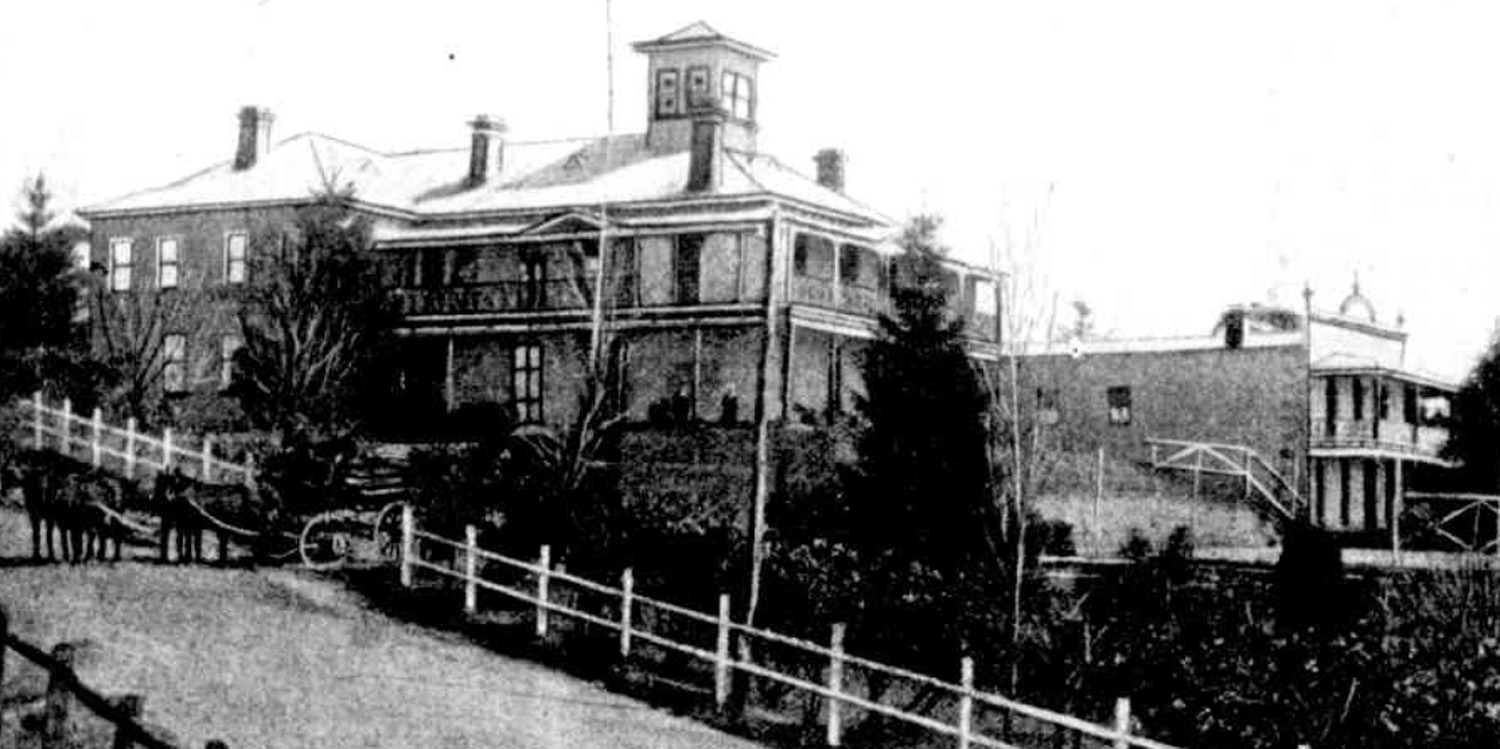
Mount Victoria Manor in 1898

Over the next eight years, the Coopers made further alterations including the tower which can be seen in the 1898 photo of the property. In addition, the name was changed to "The Grand Hotel". This later became “Coopers Grand Hotel”. Besides accommodation the Coopers provided a horse-drawn coach service to the Jenolan Caves. A description of this service in 1905 as well as the hotel is given in this reference.

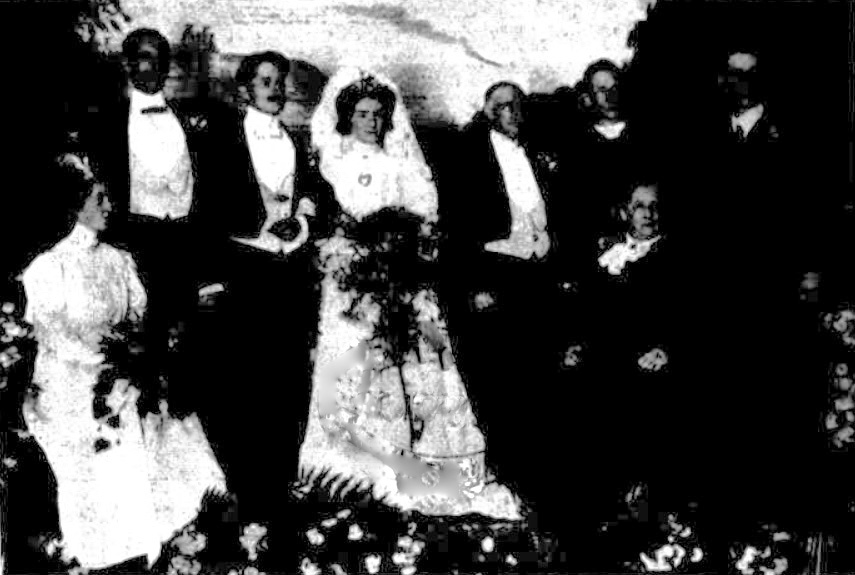
Wedding of Emily Hutchinson Cooper in 1908

One of the Coopers daughters whose name was Emily Maud Margarita Cooper was a famous soprano of that time. She adopted the stage name of Emily Hutchinson Cooper. In 1908 she was married to George Edward Roberts in Mount Victoria and the wedding reception was held at the Manor House Hotel. A description of the wedding appeared in many newspapers at that time. Melbourne Punch published the wedding photo (shown) and described the marriage in the following terms.

"On Wednesday evening. April 29th, at the Presbyterian Church, Mount Victoria, the wedding took place of Mr. George Edward Roberts and Miss Emily Hutchinson Cooper, daughter of Mr. and Mrs. Cooper, of the Grand Hotel, Mount Victoria. The ceremony was performed by the Rev. G. A. Gordon. Miss Hurley played the Bridal March from Lohengrin as the bride entered the church leaning on the arm of her father. She wore a beautiful gown of white satin duchesse veiled in lace, and her veil of hand-embroidered net was worn over a wreath of orange blossoms. Her shower bouquet oi white carnations and asparagus fern, and a pearl and ruby brooch were the bridegroom's gifts. Miss Florrie Cooper, who attended her sister as bridesmaid, wore a frock of pale blue paillette, trimmed with embroidered applique, and a silver butterfly in the coiffure. Her shower bouquet of roses and pearl and opal brooch pendant were the bridegroom's gifts. Captain C. W. H. Coulter, of the 3rd Mounted Infantry, was best man. During the wedding the choir sang “How Welcome was the Call," and Miss Ethel Hurley sang "God' Be With You Till We Meet Again” with organ accompaniment by her sister.

"After the ceremony Mr. and Mrs. Cooper held a. reception and dance at the Grand Hotel (now Mount Victoria Manor), at which there were over 200 guests present. Mrs. Cooper wore a handsome dress of black merveilleux relieved with lace." George died in 1919 and his obituary appeared in the Sydney Morning Herald. His wife Margaret continued running the hotel with the help of her daughter Alice Elizabeth Ward (1872-1950). In 1930 the Coopers sold the hotel to John Twinn but two years later in 1932 Alice bought it back. Alice operated the hotel until her death in 1950. Her daughter Florence Margaret Hutchinson Ward then inherited the property and became the proprietor of the hotel.

The building was then sold to the Logos Foundation who named it Westwood Lodge. In 1988 the Patterson Family purchased the property and the name was changed to The Grand. In 1991 the Lenton Family bought the property and the name was changed back to The Blue Mountains Manor House. The current owners purchased the hotel in 2015 and the property is now known as Mount Victoria Manor.

In 2020 registered charity Project Etico Australia, leased the property and started operating Hotel Etico, Australia's first social enterprise hotel, employing and training young people with disability in hospitality and independent living.

== Gallery ==
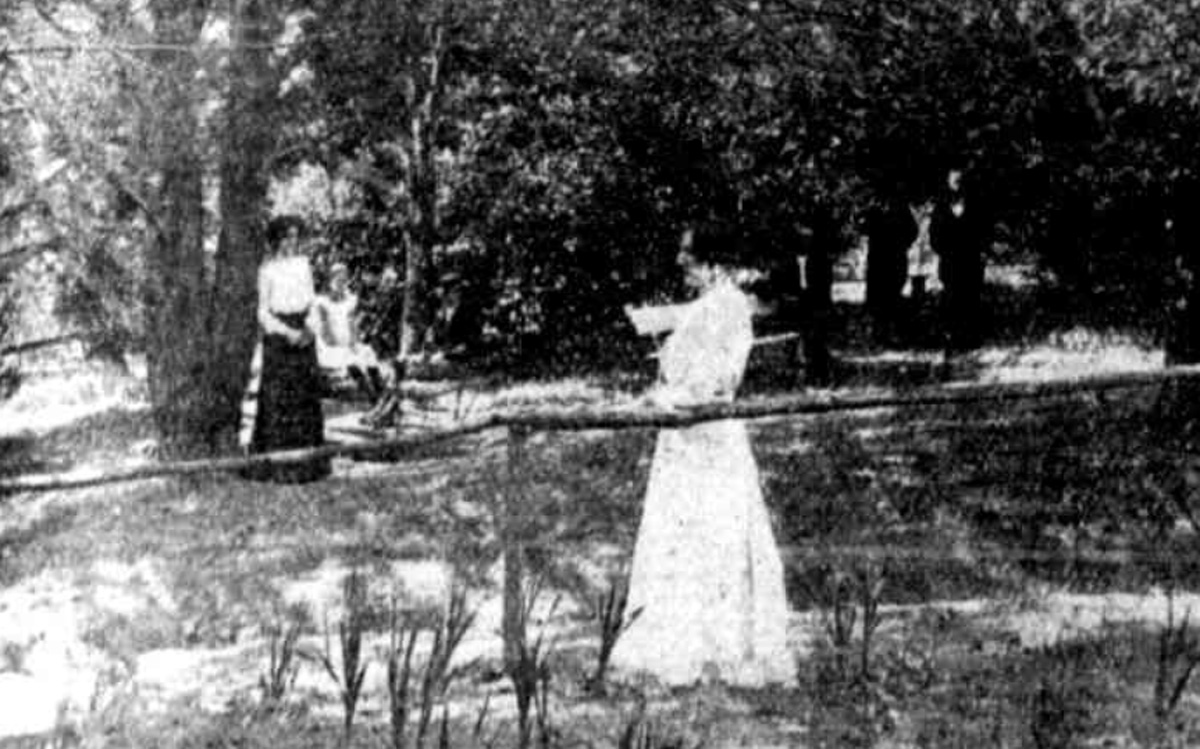
Ladies in the grounds of Mount Victoria Manor in 1904.

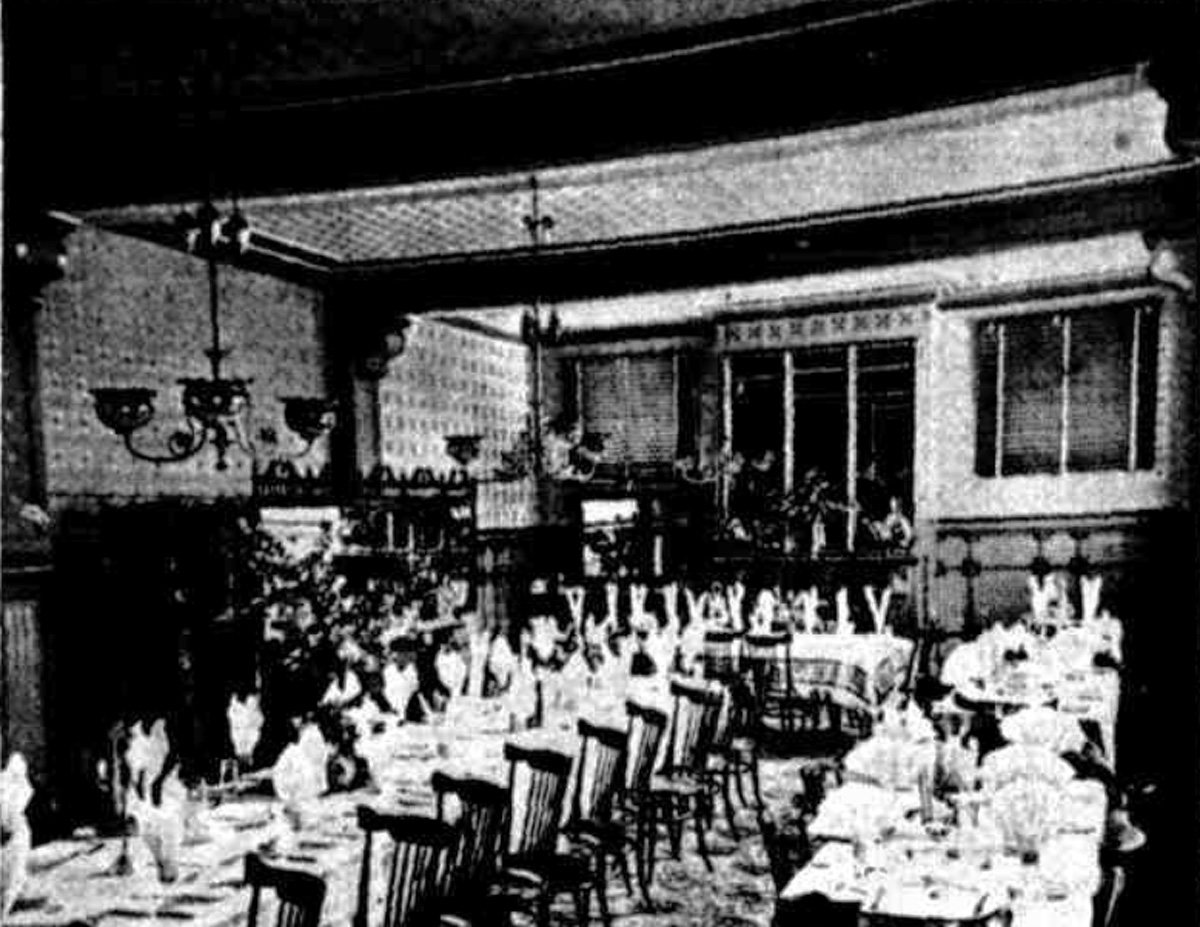
Dining room of Mount Victoria Manor in 1903.

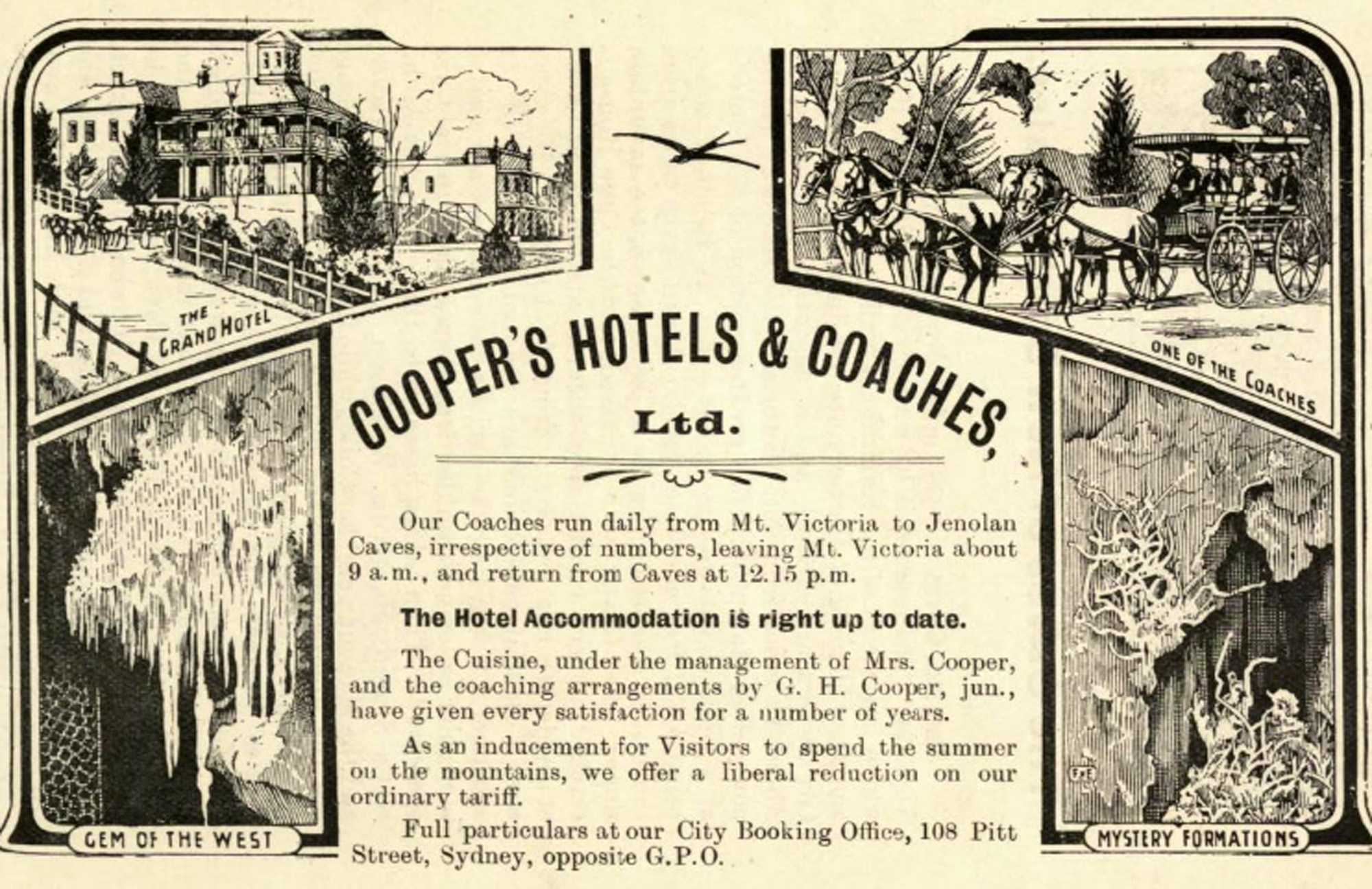
Advertisement for the hotel and excursions to Jenolan Caves in 1909.
