= Hartley, New South Wales =

Hartley New South Wales
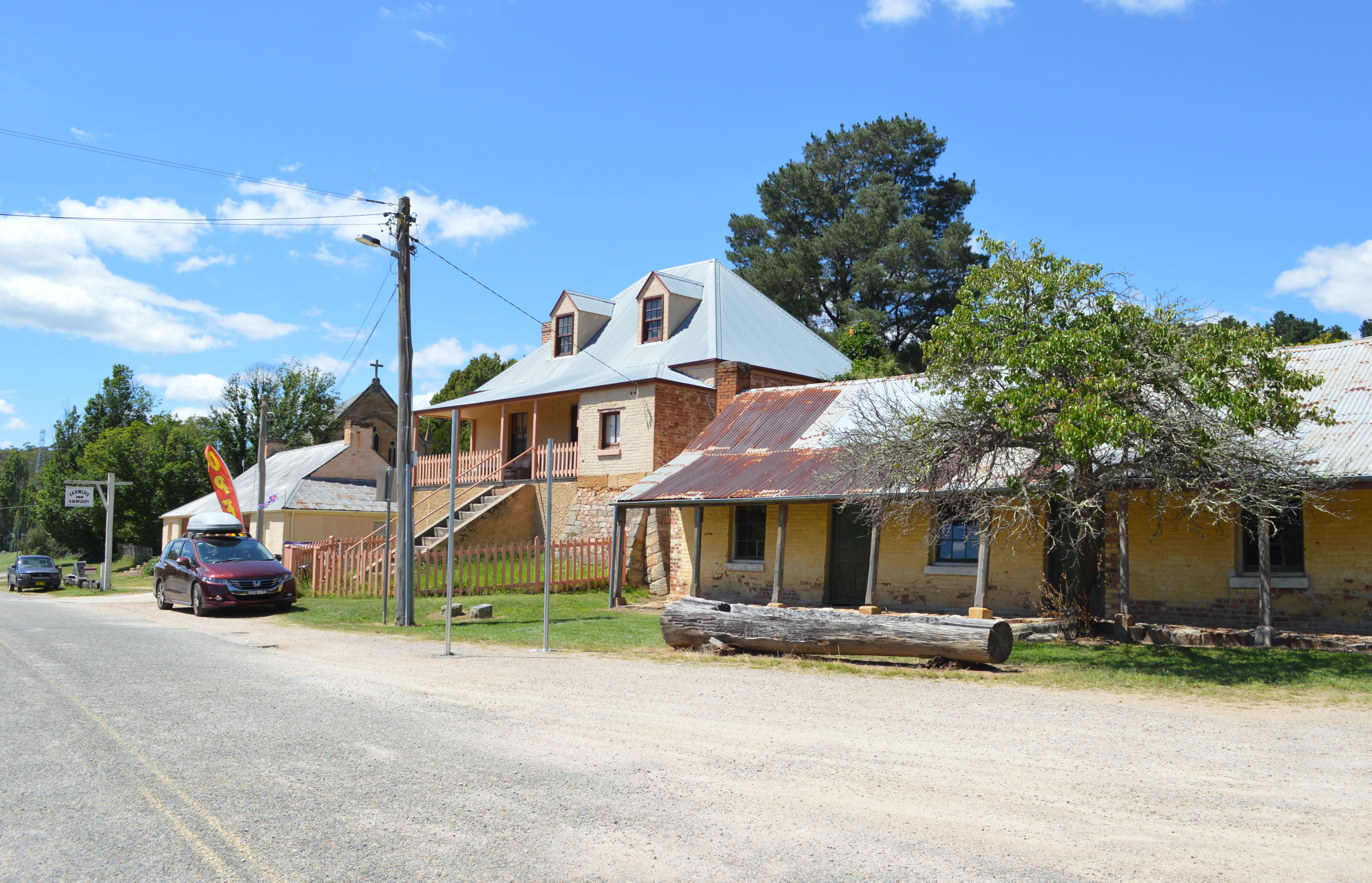
- The main street of Hartley, showing the Shamrock Inn, Ivy Cottage and the Farmer's Inn

- Coordinates: 33°33′S 150°11′E
- Population: 478 (2021 census)
- Postcode(s): 2790
- Elevation: 792 m (2,598 ft)
- Location: 127 km (79 mi) W of Sydney; 12 km (7 mi) S of Lithgow; 9 km (6 mi) NW of Mount Victoria; 26 km (16 mi) NW of Katoomba
- LGA(s): City of Lithgow
- State electorate(s): Bathurst
- Federal division(s): Calare
Mean max temp	Mean min temp	Annual rainfall
28 °C; 82 °F	?	?
Localities around Hartley:
South Bowenfels		Hartley Vale
Mount Blaxland	Hartley	Mount York
		Little Hartley

Hartley is a historical village in the Central West region of New South Wales, Australia, within the City of Lithgow local government area, located approximately 127 kilometres (79 mi) west of Sydney. Hartley is located below the western escarpment of the Blue Mountains.

It was once a major administrative centre on the Great Western Highway. It has since fallen into decline, replaced by other towns that are on the railway line. At the 2021 census, Hartley had a population of 478 people.

== History ==
Hartley was formerly a judicial and administrative centre that had a busy courthouse. The courthouse was built in 1837 and was designed by prominent New South Wales Colonial Architect Mortimer Lewis. The courthouse, which operated for over fifty years, dealt with a constant stream of robbers, thieves and convicts. Although Hartley fell into disuse, it survived as a perfectly preserved village that is a superb example of 19th century architecture. Because of its heritage value, it is now preserved as a historic site, administered by the National Parks and Wildlife Service of New South Wales. Situated 10 kilometres (6.2 mi) west of Mount Victoria and 12 kilometres (7.5 mi) south of Lithgow, it is open to the public every day (except Christmas Day and Easter Sunday). The Hartley Historic Site, an area of 7.7 hectares (19 acres), is listed on the Register of the National Estate.

Hartley's sister villages, Little Hartley and Hartley Vale, still survive as residential villages with a heritage of their own. Little Hartley, situated 4 kilometres (2.5 mi) south-east of Hartley, is the site of the historic home Rosedale. Hartley Vale, situated 6 kilometres (3.7 mi) east of Hartley, is the site of the Comet Inn, Collits Inn and Hartley Vale cemetery. There is also a network of historic walking tracks between Hartley Vale and Mount York, administered by the Lands Department of New South Wales.

== Heritage listings ==
Hartley has a number of heritage-listed sites, including:

- Great Western Highway: Hartley historic site
- 200 Jenolan Caves Road: Military Station archaeological site
- The Old Bathurst Road: Cox's Road and Early Deviations – Hartley, Clarence Hilly Range and Mount Blaxland Precinct

== Notable person ==
- Jane Sinclair Reid (1883–1968), educator who specialised in teaching blind students

== See also ==
- River Lett

Media related to Hartley, New South Wales at Wikimedia Commons

== Gallery ==
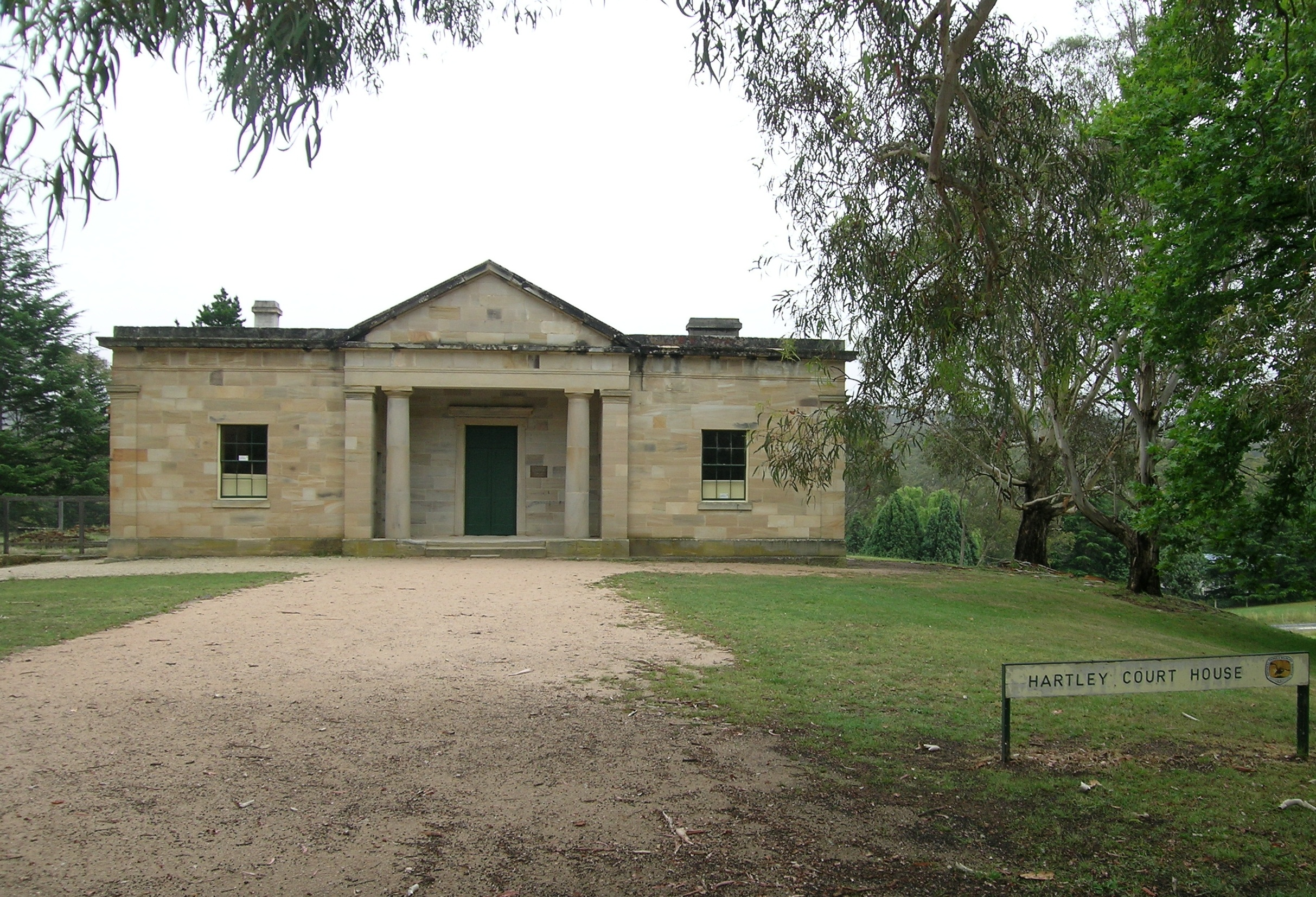
Court house (1837), designed by Mortimer Lewis

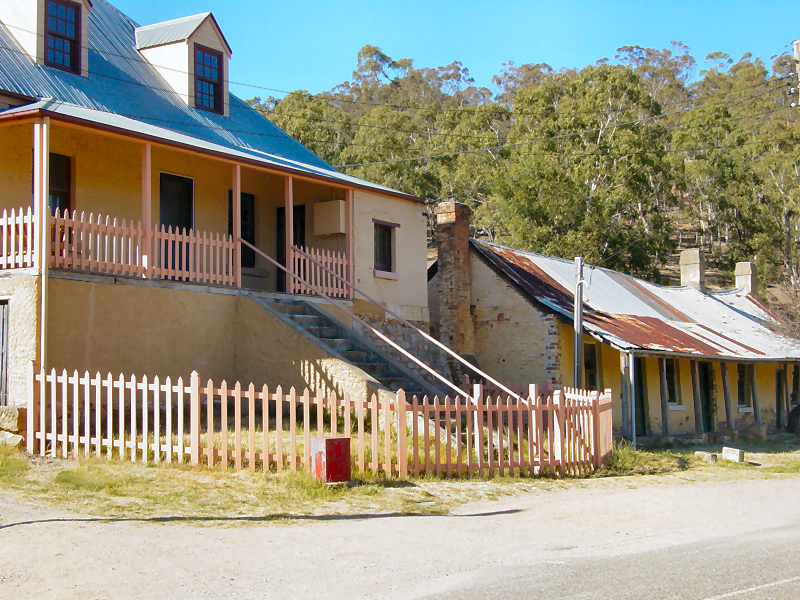
Ivy Cottage and Shamrock Inn at Hartley

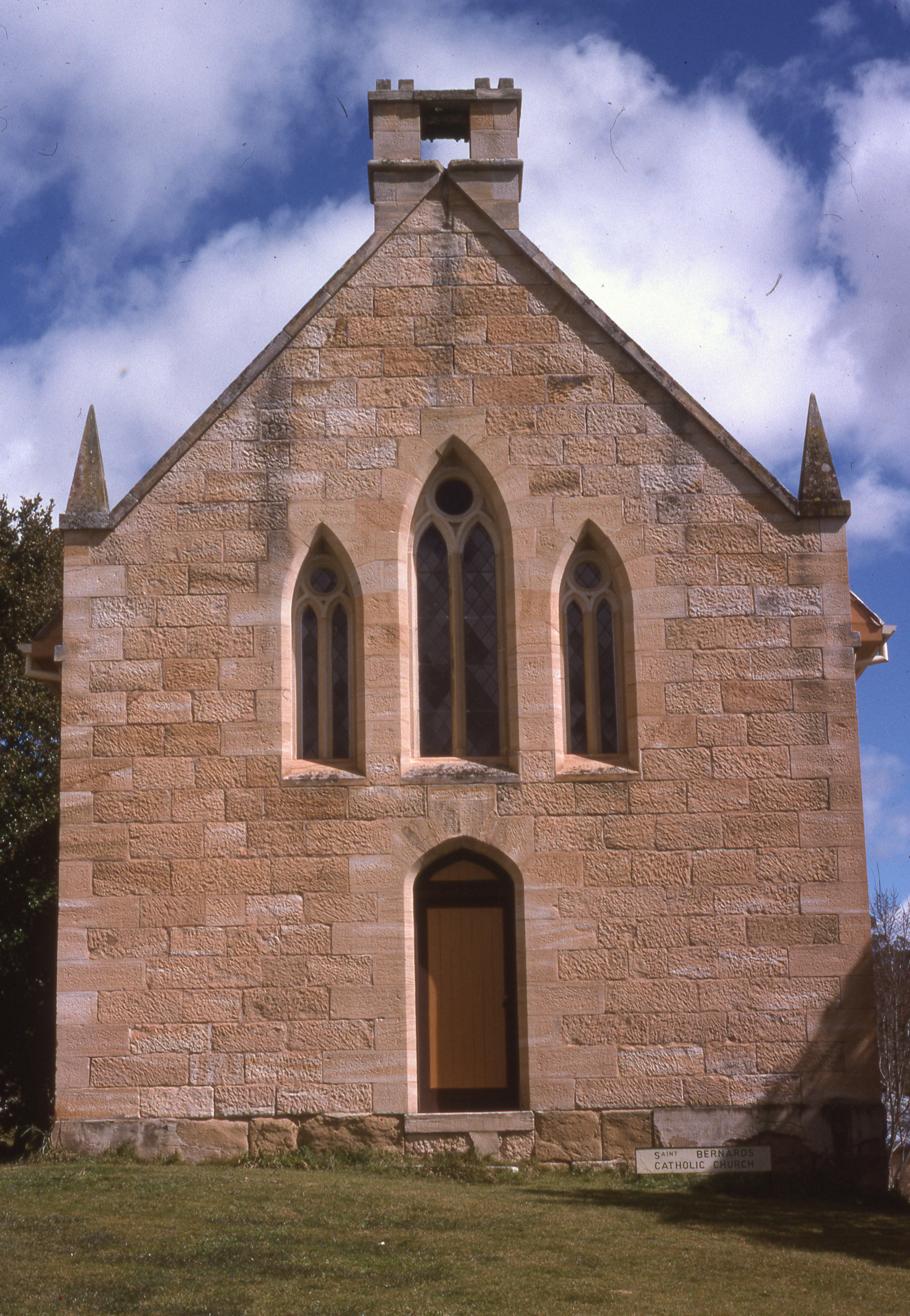
St Bernard's Catholic Church

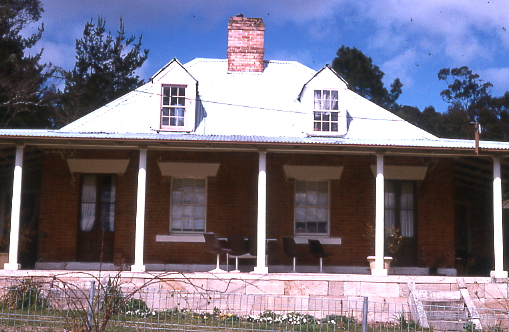
"Bungarribee" cottage at Hartley

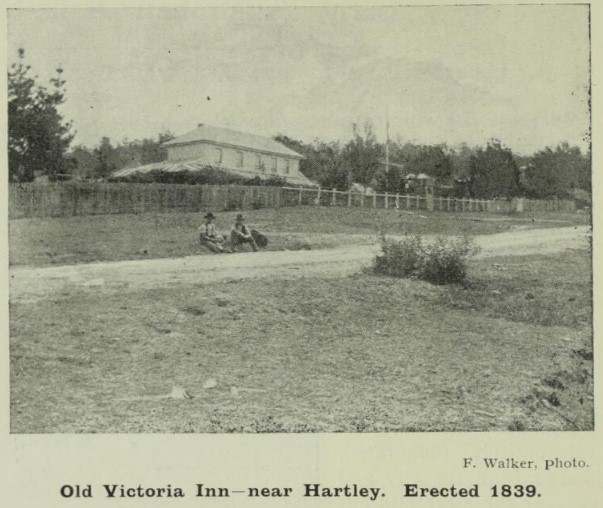
Old Victoria Inn Hartley 1839
