= The School, Mount Victoria =

Location
- Mount Victoria, New South Wales; Australia
- Coordinates: 33°35′S 150°15′E

Information
- Type: Independent boarding school
- Established: 1885
- Founder: Henry Guenther Rienits
- Status: Closed
- Closed: 1916
- Gender: Boys

The School, Mount Victoria, also known as The School, Mt Victoria, was an independent, non-denominational, boarding school for boys, located in Mount Victoria, a small township in the Blue Mountains of New South Wales, Australia. It was located approximately 120 kilometres (75 mi) via road from Sydney and 1,043 metres (3,422 ft) above sea-level.

== History ==
Opened on 18 July 1885, the school was designed and run by the proprietor and principal Henry Guenther Rienits (1851 –1928). Although Rienits was a naturalized Australian citizen, he was of German birth and so was forced by war-time legislation to close The School during 1916.

== Campus and facilities ==
The campus was situated amongst ornamental trees and gardens on eight acres. The main building contained a large schoolroom, dining hall and lavatories on the ground floor, with dormitories on the upper floor. Facilities included a swimming pool fed by springs, rifle range, tennis court and gymnasium.

== Students and studies ==
The students came from the suburbs of Sydney and from the far west of the state. The School generally provided a commercial education with an emphasis on business, bookkeeping and shorthand, leading to the junior certificate. Pupils were also prepared for university entry if required. By 1906, more than 600 boys had attended The School, and 90 students had passed different examinations leading to tertiary study. The boys wore a uniform and there was a drum and fife band.

== Notable alumni ==
- Air Vice Marshal William Bostock CB, DSO, OBE (1892 –1968), a senior commander in the Royal Australian Air Force
- Lionel Clive Ball (1877 –1955), Chief Geologist, Geological Survey of Queensland
