= Mount York =

Mountain in New South Wales, Australia

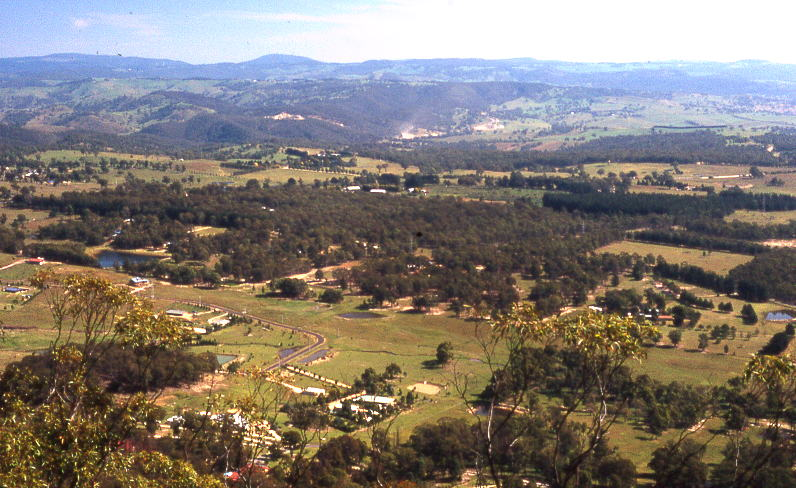
- The view from Mount York, looking west over Hartley

Highest point
- Elevation: 1,061 m (3,481 ft)
- Coordinates: 33°32′54″S 150°13′04″E

Geography
- Location within New South Wales
- Location: Blue Mountains in New South Wales, Australia
- Parent range: Explorer Range, Blue Mountains Range

Climbing
- Easiest route: Great Western Highway; Mt York Rd

Mount York, a mountain in the western region of the Explorer Range, part of the Blue Mountains Range that is a spur off the Great Dividing Range, is located approximately 150 kilometres (93 mi) west of Sydney, just outside Mount Victoria in New South Wales, Australia. Mount York has an elevation of 1,061 metres (3,481 ft) AHD and is a projection of the Blue Mountains dissected plateau, creating a promontory of the western escarpment with a minor rise at its summit.

== Description ==
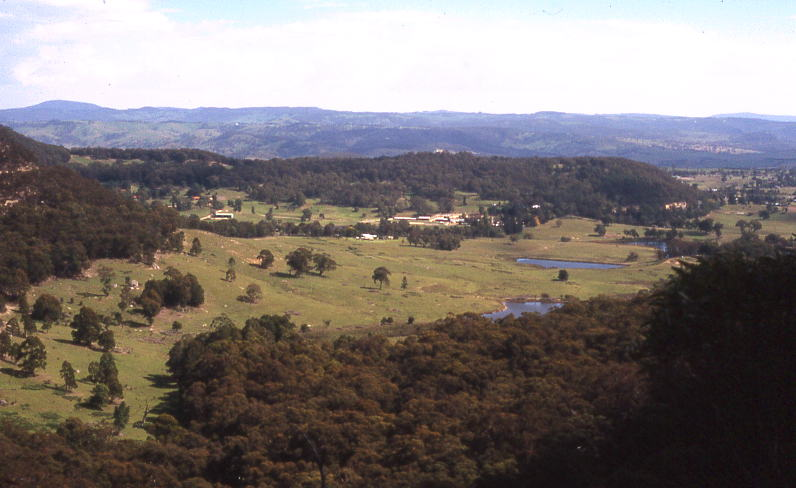
The view at the end of Berghofers Pass

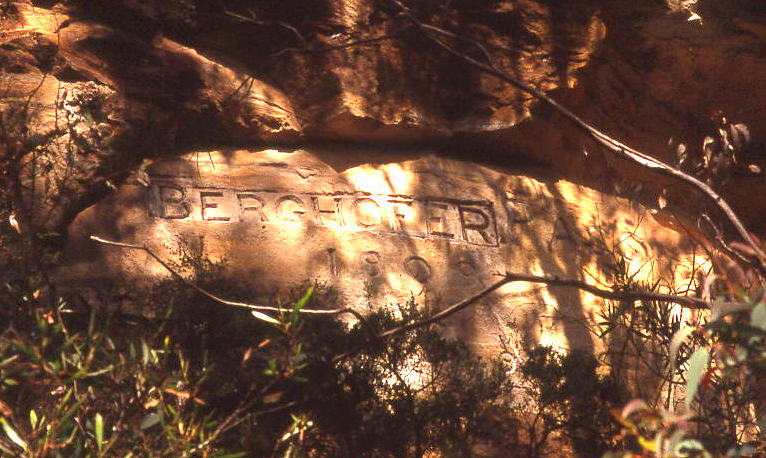
Historic inscriptions along Berghofers Pass

Mount York is mainly forested in Eucalypt growth, mostly open canopied. Several small creeks that flow into the Coxs River system run down its side. A twin promontory to its immediate east branching from the southern origin of Mount York promontory is also an extension of the western escarpment. Lockley Promontory and Mount York Promontory both jut northwest from the western escarpment, and begin at Mount Victoria, a small mountain village. Several bushwalking tracks are to be found here, including Berghofers Pass, Lockyers Road and Coxs Road. The tracks branch off from Mount York and descend into the valley below, or in the case of Berghofers, in the direction of Little Hartley, west of Mount Victoria. Atop the summit plateau near the lookouts are two wells used in early days, and remains of early settlement like walls are still visible on the tracks. Birdwatching is good here and many native species like the yellow cheeked black cockatoo and king parrot reside here. Many termite mounds can be seen along the road. The mountain is about two to three hundred metres above the Hartley Valley.

== History ==
The mountain now known as Mount York lies on the traditional lands of the Dharug people, very close to the eastern edge of traditional lands of the Wirajuri people.

Mount York was the point where Gregory Blaxland, William Lawson and William Wentworth viewed the Hartley Valley and the "west" for the first time during their successful crossing of the Blue Mountains in 1813, although some Europeans had already reached the valley before them. However, their "first crossing" and opening of the west to farming in 1813 is commemorated with several memorials atop the summit, one with their faces set in stone. There are two metal fenced lookouts, a westward facing and northward facing one.

Mount York was the site of various attempts to build a pass to the plains west of the Blue Mountains. The first was Coxs Road, constructed in 1813. The next was Lockyers Road, which was begun not long after Coxs Road, but which was never finished. Still another was Lawsons Long Alley, which was a little east of Lockyers Road. These roads were all abandoned eventually, but in recent years they have been developed into multi-use tracks by the Department of Lands in New South Wales and Blue Mts City Council. Also still visible is Berghofers Pass, which was abandoned because of later developments, and which has also been turned into a walking track. John Berghofer, who was responsible for this pass, is interred at Mount Victoria Cemetery.

== Heritage listings ==
Mount York has a number of heritage-listed sites, including:

- Blue Mountains National Park: Blue Mountains walking tracks

== See also ==
- List of mountains in Australia § New South Wales
