= Mount Victoria, New South Wales =

Mount Victoria
- Town
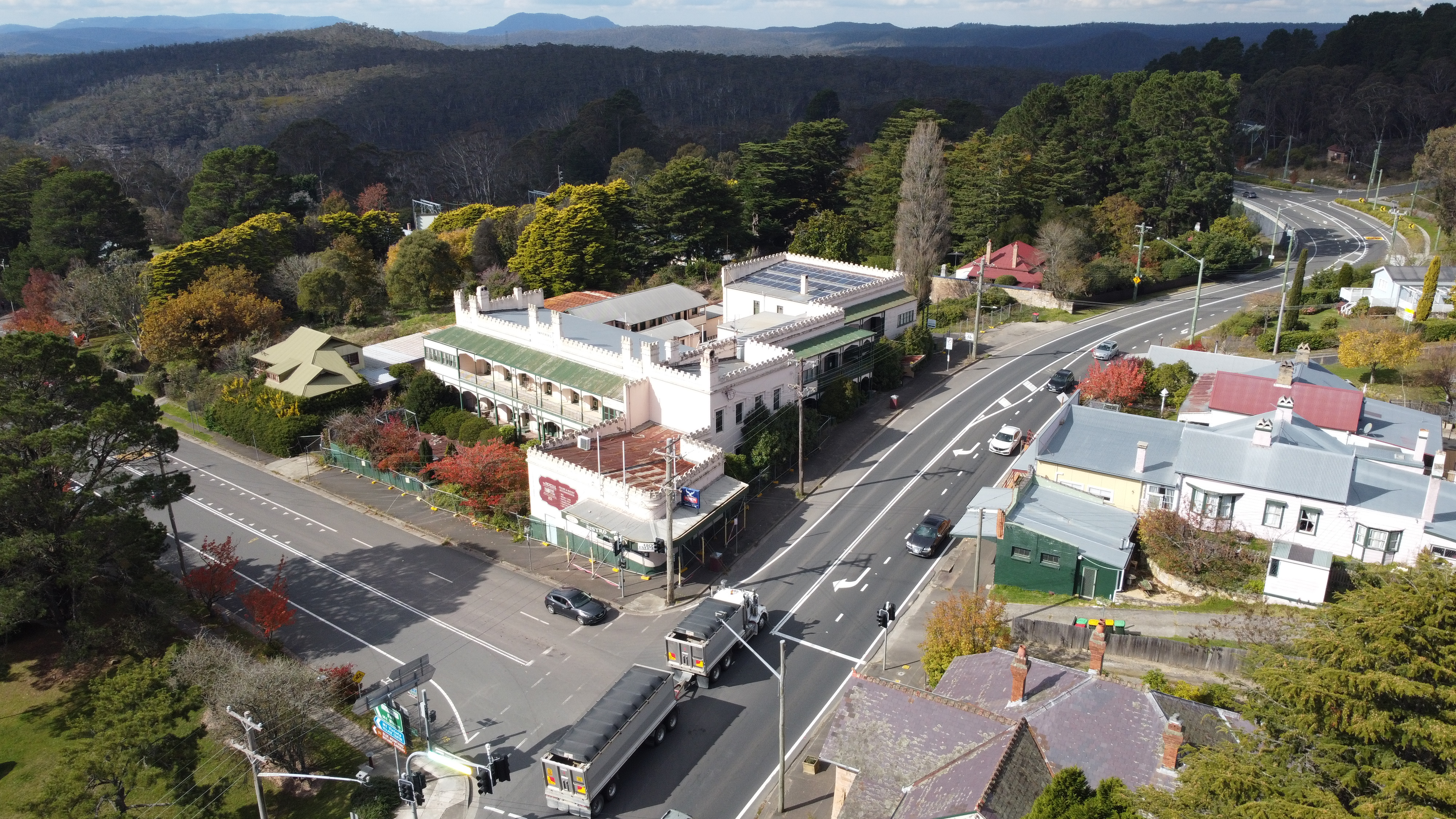
- Aerial view

- Interactive map of Mount Victoria
- Coordinates: 33°35′26″S 150°15′21″E
- Country: Australia
- State: New South Wales
- LGA: City of Blue Mountains
- Location: 120 km (75 mi) WNW of Sydney CBD; 15 km (9.3 mi) NNW of Katoomba; 26 km (16 mi) SE of Lithgow
- Established: 1866

Government
  - State electorate: Blue Mountains
  - Federal division: Macquarie
- Elevation: 1,043 m (3,422 ft)

Population
  - Total: 945 (2021 census)
- Postcode: 2786
- County: Cook
- Parish: Hartley
- Mean max temp: 16.3 °C (61.3 °F)
- Mean min temp: 7.2 °C (45.0 °F)
- Annual rainfall: 1,061.5 mm (41.79 in)
Localities around Mount Victoria
Hartley Vale	Bell	Blue Mountains National Park
Little Hartley	Mount Victoria	Mount York
Megalong Valley	Megalong Valley	Blackheath

Mount Victoria is a village in the Blue Mountains of New South Wales, Australia. Geographically, Mount Victoria is the westernmost village and suburb of Greater Sydney on the Great Western Highway in the City of Blue Mountains, located about 120 kilometres (75 mi) west-northwest by road from the Sydney central business district and at an altitude of about 1,052 metres (3,451 ft) AHD. At the 2021 Census, the settlement had a population of 945.

== History ==
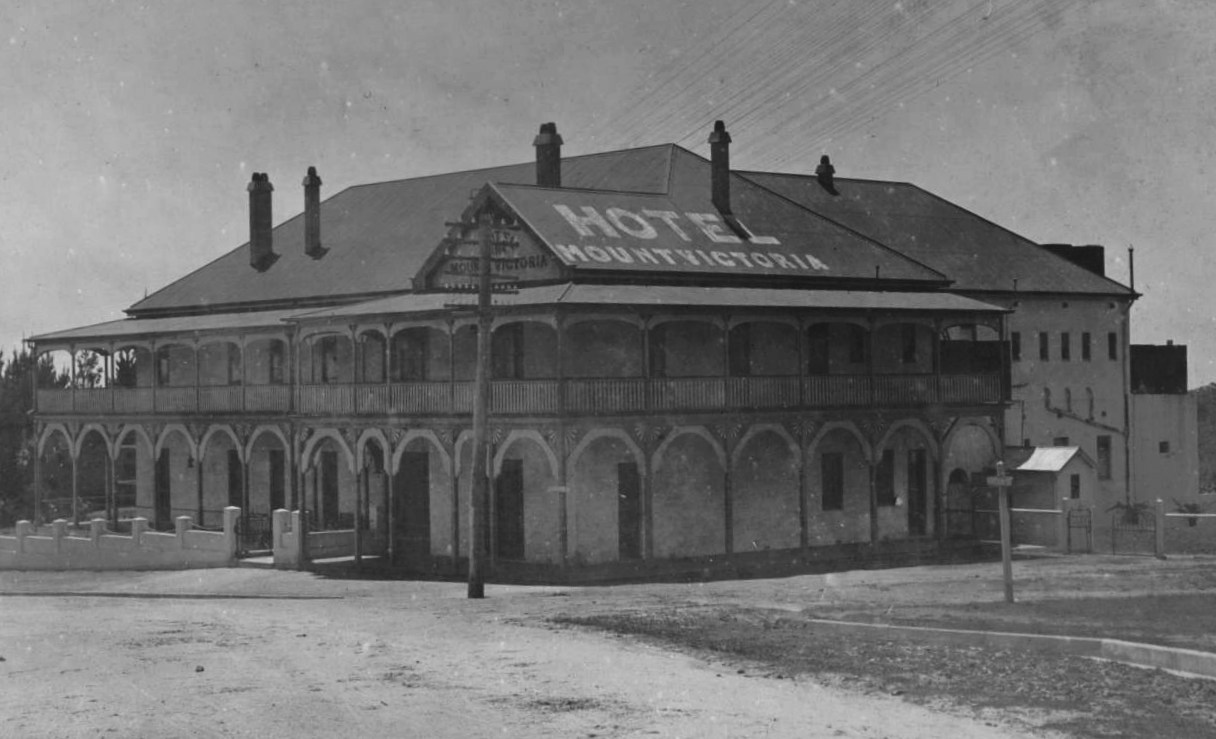
Mount Victoria Hotel in the 1920s

Mount Victoria is located on an escarpment plateau extension of Mount York, the site of a camp on the original Blaxland, Wentworth and Lawson crossing of the Blue Mountains in 1813. The area was originally marked as One Tree Hill on an early map dating from 1834 by the Surveyor General, Sir Thomas Mitchell. This is why when the township was established in 1866 it was known as One Tree Hill.

After the road across the Blue Mountains was constructed a toll bar was opened about 1 kilometre (0.62 mi) east from the present township in 1849 and the area was also known as Broughton's Waterhole Toll Bar. Coaches were charged at the toll according to how well sprung they were, ones without springs were not charged as it was believed they would help crush the road surface.

After the railway station, marking the termination of the Main Western railway line, was opened in 1868 the town also became known as Mount Victoria. The town's name was officially changed after the first Post Office was built in 1876.

By the late 19th century, the town had become a prosperous settlement and many private schools, including The School, Mount Victoria, were founded in the area, which become somewhat of a hill station retreat for wealthy Sydney families.

A well known goat, named Gary the Goat, lived on Mt. Victoria pass and was viewed as a symbol of the town before he was struck by a car and died in 2024. Transport New South Wales was reported to be in talks regarding creating a permanent memorial for him.

== Demographics ==
At the 2021 Census, the population of Mount Victoria was 945. 75.8% of people were born in Australia and 88.8% of people spoke only English at home. The most common response for religion was No Religion at 56.3%.

== Heritage listings ==
Mount Victoria has a number of heritage-listed sites, including the following sites listed on the New South Wales State Heritage Register:

- Blue Mountains National Park: Blue Mountains walking tracks
- Main Western railway: Mount Victoria railway station
- Mount York Road (off): Cox's Road and Early Deviations – Mount York, Cox's Pass Precinct

The following site are listed on other heritage registers:

- Mount Victoria Manor was built in 1876 and was the home of the Fairfax family for some years before being converted to a hotel.
- Imperial Hotel: The Imperial Hotel was constructed in 1878 and was significant for being the only hotel in the Blue Mountains to trade continuously under its own name. The hotel closed in 2016 pending renovations. As of 2025 it remains closed.
- St Peter's Anglican Church: Designed by architect David Macbeath and built of sandstone in 1874–1875 by contractor Alexander Armstrong, this is the oldest Christian Church in the Blue Mountains.
- Toll House: Constructed in 1849 the Toll House is one of only two surviving toll houses in New South Wales, the second oldest building in the Blue Mountains and one of only two surviving pre 1850s cottages in the Blue Mountains.
- Mount Victoria Post Office: A federation style building constructed in 1896–1897.
- Gatekeeper's Cottage: Constructed in 1868 this is one of only six remaining of twelve original gatekeeper's cottages in the Blue Mountains.
- Mount Victoria Public School: Completed in 1877 it is possibly the oldest public school in the Blue Mountains.

=== Asgard Swamp coal mine ===
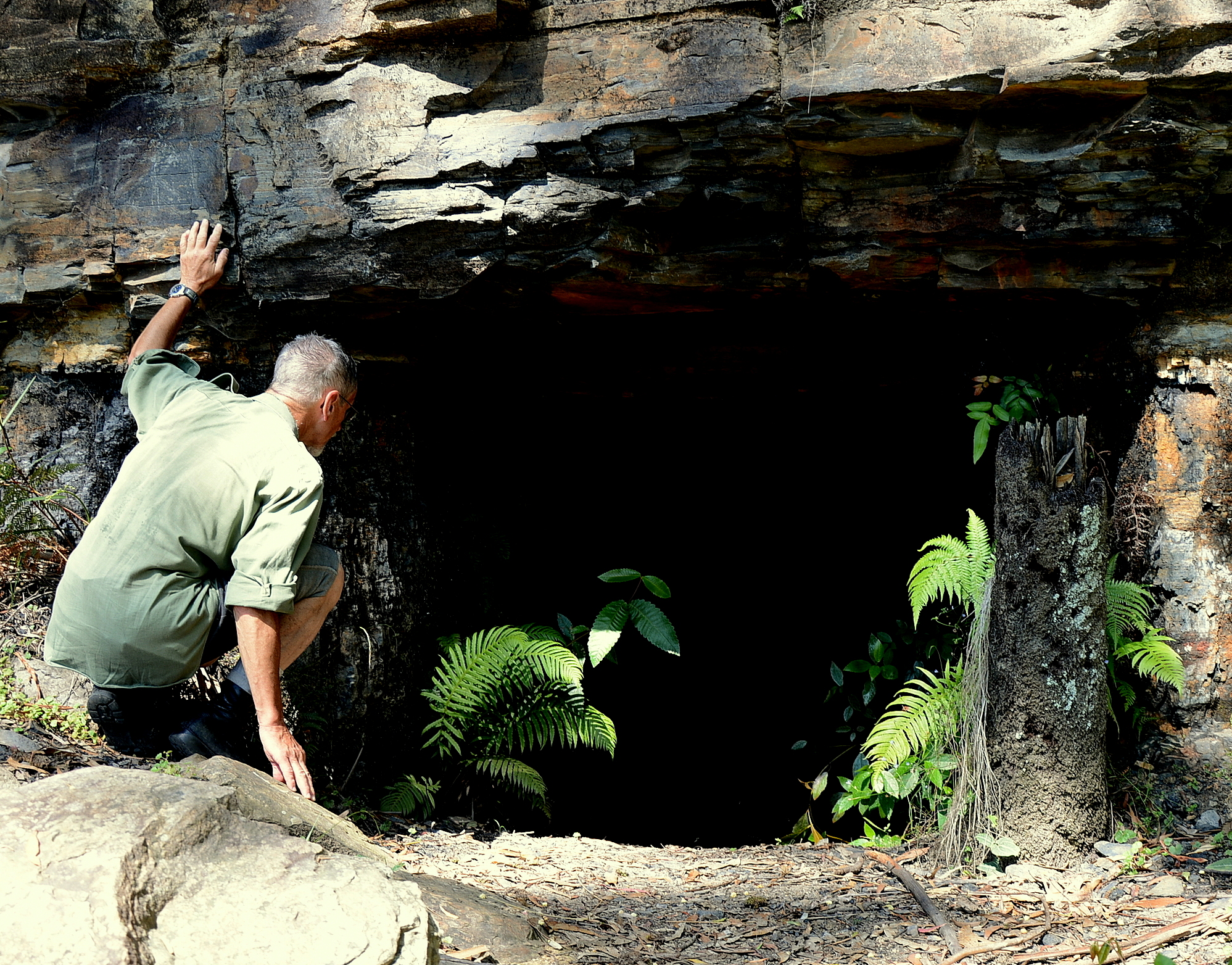
Asgard Swamp Coal Mine

To the north-east of Mount Victoria lies the Asgard Swamp area, now part of the Blue Mountains National Park. The area is the site of a coal mine that was developed in the nineteenth century, but which was ultimately unsuccessful. Six adits were driven into the coal seam by Walter Mackenzie and Thomas Garret, circa 1881. A coke oven was built and it was also proposed to build a tramline from Mount Victoria, but it is not known if this ever happened. The leases changed hands a few times over the years, but no work was done after 1908. Around the south and east edges of Asgard Swamp, there are the remains of huts used by the people who worked the mines.

=== Mount Victoria cemetery ===
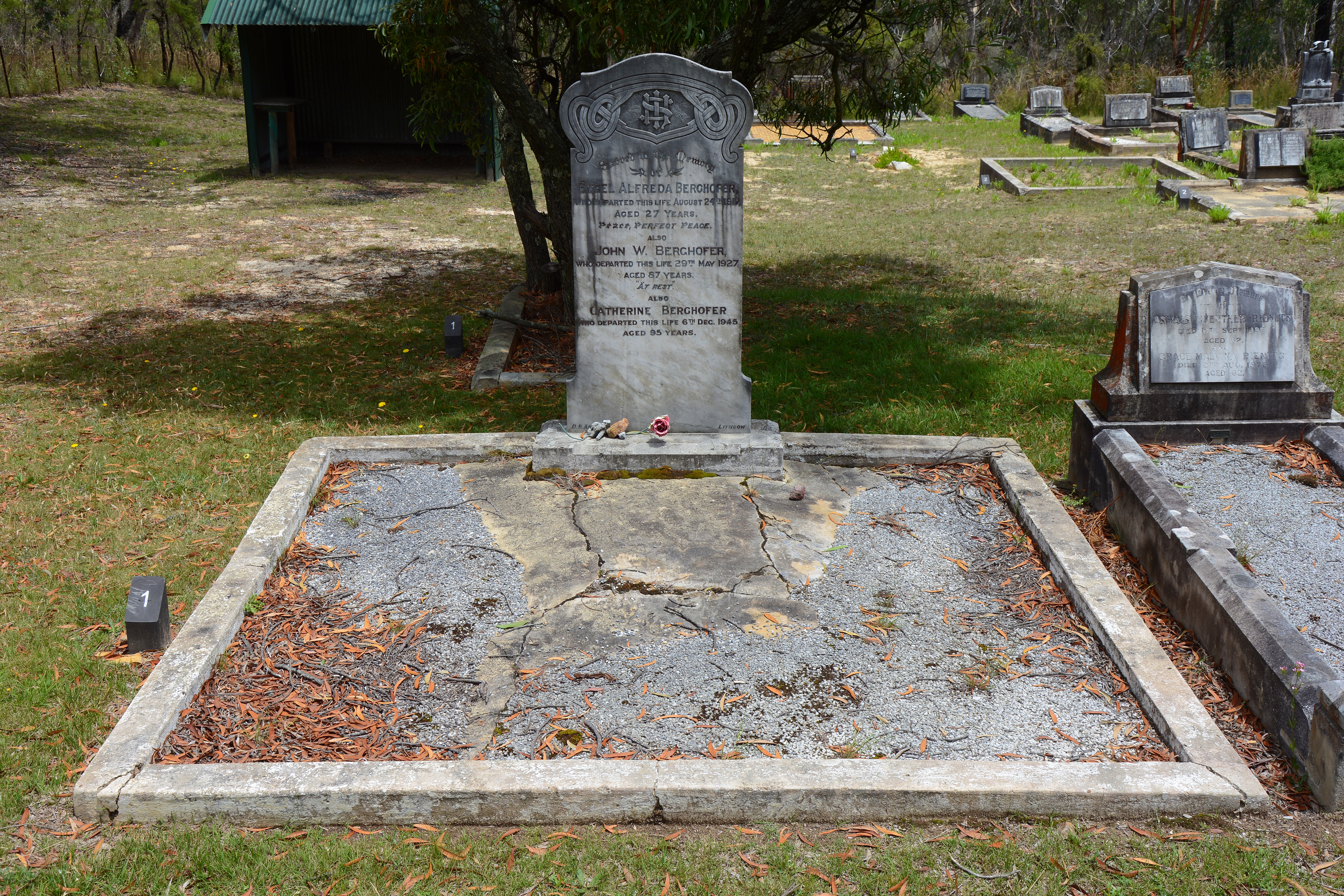
Berghofer grave at Mount Victoria Cemetery

Mount Victoria Cemetery, located one and a half kilometres south-east of the township, was established in 1881. Notable internees include John Berghofer, the builder of Berghofer's Pass at Mount York. (The pass, no longer used for vehicular traffic, has since been included in a network of walking tracks at Mount York. The Mount York area is now heritage-listed.)

Other internees include members of the Lanfranchi family, owners of Marthaville, a heritage-listed house on the Great Western Highway.

=== Imperial Hotel ===
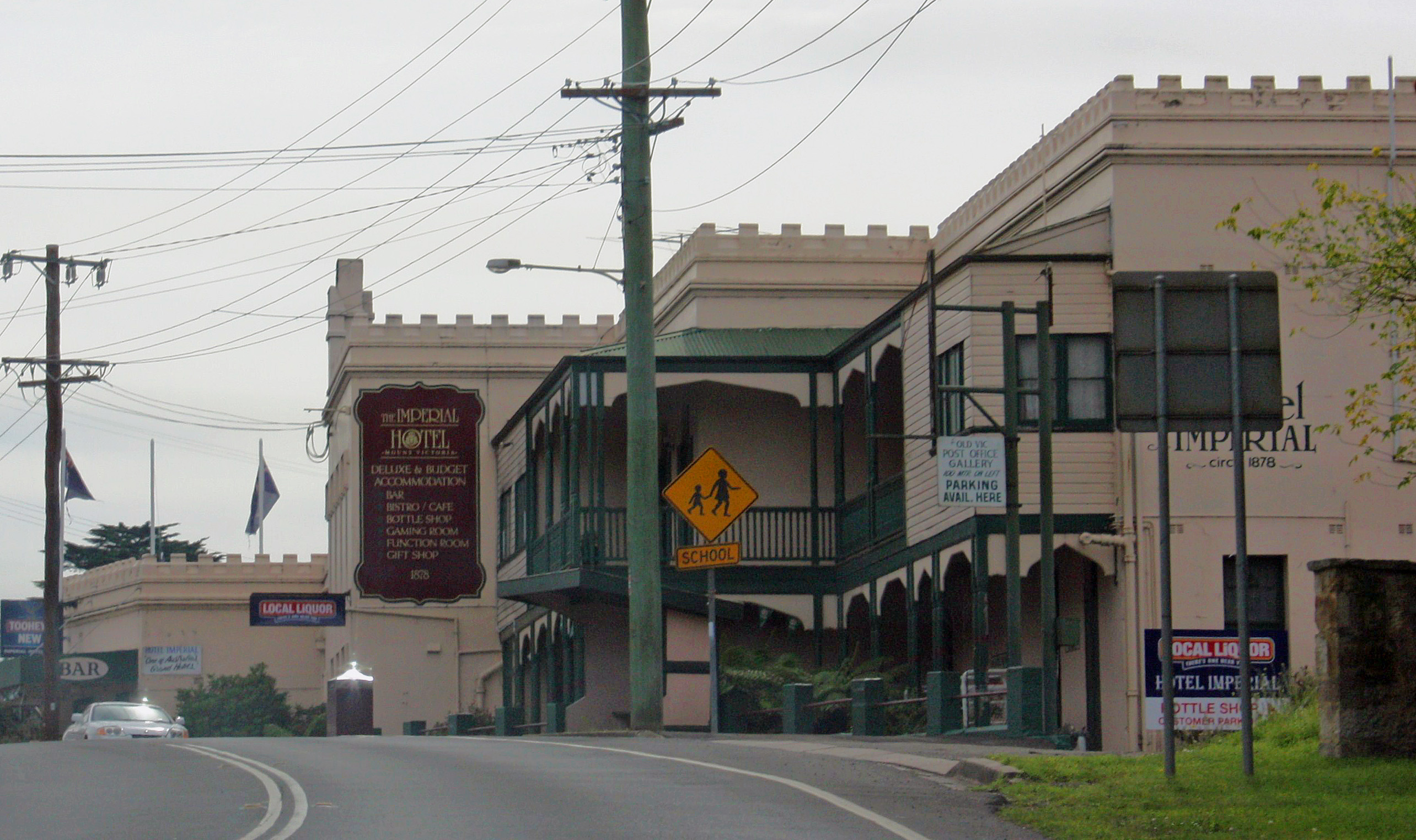
The Imperial Hotel in 2011

The Imperial Hotel was constructed in 1878 and was significant for being the only hotel in the Blue Mountains to trade continuously under its own name. The hotel closed in 2016 pending renovations. It was sold in 2017, listed again for sale in 2024 and then again in 2025. Despite plans for reopening it has remained closed during that time and repeatedly been broken into and vandalised.

== Present day ==
Today, Mount Victoria is a small township with a large number of historic buildings and a few attractions including the Post Office, a Hall which is used as a cinema, the Imperial Hotel, the Toll Keepers Cottage and a museum at the railway station.

The town is the starting point for many bushwalks and features several lookouts over the Kanimbla Valley including the lookout from Mount Piddington.

The railway station, along with Lithgow, is the terminus for the Blue Mountains Line. The town is located at the junction of the Great Western Highway and the Darling Causeway to Bell. Transport for NSW is researching a major upgrade to the Great Western Highway with the view to bypass the township and the steep Victoria Pass down to Little Hartley to the west.

== Climate ==
Due to its high elevation within the Blue Mountains, Mount Victoria experiences a subtropical highland climate (Köppen: Cfb). The town has very mild summers, cool winters and precipitation year-round.

Climate data for Mount Victoria (33.59°S 150.25°E, 1,064 m (3,491 ft) m AMSL) (1872-1990 data)
Month	Jan	Feb	Mar	Apr	May	Jun	Jul	Aug	Sep	Oct	Nov	Dec	Year
Record high °C (°F)	35.5 (95.9)	36.0 (96.8)	31.7 (89.1)	24.7 (76.5)	21.9 (71.4)	16.7 (62.1)	17.2 (63.0)	20.0 (68.0)	26.0 (78.8)	29.0 (84.2)	34.4 (93.9)	34.0 (93.2)	36.0 (96.8)
Mean daily maximum °C (°F)	23.0 (73.4)	22.2 (72.0)	20.2 (68.4)	16.2 (61.2)	12.4 (54.3)	9.3 (48.7)	8.8 (47.8)	10.5 (50.9)	14.0 (57.2)	17.1 (62.8)	19.9 (67.8)	22.4 (72.3)	16.3 (61.3)
Mean daily minimum °C (°F)	12.0 (53.6)	12.2 (54.0)	10.8 (51.4)	7.8 (46.0)	5.1 (41.2)	2.9 (37.2)	1.7 (35.1)	2.5 (36.5)	4.4 (39.9)	6.8 (44.2)	8.9 (48.0)	10.9 (51.6)	7.2 (45.0)
Record low °C (°F)	4.7 (40.5)	4.4 (39.9)	2.2 (36.0)	0.0 (32.0)	−2.2 (28.0)	−3.0 (26.6)	−6.3 (20.7)	−4.0 (24.8)	−2.8 (27.0)	−1.7 (28.9)	−0.5 (31.1)	2.2 (36.0)	−6.3 (20.7)
Average precipitation mm (inches)	117.1 (4.61)	121.0 (4.76)	110.3 (4.34)	90.0 (3.54)	79.4 (3.13)	90.9 (3.58)	72.0 (2.83)	66.8 (2.63)	62.1 (2.44)	77.7 (3.06)	81.7 (3.22)	91.9 (3.62)	1,061.5 (41.79)
Average precipitation days (≥ 0.2 mm)	12.5	12.7	12.5	10.8	10.1	11.1	10.5	10.1	9.7	10.9	10.8	11.4	133.1
Average afternoon relative humidity (%)	53	60	62	63	68	72	65	61	56	57	53	52	60
Source: Bureau of Meteorology (1872-1990 data)

== Transport ==
Blue Mountains Transit operates one bus route through the suburb of Mount Victoria:

- 698V: Katoomba to Mount Victoria

Mount Victoria has a Railway Station.

== Education ==
Mount Victoria has a Public School with 58 students. In 2025 the Australian Education Awards shortlisted the school among 6 other schools in the category of "Primary School of the Year - Government Sector". Putting it as one of the top 7 Government Primary Schools in Australia. The school opened in 1877 and is possibly the oldest public school in the Blue Mountains.
