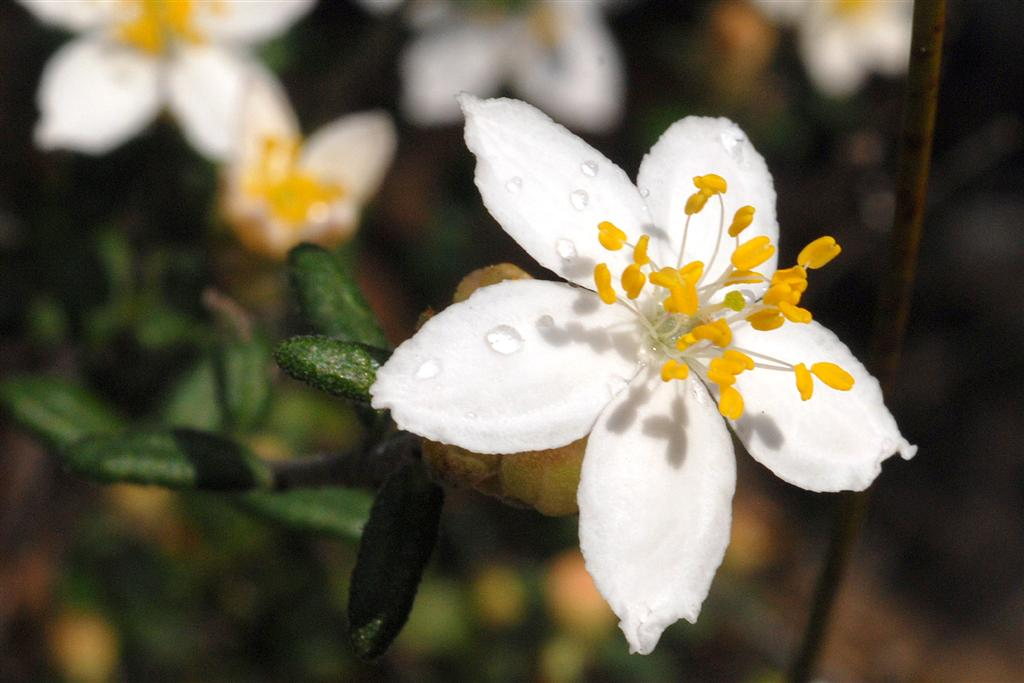

Scientific classification
- Kingdom: Plantae
- Clade: Tracheophytes
- Clade: Angiosperms
- Clade: Eudicots
- Clade: Rosids
- Order: Sapindales
- Family: Rutaceae
- Genus: Asterolasia
- Species: A. nivea

Binomial name
- Asterolasia nivea (Paul G.Wilson) Paul G.Wilson

Synonyms
- Urocarpus niveus Paul G.Wilson

= Asterolasia nivea =

Bindoon starbush

Species of flowering plant

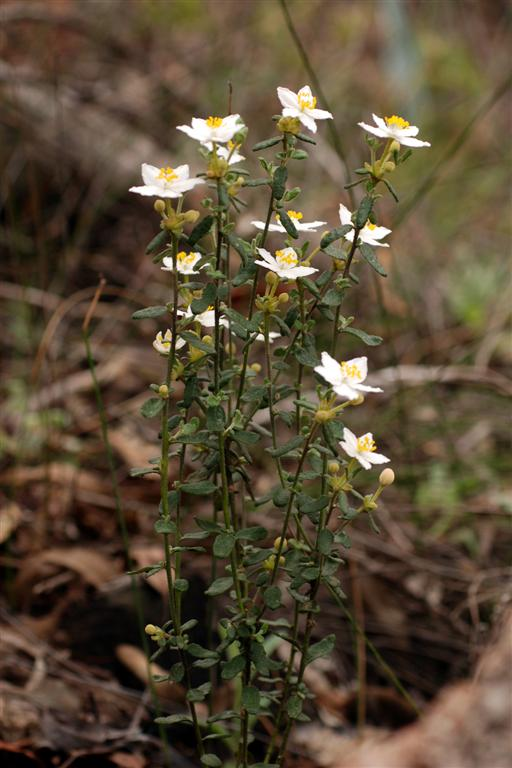
Habit

Asterolasia nivea, commonly known as Bindoon starbush, is a species of weak sub-shrub that is endemic to the southwest of Western Australia. It has leathery oblong to narrow elliptical leaves and white flowers arranged in groups of about three flowers with thick-centred, shield like, star-shaped hairs on the back of the petals.

== Description ==
Asterolasia nivea is a weak sub-shrub that typically grows to a height of about 50 cm (20 in). The leaves are narrow oblong, to elliptical, about 12 mm (0.47 in) long on a short petiole. The leaves are covered with star-shaped hairs. The flowers are arranged in groups of about three in leaf axils and on the ends of branchlets, each flower on a pedicel up to 15 mm (0.59 in) long and covered with thick-centred, star-shaped hairs. The petals are white, elliptical, 8–10 mm (0.31–0.39 in) long with thick-centred, star-shaped hairs on the back that formed a shield over the flower bud. There are between fifteen and twenty stamens.

== Taxonomy ==
This species was first formally described in 1980 by Paul Wilson who gave it the name Urocarpus niveus and published the description in the journal Nuytsia. In 1987, Wilson changed the name to Asterolasia nivea, publishing the change in the journal Nuytsia.

In 2017, Juliet A. Wege published a paper in Nuytsia suggesting that A. nivea is a white flowered form, and that the name A. nivea is a synonym of A. grandiflora. This change has been accepted by the Western Australian Herbarium but not as yet by the Australian Plant Census.

== Distribution and habitat ==
Asterolasia nivea grows in gravel between New Norcia and Bindoon in Western Australia.
