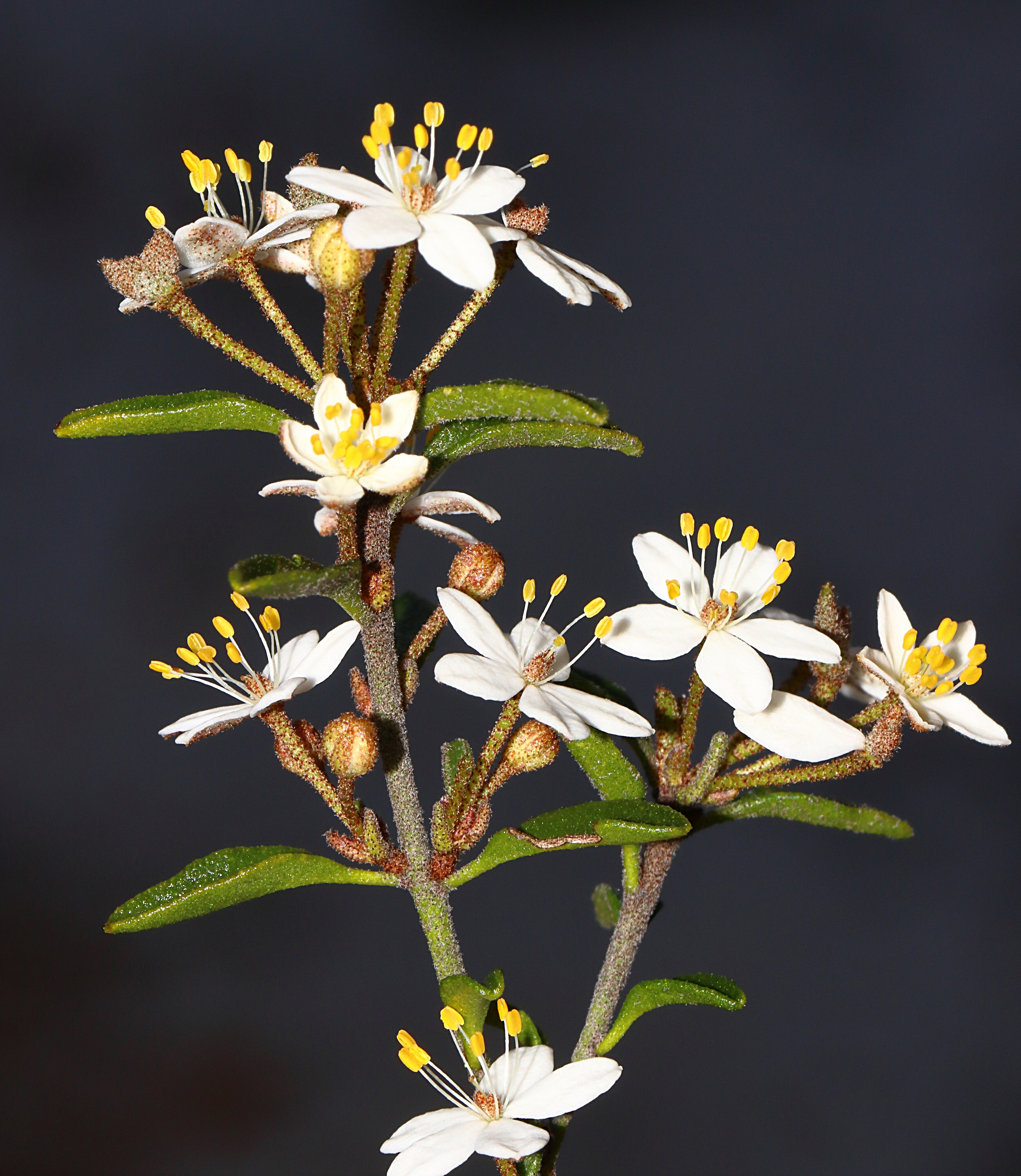
- Near Dandaragan

Conservation status
- Priority Four — Rare Taxa (DEC)

Scientific classification
- Kingdom: Plantae
- Clade: Tracheophytes
- Clade: Angiosperms
- Clade: Eudicots
- Clade: Rosids
- Order: Sapindales
- Family: Rutaceae
- Genus: Asterolasia
- Species: A. drummondii

Binomial name
- Asterolasia drummondii Paul G.Wilson

Synonyms
- Asterolasia drummondii Blackall & Grieve nom. inval., nom. nud.; Asterolasia phebalioides (J.Drumm. ex Harv.) Benth. nom. illeg.; Eriostemon drummondi F.Muell. orth. var.; Eriostemon drummondii F.Muell. nom. illeg.; Urocarpus phebalioides J.Drumm. ex Harv.

= Asterolasia drummondii =

Gairdner Range starbush

Species of flowering plant

Asterolasia drummondii, commonly known as Gairdner Range starbush, is a species of small shrub that is endemic to a restricted area of the southwest of Western Australia. It has egg-shaped leaves and white flowers arranged in umbels of five to ten flowers with rust-coloured, star-shaped hairs on the back of the petals.

== Description ==
Asterolasia drummondii is woody perennial shrub that typically grows to a height of 20–50 cm (7.9–19.7 in). The leaves are leathery, egg-shaped, 10–20 mm (0.39–0.79 in) long and glabrous. The flowers are arranged in umbels of five to ten, mainly on the ends of branchlets, each flower on a pedicel 10–20 mm (0.39–0.79 in) long and covered with rust-coloured, star-shaped hairs. The petals are white, broadly elliptical, about 6 mm (0.24 in) long, with rust-coloured, star-shaped hairs on the back, and there are ten stamens.

== Taxonomy ==
The species was first formally described in 1855 by William Henry Harvey after an unpublished description by James Drummond. It was given the name Urocarpus phebalioides and the description was published in Hooker's Journal of Botany and Kew Garden Miscellany from specimens collected on the east side of Mount Lesueur.

In 1987, Paul Wilson transferred the species to the genus Asterolasia, but as there was already a species named Asterolasia phebalioides, Wilson changed the name to Asterolasia drummondii, publishing the change in the journal Nuytsia.

== Distribution and habitat ==
Gairdner Range starbush grows in laterite soil on hills, sandplains and breakaways in the Mount Lesueur area.

== Conservation status ==
Asterolasia drummondii is classified as "Priority Four" by the Government of Western Australia Department of Parks and Wildlife, meaning that is rare or near threatened.
