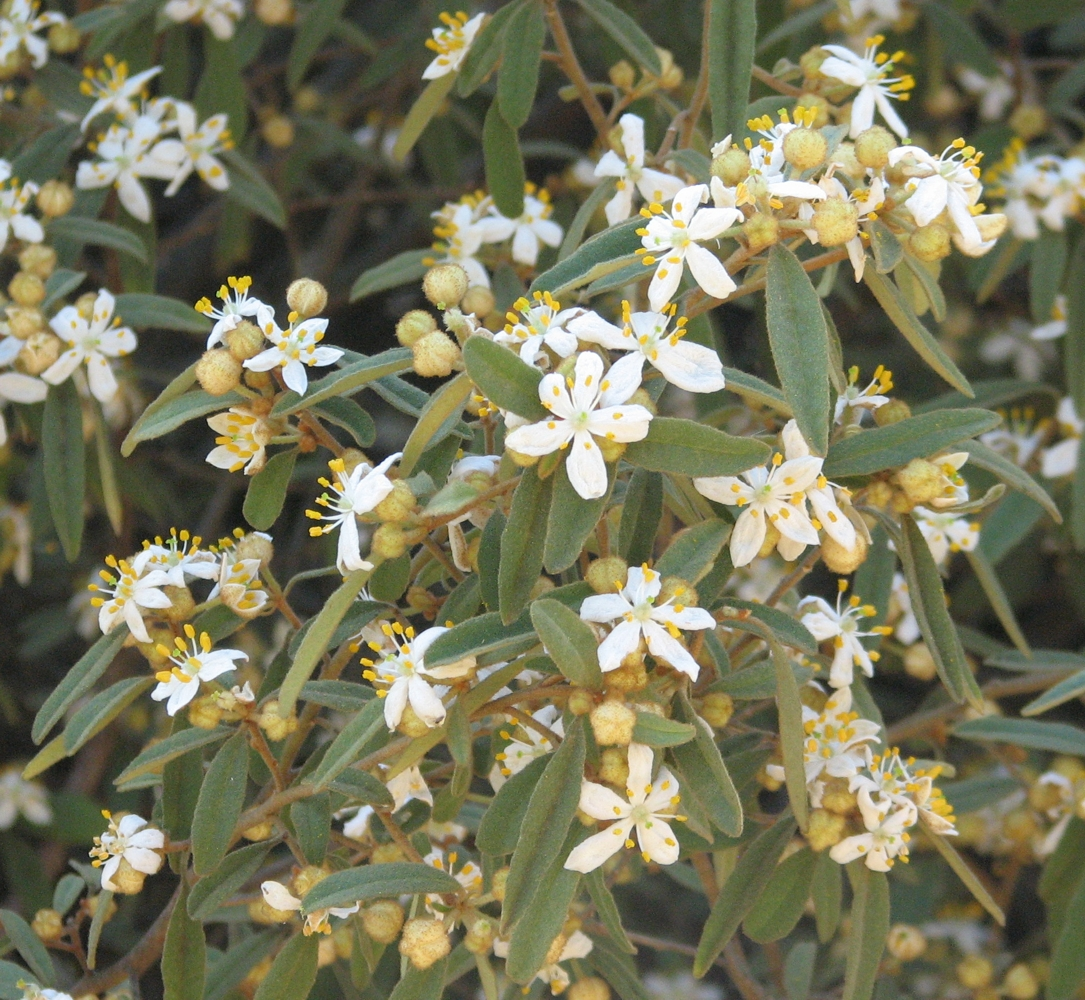
- In Maranoa Gardens

Scientific classification
- Kingdom: Plantae
- Clade: Embryophytes
- Clade: Tracheophytes
- Clade: Angiosperms
- Clade: Eudicots
- Clade: Rosids
- Order: Sapindales
- Family: Rutaceae
- Genus: Asterolasia
- Species: A. hexapetala

Binomial name
- Asterolasia hexapetala (Juss.) Druce

Synonyms
- Asterolasia correifolia var. mollis Maiden & Betche; Asterolasia mollis Benth. nom. illeg., nom. superfl.; Eriostemon mollis F.Muell. nom. illeg.; Phebalium hexapetalum A.Juss.

= Asterolasia hexapetala =

Species of flowering plant

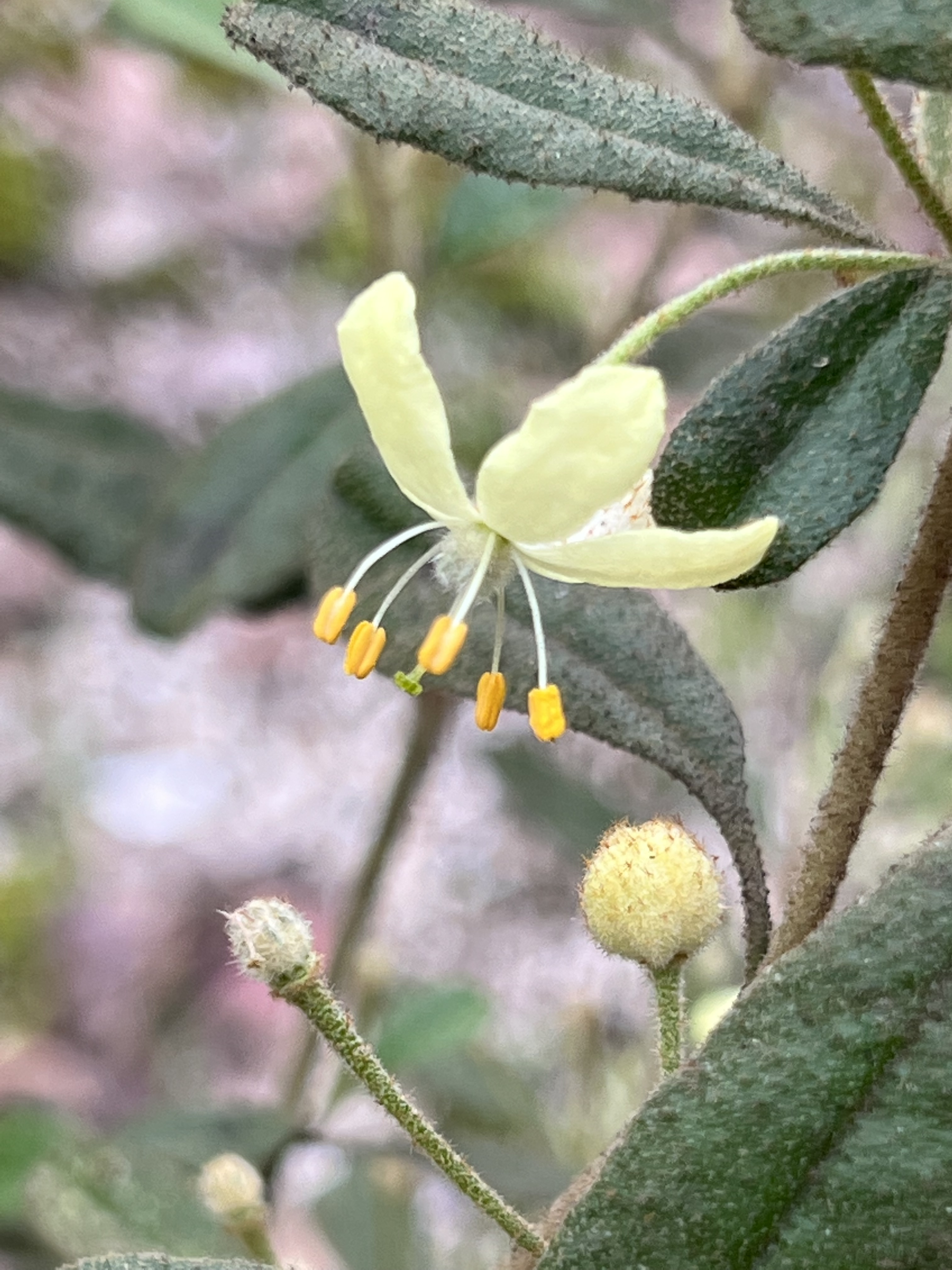
Yellow form

Asterolasia hexapetala is a species of erect, spreading shrub that is endemic to the Warrumbungles in New South Wales. It has oblong to elliptical leaves with star-shaped hairs, especially on the lower surface, and white flowers arranged in small groups in leaf axils and on the ends of branchlets, the back of the petals densely covered with white, yellow or brown, woolly star-shaped hairs.

== Description ==
Asterolasia hexapetala is an erect, spreading shrub that typically grows to a height of 3 m (9.8 ft). The leaves are oblong to elliptical, 30–60 mm (1.2–2.4 in) long and 5–15 mm (0.20–0.59 in) wide on a petiole 5–15 mm (0.20–0.59 in) long. The leaves are covered with white to brownish, woolly, star-shaped hairs, usually paler and more densely covered on the lower surface. The flowers are arranged in small umbels in leaf axils and on the ends of branchlets, each flower on a pedicel 5–20 mm (0.20–0.79 in) long. The five petals are white to yellow, mostly 7–9 mm (0.28–0.35 in) long, densely covered with white to yellow or brown, woolly, star-shaped hairs on the back. Flowering occurs in spring.

== Taxonomy ==
This species was first formally described in 1825 by French botanist Antoine Laurent de Jussieu, who gave it the name Phebalium hexapetalum. In 1917, George Claridge Druce changed the name to Asterolasia hexapetala. The name originates from the Ancient Greek words; aster, lasios, and hexapetala, meaning star, hairy (referring to hairs on the leaves), and six-petals.

== Distribution and habitat ==
This asterolasia is only found in the Warrumbungle Ranges where it mainly grows along watercourses in forest and woodland.

== Use in horticulture ==
Asterolasoa hexapetala prefers a moist, well drained and lightly shaded situation. Established plants are able to cope with dry periods. Plants may be propagated by cuttings or from seed, with some difficulty.
