= Asterolasia muricata =

Lemon star-bush

Scientific classification
- Kingdom: Plantae
- Clade: Tracheophytes
- Clade: Angiosperms
- Clade: Eudicots
- Clade: Rosids
- Order: Sapindales
- Family: Rutaceae
- Genus: Asterolasia
- Species: A. muricata

Binomial name
- Asterolasia muricata J.M.Black

Synonyms
- Urocarpus muricatus Paul G.Wilson

Species of flowering plant

Asterolasia muricata, commonly known as lemon star-bush, is a species of small, slender, erect shrub that is endemic to South Australia. It has leathery leaves covered with rough points and with the edges rolled under, and yellow flowers arranged singly or in groups of up to three, with woolly star-shaped hairs on the back of the petals.

== Description ==
Asterolasia muricata is a slender, erect shrub that typically grows to a height of about 1 m (3 ft 3 in). It has leathery leaves 7–15 mm (0.28–0.59 in) long on a short petiole with the edges rolled under. The upper surface of the leaves is covered with rough points but the lower surface is covered with woolly, star-shaped hairs. The flowers are sessile, arranged singly or in groups of two or three in leaf axils and on the ends of branchlets, each flower on a pedicel up to 0.5–8 mm (0.020–0.315 in) long. The petals are yellow, broadly elliptical, about 5 mm (0.20 in) long and covered with woolly, star-shaped hairs on the back. There are ten stamens

== Taxonomy ==
Asterolasia muricata was first described in 1912 by John McConnell Black who published the description in Transactions and Proceedings of the Royal Society of South Australia.

== Distribution and habitat ==
Asterolasia muricata grows in sandy heath and is found on Kangaroo Island and on the southern tip of the Fleurieu Peninsula in South Australia.
