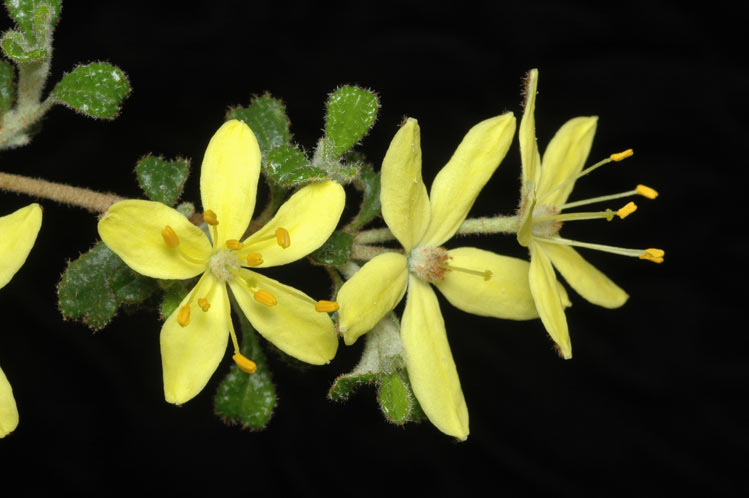
- In the ANBG

Scientific classification
- Kingdom: Plantae
- Clade: Tracheophytes
- Clade: Angiosperms
- Clade: Eudicots
- Clade: Rosids
- Order: Sapindales
- Family: Rutaceae
- Genus: Asterolasia
- Species: A. buckinghamii

Binomial name
- Asterolasia buckinghamii (Blakely) Blakely

Synonyms
- Phebalium buckinghamii Blakely

= Asterolasia buckinghamii =

Species of flowering plant

Asterolasia buckinghamii is a species of slender, erect shrub in the family Rutaceae and is endemic to eastern New South Wales. It has star-shaped hairs on its young branches, broadly egg-shaped, hairy leaves and yellow flowers with rust-coloured, star-shaped hairs on the back of the petals.

== Description ==
Asterolasia buckinghamii is a slender, erect shrub that typically grows to a height of 1.5–2 m (4 ft 11 in – 6 ft 7 in) with its young branches covered with star-shaped hairs. The leaves are spatula-shaped to broadly egg-shaped with the narrower end towards the base, 4–15 mm (0.16–0.59 in) long and 3–7 mm (0.12–0.28 in) wide on a petiole 2–4 mm (0.079–0.157 in) long. The leaves are covered with star-shaped hairs, densely so on the lower surface and the upper surface has a longitudinal groove. The flowers are arranged singly or in groups of two or three in leaf axils or on the ends of branchlets, each flower on a pedicel up to 2 mm (0.079 in) long. The five petals are yellow, elliptical, 4–8 mm (0.16–0.31 in) long and covered with star-shaped, rust-coloured hairs on the back and there are ten stamens. Flowering occurs from October to November.

== Taxonomy ==
This species was first described in 1940 by William Blakely who gave it the name Phebalium buckinghamii and published the description in The Australian Naturalist. The following year, Blakely changed the name to Asterolasia buckinghamii. The specific epithet (buckinghamii) honours "Mr. William J. Buckingham of Lindfield, New South Wales".

== Distribution and habitat ==
Asterolasia buckinghamii grows in gullies and on river flats or on slopes near cliff tops. It occurs in the Wingello district and between Mittagong and Lithgow in New South Wales.
