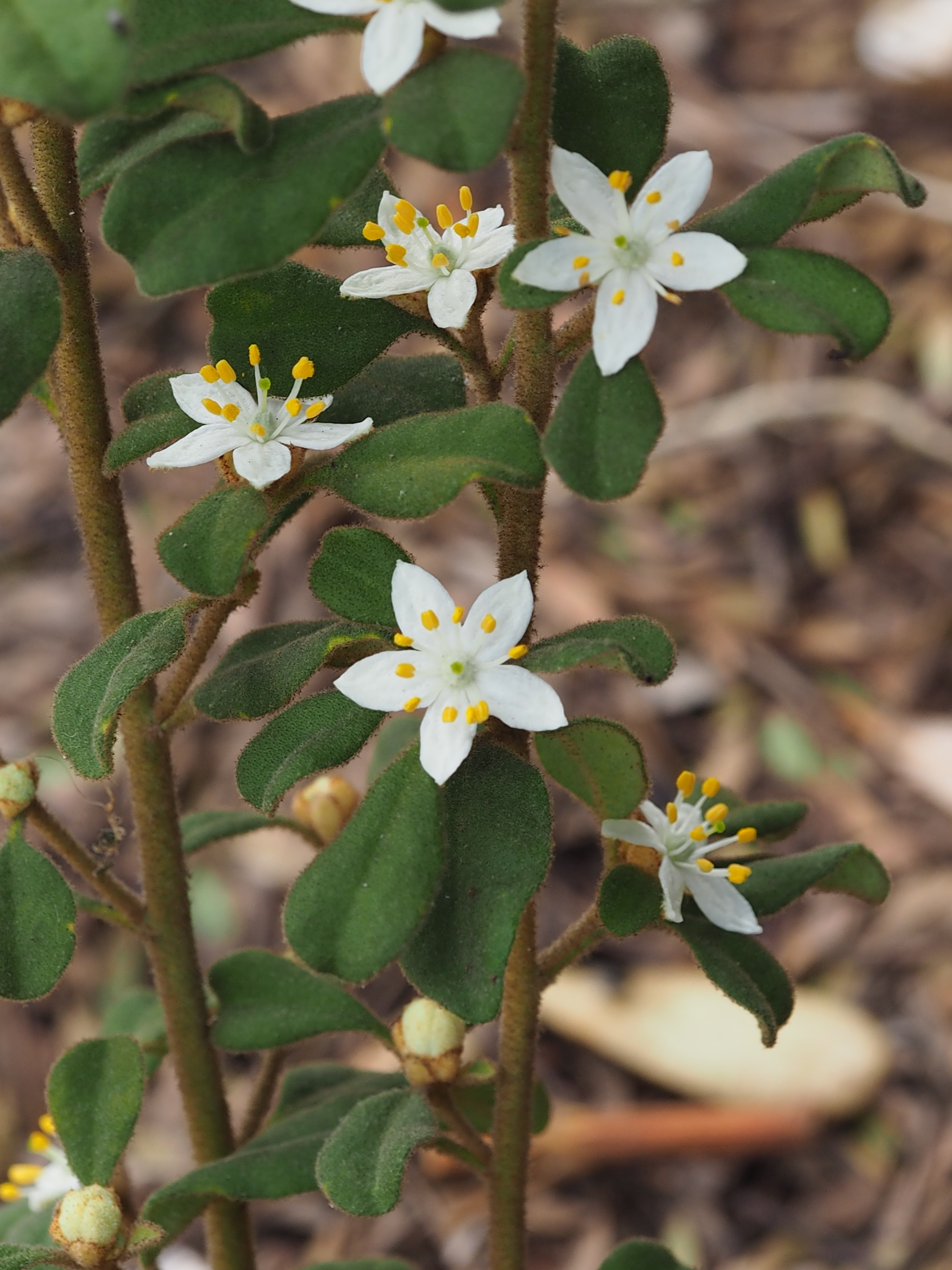
- Asterolasia beckersii

Conservation status
- Critically endangered (EPBC Act)

Scientific classification
- Kingdom: Plantae
- Clade: Tracheophytes
- Clade: Angiosperms
- Clade: Eudicots
- Clade: Rosids
- Order: Sapindales
- Family: Rutaceae
- Genus: Asterolasia
- Species: A. beckersii

Binomial name
- Asterolasia beckersii Orme & Duretto

Synonyms
- Asterolasia sp. 'Dungowan Creek'

= Asterolasia beckersii =

Dungowan starbush

Species of flowering plant

Asterolasia beckersii, commonly known as Dungowan starbush, is a species of erect shrub in the family Rutaceae and is endemic to a restricted area of New South Wales. It has woolly, star-shaped hairs on its branchlets, egg-shaped to lance-shaped leaves with the narrower end towards the base and covered with star-shaped hairs, and white flowers arranged singly in leaf axils, the back of the petals covered with star-like hairs.

== Description ==
Asterolasia beckersii is an erect shrub that typically grows to a height of 1.5–3.5 m (4 ft 11 in – 11 ft 6 in) with its branchlets covered with woolly, fawnish star-shaped hairs. The leaves are egg-shaped to lance-shaped with the narrower end towards the base, 15–40 mm (0.59–1.57 in) long and 5–12 mm (0.20–0.47 in) wide on a petiole about 5 mm (0.20 in) long. The upper surface of the leaves is sparsely hairy and the lower surface covered with greenish to fawnish, woolly, star-shaped hairs. The flowers are arranged singly in leaf axils on a pedicel 2–7 mm (0.079–0.276 in) long. The petals are white, about 6 mm (0.24 in) long and covered on the back with woolly, white star-shaped hairs. Flowering has been observed in October.

== Taxonomy ==
Asterolasia beckersii was first formally described in 2017 by Andrew Orme and Marco Duretto in the journal Telopea from specimens collected near Dungowan Dam near Tamworth in 2003. The specific epithet (beckersii) honours Doug Beckers for discovering the species.

== Distribution and habitat ==
Dungowan starbush is only known from the type location where in grows in rocky soil along a creekbank.

== Conservation status ==
This plant is listed as "endangered" under the New South Wales Government Biodiversity Conservation Act 2016 . The main threats to the species are its small population size and restricted distribution, road and track maintenance and weed invasion. As of March 2021, it is listed as critically endangered under the EBPC Act.
