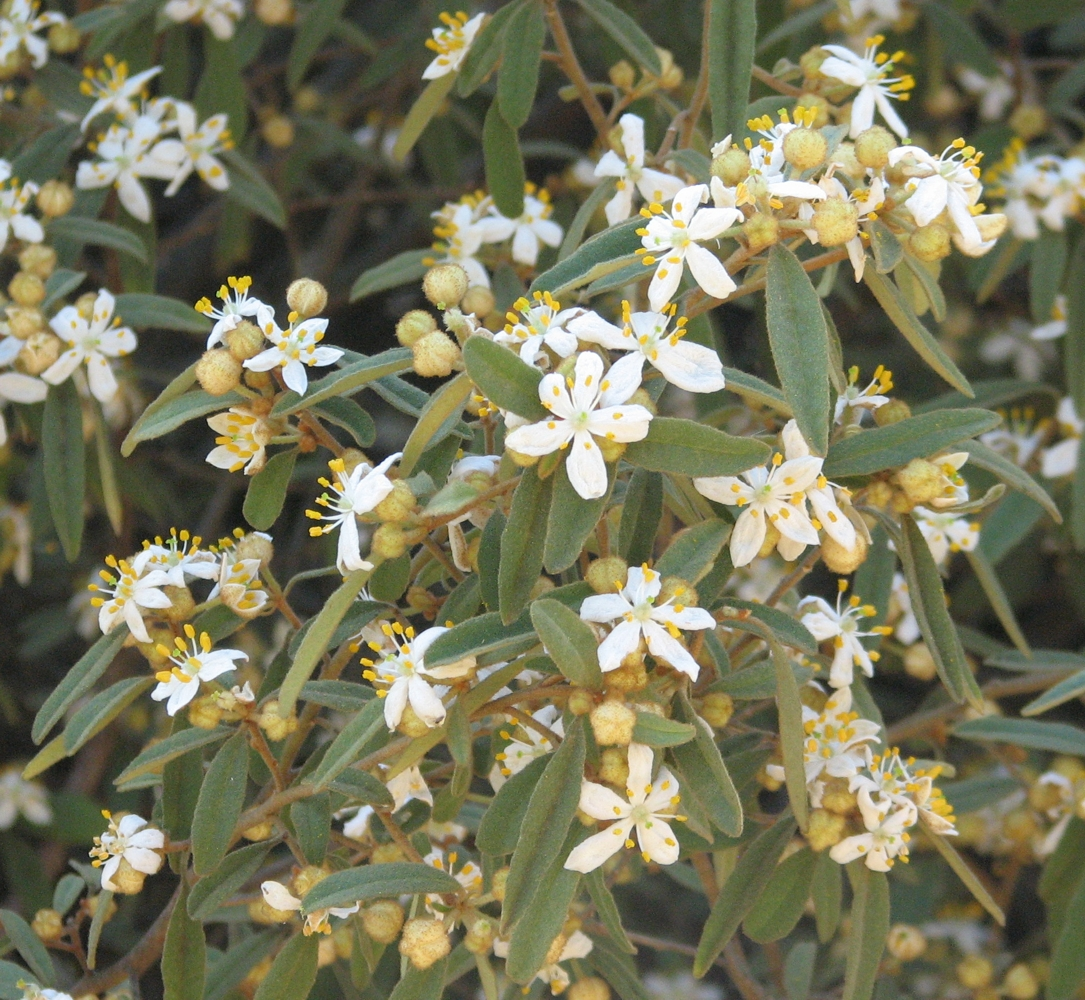
- Asterolasia hexapetala

Scientific classification
- Kingdom: Plantae
- Clade: Tracheophytes
- Clade: Angiosperms
- Clade: Eudicots
- Clade: Rosids
- Order: Sapindales
- Family: Rutaceae
- Subfamily: Zanthoxyloideae
- Genus: Asterolasia; F.Muell.

Synonyms
- Actinostigma Turcz.; Asterolasia sect. Pleurandropsis (Baill.) Kuntze; Asterolasia sect. Urocarpus (Drumm. ex Harv.) Benth.; Phebalium a. Correoides Endl.; Phebalium sect. Correoides (Endl.) Pfeiff.; Pleurandropsis Baill.; Urocarpus J.Drumm. ex Harv.

= Asterolasia =

Genus of flowering plants

Asterolasia is a genus of seventeen species of erect or prostrate shrubs in the family Rutaceae, and is endemic to Australia. The leaves are simple and arranged alternately, the flowers arranged in umbel-like groups on the ends of branchlets or in leaf axils, usually with five sepals, five petals and ten to twenty-five stamens. There are seventeen species and they are found in all Australian mainland states but not in the Northern Territory.

== Description ==
Plants in the genus Asterolasia are erect or prostrate shrubs. They have simple leaves arranged alternately along the stems, and are simple with smooth edges. The flowers are bisexual and have five sepals, five petals and ten to twenty-five stamens. The sepals, petals and stamens are all free from each other, the stamens slightly shorter than the petals. There are five carpels fused at the base, sometimes to the tip usually with a small beak with the styles fused to each other with a shield-shaped stigma. The fruit is composed of up to five follicle and the dull, black seeds are released explosively.

== Taxonomy ==
The genus Asterolasia was first formally described in 1854 by Ferdinand von Mueller in Transactions of the Philosophical Society of Victoria.

=== Species list ===
The following is a list of species and subspecies recognised by the Australian Plant Census as at June 2020:

- Asterolasia asteriscophora (F.Muell.) Druce - lemon starbush
  - Asterolasia asteriscophora subsp. albiflora B.J.Mole (Vic.)
  - Asterolasia asteriscophora (F.Muell.) Druce subsp. asteriscophora (S.A., N.S.W., Vic.)
- Asterolasia beckersii Orme & Duretto (N.S.W.) - Dungowan starbush
- Asterolasia buckinghamii (Blakely) Blakely (N.S.W.)
- Asterolasia buxifolia Benth. (N.S.W.)
- Asterolasia correifolia (Juss.) Benth. (Qld., N.S.W.)
- Asterolasia drummondii Paul G.Wilson — Gairdner Range starbush (W.A.)
- Asterolasia elegans L.McDougall & Porteners (N.S.W.)
- Asterolasia grandiflora (Hook.) Benth. (W.A.)
- Asterolasia hexapetala (Juss.) Druce (N.S.W.)
- Asterolasia muricata J.M.Black (S.A.) - lemon star-bush
- Asterolasia nivea (Paul G.Wilson) Paul G.Wilson — Bindoon starbush (W.A.)
- Asterolasia pallida Benth. (W.A.)
  - Asterolasia pallida subsp. hyalina Paul G.Wilson (W.A.)
  - Asterolasia pallida Benth. subsp. pallida (W.A.)
- Asterolasia phebalioides F.Muell. — downy starbush (S.A., Vic.) - downy starbush
- Asterolasia rivularis Paul G.Wilson (N.S.W.)
- Asterolasia rupestris B.J.Mole (N.S.W.)
  - Asterolasia rupestris subsp. recurva B.J.Mole (N.S.W.)
  - Asterolasia rupestris B.J.Mole subsp. rupestris (N.S.W.)
- Asterolasia squamuligera (Hook.) Benth. (W.A.) - yellow starbush
- Asterolasia trymalioides F.Muell. — alpine star-bush
  - Asterolasia trymalioides subsp. areniticola K.L.McDougall & C.J.Hook (N.S.W.)
  - Asterolasia trymalioides B.J.Mole subsp. trymalioides (N.S.W., Vic.)
  - Asterolasia trymalioides subsp. villosa B.J.Mole (N.S.W., A.C.T., Vic.)

== Distribution ==
Species of Asterolasia are found in all mainland states of Australia and in the Australian Capital Territory, but not in Tasmania or the Northern Territory.
