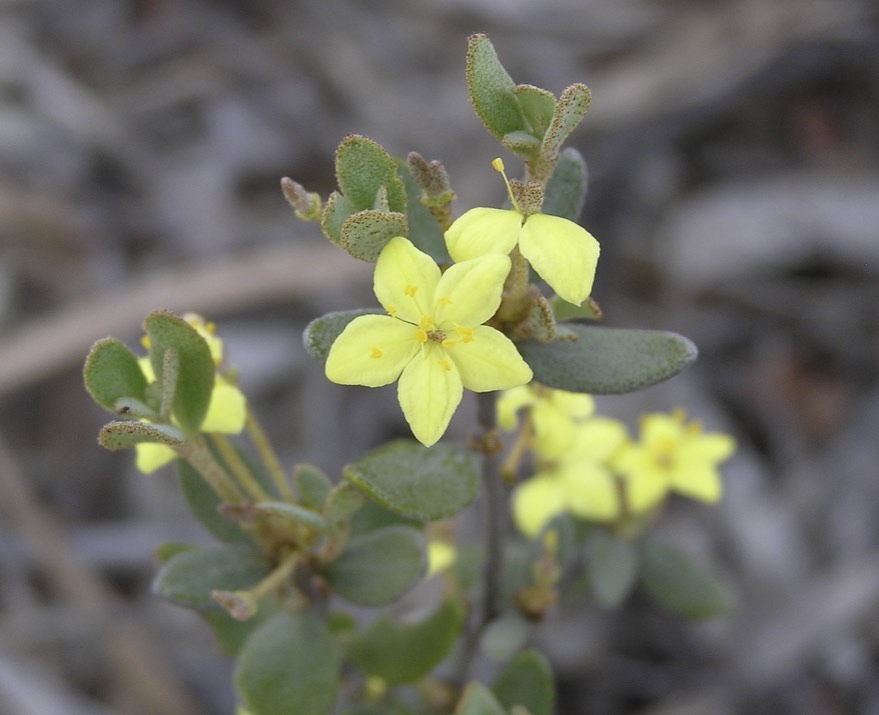

Scientific classification
- Kingdom: Plantae
- Clade: Tracheophytes
- Clade: Angiosperms
- Clade: Eudicots
- Clade: Rosids
- Order: Sapindales
- Family: Rutaceae
- Genus: Asterolasia
- Species: A. squamuligera

Binomial name
- Asterolasia squamuligera (Hook.) Benth.

Synonyms
- Eriostemon hookeri F.Muell. nom. illeg.; Phebalium squamuligerum Hook.; Urocarpus squamuliger (Hook.) Paul G.Wilson; Urocarpus squamuligerus Paul G.Wilson orth. var.

= Asterolasia squamuligera =

Yellow starbush

Species of flowering plant

Asterolasia squamuligera, commonly known as yellow starbush, is a species of erect, woody, slender perennial shrub that is endemic to the southwest of Western Australia. It has leathery, egg-shaped leaves with the narrower end towards the base and yellow flowers arranged in umbels of five to ten with a fringe of scales on the back of the petals, and about ten stamens.

== Description ==
Asterolasia squamuligera is slender, woody, perennial shrub that typically grows to a height of about 50 cm (20 in). The leaves are leathery, egg-shaped with the narrower end towards the base, 10–20 mm (0.39–0.79 in) long and glabrous or with a few star-shaped hairs. The flowers are arranged in sessile umbels of five to ten in leaf axils and on the ends of branchlets, each flower on a thin pedicel up to 15 mm (0.59 in) long. The petals are yellow, elliptical, about 6 mm (0.24 in) long, with a fringe of scales on the back, and there are about ten stamens.

== Taxonomy ==
This species was first formally described in 1848 by William Jackson Hooker who gave it the name Phebalium squamuligerum and published the description in Icones Plantarum from specimens collected by James Drummond.

In 1863, George Bentham changed the name to Asterolasia squamuligera, publishing the change in Flora Australiensis.

== Distribution and habitat ==
This species grows on laterite on hilltops and flats from near Augusta east to Lake Grace and from Beverley south to Mount Barker.

== Conservation status ==
Asterolasia squamuligera is classified as "not threatened" by the Government of Western Australia Department of Parks and Wildlife.
