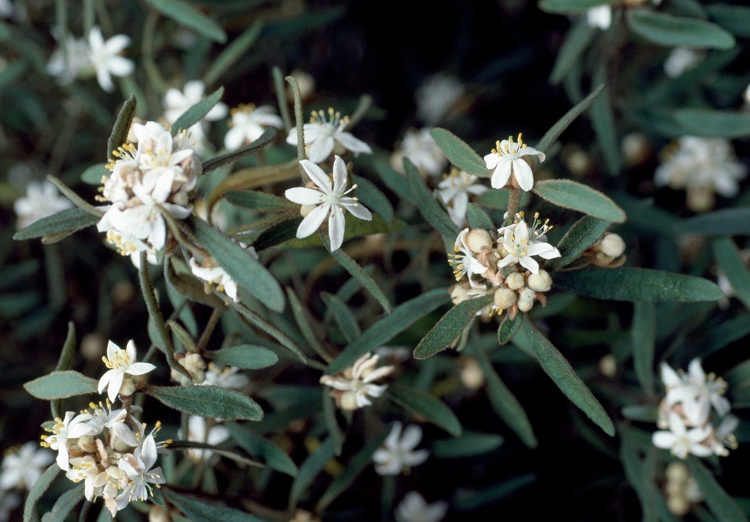
- In Mount Annan Botanic Garden

Conservation status
- Endangered (EPBC Act)

Scientific classification
- Kingdom: Plantae
- Clade: Tracheophytes
- Clade: Angiosperms
- Clade: Eudicots
- Clade: Rosids
- Order: Sapindales
- Family: Rutaceae
- Genus: Asterolasia
- Species: A. elegans

Binomial name
- Asterolasia elegans L.McDougall & Porteners

= Asterolasia elegans =

Species of flowering plant

Asterolasia elegans is a species of slender, erect shrub that is endemic to a restricted area of New South Wales. It has dense, woolly, rusty star-shaped hairs on its stems, lance-shaped leaves densely covered with white and rust-coloured hairs on the lower surface, and white flowers arranged singly or in groups of up to nine in leaf axils or on the ends of branchlets, the back of the petals densely covered with woolly, white hairs.

== Description ==
Asterolasia elegans is an erect, spindly shrub that typically grows to a height of 1–3 m (3 ft 3 in – 9 ft 10 in) with its stems densely covered with woolly, rusty-red, star-shaped hairs. The leaves are lance-shaped to elliptical, 40–130 mm (1.6–5.1 in) long and 9–25 mm (0.35–0.98 in) wide on a petiole 5–15 mm (0.20–0.59 in) long. The leaves are covered with white and rusty-red star-shaped hairs, densely so on the lower surface. The flowers are arranged singly or in umbels of up to nine in leaf axils or on the ends of branchlets, each flower on a pedicel 4–18 mm (0.16–0.71 in) long. The petals are white, elliptical, 8–14 mm (0.31–0.55 in) long, densely covered with white, star-shaped hairs on the back and there are ten stamens.

== Taxonomy ==
Asterolasia elegans was first formally described in 1990 by Lyn McDougall and Marianne F. Porteners in the journal Telopea from specimens collected by McDougall near Maroota in 1989.

== Distribution and habitat ==
This species grows in moist places on hillsides in forests north of Sydney.

== Conservation status ==
Asterolasia elegans is only known from seven populations over a distance of 37 km (23 mi) and is listed as "endangered" under the Australian Government Environment Protection and Biodiversity Conservation Act 1999 and the New South Wales Government Biodiversity Conservation Act 2016. The main threats to the species include inappropriate fire regimes, habitat loss, weed invasion and grazing by feral animals and domestic livestock.
