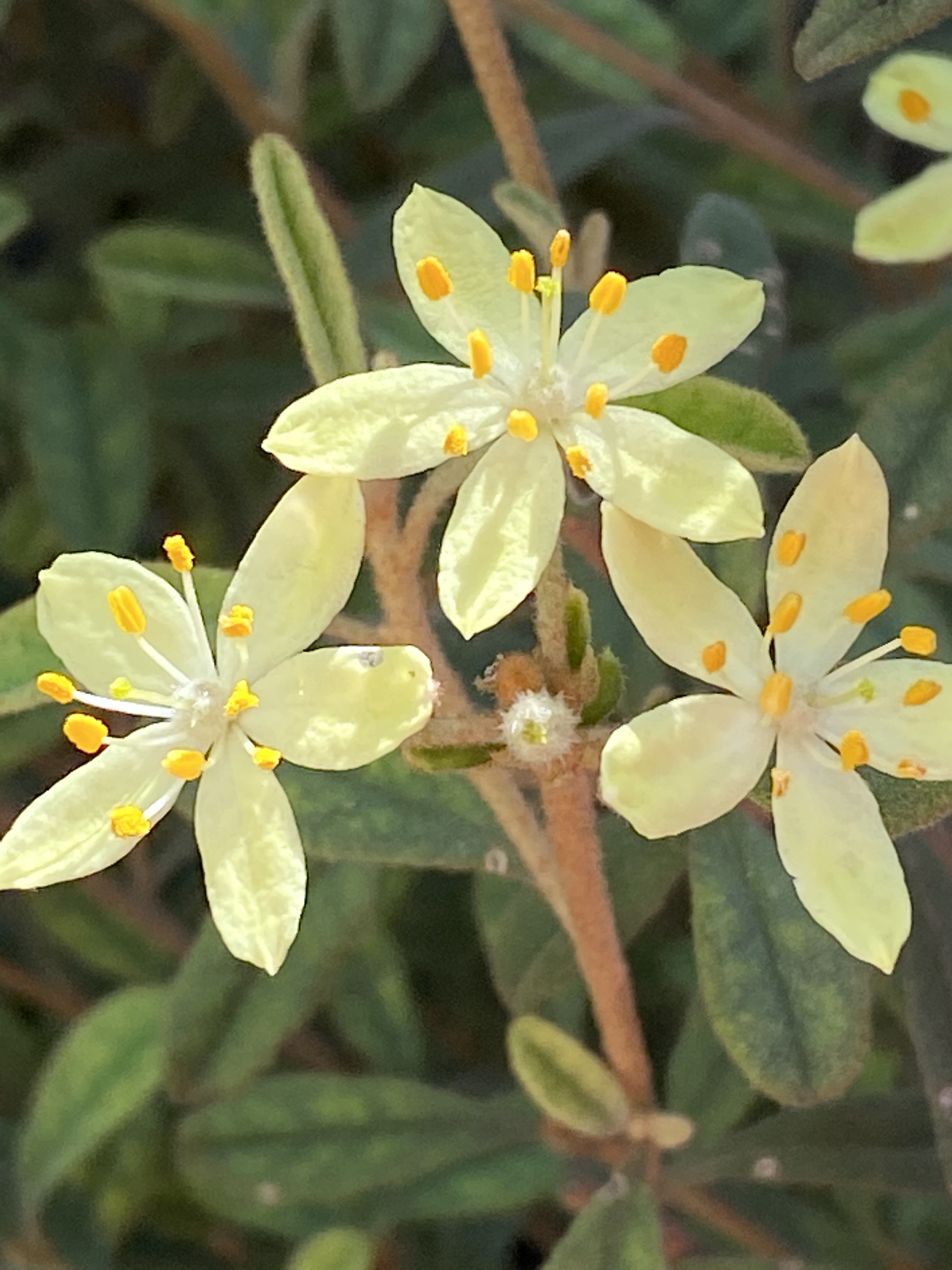
- Subspecies asteriscophora
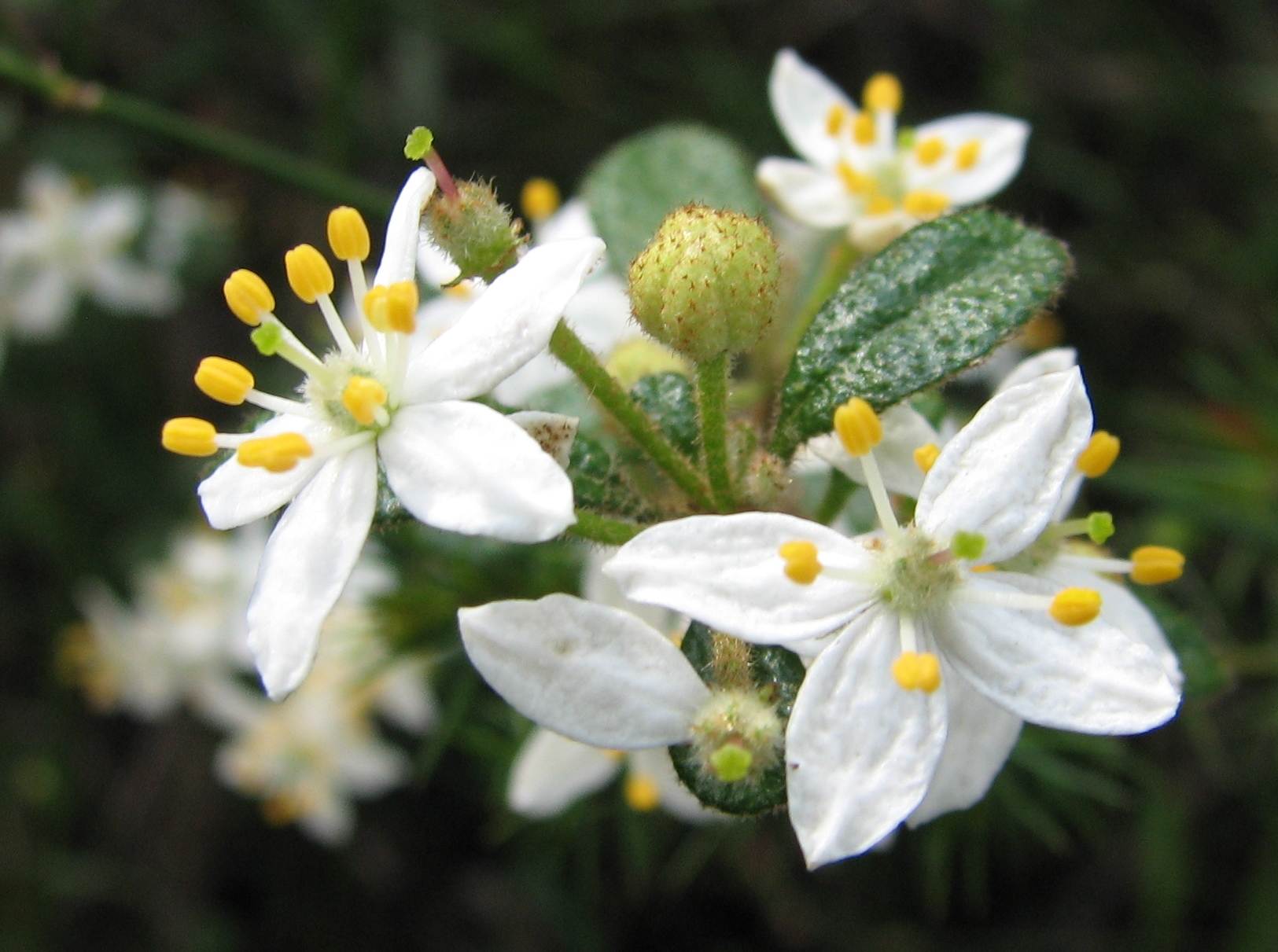
- Subspecies albiflora in Emerald

Scientific classification
- Kingdom: Plantae
- Clade: Tracheophytes
- Clade: Angiosperms
- Clade: Eudicots
- Clade: Rosids
- Order: Sapindales
- Family: Rutaceae
- Genus: Asterolasia
- Species: A. asteriscophora

Binomial name
- Asterolasia asteriscophora (F.Muell.) Druce

Synonyms
- Asterolasia correifolia var. muelleri Maiden & Betche; Asterolasia muelleri Benth. nom. illeg.; Phebalium asteriscophorum F.Muell.

= Asterolasia asteriscophora =

Lemon starbush

Species of flowering plant

Asterolasia asteriscophora, commonly known as lemon starbush, is a species of slender, erect shrub in the family Rutaceae and is endemic to southern continental Australia. It has woolly, star-shaped hairs on its young branches, variably-shaped leaves covered with brownish or whitish hairs on the underside, and yellow flowers with brown, star-shaped hairs on the back.

== Description ==
Asterolasia asteriscophora is a slender, erect shrub that typically grows to a height of 1–2 m (3 ft 3 in – 6 ft 7 in) with its young branches covered with woolly, grey to brown star-shaped hairs. The leaves are spatula-shaped, egg-shaped, wedge-shaped or elliptic, 3–30 mm (0.12–1.18 in) long and 2–10 mm (0.079–0.394 in) wide on a short petiole. The upper surface of the leaves is more or less glabrous and the lower surface is covered with woolly, brownish or whitish hairs. The flowers are arranged singly or in small groups in leaf axils or on the ends of branchlets on pedicels 2–20 mm (0.079–0.787 in) long. The petals are yellow, rarely white, 5–7 mm (0.20–0.28 in) long and covered with brown, woolly, star-shaped hairs on the back. Flowering occurs in spring.

== Taxonomy ==
This species was first described in 1855 by Ferdinand von Mueller who gave it the name Phebalium asteriscophora and published the description in Transactions and Proceedings of the Victorian Institute for the Advancement of Science. In 1917 George Claridge Druce changed the name to Asterolasia asteriscophora.

In 2002, Bryan J. Mole described two subspecies and the names have been accepted by the Australian Plant Census:

- Asterolasia asteriscophora subsp. albiflora that has white, rarely pale lemon-coloured petals with smaller leaves and flowers that the autonym;
- Asterolasia asteriscophora subsp. asteriscophora that has bright yellow petals up to 6 mm (0.24 in) long and leaves mostly longer than 12 mm (0.47 in).

== Distribution and habitat ==
Asterolasia asteriscophora is widely distributed along the Great Dividing Range from the Tumut district in New South Wales to the Macedon and Emerald districts in Victoria. It grows in forest and along the eges of watercourses. Subspecies albiflora is only known from the Emerald-Avonsleigh district, and is threatened by urban development.
