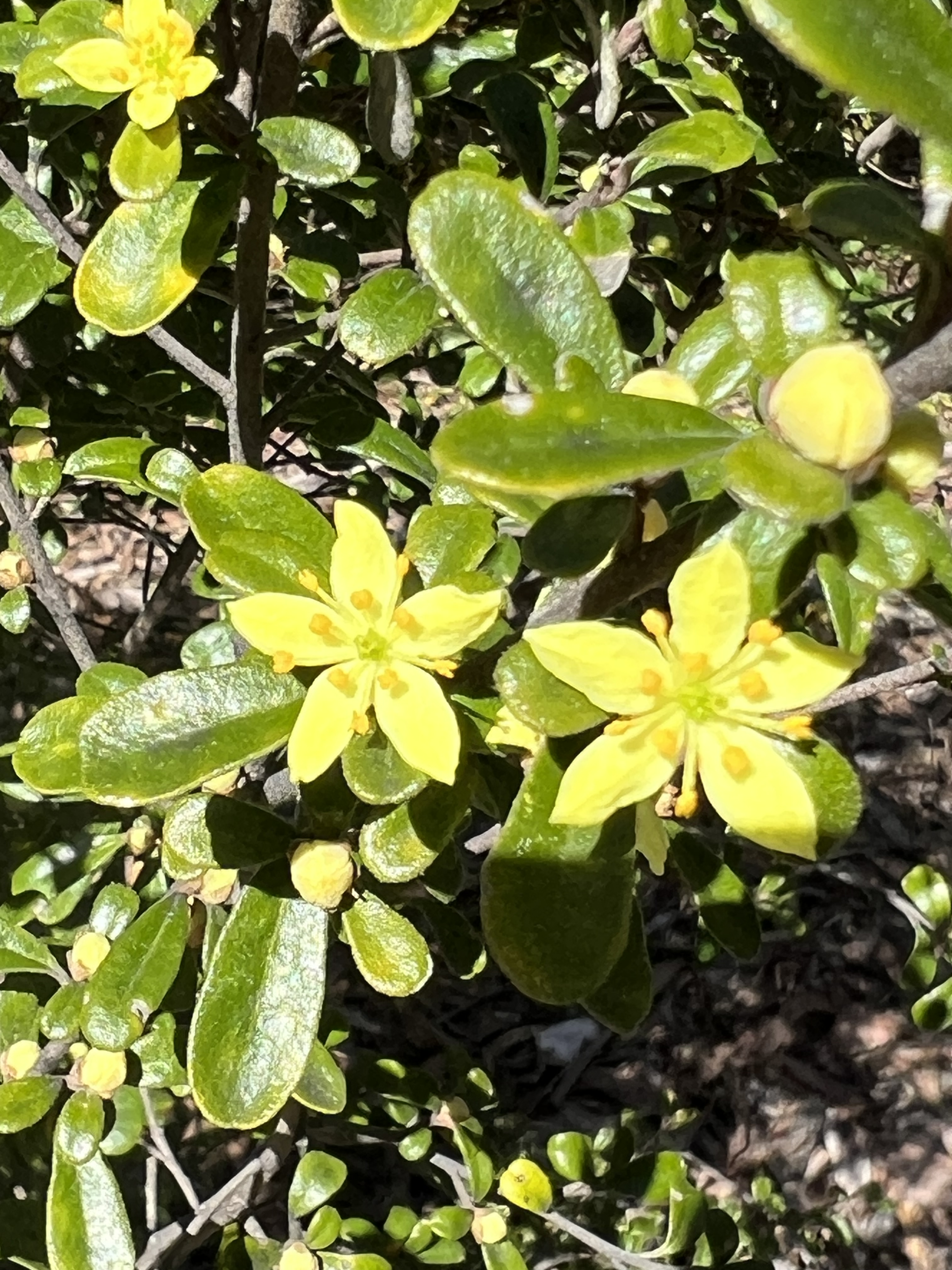

Conservation status
- Critically endangered (EPBC Act)

Scientific classification
- Kingdom: Plantae
- Clade: Tracheophytes
- Clade: Angiosperms
- Clade: Eudicots
- Clade: Rosids
- Order: Sapindales
- Family: Rutaceae
- Genus: Asterolasia
- Species: A. buxifolia

Binomial name
- Asterolasia buxifolia Benth.

Synonyms
- Eriostemon cunninghami F.Muell. orth. var.; Eriostemon cunninghamii F.Muell.; Phebalium buxifolium Benth. nom. inval., pro syn.

= Asterolasia buxifolia =

Species of flowering plant

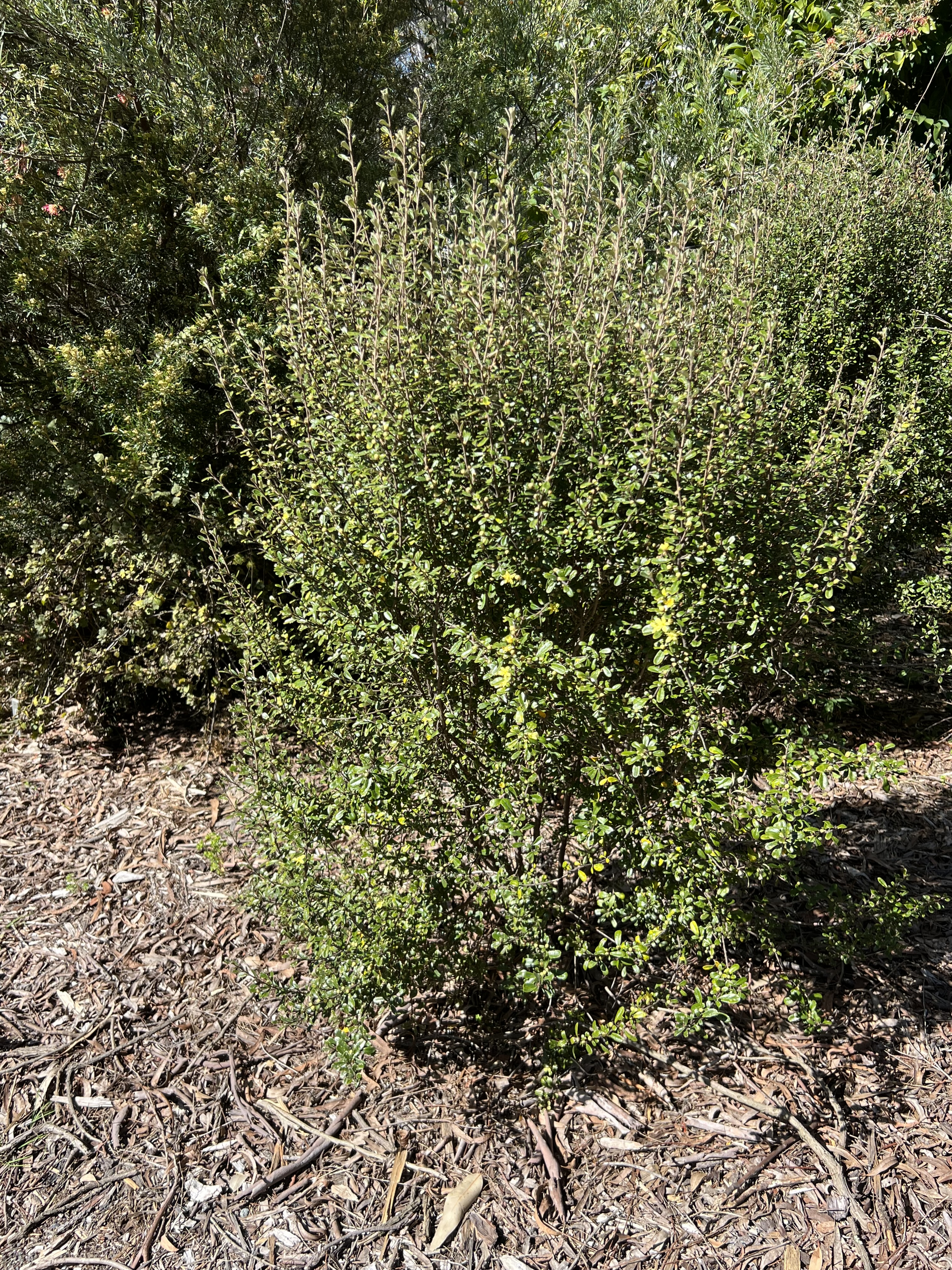
Habit

Asterolasia buxifolia is a species of spindly shrub in the family Rutaceae and is endemic to a restricted area of eastern New South Wales. It has star-shaped hairs on its stems, leathery leaves and yellow flowers arranged singly in leaf axils with star-shaped hairs on the back of the petals.

== Description ==
Asterolasia buxifolia is a spindly shrub that typically grows to a height of 1–2 m (3 ft 3 in – 6 ft 7 in) with its stems covered with star-shaped hairs. The leaves are leathery and egg-shaped with the narrower end towards the base, 5–18 mm (0.20–0.71 in) long and 3–10 mm (0.12–0.39 in) wide on a petiole 2–7 mm (0.079–0.276 in) long. The upper surface of the leaves is glabrous but the lower surface is covered with star-shaped hairs. The flowers are arranged singly in leaf axils, each flower on a pedicel up to 1–1.5 mm (0.039–0.059 in) long. The five petals are yellow, elliptical, 6–7 mm (0.24–0.28 in) long and covered with star-shaped hairs on the back.

== Taxonomy ==
This species was first described in 1863 by George Bentham who published the description in Flora Australiensis.

== Distribution and habitat ==
Asterolasia buxifolia is only known from a single site near the River Lett where it grows among granite rocks in forest in the Central Tablelands of eastern New South Wales.

== Conservation status ==
This plant was only rediscovered in 2000 and little is known about it. It is listed as "endangered" under the New South Wales Government Biodiversity Conservation Act 2016. The main threats to the species include weed invasion, habitat disturbance and grazing by rabbits, hares and livestock. As of September 2023, it is listed as critically endangered under the EBPC Act.
