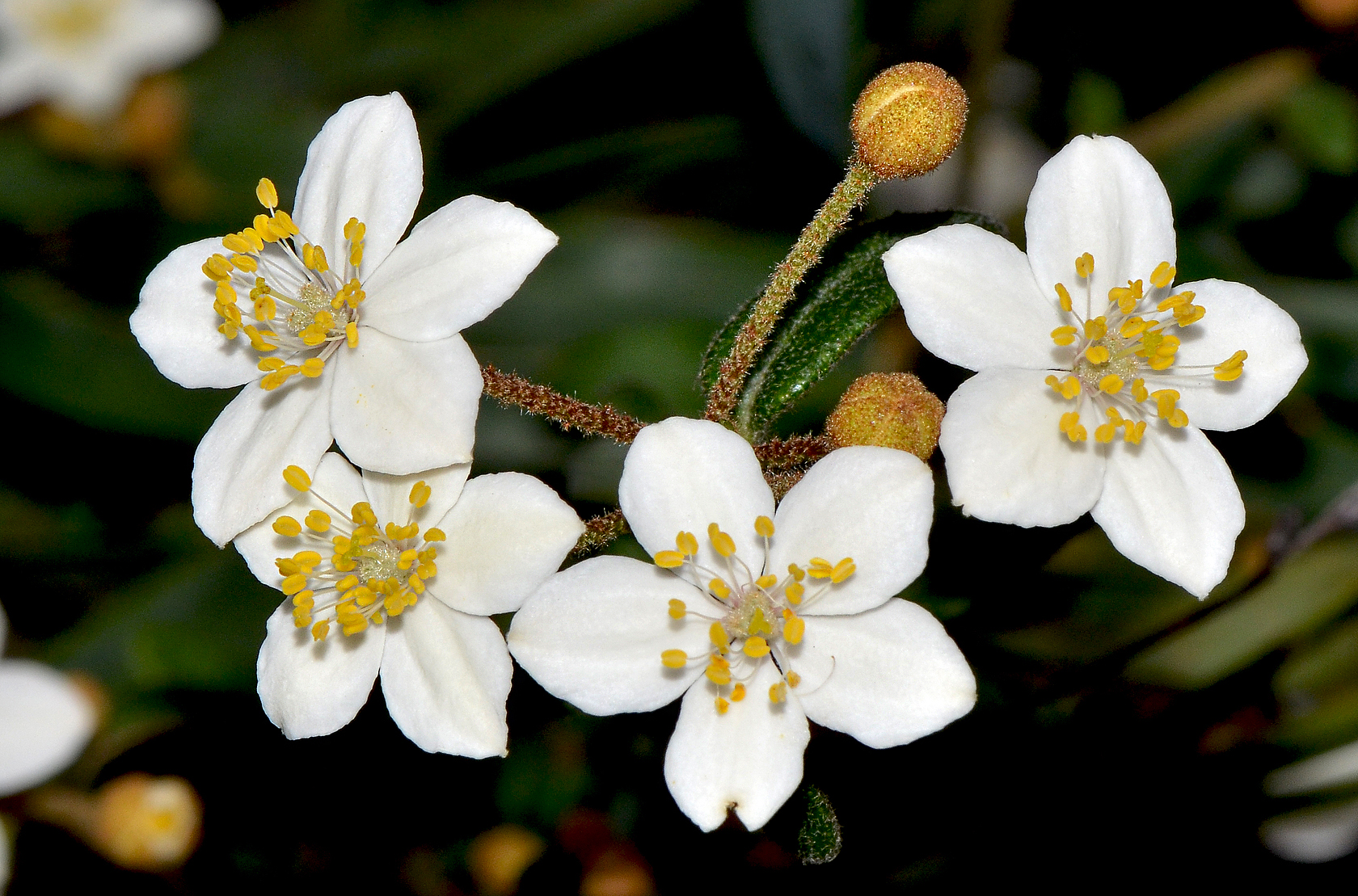

Scientific classification
- Kingdom: Plantae
- Clade: Tracheophytes
- Clade: Angiosperms
- Clade: Eudicots
- Clade: Rosids
- Order: Sapindales
- Family: Rutaceae
- Genus: Asterolasia
- Species: A. pallida

Binomial name
- Asterolasia pallida Benth.

Synonyms
- Asterolasia dielsii C.A.Gardner nom. inval., nom. nud.; Asterolasia dielsii C.A.Gardner; Eriostemon pallidus (Benth.) F.Muell.; Urocarpus pallidus (Benth.) Paul G.Wilson

= Asterolasia pallida =

Species of flowering plant

Asterolasia pallida is a species of woody, perennial herb that is endemic to the southwest of Western Australia. It has elliptical leaves and white flowers arranged in umbels of three to six with star-shaped hairs on the back of the petals and fifteen to twenty-five stamens.

== Description ==
Asterolasia pallida is a woody, perennial herb that typically grows to a height of about 1 m (3 ft 3 in) and sometimes forms a rhizome. The leaves are elliptical, 10–25 mm (0.39–0.98 in) long and covered with star-shaped hairs on the lower side. The flowers are arranged in umbels of three to six in leaf axils and on the ends of branchlets, each flower on a thin pedicel 3–10 mm (0.12–0.39 in) long. The petals are white, elliptical, 4–8 mm (0.16–0.31 in) long, with rust-coloured and colourless, star-shaped hairs on the back, and there are fifteen to twenty-five stamens.

== Taxonomy ==
Asterolasia pallida was first formally described in 1863 by George Bentham and the description was published in Flora Australiensis from specimens collected by James Drummond.

In 1998, Paul Wilson described two subspecies and the names are accepted by the Australian Plant Census:

- Asterolasia pallida subsp. hyalina has petals with only colourless hairs on the back of the petals and only occurs in the Dryandra State Forest south-east of Perth;
- Asterolasia pallida subsp. pallida has both colourless and reddish hairs on the back of the petals and has a widespread distribution on the Darling Range.

== Distribution and habitat ==
This species grows on laterite in jarrah - marri woodland on the Darling Range from near Perth to Manjimup. Subspecies hyalina is restricted to the Dryandra State Forest.

== Conservation status ==
Asterolasia pallida is classified as "not threatened" by the Government of Western Australia Department of Parks and Wildlife.
