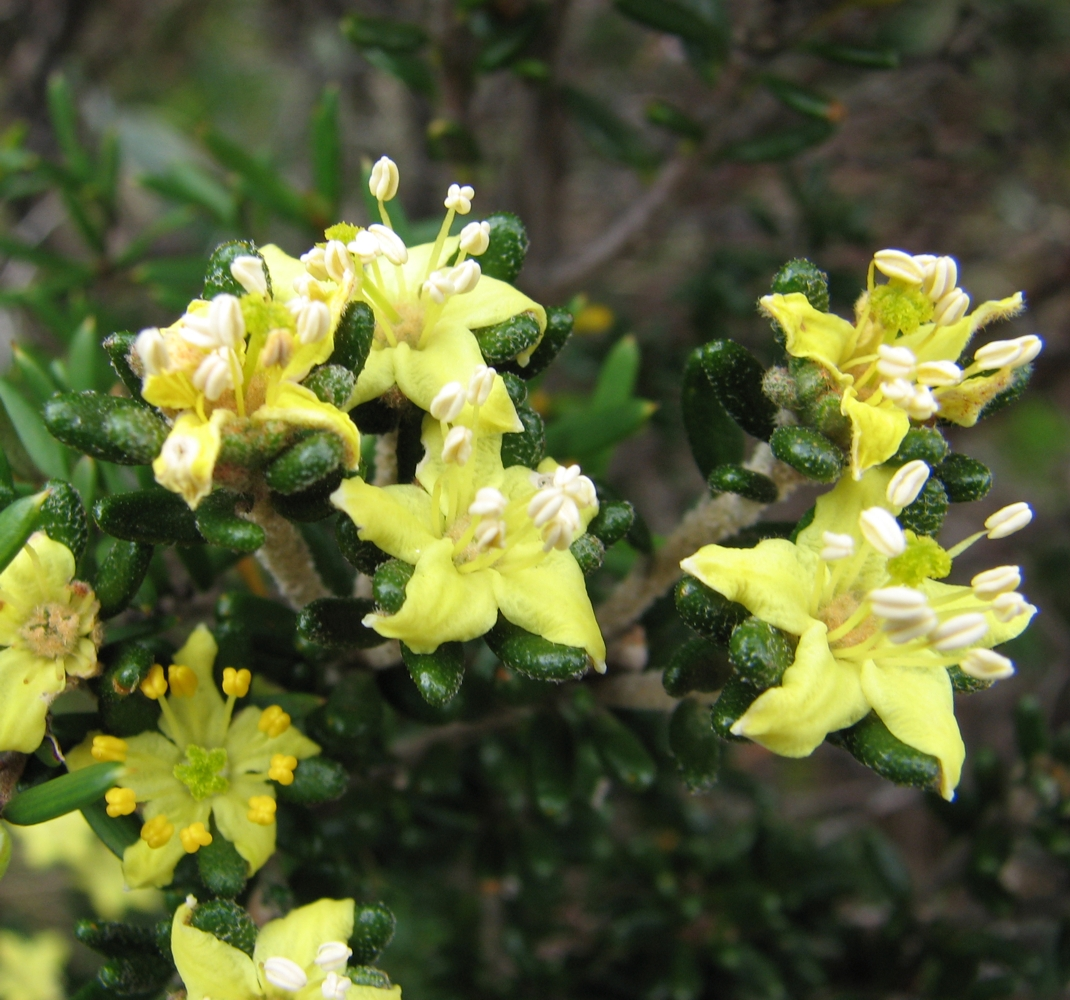
- In Baw Baw National Park, Victoria

Scientific classification
- Kingdom: Plantae
- Clade: Tracheophytes
- Clade: Angiosperms
- Clade: Eudicots
- Clade: Rosids
- Order: Sapindales
- Family: Rutaceae
- Genus: Asterolasia
- Species: A. trymalioides

Binomial name
- Asterolasia trymalioides F.Muell.

Synonyms
- Pleurandropsis trymalioides (F.Muell.) Anon.; Eriostemon trymalioides (F.Muell.) F.Muell.

= Asterolasia trymalioides =

Alpine star-bush

Species of flowering plant

Asterolasia trymalioides, commonly known as alpine star-bush, is a species of erect, sometimes prostrate shrub that is endemic to eastern Australia. It has leathery, narrow elliptical to circular leaves densely covered with star-shaped hairs on the lower surface, and yellow flowers arranged singly in small groups on the ends of branchlets, the back of the petals covered with brown, star-shaped hairs.

== Description ==
Asterolasia trymalioides is a prostrate to erect shrub that typically grows to a height of 0.2–1 m (7.9 in – 3 ft 3.4 in). It has narrow elliptical to circular leaves that are about 5 mm (0.20 in) long with the edges turned under. The leaves are glossy green on the upper surface and covered with white to brown hairs underneath. The flowers are arranged singly or in small groups on the ends of branchlets, each flower sessile with small leaf-like bracts at their base. The five petals are yellow, 5–6 mm (0.20–0.24 in) long, and densely covered with brown, woolly, star-shaped hairs on the back. Flowering occurs in early summer.

== Taxonomy ==
Asterolasia trymalioides was first formally described in 1854 by Ferdinand von Mueller who published the description in Transactions of the Philosophical Society of Victoria, based on plant material that he collected from the rocky summit of the Cobberas Range.

== Distribution and habitat ==
Alpine star-bush grows in alpine and subalpine grassland, heathland and snow gum (Eucalyptus pauciflora) forest of New South Wales, the Australian Capital Territory and Victoria.
