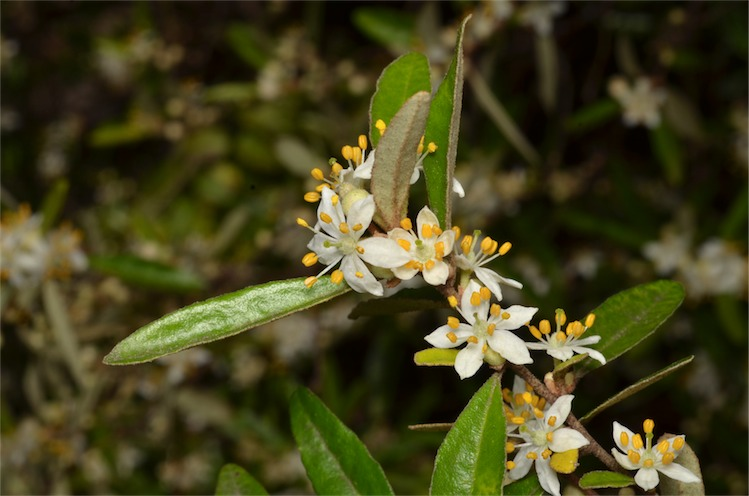
- In Australian National Botanic Gardens

Scientific classification
- Kingdom: Plantae
- Clade: Tracheophytes
- Clade: Angiosperms
- Clade: Eudicots
- Clade: Rosids
- Order: Sapindales
- Family: Rutaceae
- Genus: Asterolasia
- Species: A. correifolia

Binomial name
- Asterolasia correifolia (A.Juss.) Benth.

Synonyms
- Actinostigma lanceolatum Turcz.; Asterolasia correifolia (A.Juss.) Benth. var. correifolia; Eriostemon corraeifolius F.Muell. orth. var.; Eriostemon correifolius (A.Juss.) F.Muell.; Phebalium correaefolium A.Juss. orth. var.; Phebalium correifolium A.Juss.; Phebalium ovatum A.Juss. nom. inval., nom. nud.

= Asterolasia correifolia =

Species of flowering plant

Asterolasia correifolia is a species of erect shrub that is endemic to eastern Australia. It has white to brown star-shaped hairs on its stems, lance-shaped to elliptical leaves densely covered with white star-shaped hairs on the lower surface, and white to cream-coloured or yellow flowers arranged in umbels of four to ten or more in leaf axils, the back of the petals densely covered with white hairs.

== Description ==
Asterolasia correifolia is an erect shrub that typically grows to a height of 2–2.5 m (6 ft 7 in – 8 ft 2 in) with its stems covered with woolly, white to brown, star-shaped hairs. The leaves are lance-shaped to egg-shaped or elliptical, 20–120 mm (0.79–4.72 in) long and 11–45 mm (0.43–1.77 in) wide on a petiole 5–11 mm (0.20–0.43 in) long. The lower surface of the leaves are covered with white and pigmented, star-shaped hairs. The flowers are arranged in umbels of four to ten or more in leaf axils, each flower on a pedicel 7–20 mm (0.28–0.79 in) long. The petals are white to cream-coloured or yellow, mostly 5.5–7.5 mm (0.22–0.30 in) long, densely covered with coarse, star-shaped hairs on the back.

== Taxonomy ==
This species was first formally described in 1825 by Adrien-Henri de Jussieu who gave it the name Phebalium correaefolium and published the description in Mémoires de la Société d'Histoire Naturelle de Paris. In 1863, George Bentham changed the name to Asterolasia correifolia in Flora Australiensis.

In 2019, Philippa R. Alvarez and Marco Duretto published a paper suggesting that the plants previously known as A. correifolia occurring in Queensland and those on the Northern Tablelands of New South Wales were different species. They gave those in Queensland the name Asterolasia sola and those on the Northern Tablelands A. exasperata. The new names have not yet been accepted by the Australian Plant Census.

== Distribution and habitat ==
This species grows in wet forests in moist gullies and occurs in Carnarvon National Park in Queensland, and on the North and Central Coasts, Central and Southern Highlands of New South Wales.
