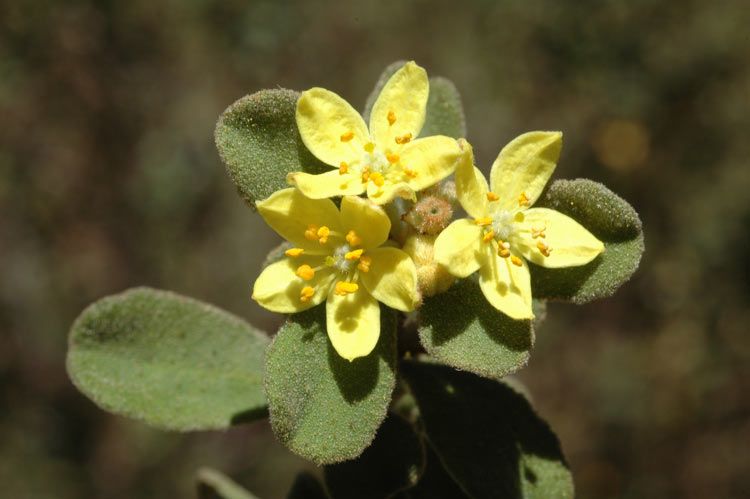
- In the ANBG

Scientific classification
- Kingdom: Plantae
- Clade: Tracheophytes
- Clade: Angiosperms
- Clade: Eudicots
- Clade: Rosids
- Order: Sapindales
- Family: Rutaceae
- Genus: Asterolasia
- Species: A. rupestris

Binomial name
- Asterolasia rupestris Bryan J. Mole
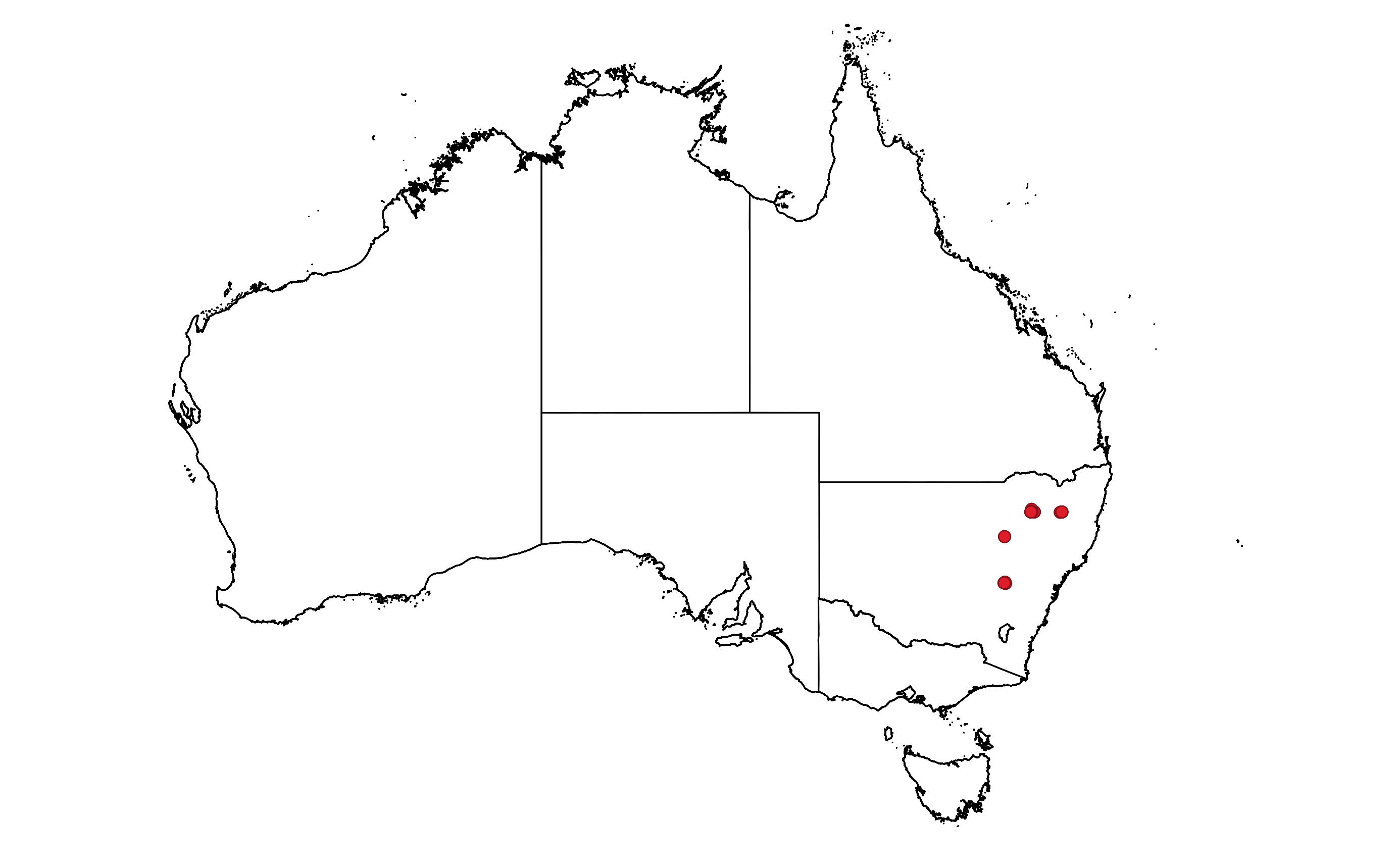
- Occurrence data from AVH

= Asterolasia rupestris =

Species of flowering plant

Asterolasia rupestris is a species of erect shrub that is endemic to New South Wales. It has heart-shaped to triangular leaves with the narrower end towards the base, and densely covered with star-shaped hairs. The flowers are yellow and arranged singly or in groups of three to six in leaf axils or on the ends of branchlets, the back of the petals densely covered with rust-coloured, star-shaped hairs.

== Description ==
Asterolasia rupestris is a shrub that typically grows to a height of 1.5 m (4 ft 11 in). The leaves are heart-shaped to triangular with the narrower end towards the base, 9–20 mm (0.35–0.79 in) long and 6–15 mm (0.24–0.59 in) wide on a short petiole. The leaves are densely covered with star-shaped hairs, the lower surface with cobwebby hairs. The flowers are arranged in umbels of three to six in leaf axils or on the ends of branchlets, the umbels on a peduncle 4–9 mm (0.16–0.35 in) long, each flower on a pedicel 6–15 mm (0.24–0.59 in) long. The sepals are 0.5–1 mm (0.020–0.039 in) long and the petals are yellow, elliptical, 5–9 mm (0.20–0.35 in) long, covered with rust-coloured, star-shaped hairs on the back. There are ten stamens. Flowering occurs in spring.

== Taxonomy ==
Asterolasia rupestris was first formally described in 2002 by Bryan J. Mole in the journal Muelleria from specimens collected on Mount Kaputar in 1987.

In the same journal, Mole described two subspecies:

- Asterolasia rupestris subsp. recurva that differs from the autonym in having the edges of the leaves turned downwards rather than flat;
- Asterolasia rupestris subsp. rupestris.

== Distribution and habitat ==
This species grows in heath, shrubland and woodland, usually on trachyte. Subspecies rupestris grows on the higher parts of Mount Kaputar and there are old records from Mount Canobolas. Subspecies recurva is only known from Parlour Mountain, north west of Armidale in New South Wales.

== Gallery ==
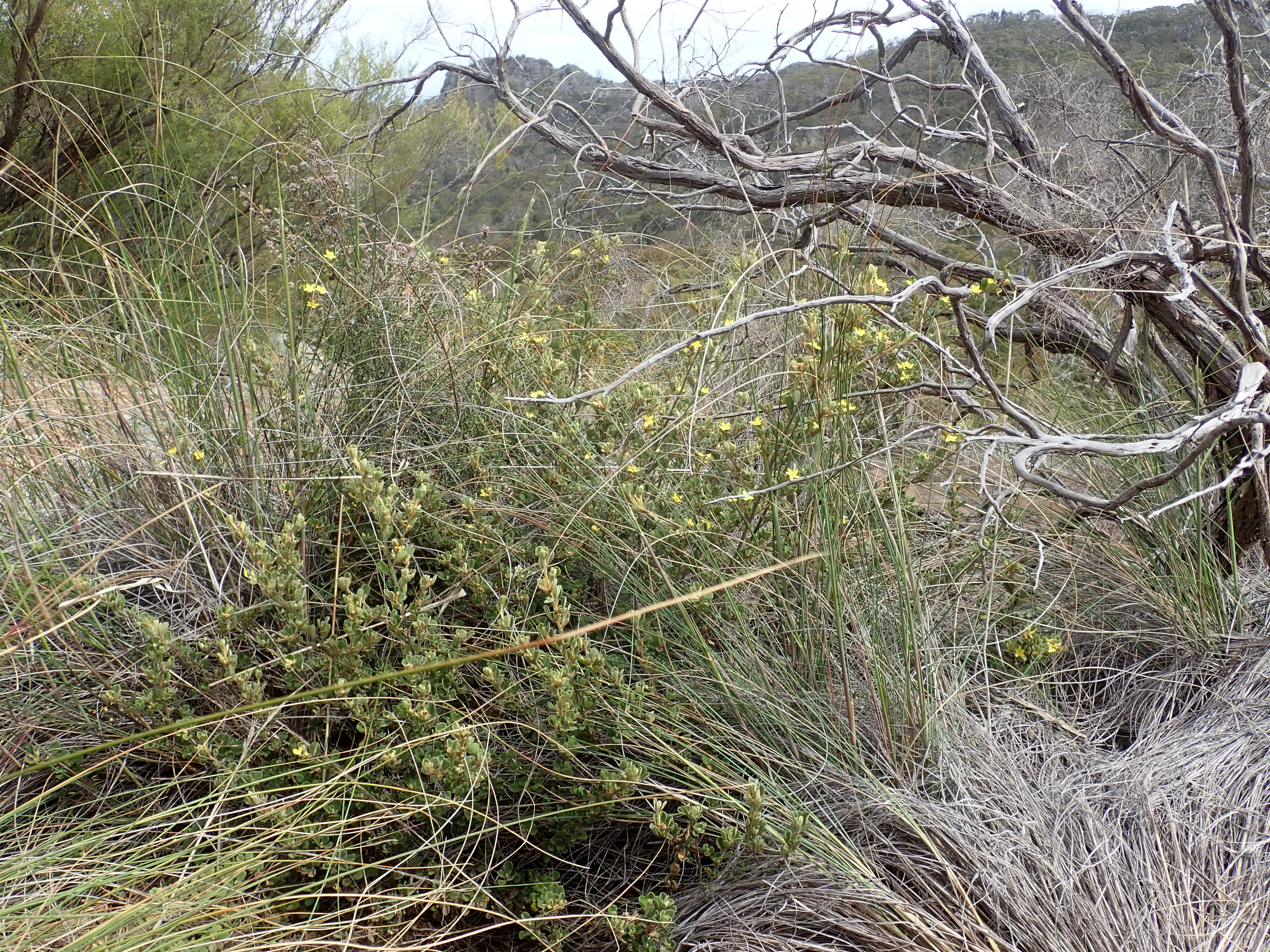
Habit

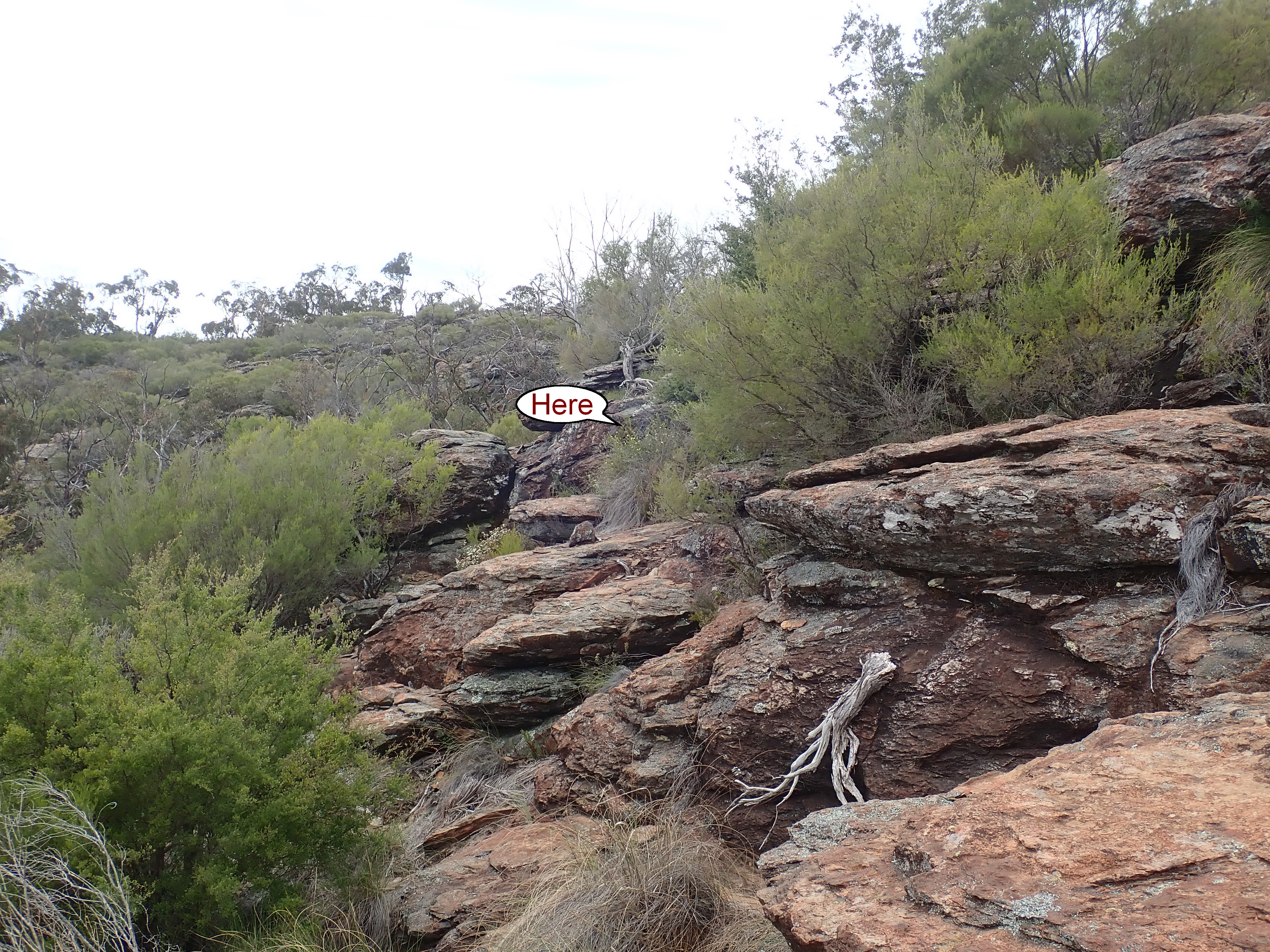
Habitat
