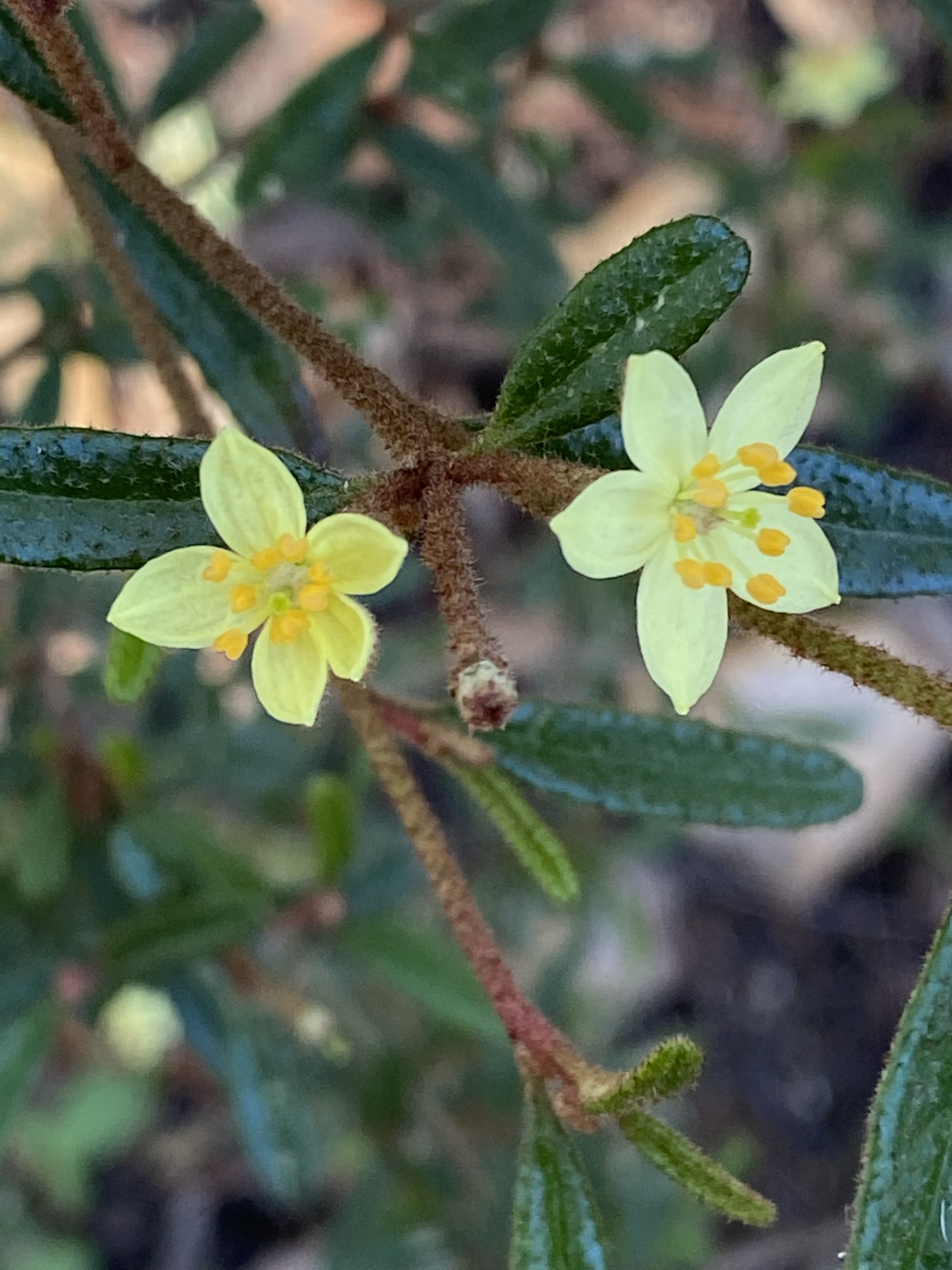
- Asterolasia rivularis in the ANBG

Scientific classification
- Kingdom: Plantae
- Clade: Tracheophytes
- Clade: Angiosperms
- Clade: Eudicots
- Clade: Rosids
- Order: Sapindales
- Family: Rutaceae
- Genus: Asterolasia
- Species: A. rivularis

Binomial name
- Asterolasia rivularis Paul G.Wilson

= Asterolasia rivularis =

Species of flowering plant

Asterolasia rivularis is a small, upright shrub, with narrow leaves and yellow flowers. It has a restricted distribution in New South Wales.

== Description ==
Asterolasia rivularis is a small shrub to 1.5 m (4 ft 11 in) high with young branches covered in brown to grey star-shaped, short matted hairs. The leaves may be narrowly oblong, narrow-oblong to wedge shaped and tapering at the base, 1–2.5 cm (0.39–0.98 in) long, 2–3 mm (0.079–0.118 in) wide. The leaf upper surface has occasional star-shaped hairs, underside brownish star-shaped to short matted hairs, margins slightly rolled under and narrowing to a short petiole. The flowers are either borne from leaf axils or at the end of branches in small clusters of 1-3, yellow petals about 6 mm (0.24 in) long, upper surface with rusty star-shaped to short matted hairs. The pedicels are up to 3 mm (0.12 in) long when in flower. Flowering occurs in early spring.

== Taxonomy ==
The species was first formally described by Paul G. Wilson in 1998 and the description was published in the journal Nuytsia.

== Distribution and habitat ==
Asterolasia rivularis has a restricted distribution, it is found growing along streams near Buxton.
