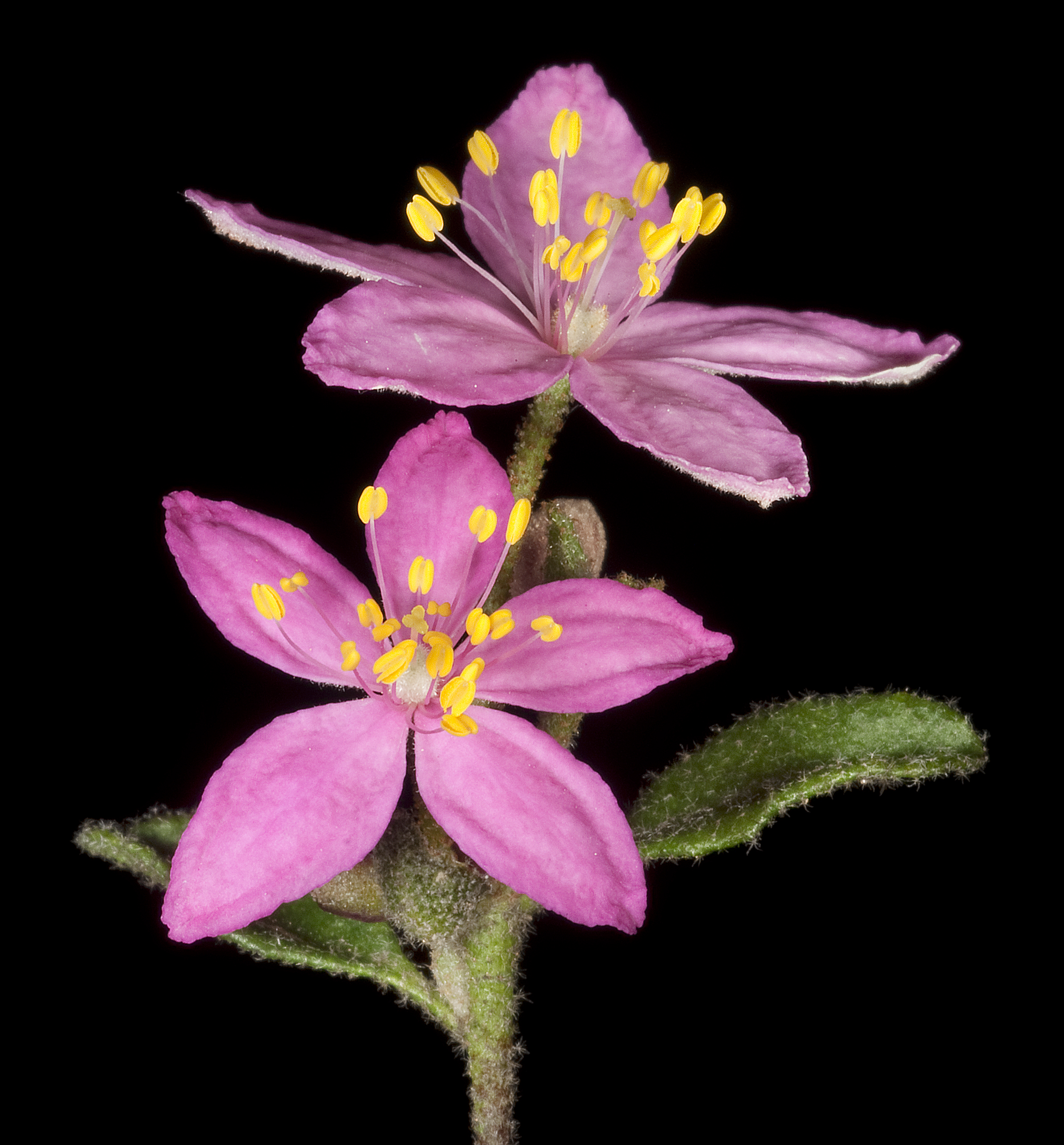

Conservation status
- Priority Four — Rare Taxa (DEC)

Scientific classification
- Kingdom: Plantae
- Clade: Tracheophytes
- Clade: Angiosperms
- Clade: Eudicots
- Clade: Rosids
- Order: Sapindales
- Family: Rutaceae
- Genus: Asterolasia
- Species: A. grandiflora

Binomial name
- Asterolasia grandiflora (Hook.) Benth.

Synonyms
- Eriostemon grandiflorus (Hook.) F.Muell.; Phebalium grandiflorum Hook.; Urocarpus grandiflorus (Hook.) Paul G.Wilson

= Asterolasia grandiflora =

Species of flowering plant

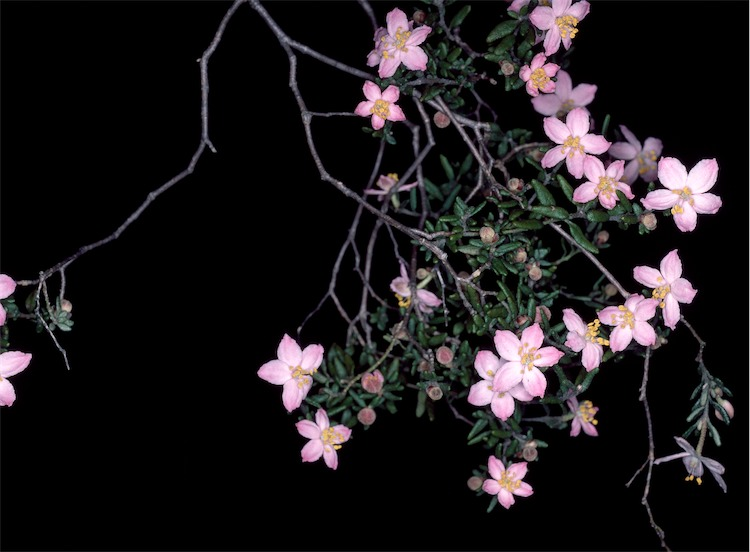
Habit

Asterolasia grandiflora is a species of weak, open shrub or sub-shrub that is endemic to the southwest of Western Australia. It has oblong, elliptical or egg-shaped leaves and pink to mauve flowers arranged in umbels of about three flowers with a thick covering of star-shaped hairs on the back of the petals.

== Description ==
Asterolasia grandiflora is a weak, open shrub or sub-shrub that typically grows to a height of 20–60 cm (7.9–23.6 in). The leaves are oblong, elliptical or egg-shaped, 4–20 mm (0.16–0.79 in) long and 1.5–6 mm (0.059–0.236 in) wide on a short petiole. The upper surface of the leaves has star-shaped hairs when young but the lower surface is densely covered with star-shaped hairs. The flowers are arranged in three or four in leaf axils and on the ends of branchlets, each flower on a pedicel 5–17 mm (0.20–0.67 in) long and covered with thick, star-shaped hairs. The petals are pink to mauve, broadly elliptical to egg-shaped, 6–15 mm (0.24–0.59 in) long and 3–9 mm (0.12–0.35 in) wide, with thick-centred, star-shaped hairs on the back that formed a shield over the flower bud. There are between twelve and twenty-four stamens.

== Taxonomy ==
This species was first formally described in 1863 by William Jackson Hooker who gave it the name Phebalium grandiflorum and published the description in Icones Plantarum. In 1863, George Bentham changed the name to Asterolasia grandiflora, publishing the change in Flora Australiensis.

== Distribution and habitat ==
Asterolasia grandiflora grows on breakaways and hills mostly between Toodyay and York in Western Australia.

== Conservation status ==
Asterolasia grandiflora is classified as "Priority Four" by the Government of Western Australia Department of Parks and Wildlife, meaning that is rare or near threatened.
