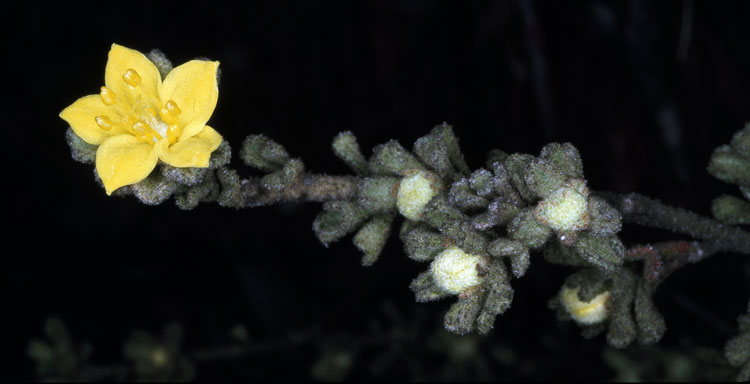
- Asterolasia phebalioides in the ANBG

Conservation status
- Vulnerable (EPBC Act)

Scientific classification
- Kingdom: Plantae
- Clade: Tracheophytes
- Clade: Angiosperms
- Clade: Eudicots
- Clade: Rosids
- Order: Sapindales
- Family: Rutaceae
- Genus: Asterolasia
- Species: A. phebalioides

Binomial name
- Asterolasia phebalioides F.Muell.

Synonyms
- Asterolasia pleurandroides Benth. nom. illeg., nom. superfl.; Eriostemon pleurandroides F.Muell. nom. illeg., nom. superfl.; Pleurandropsis phebalioides (F.Muell.) Baill.

= Asterolasia phebalioides =

Downy starbush

Species of flowering plant

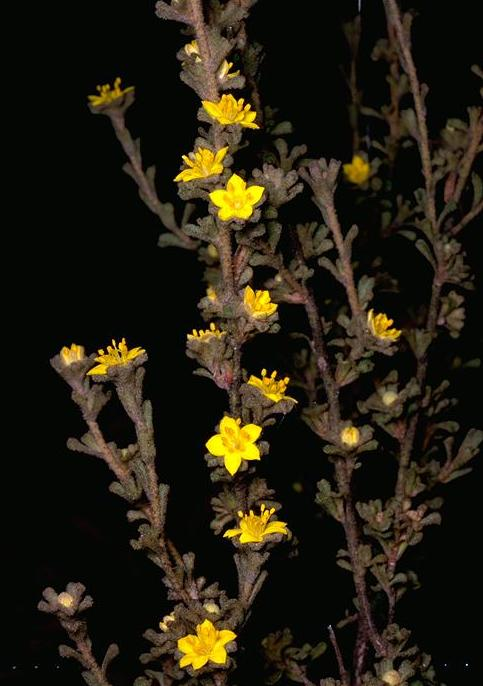
Habit

Asterolasia phebalioides, commonly known as downy starbush, is a species of shrub in the family Rutaceae and is endemic to south-eastern continental Australia. It has densely crowded heart-shaped to wedge-shaped leaves densely covered with star-shaped hairs, and single yellow flowers borne on the ends of branchlets with star-shaped hairs on the back of the petals.

== Description ==
Asterolasia phebalioides is a shrub that typically grows to a height of 50 cm (20 in) and is more or less covered with woolly, grey hairs and silvery to rust-coloured star-shaped hairs. The leaves are densely crowded on short branches, wedge-shaped to heart-shaped, 5–7 mm (0.20–0.28 in) long and densely covered with star-shaped hairs. The flowers are borne singly on the ends of branchlets with five scaly bracts at the base. The petals are yellow, broadly elliptical, 6–10 mm (0.24–0.39 in) long and covered with star-shaped hairs on the back. Flowering occurs from September to December.

== Taxonomy ==
Asterolasia phebalioides was first formally described in 1854 by Ferdinand von Mueller and the description was published in Transactions of the Philosophical Society of Victoria.

== Distribution and habitat ==
Downy starbush grows in woodland, forest and heath and occurs in the Grampians and Little Desert regions of Victoria and on Kangaroo Island in South Australia.

== Conservation status ==
Asterolasia phebalioides is listed as "vulnerable" under the Australian Government Environment Protection and Biodiversity Conservation Act 1999 and a recovery plan has been prepared. The main threats to the species include vegetation clearance, weed invasion and disease caused by the fungus Phytophthora cinnamomi.
